= Painting in ancient Rome =

Decorative style in ancient Rome

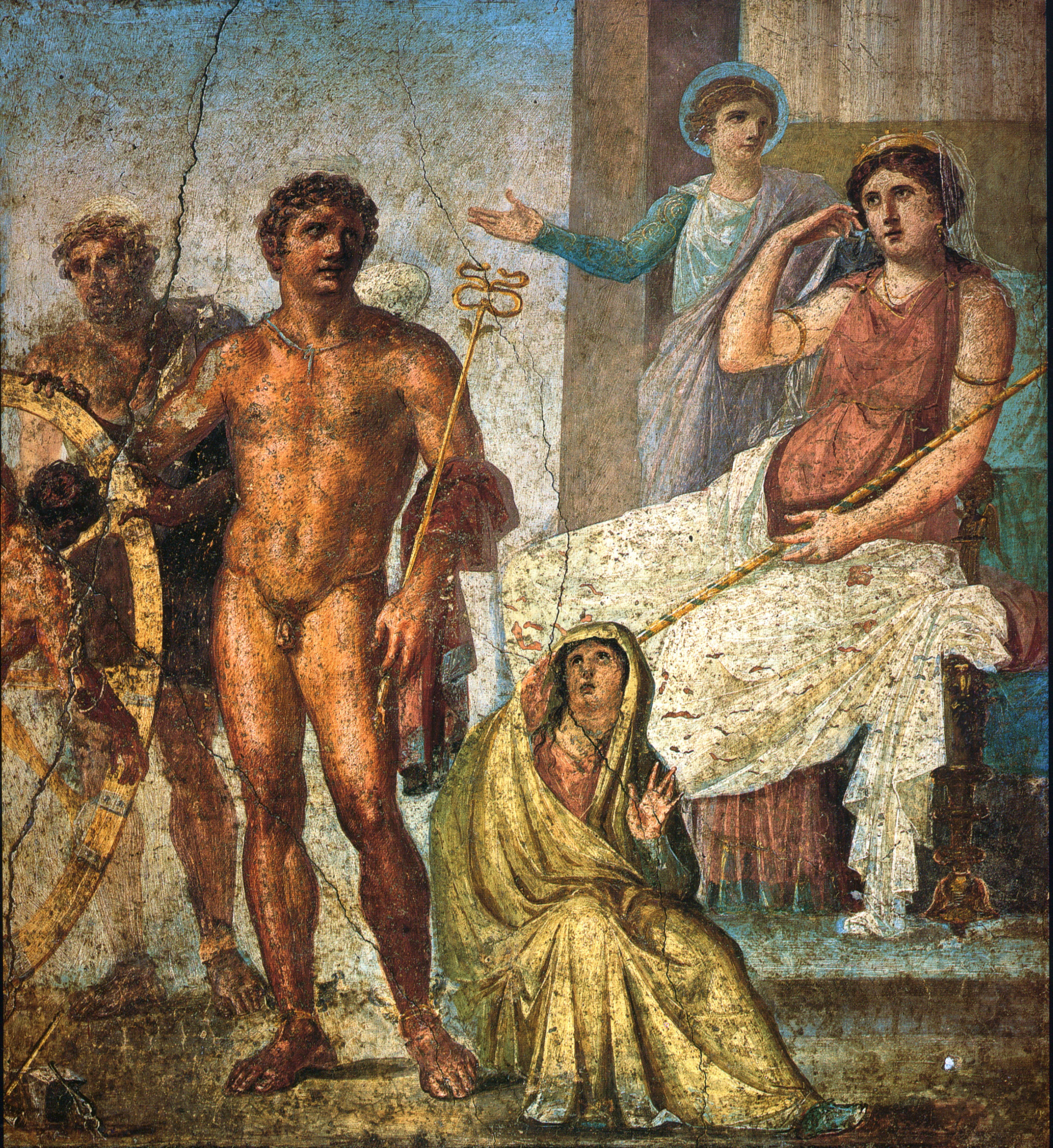
Punishment of Ixion, House of the Vettii, Pompeii

Painting in ancient Rome is a rather poorly understood aspect of Roman art, as there are few survivals, which are mostly wall-paintings from Pompeii, Herculaneum and other sites buried by the eruption of Mount Vesuvius in AD 79, where many decorative wall paintings were preserved under the ashes and hardened lava. A smaller number of paintings survive from other areas, including Rome itself.

From the study of surviving paintings it has been possible to form a panorama of the artistic life of Ancient Rome between the end of the Republic and the beginning of the Empire. Nevertheless, this body of works is only a tiny fraction of the great quantity of painting produced in the Roman Empire during its long history, and there is a lack of significant remains from earlier and later periods, particularly in techniques other than fresco and from Romanized regions besides Campania.

Rome was always an avid consumer and producer of art. Originally under Etruscan rule, the Romans developed an art that was largely indebted to them, which was itself heavily influenced by archaic Greek art. As Roman power grew it came into contact with Hellenistic Greek culture, and began to assimilate its principles into all artistic fields, including painting. Greek paintings were highly coveted luxuries and enormous quantities were imported during the conquest of Greek cultural areas, and it became customary to copy famous works and to vary on Greek techniques and subjects.

Much of what is known about Greek painting is owed to Rome, since hardly any original Greek paintings survive from any era, except for vase painting. Were it not for the preservation of Pompeii and Herculaneum in fairly good condition, whose murals are numerous and of great quality, the contemporary idea of the painting of both Ancient Greece and Rome would be based almost solely on literary descriptions.

Roman painting had a significant influence on the evolution of Western painting. Its traditions continued into Paleochristian Byzantine, and Romanesque art. Much later on, renewed interest in emulating Classical painting provided an impetus for the art of the Renaissance, Neoclassicism, and Romanticism. Roman painting has been an active area of scholarly research for centuries, as archeological excavations have continued to uncover new artworks.

== Origins: Etruria and Greece ==
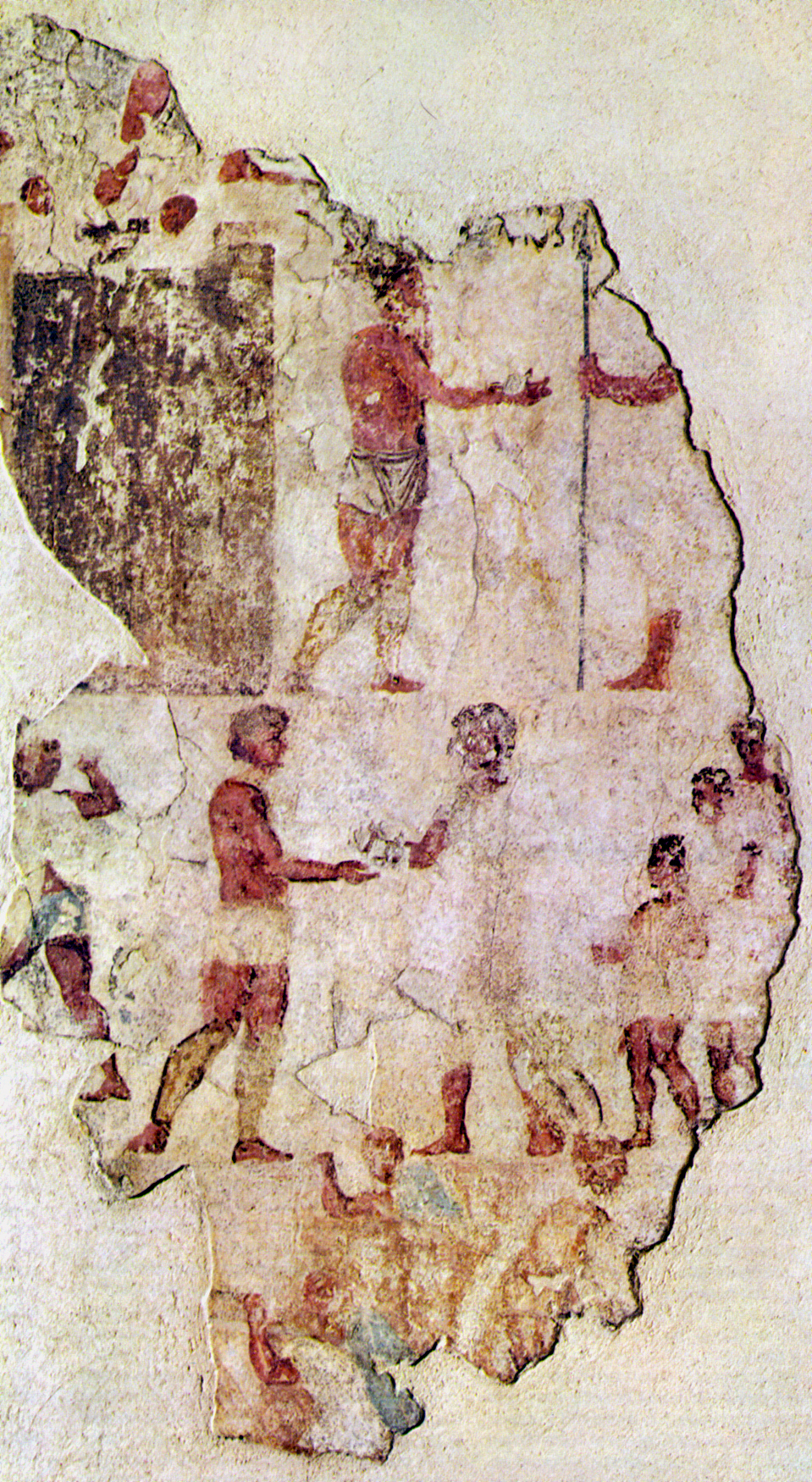
Roman fresco from the Tomb of Esquilino, c. 300-280 B.C.

As with the other arts, the art of painting in Ancient Rome was indebted to its Greek antecedents. In archaic times, when Rome was still under Etruscan influence, they shared a linear style learned from the Ionian Greeks of the Archaic period, showing scenes from Greek mythology, daily life, funeral games, banquet scenes with musicians and dancers, animals, and floral and abstract decoration. Remaining examples of Etruscan painting come from funerary contexts, found in tombs in Capaccio Paestum, Orvieto, Tarquinia, Cerveteri and other cities. Etruscan styles of tomb painting was probably similar to the decoration of temples and public buildings.

From the 5th century BC on, the Athenian classical style began to predominate in Greece. During this period painting accrued the technical resources and thematic spectrum that would later influence the Romans. Through a span of about a hundred years, generations of artists such as Polygnotos, Apollodorus, Zeuxis, and Parrhasius gradually developed techniques for representing perspective, volume, shading, and scenery, as evidenced by thousands of surviving vase paintings.

By the last quarter of the 4th century BC, the era of Apelles, the most famous of Greek painters, artists were able to create an impression of three-dimensionality and naturalism in their scenes. Often painting on portable wooden panels, these works spread throughout the area of Greek influence and became known in Rome. The most frequent themes were taken from mythology, followed by portraits and allegories. Less common, though not rare, were landscape paintings, erotic scenes, and still lifes.

Between the 4th and 3rd centuries BC classical Greek and Hellenistic art exerted a massive influence on Roman art, through their contact with the Greek colonies in Magna Graecia. This contact was especially through military campaigns; Greek works of art became coveted war booty. Greek artists also began to move to Rome there in search of generous patronage, and adapted to the demands of local taste. Among the genres that would become preferred for domestic and tomb decoration was that of landscapes, architecture, and abstract or floral arrangements. Classical Italian tombs are found in Chiusi, an important commercial center of this phase, and their tomb paintings show advances in the technique of shading and three-dimensional effects. However, almost all painting done in the Republic is lost today, except for a few examples, such as fragment of a fresco found in a tomb on Esquiline Hill.

By the 1st century BC, large private collections were formed by patricians who spent fortunes acquiring new pieces. Pliny the Elder says that Agrippa paid 1.2 million sestertius for two paintings showing Ajax the Great and Venus.

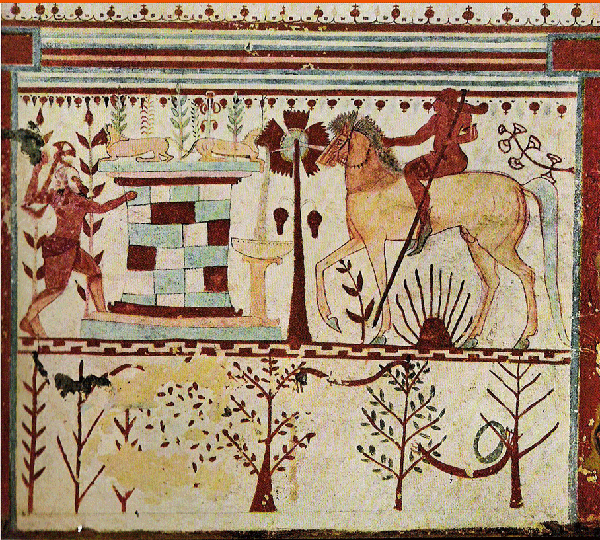
Troilus and Achilles, Etruscan. Tomb of the Bulls, Tarquinia, 6th century B.C.

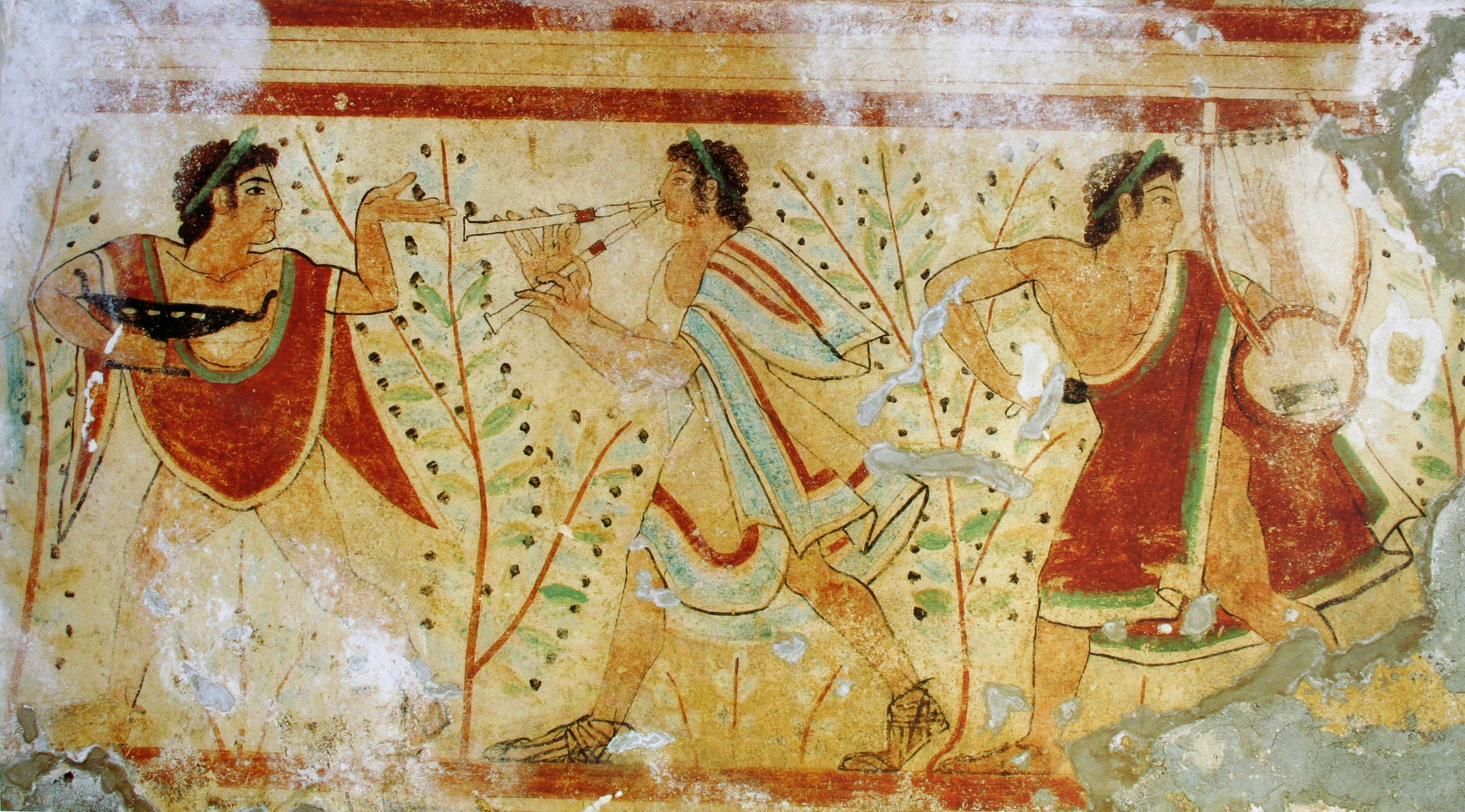
Musicians, Etruscan. Tomb of the Leopards, Paestum, 5th century B.C.

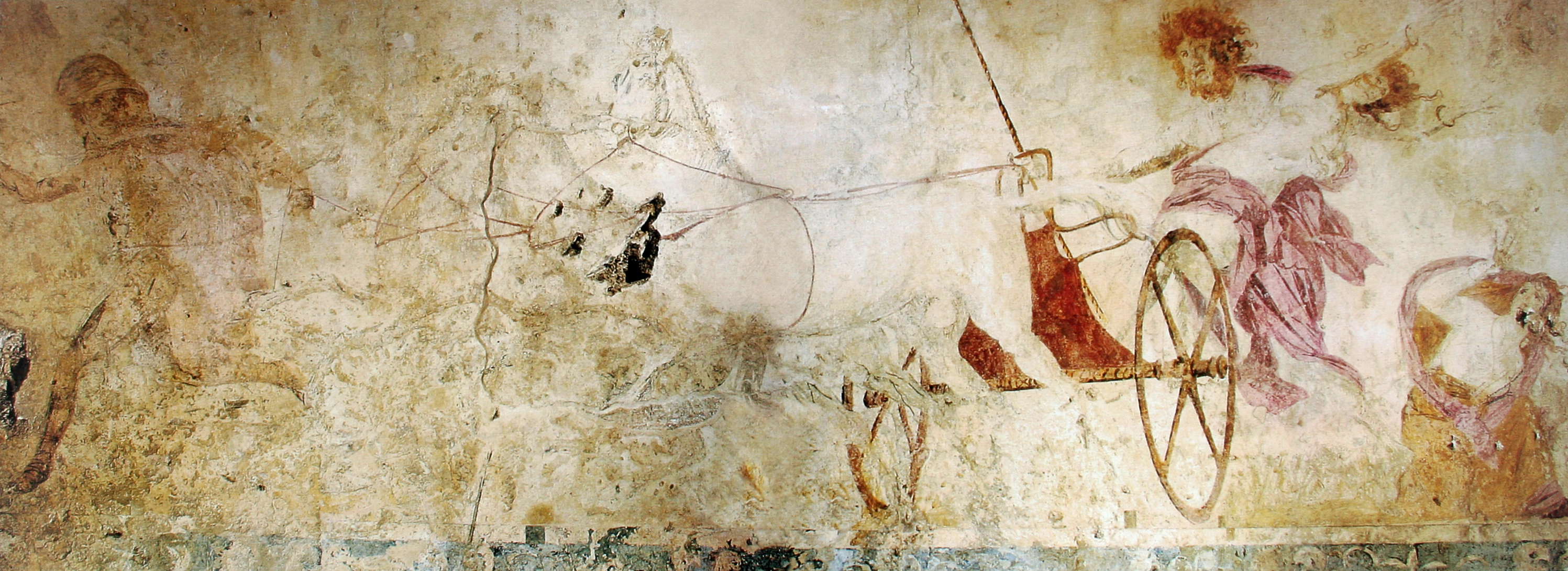
The abduction of Persephone, Greek. Royal Tomb, Vergina, 4th century BC.

== Evolution and styles ==
Still life with fruit, House of the Stags, Herculaneum

In the transition from the Republic to the Empire, Roman painting consolidated and developed its own style distinct from the Hellenistic canon. The ensemble of paintings of Pompeii, Herculaneum, and Boscoreale, ranging from the 2nd century BC to AD 79, has provided scholars a basis for establishing a division of Roman painting into four periods or styles. This division was defined by the German archaeologist August Mau in the 19th century, and is still used today, although it has been subject to dispute among art historians, because their characteristics are shared to some extent, making the identification of examples confusing and subject to individual interpretations, especially the Third and Fourth styles. The problem is further complicated by the use of archaisms and the overlapping of trends in late phases.

Although the vast majority of remaining Roman paintings come from Campania and Lazio, surviving fragments from throughout the Empire show that the fashions of the centre were sooner or later assimilated by the regional centers in most of the empire. Nevertheless, It is known that the metropolitan style encountered a lot of resistance in some points in the East and in North Africa.

Among the painters, few names have reached our days. Ancient bibliography cites the Greeks Gorgasus and Damophilus as the first known artists to make paintings in Italy. Gaius Fabius Pictor, a little later, was celebrated as a historical painter and the first Roman painter recorded in history, being seconded by Marcus Pacuvius, Serapion and Methododorus, at a stage when the elite could still devote themselves professionally to the arts without dishonor. From the 2nd century B.C. onward, Sopolis, Dionysius, Glatius and his son Aristippus, Timmachus of Byzantium, and Antiochus Gabinus stood out. In the Empire were Studius, Echion, Lucius and Famulus. No surviving works can be safely attributed to any of them, except for Famulus, who was given as the author of the decoration of Nero's Domus Aurea. However, modern research has uncovered some anonymous artists from certain groups of works that seem to have come from the same hand, such as the "Painter of Thelephus", the "Painter of Admetus", the "Painter of the wounded Adonis" and so on.

New discoveries of Roman paintings have emerged from recent archaeological research, with several examples discovered in areas far from the capital, such as in Germany, Hungary, France, Portugal, and Asia.

=== First Style ===
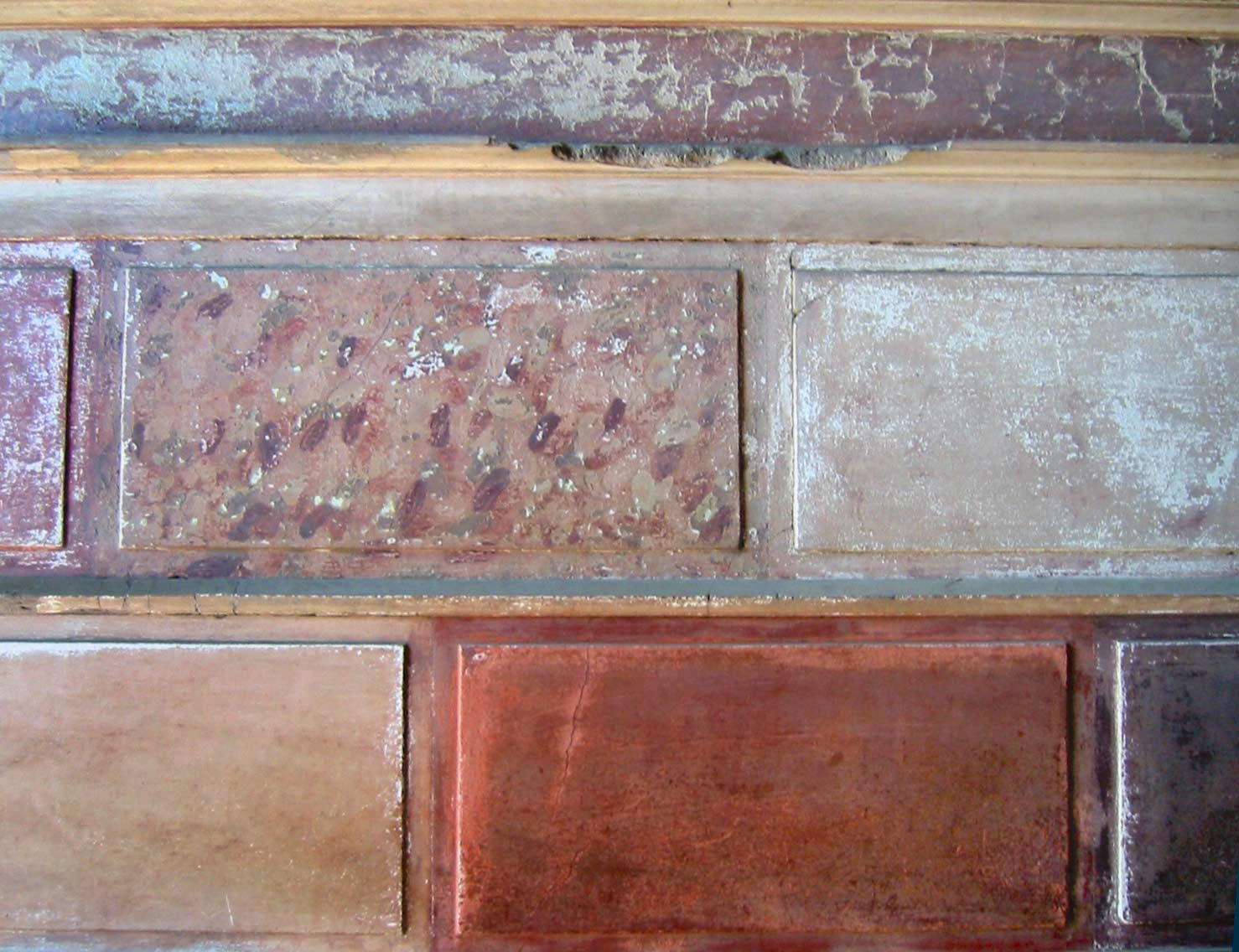
Detail of mural in primitive First Style. Pompeii

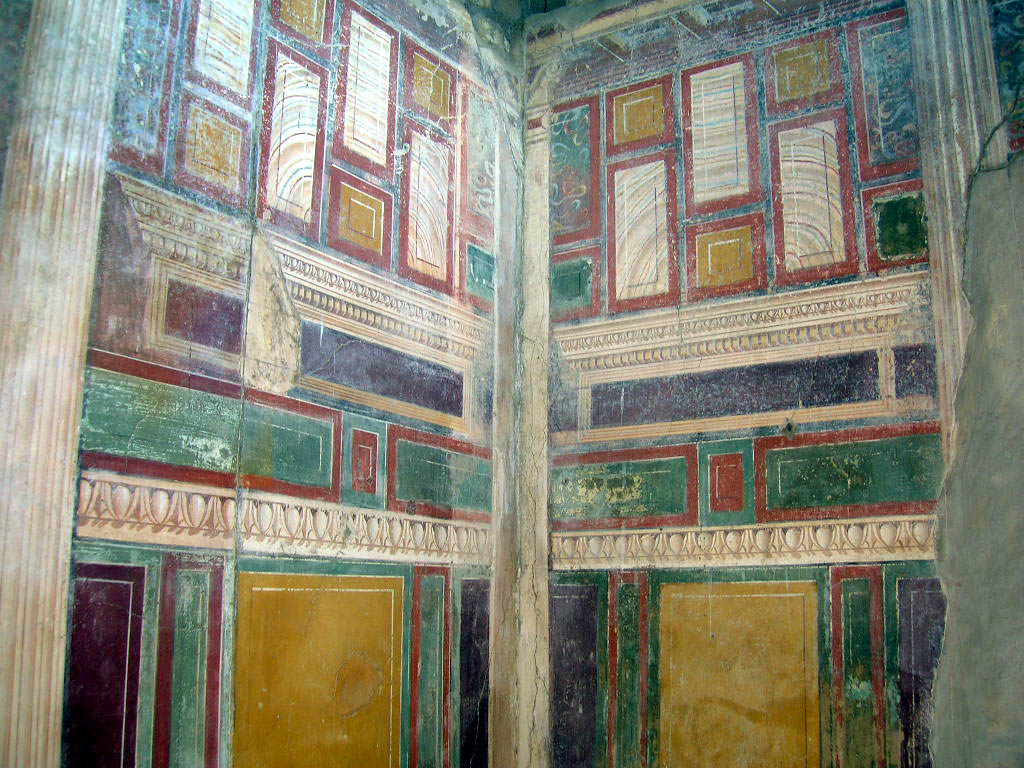
Detail of mural at Villa di Arianna, in late or transitional First Style. Castellammare di Stabia

The First Style, also referred to as stonework or inlay – named after crustae, stony plaques of covering – was in evidence from the 2nd century BC to the year AD 80 and is in essence abstract. Its origins are obscure, but it seems to have derived from the painting employed in the decoration of Greek temples and altars, and was adapted for the decoration of dwellings all around the Mediterranean by the late 4th century BC Good examples survive in southern Russia, the Near East, Sicily, France, Spain, Carthage, and Egypt. It is characterized by the imitation of the effect of stonework, with the application of bright colors over plaster divided into square areas in relief, simulating stone blocks and their colors and textures. As Roman houses had few windows to the outside, the interior walls tended to be continuous, and the First Style seeks to emphasize this unity by creating integrated environments. In John Clarke's opinion, the dependence on surface relief for the visual efficiency of this style makes it more a domain of architectural decoration than of painting itself.

Over time friezes decorated with floral patterns, arabesques and human figures were added, and other architectural elements such as simulated columns and cornices. By the time of the 1st century BC, this type of decoration had already developed in Roman territory a complexity and refinement that greatly distanced it from its Greek prototypes. The areas of color began to no longer obey the design of the relief, going beyond its borders and generating interesting illusionistic effects. The interest in color combinations contributes to increasingly dissociate the style from its structural origin, employing shades never found in real stone and eminently decorative geometric patterns that subvert the logic of architecture, which leads to the formation of the Second Style.

=== Second Style ===
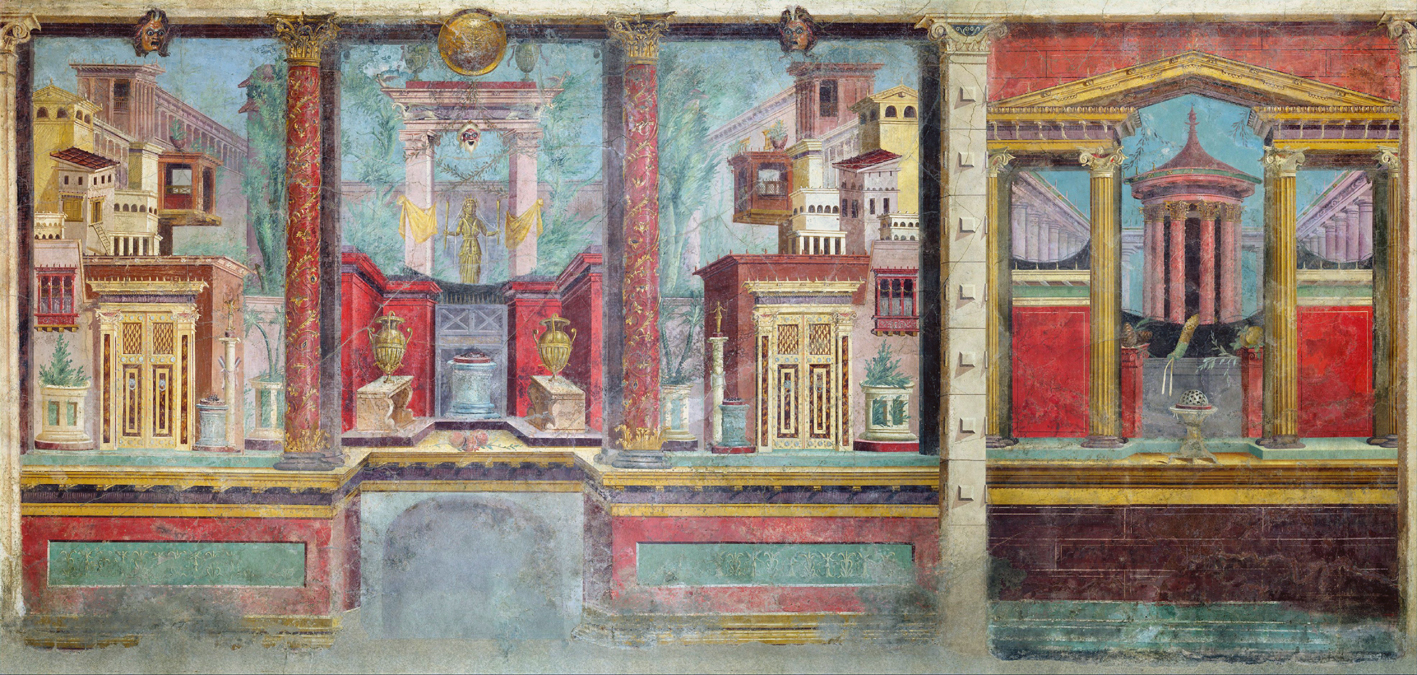
Mural at the House of Publius Fannius Synistor in Boscoreale

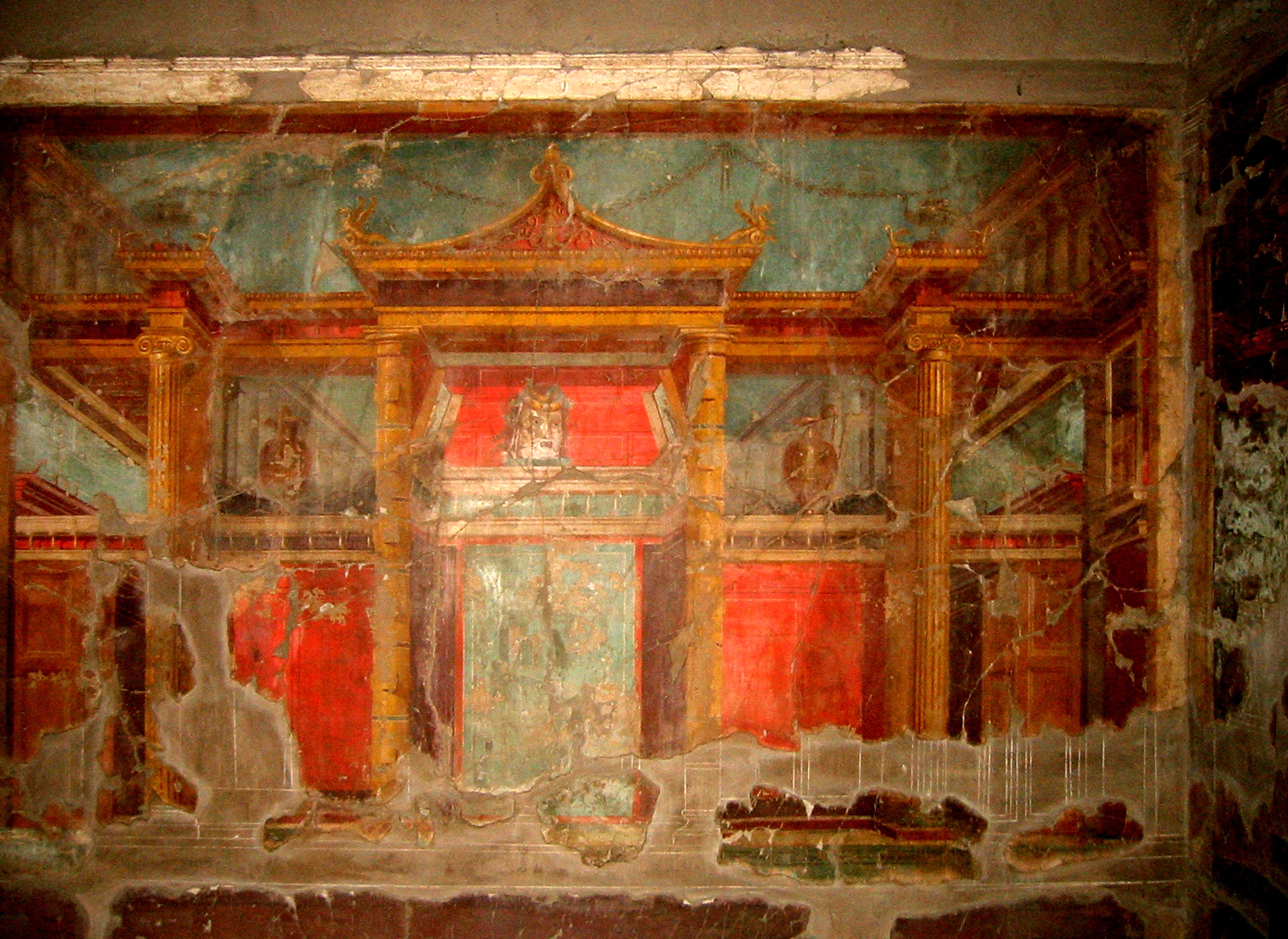
Villa de Oplontis, Torre Annunziata

The Second Style, called architectural, flourished relatively quickly from the First around 80 B.C., although precursor examples date from the third century BC and are spread over a wide region from Etruria to Asia Minor, where it was used in Hellenistic palaces to display the wealth of the great personages. Its first Italian example is in the "House of the Griffins" in Rome, and its appearance coincides with the taste for ostentation of that period. Trompe-l'oeil illusions become more effective and varied, with the multiplication of simulated architectural elements, such as colonnades, architraves, balustrades, moldings, windows and friezes, and more detailed and complicated geometric patterns appear. The unified, solid effect of the First Style walls dissolves and rooms seem to open outward, offering views of cityscapes and gardens, evidencing a very correct use of perspective to give the impression of three-dimensionality and accommodate the visual recesses in the corners of rooms. Thematic decorative schemes based on the differentiated use of spaces also begin to develop. The large social meeting and repast rooms are decorated with preferred axes of vision that form complex scenes designed to create a hierarchically organized visual script, usually with a centralized main scene that unfolds into secondary scenes in the less visible parts. As the style matured around 60 BC this programmatic plan was further emphasized. With the Second Style, Roman painting began its mature phase, developing original technical, aesthetic and symbolic resources.

Second Style painting required the integration of the work between architect and decorator, as extensive use of painted perspective could negate or detract from the effect of the actual architecture. The painter had to know how to handle a large repertoire of techniques to produce a convincing illusion in large panels that covered entire rooms in a unified scheme, and he also had to know the means of pictorial representation of a wide variety of materials and inanimate objects, including stone and bronze vases, theatrical masks, fountains, gilded ornaments, and glass objects. The design was developed in a smaller scale on paper, and then transferred to the walls through a grid system, sectioning the drawing and facilitating its enlargement.

A celebrated representative of the Second Style, though atypical for the dominant presence of the human figure, is in the triclinium of the Villa of the Mysteries in Pompeii, an admirable series of scenes with people on a natural scale set against an architectural panorama that resembles a theater stage set. The scenes have a controversial interpretation, it may be that they depict initiation rites into the Mysteries of Dionysus and/or pre-nuptial ordinances. Although strongly figurative, the architectural influence reminiscent of the earlier style is revealed in the very statuesque modeling of the figures, with a secure and high-quality but somewhat rigid design, accentuating their monumental and rationally organized character. The ensemble is energized by the vibrant coloring and the variety of attitudes of the figures.

The late phase of the Second Style, from c. 40–30 BC, proceeds toward simplification, avoiding the ostentation of luxury in favor of more sober environments, fitting the austerity of Augustus' rule, not without the protest of some like Vitruvius, who deplored the replacement of the earlier solid architecture with more elegant and lighter models, which incorporate animal, vegetable, and human figure forms, along with arabesques, panoply, and ornaments of an abstract, miniaturized, and fanciful character, which suggests oriental influence. The frescoes of the Villa of Farnesina and the Villa of Livia in Rome are among the last examples of the Second Style, already in a transition to the next phase.

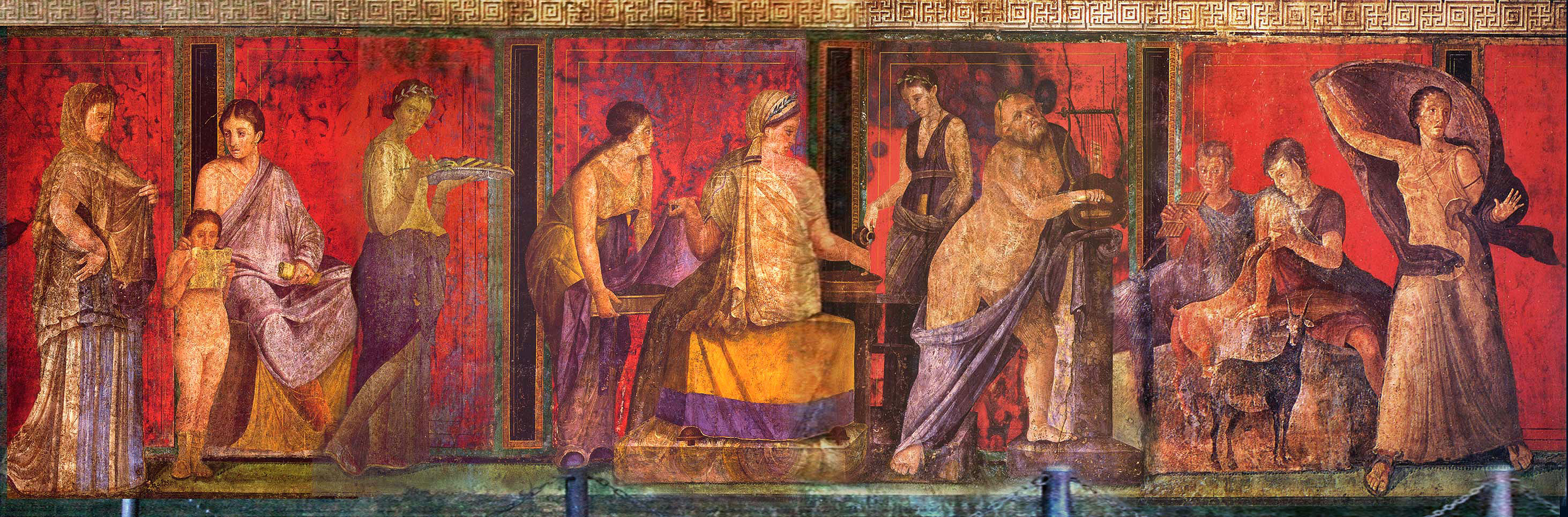
Initiation to the Cult of Demeter, fresco from the Villa of the Mysteries, Pompeii

=== Third Style ===
The Third Style, or ornamental, represents the continuity of the Second in a freer and more ornate, lighter and less pompous version. Its main constituent elements reflect an eclecticism common to all art of the Augustan period, and include a classicizing tendency, a taste for copying or deriving from ancient Greek and Hellenistic authors, the influence of Egyptian art, and the flourishing of the landscape genre. Perspective scenes no longer tend to "pierce" the walls; the depth effect is flattened, giving only modest virtual expansion to the actual space of the room. Tiny details and Egyptian motifs commemorating the triumphs of Augustus and Agrippa in Egypt proliferate, dark colors appear – some rooms are completely black – and a metalinguistic technique is developed in the representation of paintings within paintings. Its first examples date from c. 15 BC, located in the pyramid tomb of Gaius Cestius in Rome, although they are not of great quality. Much higher samples are in a villa possibly owned by Agrippa Postumus in Boscotrecase, near Pompeii, but their dating is uncertain, and may be many years later. Von Blanckenhagen considers the Farnesina frescoes the founding landmark of the Third Style, dating them to c. 19 BC, but his conclusions are controversial.

The minimization of the importance of architectural perspective in this period allowed the painters a division of labor – the masters were responsible for the landscape scenes, while the architectural frames were the responsibility of subordinate assistants, which was also reflected in the salary each one received. The parietars (parietarii), the painters of the frames, were paid half of what the imagineers (imaginarii), the creators of the landscape scenes and figures, earned. The imaginarii had to master an even broader thematic spectrum than the Second Style painters, and had to be able to recreate historical settings from various eras and depict human figures in a wide variety of pursuits. Painting acquired a dominant role in interior decoration. Whereas before complex figurative and polychrome mosaics were drawn on the floor, which competed visually with the parietal painting and made little hierarchical discrimination between the different surfaces of the room, attention now focused on the scenes painted on ceilings and walls, and floors began to be decorated with simple geometric patterns in black and white or discreet colors, which served as a visual resting area and directed the gaze upward instead of drawing it downward. On the other hand, the viewer no longer had to take in the whole at once, as was expected in the previous period, and could enjoy it in a progressive itinerary, as if strolling through a gallery of framed pictures, although the frames themselves were still fictitious, painted directly on the wall. The symbolism surrounding the owner of an elegant villa was also changing, and what was intended then was to show him as a cultured and discreet connoisseur of art, no longer as the exhibitionist patrician of the late-Republican period.

In this period worked the painter Studio, whom Pliny reputed as the creator of the landscape genre of decoration – although the evidence revealed by recent research indicates that the genre had been cultivated longer ago. In any case his influence was enormous, and Vitruvius also held him in high regard. By this time the theater was also rapidly gaining popularity, and one finds many compositions showing actors on stage, while the themes of popular life likewise multiplied. The Third Style flourished until c. AD 25, when it began a transition of about twenty years to the Fourth Style. In this interval the flattened perspective again gave way to more striking illusions of depth. The scenes were reduced to small centralized panels, framed by elements of fanciful, even extravagant and irrational architecture, subdivided into compartmentalized areas, enriched with new motifs – wreaths, candelabras, thyrsus – elaborated in a linear treatment of great attention to detail. Also important in the Third Style was the reaffirmation of the human figure, which in the next phase would be greatly explored.

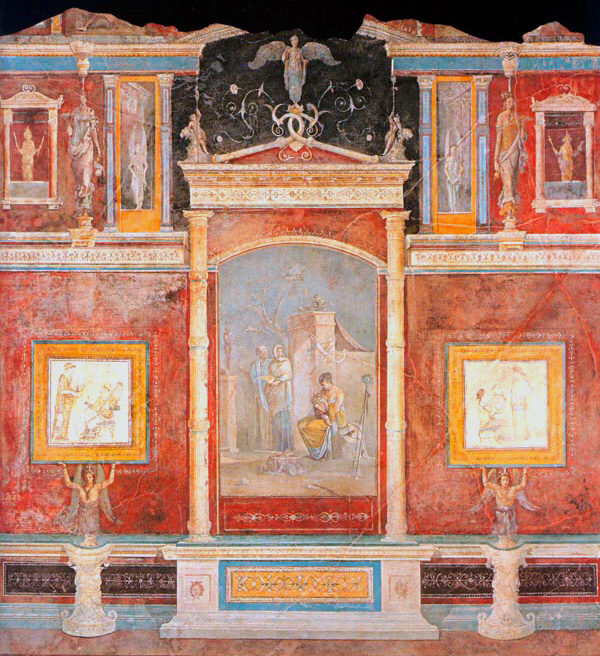
Fresco at Villa della Farnesina, Rome. Second Style transitioning to the Third

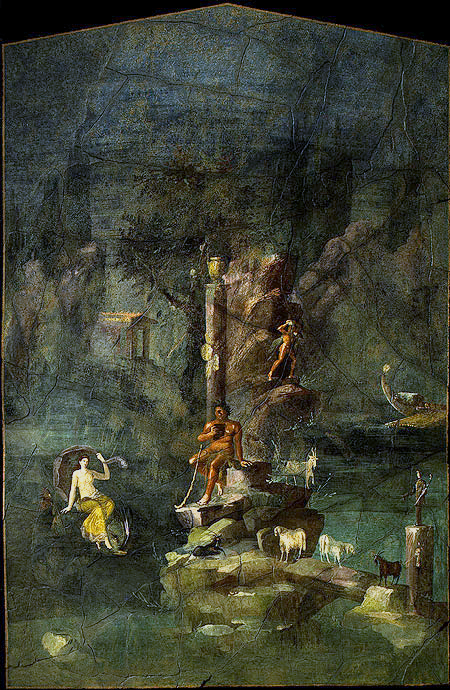
Imperial villa, Boscotrecase

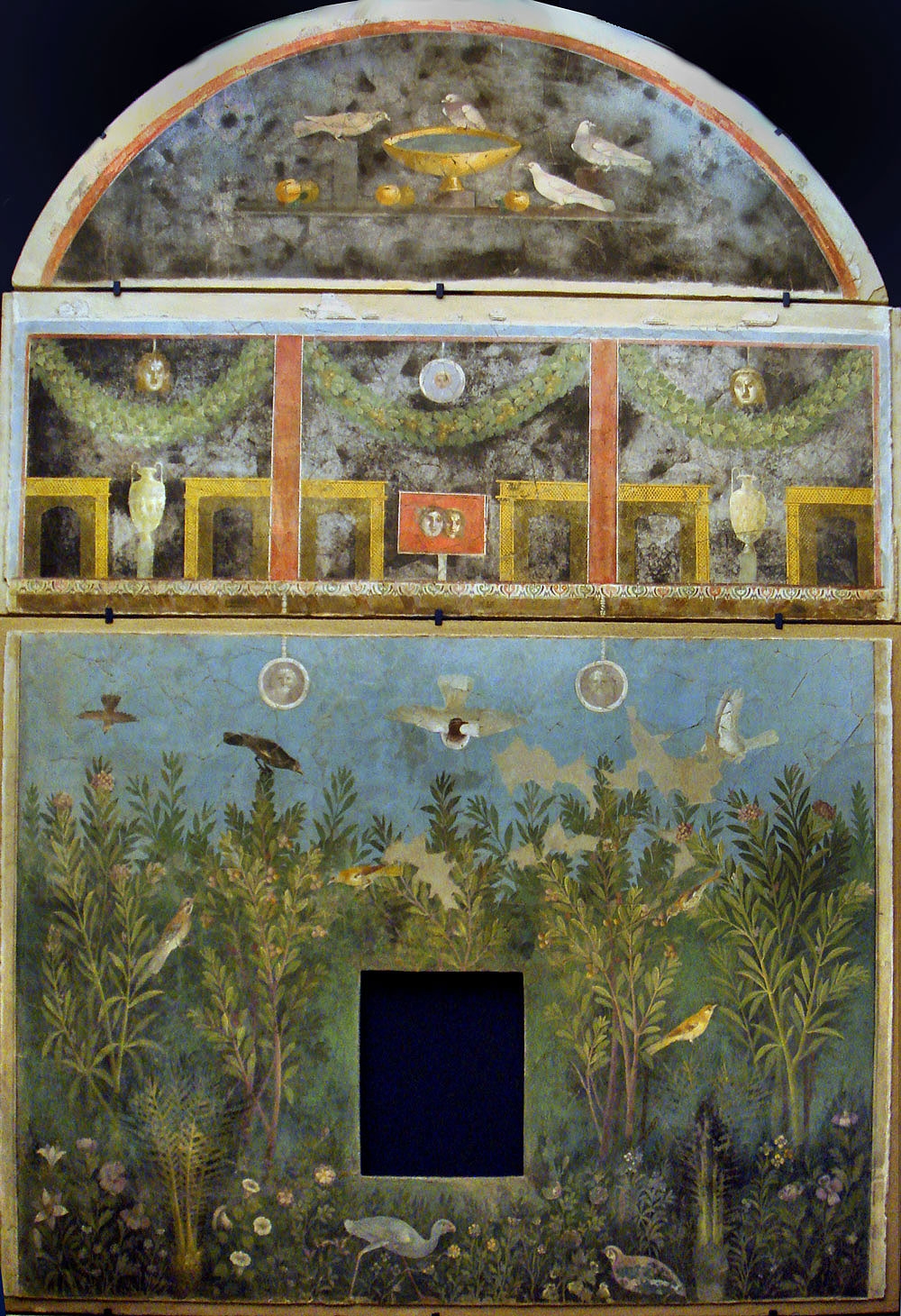
Garden Room: Ancient Roman fresco from the House of the Golden Bracelet, Pompeii

Villa of Agrippa Postumus, Boscotrecase

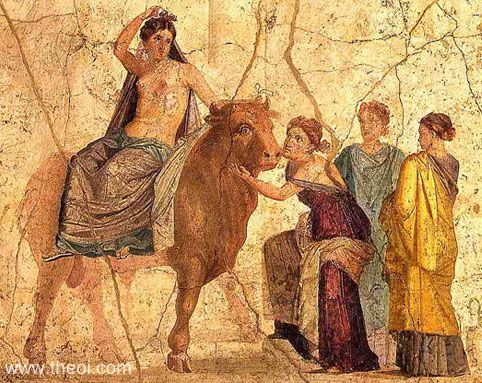
Europa riding a bull, fresco of Pompeii, National Archaeological Museum of Naples
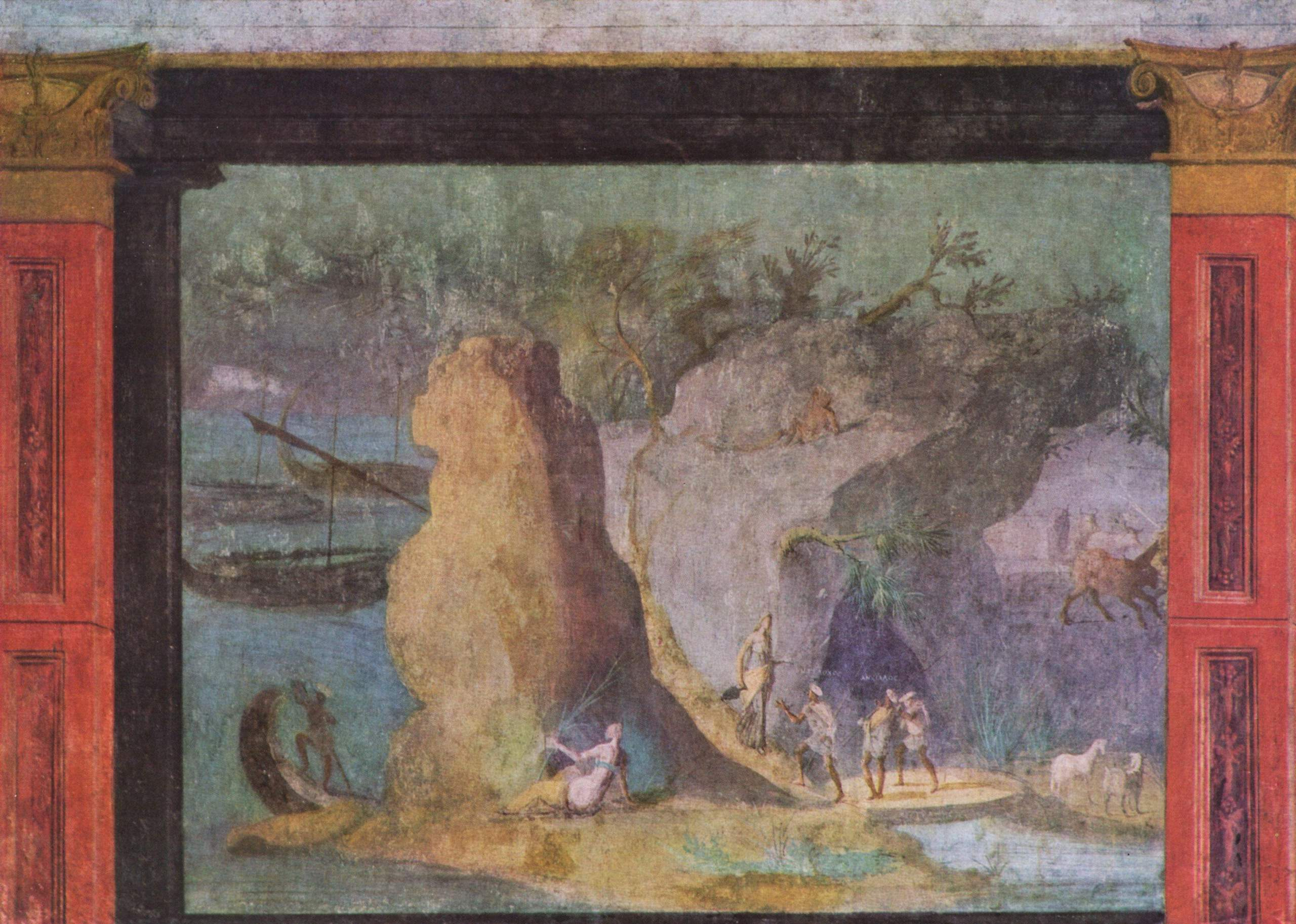
Scene from The Odyssey, Villa di via Graziosa on the Esquiline Hill, Rome

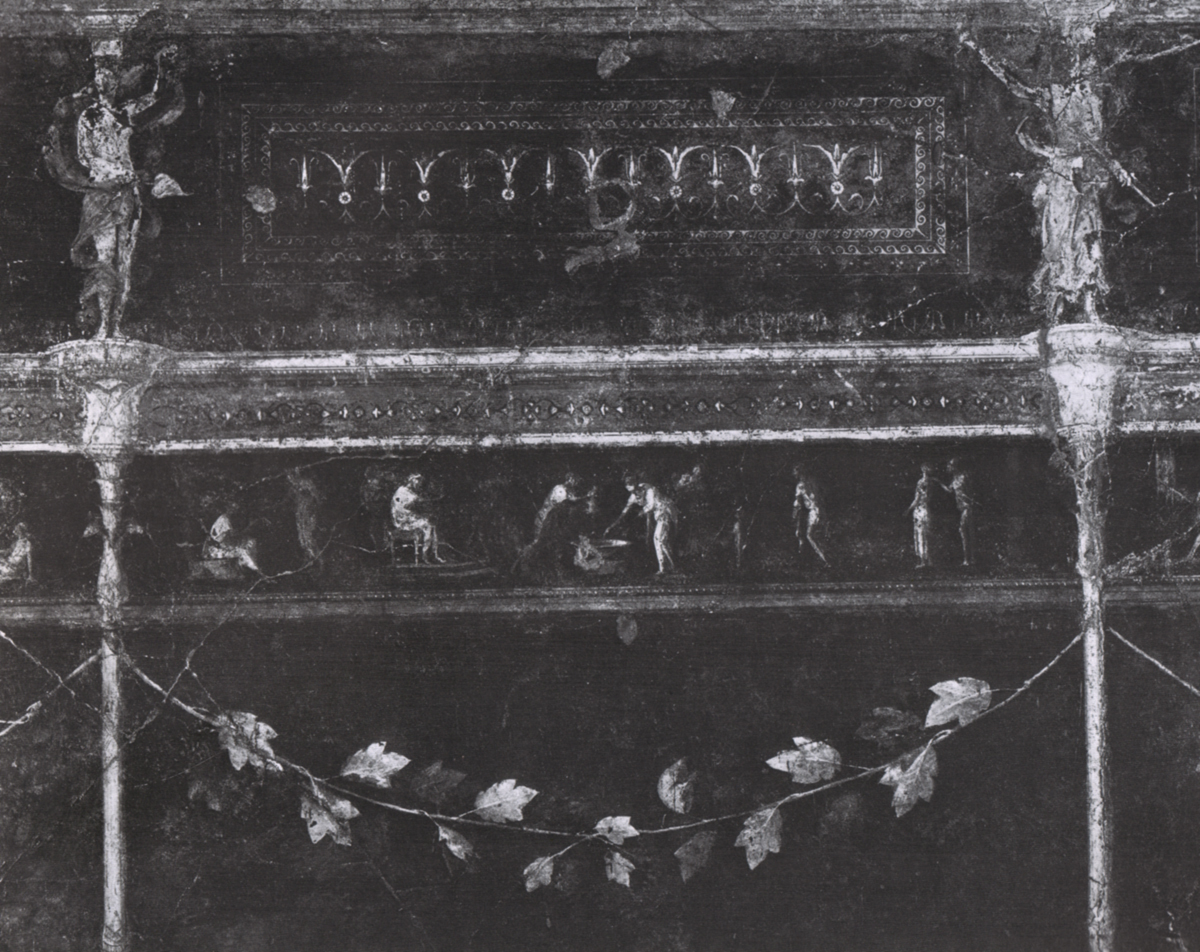
Black Room of Villa della Farnesina, Rome

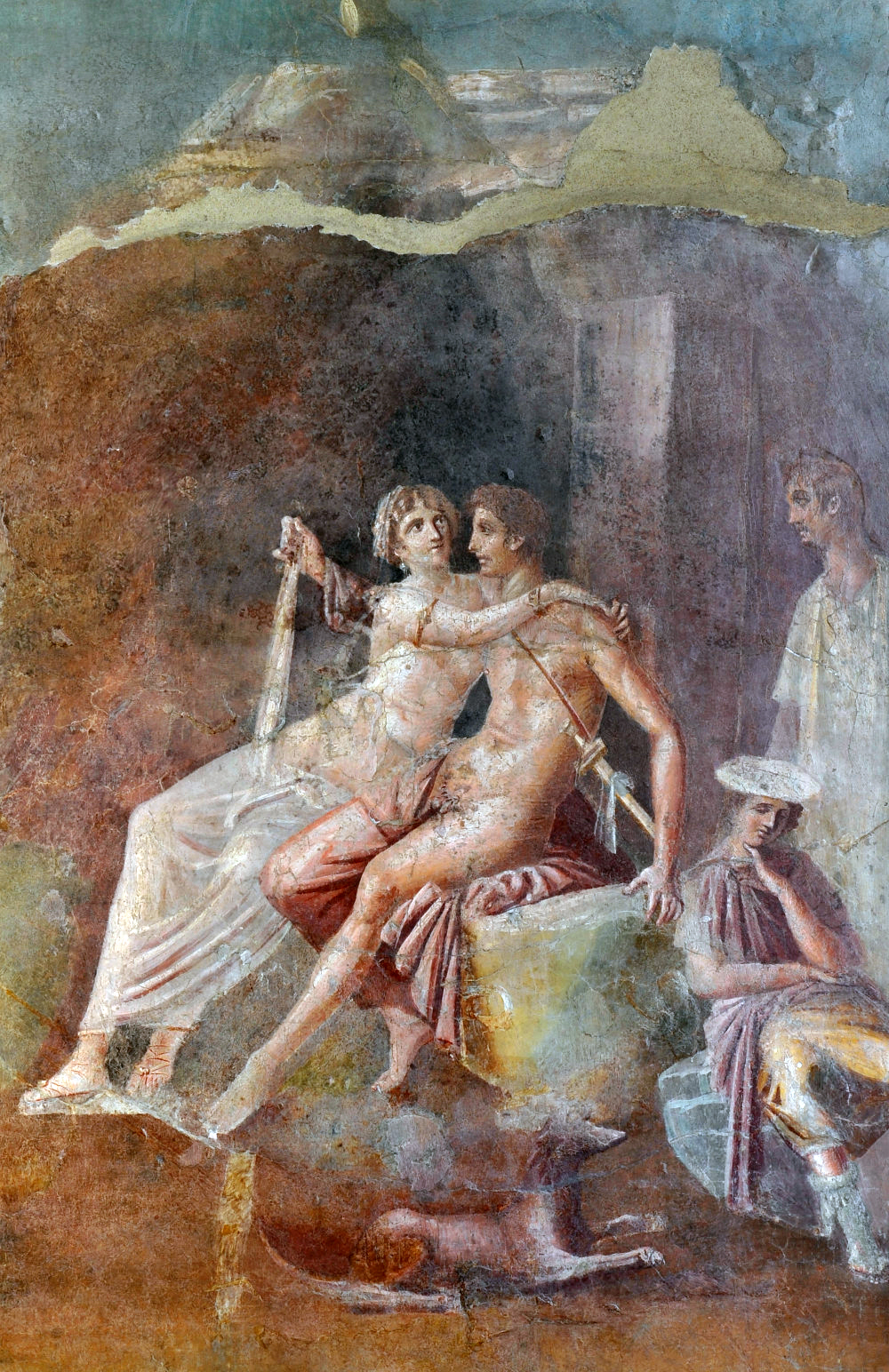
Dido and Aeneas, House of Citharist, Pompeii

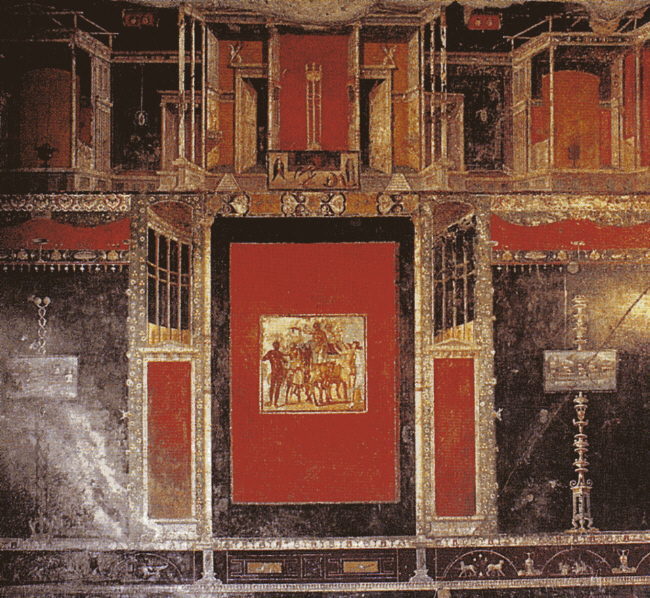
Lucretius Fronto's House, Pompeii. Third Late Style

=== Fourth Style ===
Finally the Fourth Style appeared around 45 BC and, even more than its predecessor, can only be defined through the word eclecticism, recovering elements from previous styles and elaborating on them in new configurations. Some of its most obvious generic characteristics are an inclination toward more asymmetrical compositions, a tendency to use warmer and brighter colors, and a greater refinement, variety, and freedom in ornamentations. In addition to these, the figures are more animated, the brushstroke technique has become freer, with intensive use of dashes for shadows and volumes, approaching pointillist effects, and the pictorial simulation of tapestries through the use of large areas of a single color, with ornamental borders and bands, is popular. Ling described the Fourth Style as less disciplined and more whimsical than its predecessors, being at its best delicate and dazzling, but in unskilled hands it could become messy and overloaded. It is the style of which we have the greatest amount of relics, and precisely because of the abundance of evidence it is the phase we can best study, but its evolution is made difficult to clarify because of its heterogeneity. Some of the first examples of the Fourth Style, still in transition from the Third, can be seen in the House of the Tuscan Colonnade and in the House of Lucretius Fronto, in Herculaneum, and in the House of the Mirror and the House of Menander, in Pompeii. Further noteworthy are the decorations of the House of Neptune, the House of the Golden Cupids, the House of the Lovers, the Imperial Villa and the House of the Vettii in Pompeii, the basilica at Herculaneum and the Golden House in Rome.

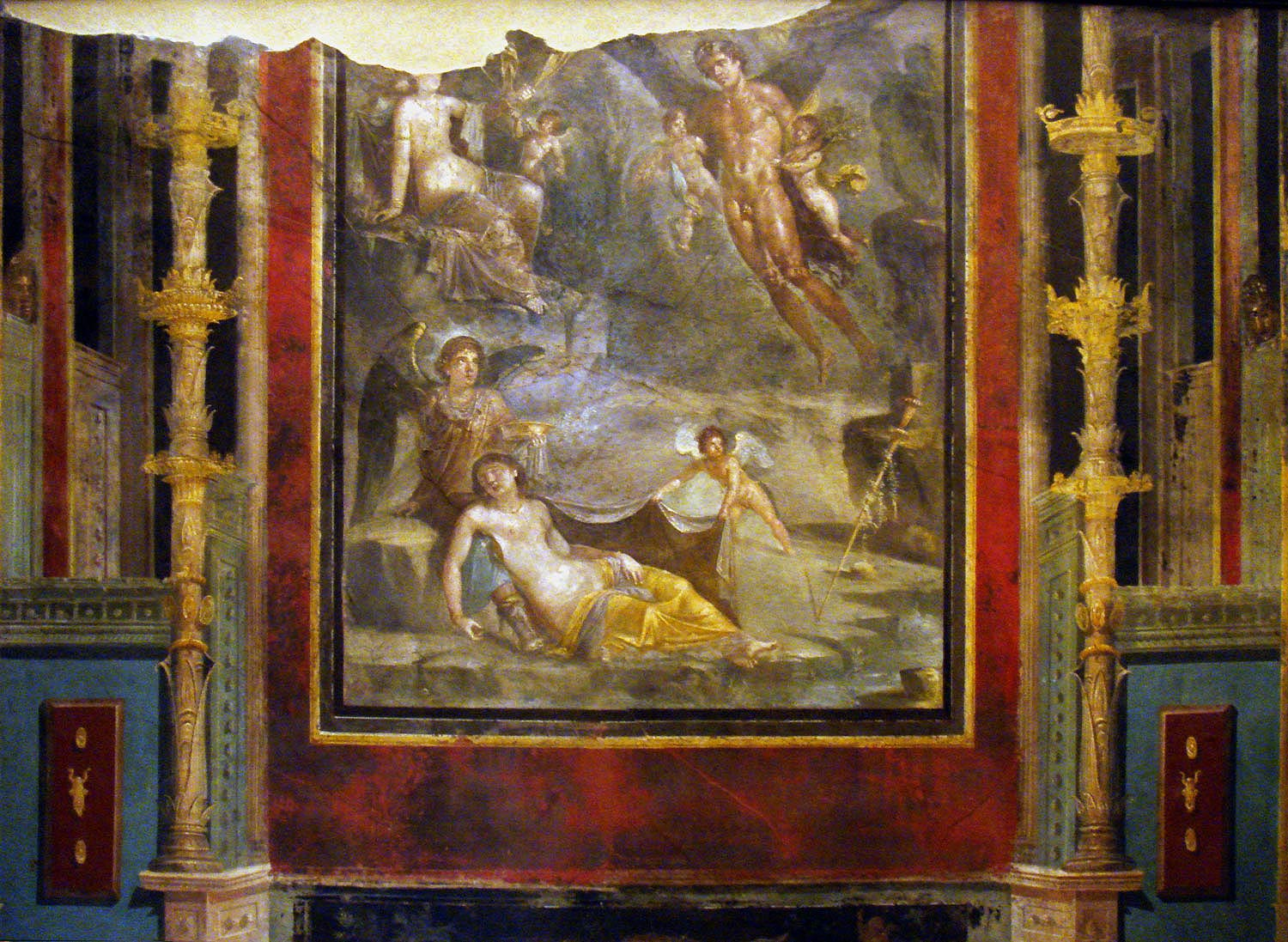
The wedding of Zephyrus and Chloris, House of Naviglio, Pompeii

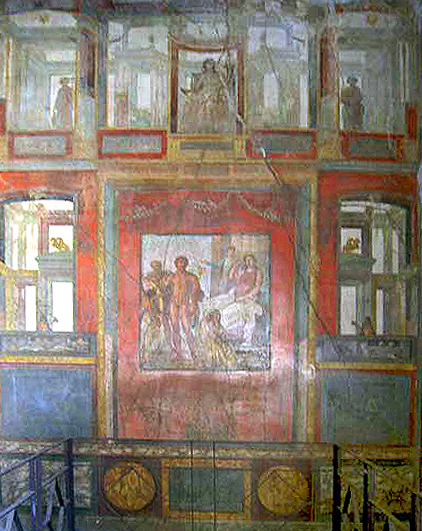
House of the Vettii, Pompeii

Also during the Fourth Style there was an increase in the pictorial decoration of the ceilings, with a much wider variety of plastic solutions, much more fanciful than in previous phases, but with the predominance of centralized schemes that propagated in concentric patterns, and with greater integration between painting and stucco reliefs. John Clarke proposed the subdivision of this phase into four main modes of expression – Tapestry, Plain, Theatrical or Scenographic, and Baroque – rather than a description through chronology, since several trends coexist. But the variety of solutions is very large, and this subdivision is not a unanimous one among researchers, many of them preferring to avoid strict delimitations in a context characterized by multiplicity. Nevertheless, a brief description of these types can shed auxiliary light on understanding the polymorphous Fourth Style.

- The Tapestry type appeared before the others by about a decade, and then merged with the others. Its name derives from imitating the effect of tapestry – which had become a fashion in interior decoration – by establishing areas with independent treatment from one another and borders and stripes simulating bangs and brocades. The colors were also changed, with a diversification in the palette and bright, light tones becoming dominant again.
- The Plana mode emphasizes the two-dimensionality of the wall, alternating surfaces of pure color with others showing scenes in delimited areas, and its effect is based on contrasts. This mode is usually found in less luxurious houses, it was simpler and cheaper, but a skilled craftsman could produce with it an impression of remarkable elegance with very succinct means.
- The Scenographic mode has been associated with Nero, whose taste for exciting novelties and the theater led to the development of decoration based on theatrical sets. His Transitional House (Domus Transitoria) and the Golden House (Domus Aurea), two rich palaces he had built, were ornamented with such paintings. When the ruins of the Golden House were rediscovered at the time of the Renaissance, its decoration caused an immediate and electrifying effect. Many important artists of the time, such as Raphael, Michelangelo, Ghirlandaio, Heemskerck and Lippi rushed there to see what was considered a real revelation, many of them leaving their own autographs on the walls. As the ruins were buried underground, they were at first thought to be part of an artificial grotto (grotta, in Italian), and for this reason its decorative panels, extravagant and delicate at the same time, were given the name grottesque (grottesche), which became a Renaissance fever and were imitated for palace decoration in many countries. Phamulus is regarded as the inventor of the Scenographic mode, and Pliny once again gives us interesting information:

More recently lived Phamulus, a grave and serious character, but a painter in the flowery style. By this artist there is a Minerva who has the appearance of always looking at the viewer, from whatever point one looks. He only paints for a few hours each day, and then with great gravity, since he always keeps his robe on, even in the midst of his duties. Nero's gilded palace was the prison of this artist's works, and therefore little can be seen anywhere else.

- The Baroque mode, as the word suggests, shows great exuberance and vitality and the treatment of the figures tends to be dramatic, with a technique of great freedom in the brush stroke that makes frequent use of the dashed line to create the effect of chiaroscuro and volume and elaborate color mixing. The scenes in the Basilica of Herculaneum, the House of Naviglio in Pompeii, and the Rooms of Pentheus and Ixion in the House of the Vécios are good examples of this trend.
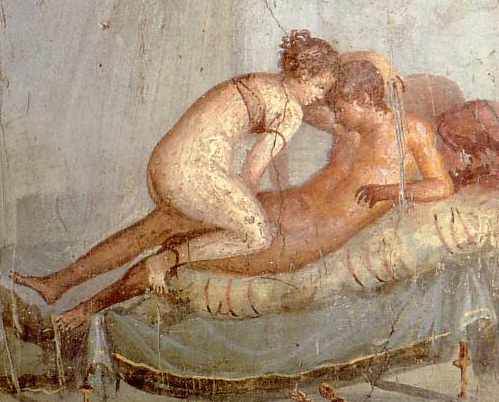
Love act, Centennial House, Pompeii

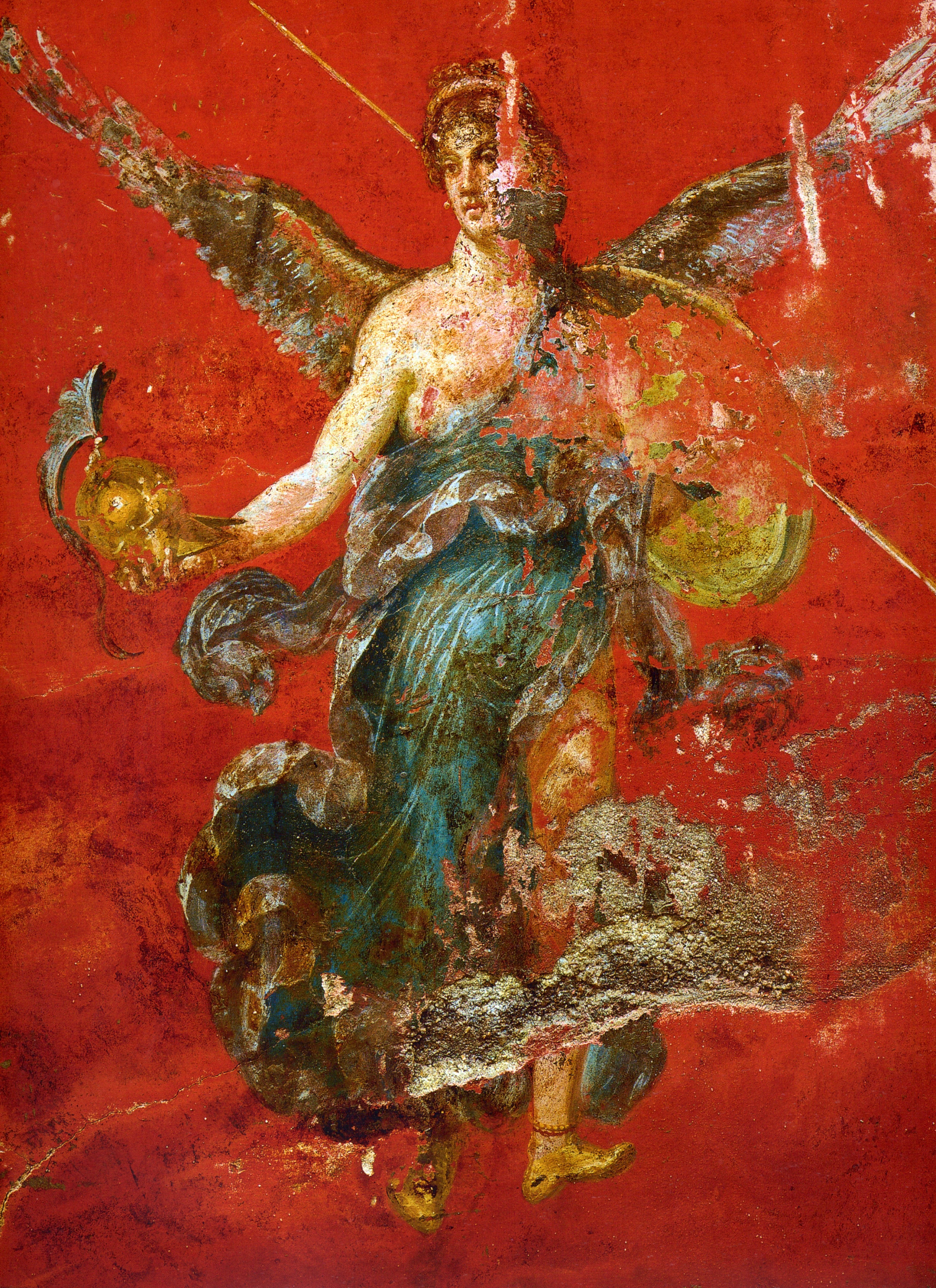
Musa, Hospice of the Sulpicians (Hospitium dei Sulpicii), Pompeii

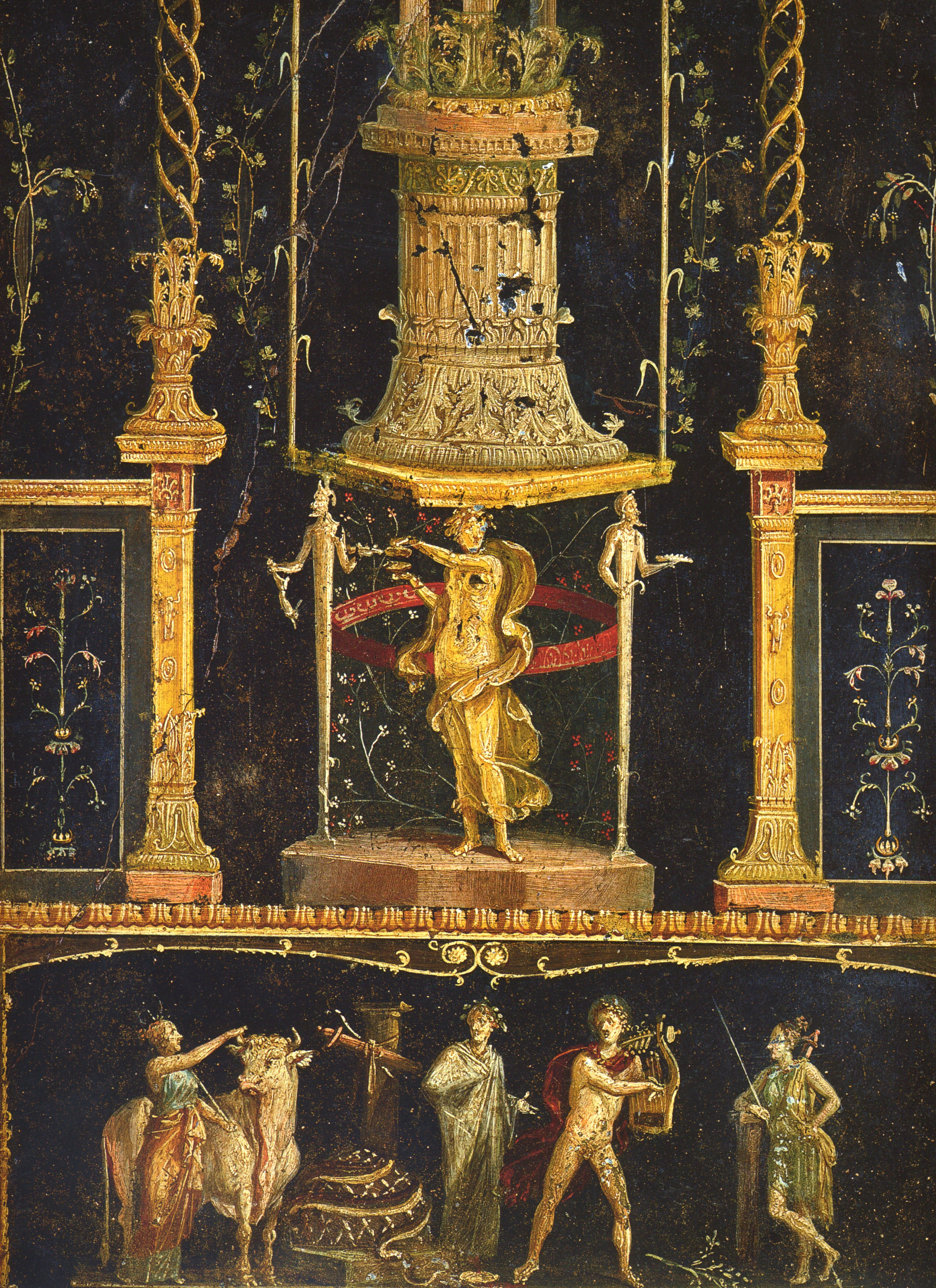
House of the Vettii, Pompeii

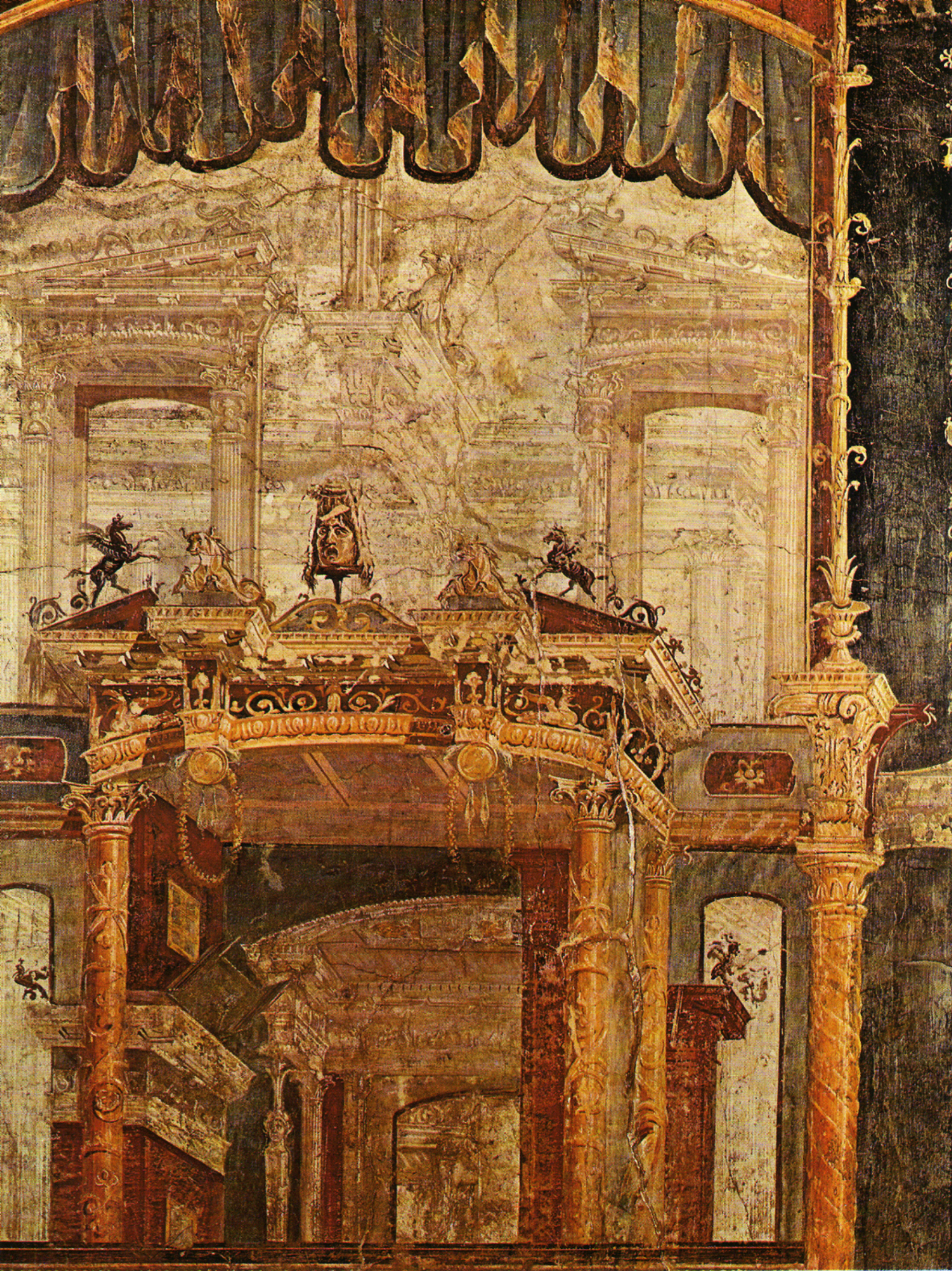
Basilica of Herculaneum

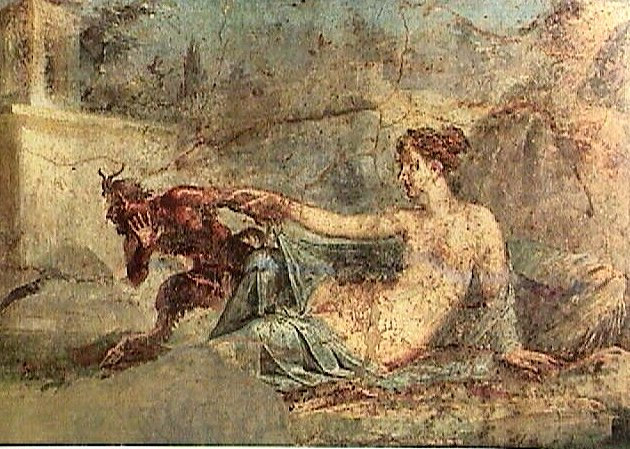
Pan and Hermaphroditus, fresco in Pompeii, National Archaeological Museum of Naples
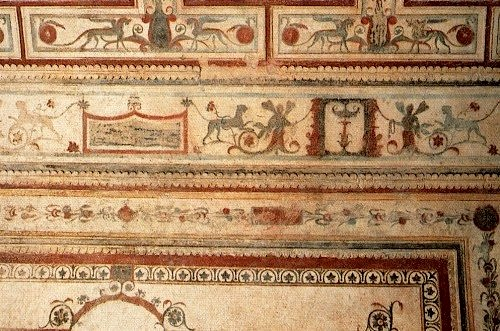
Golden House, Rome

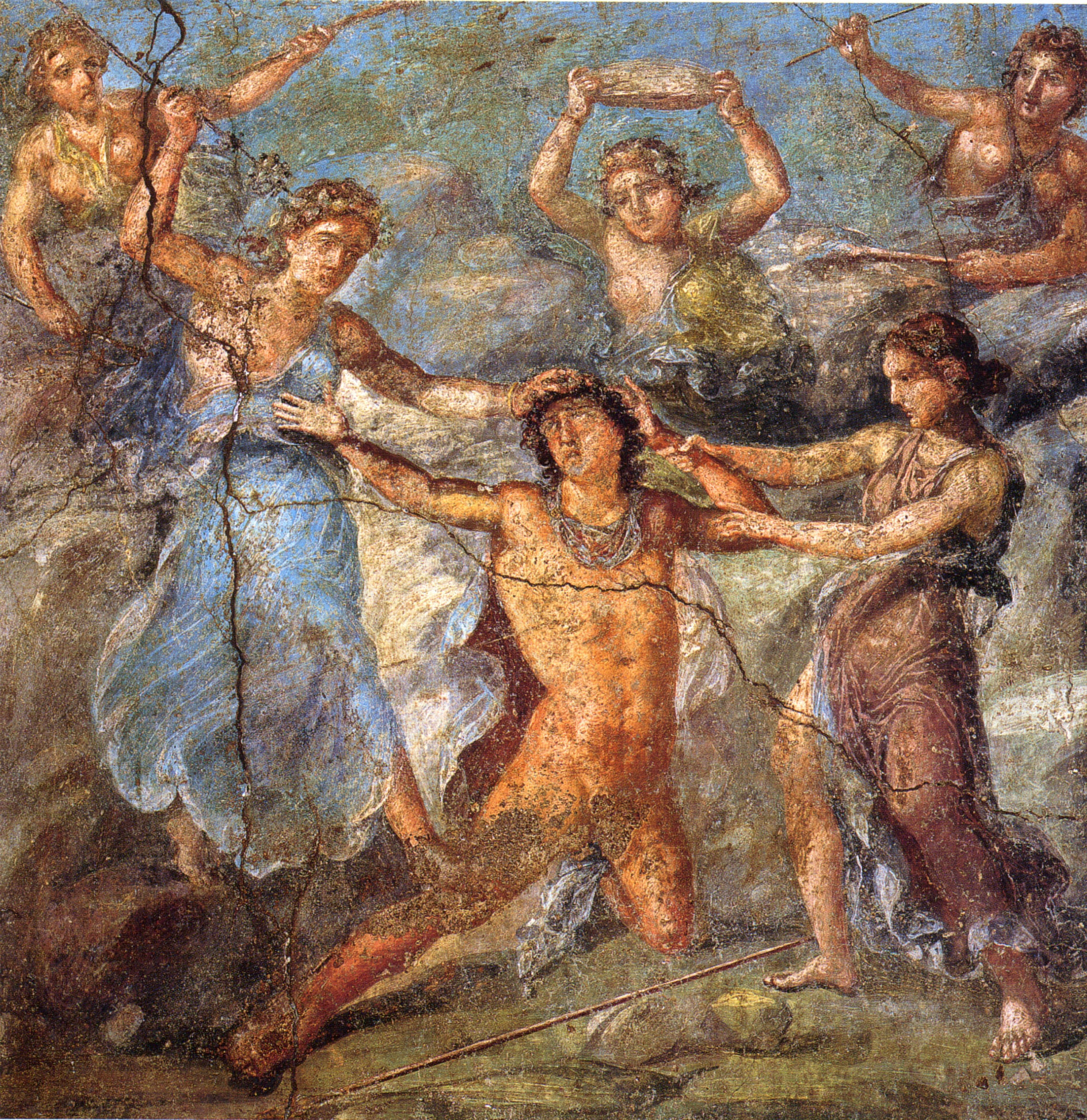
Pentheus, House of the Vettii, Pompeii

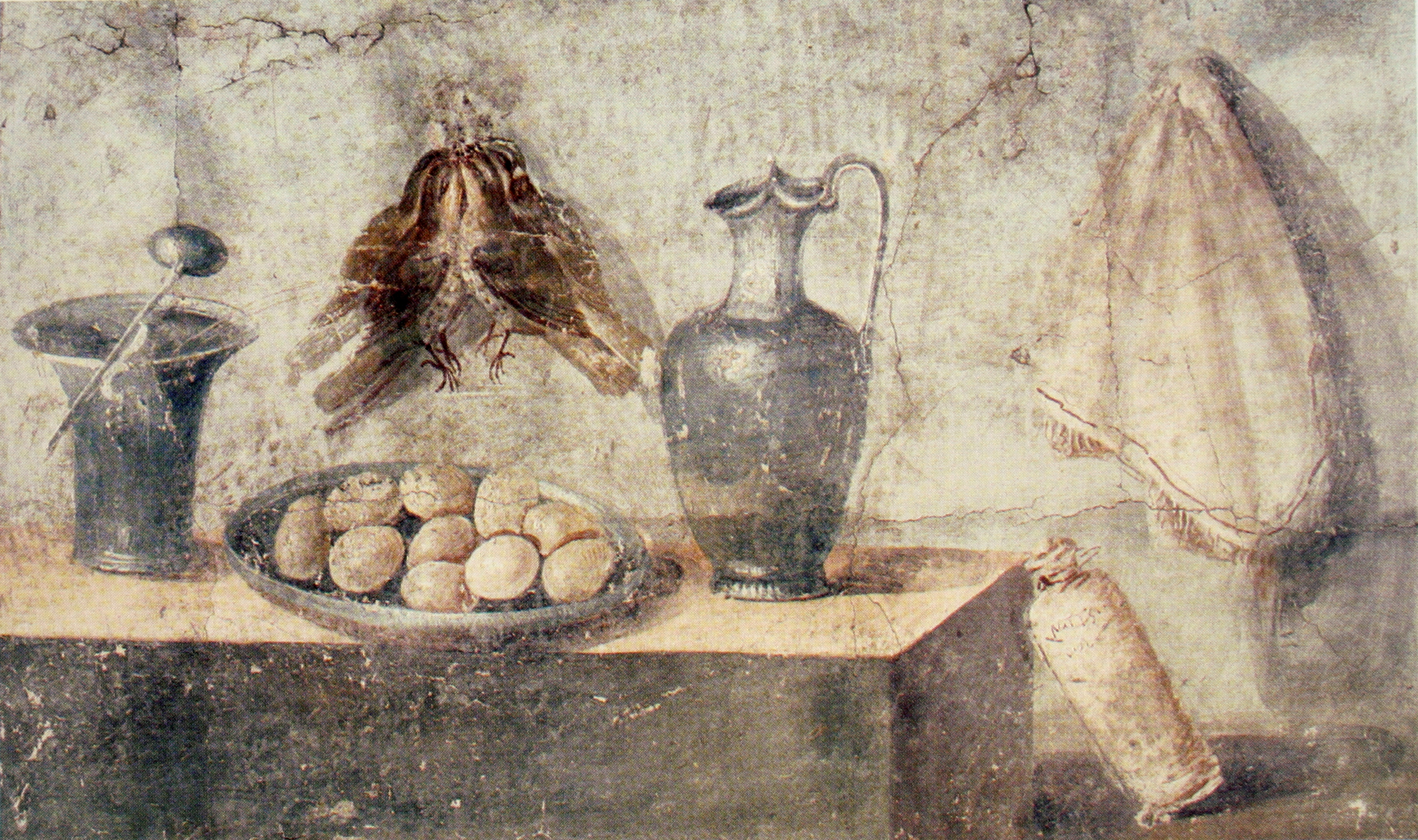
Still Life with eggs, birds and bronze dishes, Pompeia

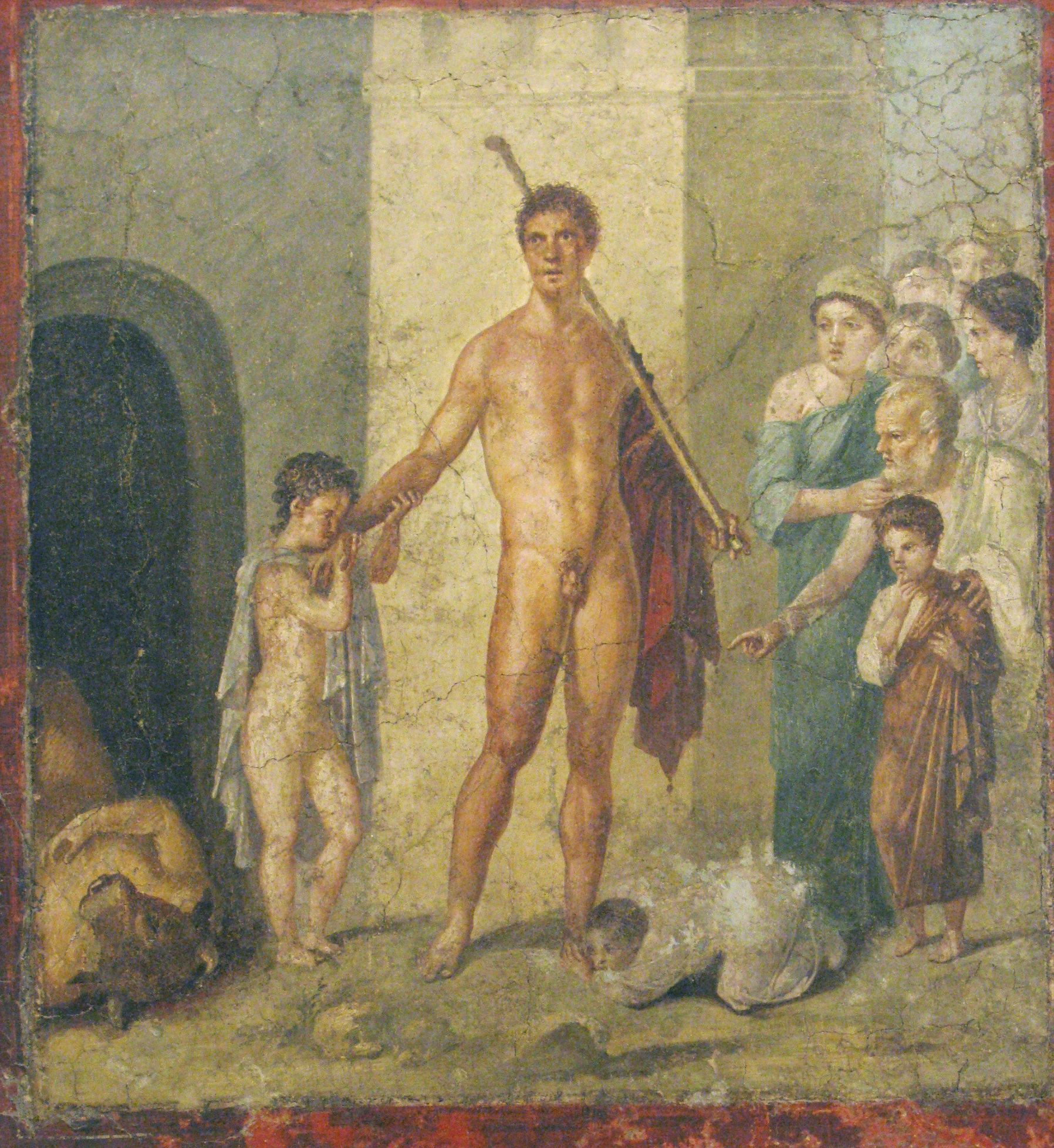
Theseus freeing the children from the Minotaur, National Archaeological Museum of Naples

== Particular genres ==
=== Portraits ===
Portraits deserve a separate comment because they were an important element in the Roman religious and social system. The custom of portraying the dead had a long tradition. In the hearths of the residences, sacred spaces, effigies of the ancestors were installed as a perpetual homage, and in processions organized by the elites, family portraits appeared prominently, to attest their patrician lineage. These effigies could be sculpted in the form of busts or heads, modeled in wax or terracotta as mortuary masks, or painted on medallions and shields, and used to present detailed physiognomic characterization, making one believe that they were faithful portraits. When the use of burials became widespread, replacing the cremations of the dead, this type of image also became part of the sepulchral contexts.

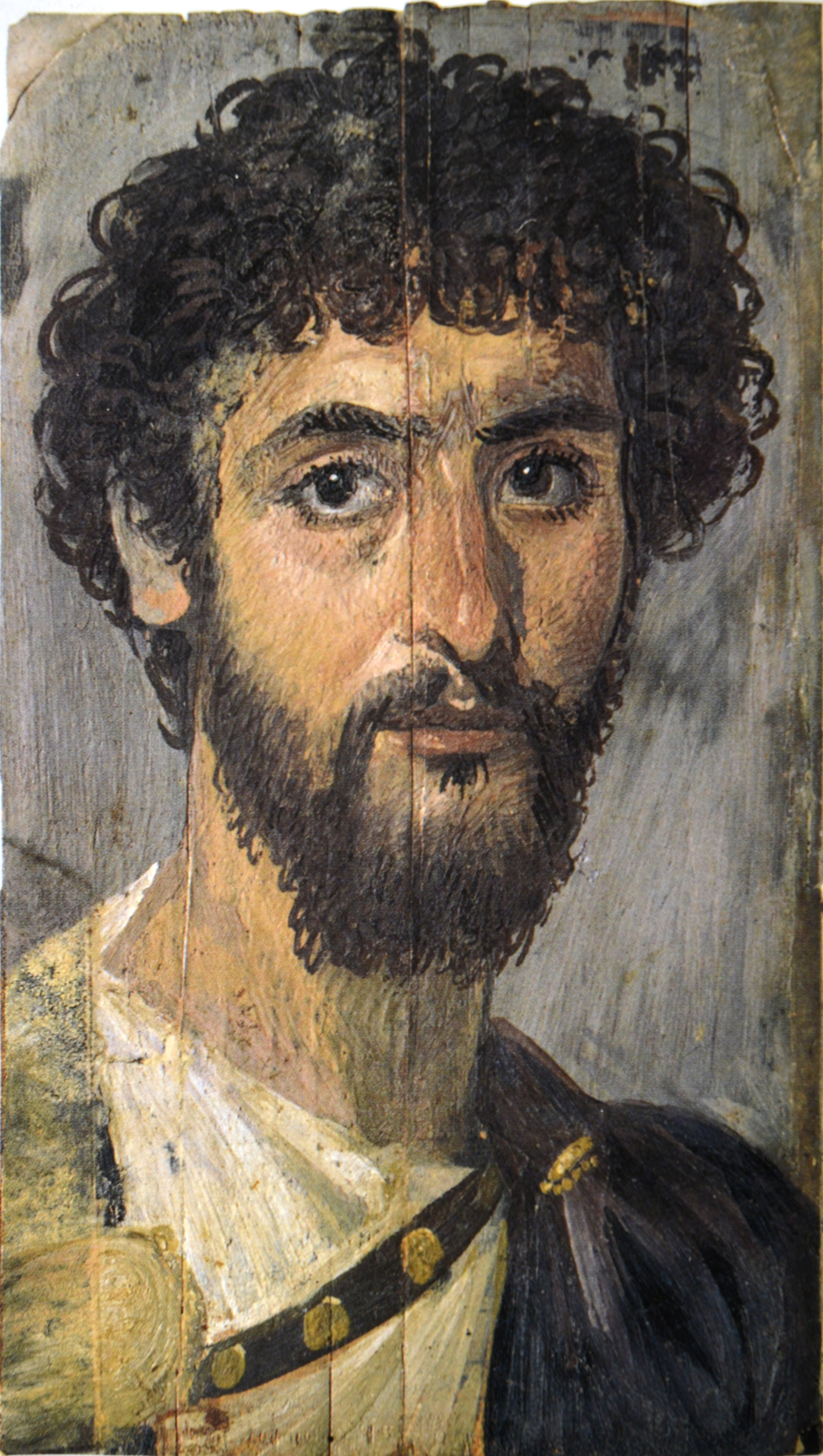
Funeral portrait, man with beard. Fayum

The use of portraiture was not exclusive to the Romans, since Hellenism it had become common throughout the Mediterranean, not only as a remembrance of the dead, but also as offerings to the gods and as praise of the living, especially emperors, generals and other personalities. But ordinary citizens could also have their faces eternalized in a portrait, because the painting technique was relatively inexpensive, unlike statuary. By Pliny's time, however, memorialistic practices were beginning to lose strength in the metropolis, although they still survived in the provinces. Painted portraits found in Italy are extremely rare. A few survive in Pompeii and Herculaneum, but the largest and most important collection of this genre of work was recovered in Roman Egypt, with the group of portraits of Faium being especially famous. Part of this group of about a thousand pieces exhibits a remarkable naturalism, and most of them date from the AD 1st to the 3rd century, made in encaustic or tempera. Portraits there were associated with mummification, and were placed over the face of the dead in the manner of mortuary masks, inside sarcophagi.

=== Landscapes and architectures ===
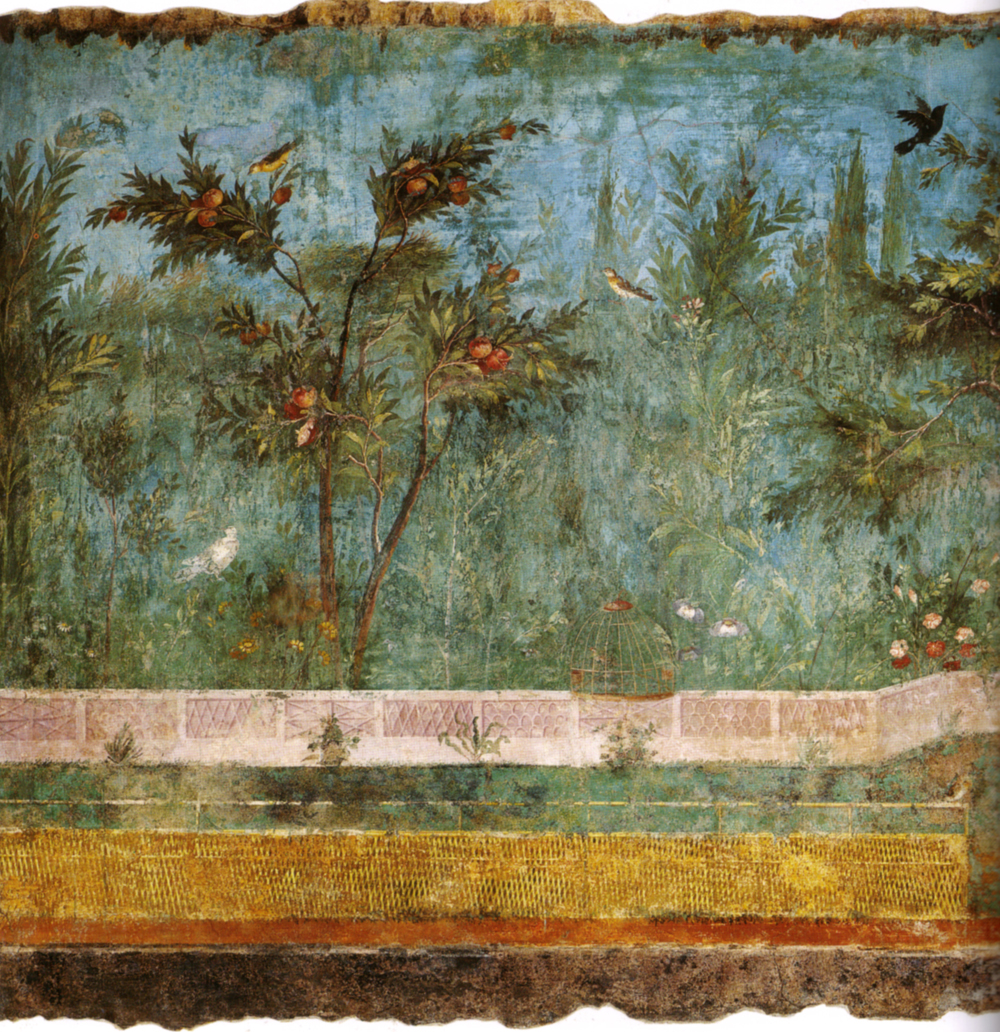
Fragment of landscape of Villa of Livia, Rome

Because of its importance for Western painting to this day, a more detailed treatment of the landscape genre, which flourished significantly among the Romans from the reign of Augustus onward, is also in order. There does not seem to have been a desire among the Romans to reproduce any real landscape, but rather they collected elements from various panoramas to compose fanciful and undifferentiated scenes. Landscapes are sometimes thought to have been a product of Alexandrian art, inspired by the bucolic poetry of Theocritus and related poets, but no examples have been retrieved from that region, and everything leads one to believe that it is an indigenous Italian genre, although possibly influenced by Hellenistic traditions. It was mentioned earlier that the inventor of the genre was Studio, as Pliny the Elder states so:

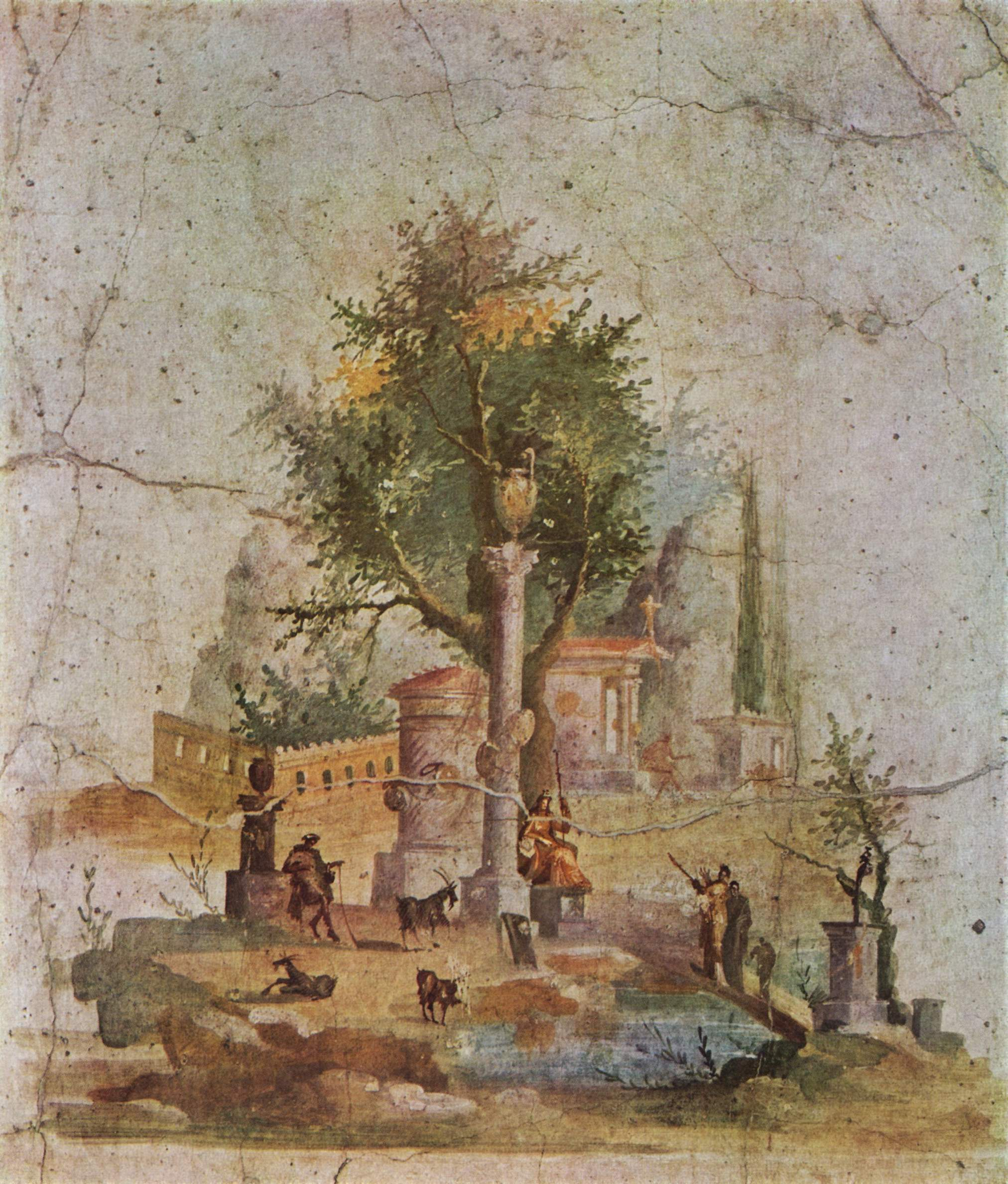
Sacro-idyllic type landscape at Villa Boscotrecase

It was he who first instituted that most delightful technique of painting walls with depictions of villas, porticoes and landscaped gardens, forests, mountains, lakes, canals, rivers, coastlines – in fact, every kind of thing one could wish for, and also many depictions of people within them walking or sailing, or, back on land, arriving at the villas on donkeys or in chariots, and also fishing, hunting or even plowing the land and harvesting grapes (. ...) and many other lively themes like these, indicative of a lively talent. This artist also began the practice of painting representations of seaside towns under the arcades of public galleries, thus producing delightful views at minimal cost.

But some experts do not believe that the Plinian statement is entirely correct, for recent research points to important precursor landscape examples such as the Garden of Livia, painted in her Roman villa, which, according to Boardman, Griffin & Murray, cannot be linked to Studio, but it is possible that he gave an innovative feature to a pre-existing tradition. This seems assured in view of the Roman preference of the imperial period for a depiction of nature where it was subdued, ordered and embellished by the human spirit, manifesting itself pictorially in the form of an interpenetration between complex architecture and formal cultivated gardens. This association was already found among the Greeks, who conventionalized nature to serve decorative purposes – as the notorious case of the stylized acanthus leaf of the Corinthian capitals – and was a tradition also in the Near East, whose horticultural practices were imitated by the Romans and were, according to Woksch, subordinated to rational architectural considerations. It was also in line with the ideological program of Augustus' time, which sought to express the idea that the Romans of the time lived in a world ruled by a divine will where order prevailed, an order that was preserved on earth by the divinized emperor. Many of these landscapes are commonly called "sacro-idyllic" because they depict a sanctuary or sacred monument around which various groups of characters gather, set against a backdrop of clear poetic and evocative qualities.

=== Triumphal paintings ===
Again Pliny tells us about the practice of triumphal painting in the imperial period, depicting episodes from battles, the triumphal processions after military victories, and maps, which were depicted to highlight key points of the campaigns. According to him the illusionistic effect of the paintings was so effective that it actually deceived the public. Titus Flavius Josephus describes an example of a triumphal painting executed on the occasion of the sack of Jerusalem by Vespasian and Titus, saying that "even the fire being set on the temple was represented there, and houses falling on their owners.

=== Folk painting ===
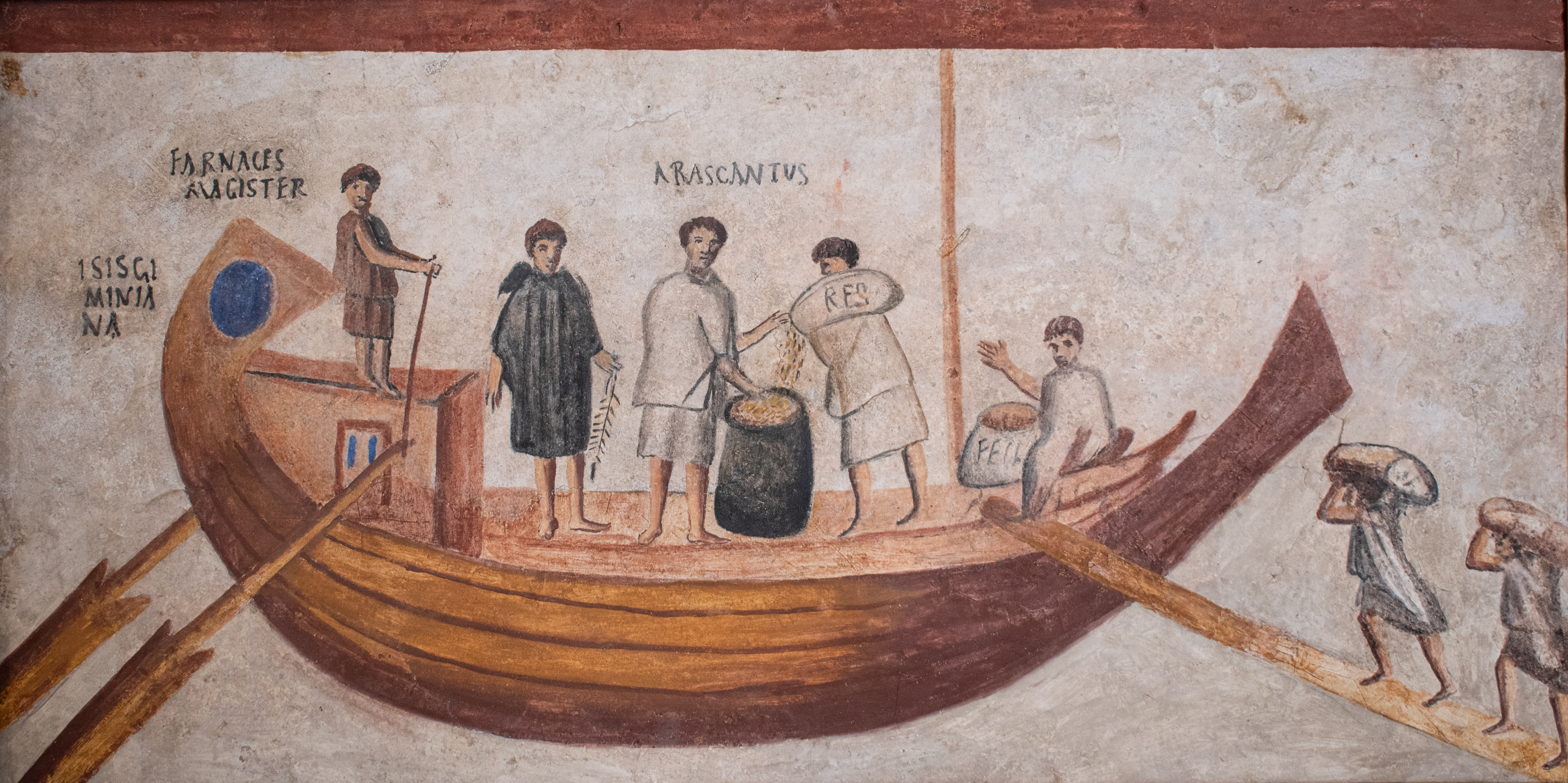
Folk painting of Ostia Antica

The description given of the four styles of painting informs about the development of the great tradition inherited from the Greeks and Hellenists, of a scholarly character, but especially in the Vesuvian area many examples have survived that must be studied in the context of popular culture. They mostly deal with local themes, with episodes from the real life of the population in their daily chores, others show processions, cult scenes, and images of gods, and others evidently functioned as advertisement panels for stores and workshops. This heterogeneous collection often presents crude features, and its internal unity is weak, but images endowed with charm and very interesting naive qualities are not rare, as well as being authentic expressions of the voice of the people. For this reason they are of great value for the understanding of Roman life as a whole.

== Materials and techniques ==
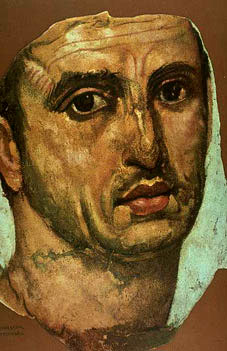
Portrait in encaustic, Egypt

The materials used by the Romans depended on the genre of the painting. The supports were wood, cloth (linen) and ivory for portable panels, and stone and stucco for mural painting. For Pliny, true painting was that made on wooden panels, and he regretted that this genre was falling into disuse in his time to meet the ostentatious fashion demands of the elites, who preferred the parietal frescoes. The pigments were generally obtained from minerals and plant and animal essences. However, we only have detailed information about the technique of mural painting left by Pliny and Vitruvius in their writings. Vitruvius wrote at length about the methods of wall preparation and mentioned that it was possible to obtain seven pure colors from pulverized minerals and nine compound colors, also of mineral origin, from a complex preparation process. The various shades of black were achieved by calcining resins, animal fats, bones or wood, and the famous and costly purple was a product of certain species of mollusks. Sky-blue was prepared by mixing certain metals and pulverized and calcined glass. Some procedures could be used to increase the brilliance or transparency of the colors after they had dried, such as applying mixtures of wax and oil, then polishing with cloths impregnated with candle ash for finishing.

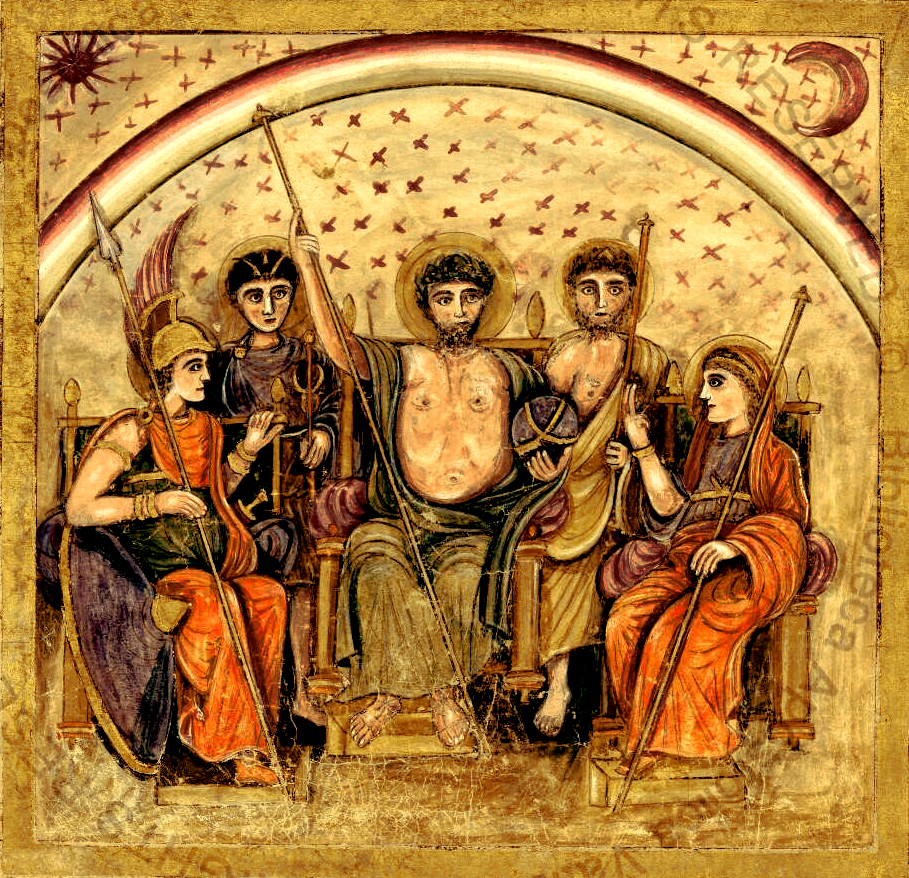
Assembly of the Gods, illumination in Roman Virgil (Vergilius Romanus)

If the artist used the true fresco technique, when pigment was applied directly to a fresh stucco base, the colors were limited by the chemical reaction of the materials with each other. Thus only four shades could be safely used – yellow, black, white and red, a pattern that had been enshrined by the Greeks – which were permanent, while other colors had uncertain durability. Even so, Vitruvius taught how to add extra colors after drying by painting encaustic over the frescoed base. Pliny, on the other hand, reported in detail several ways to obtain a wide range of gradations with just the four basic colors by using successive velatures with different shades. But there remain several aspects of the Roman wall-painting technique that have not yet been unraveled.

The other technique that can be studied more closely is encaustic, which could be applied on the wall or on wood. The best examples are the portraits on wood found in Egypt. Encaustic uses a wax medium to fix the pigment, and the artist must have great agility and assurance in his brush strokes, as he must work quickly while the wax is hot and fluid. The brush strokes therefore remain very visible and the colors bright, making it possible to create images of great sensitivity, poetry and vivacity.

Pliny also speaks of paintings on canvas, citing the example of a huge portrait of the emperor Nero that was 120 feet high (c. 36 m), which was destroyed by lightning, but gives no further details. He refers in many places to other portable works, but does not describe their technique. Finally, reference is made to the illustration of manuscripts, known as illuminated manuscript. This practice, which applied pigments (usually in the tempera technique) on parchment, was already widespread in late Hellenism. In Rome, examples are known from the 1st century, appearing in the book Hebdomades vel de imaginibus by Marcus Terentius Varro. Another is from the 5th or 6th century, in a copy of the Iliad, but its style suggests an inspiration from older sources. Two copies of 5th century works by Virgil survive with illustrations. With Christian text, the only known early example before the dissolution of the empire is the Quedlimburg Itala fragment, of which only a single fragment remains.

=== Composition, copying, and Invention ===
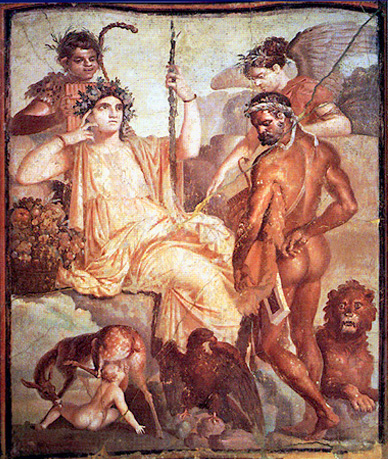
Hercules and Telephos. Basilica of Herculaneum

For the composition of wall paintings the Romans revealed the same eclectic inclination they displayed in other arts. From a large repertoire of figures and motifs left by the Greeks and Hellenists, they felt free to directly copy ready-made formal elements from various sources for the creation of a new composition, or alter them at will to satisfy the taste of their patrons, and this lends them an often unified character, which is especially visible during the Third and Fourth styles. Their overall style thus tends to be inconsistent and fragmentary, with an abundance of quotations from other authors and little concern for a powerful compositional unity. The painting Hercules and Thelephos, in the basilica at Herculaneum, is often cited as an example par excellence of this characteristic. One also finds several examples of scenes that obviously derive from the same model, but with significant variations between them, and with different areas receiving very different treatments. However, remember that this multifaceted aspect is a modern appreciation, and the Romans probably saw things differently.

In fact, they generally held a highly positive opinion of copying, and were proud of their role as emulators of a tradition they recognized as great. Much of aesthetic criticism up to the first Empire was, according to Clarke, engaged in discovering the best methods for good imitation of established models, a quest that had an ethical as well as an aesthetic foundation. Griffin says that mythological representations had a pedagogical and moralizing function above all, because "they were exemplary, because they illustrated and explained something of the order of the world and of the relations between men and the gods". Pliny said that the best painting was that which perfectly imitated nature, and should be as realistic and illusionistic as possible. Vitruvius, however, lamented that the imitation of nature was in his day being abandoned in favor of the fanciful. This may have been a conservative view, for other writers such as his contemporary Quintilian maintained that imitation by itself, though of great value, was not everything, and should be complemented, in a mature and creative artist, by personal reflection. Fantasy was indispensable as when, for example, portraying the gods, of whom there were no known authentic prototypes, there was no "real" object that could be imitated, and so recourse both to imagination and to the authors of antiquity, who set canonical types, was compulsory. Even with differing opinions, the aesthetic atmosphere as a whole throughout the Empire seems to have continued to place great importance on imitating the ancients for learning a formal vocabulary of time-tested efficiency understood by everyone in a vast region. Thus, composing a work in which knowledge of important authors was revealed in visual citations from various sources was a sign of the artist's erudition, and served to increase his fame.

== Late imperial painting and its posterity ==
After the destruction of Pompeii and Herculaneum in the late AD 1st century Roman decorative painting continued in a line that simply varied the plastic solutions of the late Fourth Style. By the time Hadrian reigned, who was born a few years before Vesuvius buried those two cities, it seems that a different art was already being practiced in the Ostia Antica region, acting as the vanguard of parameters that would later become widespread, although the scarcity of examples of late-imperial mural painting makes it risky to state anything with much certainty. Among the most striking features of the Ostian collection is an apparent disdain for the rigor of plumb and set square, which in earlier times had created convincing illusions of perspective and fairly exact architectures, to give way to free line drawing, quite outside of orthogonal coordinates. In any case, by the end of the second century the sense of solidity and the rationality of figurative architecture had dissolved. This led some modern critics to see in this phase a decline in quality, but the transformation may have simply mirrored changes in the aesthetic values of that time. There was also a tendency toward a lengthening and schematization of silhouettes, a use of more dramatic contrasts, and a partial return to abstract formulas reminiscent of the First Style. On the ceilings, the domed roof became popular, leading to the development of painting schemes based on diagonals or more complex geometries, with beautiful examples in the House of Painted Domes at Ostia, from the 3rd century. The collection of pictorial relics from the 2nd century onward, until the end of the 5th century, which marks the end of the Western Roman Empire, is quite sparse, but new images have appeared in various places in Europe in recent years as archaeological research has increased. One of the best surviving examples of late-imperial painting is not pagan, it belongs to a Hebrew context, and dates from the 3rd century, found in the synagogue of Dura-Europos, in the province of Syria, showing the earliest known depictions of Old Testament scenes.

But the major novelty in this phase is the development of a new religious iconography with the emergence of Christianity. Paleo-Christian paintings do not achieve a relevant visibility until after the second century. In the first place because at their beginning they were only grooves created by a small and generally uneducated group with scarce artistic resources, but also because early Christianity shared much of the Jewish aversion to image-making. Paulinus of Nola, a wealthy Christian of the third century, still had to justify himself for having images of living beings painted on the walls of the churches he had rebuilt, saying that,

Most of the crowd here cannot read. These people, long accustomed to profane cults, in which their womb was their God, are finally converted into proselytes of Christ as they admire the works of Christ's saints revealed (by the paintings) to everyone's eyes. See how so many gather from all parts and how they now gaze in wonder at the scenes with their pious but rude minds (...) Therefore, it seemed to us a useful work joyfully to embellish the houses of (St.) Felix with paintings on all sides ...

Moreover, at times this religion faced persecutions that prevented an artistic flourishing, and even when it was made official by the empire the most distinguished Christians still appreciated the classical culture and its formal models derived from paganism. For them it was relatively easy to reinterpret the ancient myths in the form of allegories, and to apply them to the new cult, and in this sense pagan representations were still acceptable as a means of spreading moralizing maxims and as a link with the pagans in the common belief in an afterlife. This association between Christianity and paganism was already visible in a veiled way in St. Paul's writings, where allusions to the majesty of Christ abound, and which were a clear transposition to a new context of the imperial apologies of Augustus' time. Not surprisingly, in the Paleochristian imagery Christ could be represented in the same way as Apollo, the sun god, illuminating the world, as Orpheus pacifying the "beasts" (pagans) with his "music" (doctrine), or as a classical philosopher teaching his disciples the secrets of the new philosophy. With the progressive rise of the prestige of Christianity, these elements acquired more weight in late-imperial Roman culture. The first examples of paleo-Christian painting are found in the catacombs, and the motifs are the same as in pagan decorations: garlands of flowers, animals, cupids, allegories, and human figures of ambiguous meaning. Some of them are clearer, showing people in prayer and the symbolic figures of the fish and the Good Shepherd. In the third century, scenes from the Gospels, the Old Testament and Christian legends appear, but their style and quality are very uneven. At the end of the third century, lightness and grace give way to a remodeling of the classical canons, and in the following century a different aesthetic is already outlined, heavier, schematic and with an abstracting tendency, which would lead to the formation of the Byzantine style, with Constantinople as its main center of irradiation. When Christianity received official support with the Edict of Milan in 313, a program of building many churches and basilicas began, whose internal decorations constitute the most important artistic achievement of the late Imperial period. Although their walls and domes were often covered with mosaics, a technique which quickly entered into the general taste for decoration of Christian temples, in others fresco was preferred, and since such temples were erected with the patronage of the elite, if not the imperial family itself, the level of quality far surpassed the primitive painting of the catacombs, and it is to be regretted that practically all such works disappeared in later reforms.

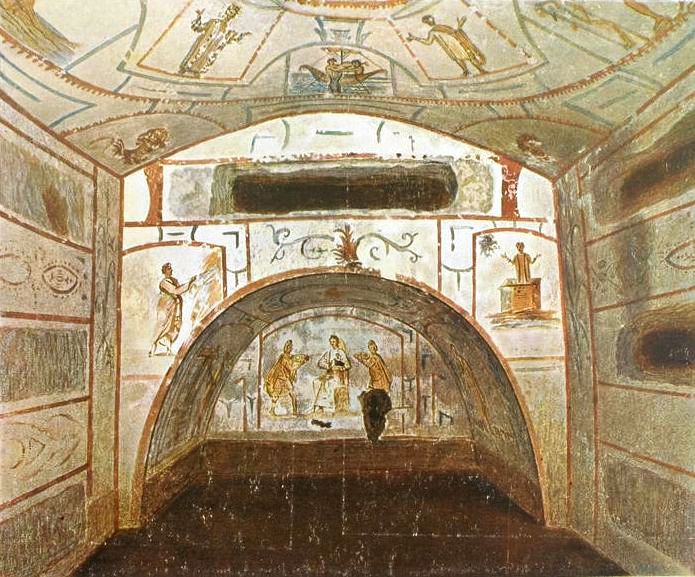
Catacombs of Marcellinus and Peter, Rome

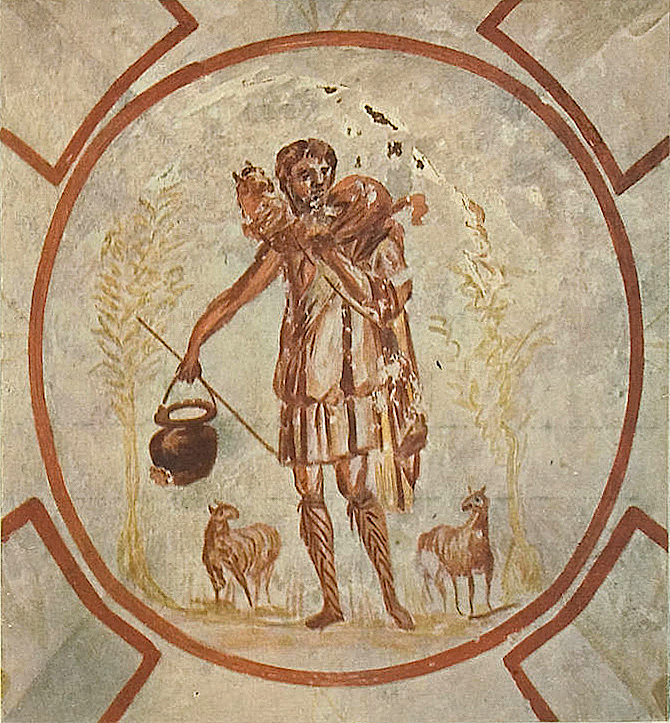
Jesus as the Good Shepherd, Catacomb of Callixtus, Rome

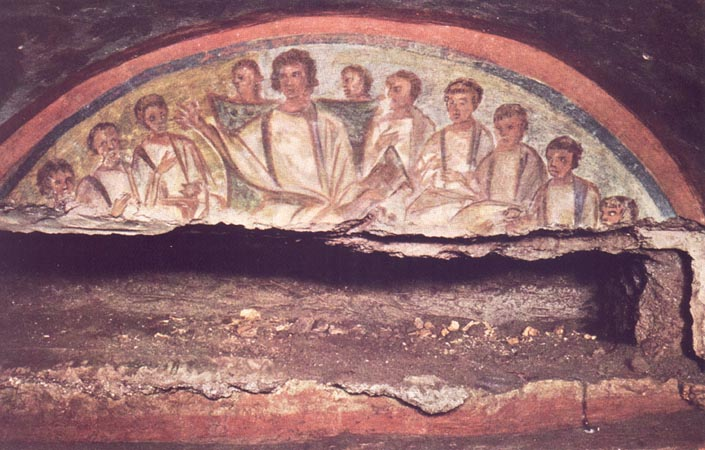
Christ teaching the Apostles, repeating pagan scenes of philosophers with their pupils, Catacombs of Domitilla, Rome

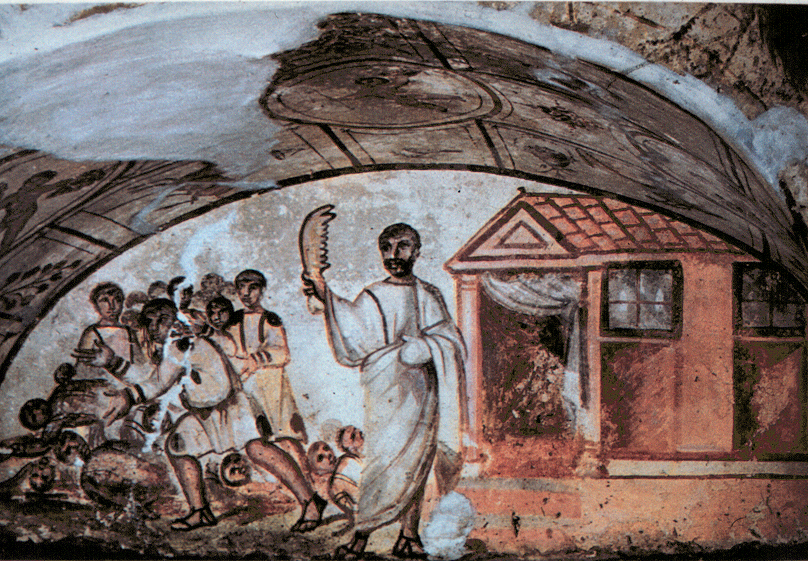
Samson Routing the Philistines, Catacombs of the Via Latina, Rome

=== Legacy ===
Late Roman Imperial painting was the formative basis of Byzantine painting, and its echoes remain alive to this day through the artistic traditions preserved by the Orthodox Church, while to the West it continued to provide inspiration for the elaboration of formal elements and decorative schemes of the early Middle Ages, notably in the Carolingian Renaissance. The painting of Ancient Rome continued to exert a not inconsiderable influence throughout the European Middle Ages, also influencing the Romanesque and Gothic styles. By this time the mural examples and portable paintings were virtually lost to the medieval, but many ancient mosaics could still be studied, which were transpositions of pictorial principles to another medium, and there was still a good collection of ancient manuscripts available, with accounts of the Roman arts, which continued to instigate the imagination of artists, especially when the occasional presence of illustrations in illuminated manuscripts gave immediate references. Its great importance in the Renaissance has been discussed before and need not be repeated, but it is worth mentioning finally that in the 18th century, with a renewal of interest in the culture of classical antiquity and new archaeological discoveries in the Vesuvius region, Roman painting came back into the spotlight. The excavated examples caused an important debate, especially in France – where the Rococo style dominated – about its austere and objective qualities, which were considered a remedy for the alleged defects of frivolity and sensuality of the prevailing school, becoming an important element in the constitution of neoclassical painting, whose pronounced historicism often bordered on archeological accuracy. Its influence lasted into the 19th century, and under a romantic atmosphere examples of Roman antiquity were still a source of inspiration for painters and decorators, and this vogue continued until the end of the century, when it coexisted with the first manifestations of the pre-modernist avant-garde.

Examples of Roman painting found outside Italy
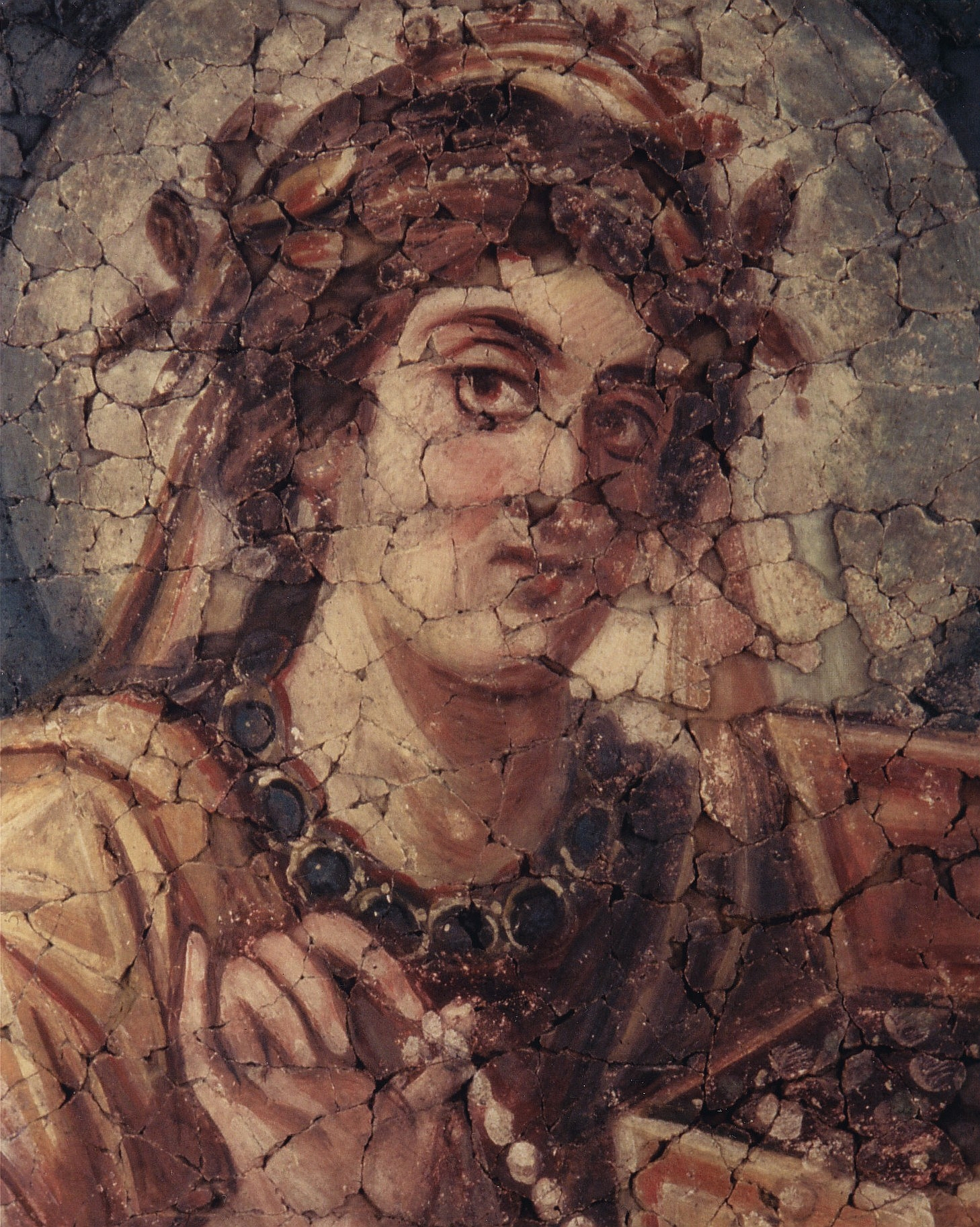
Treveri, Germany

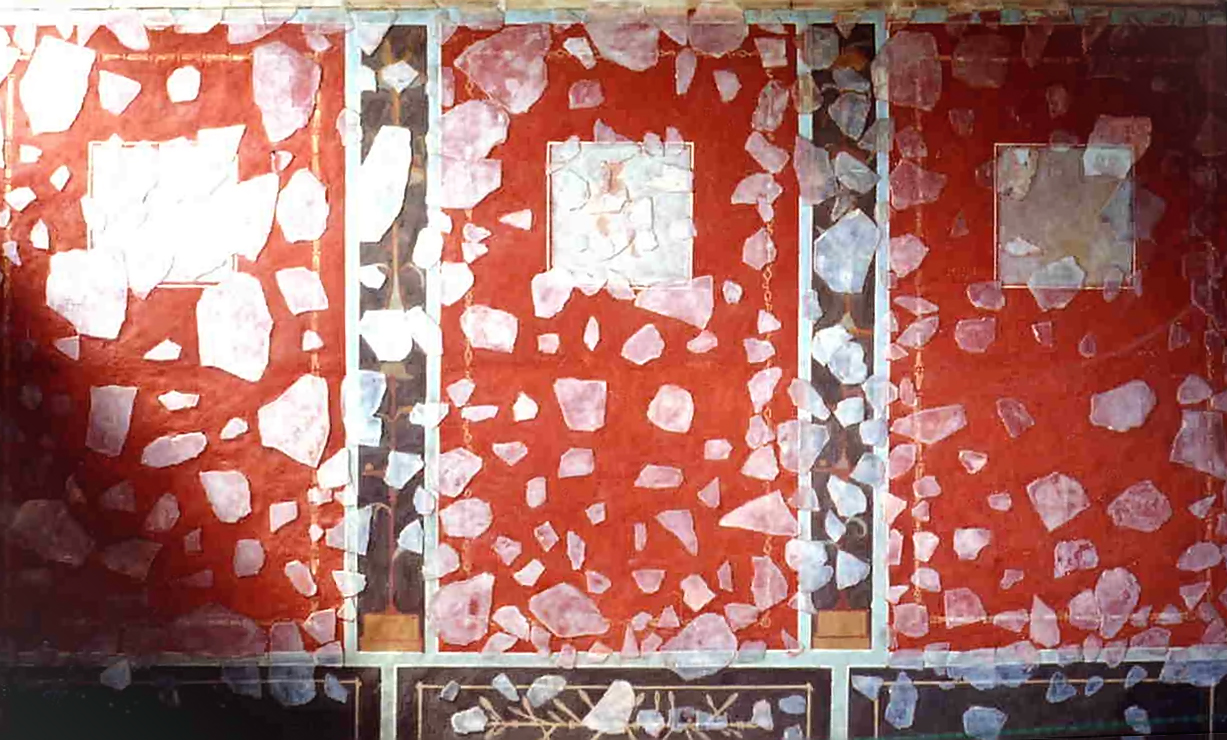
Budapest, Hungary

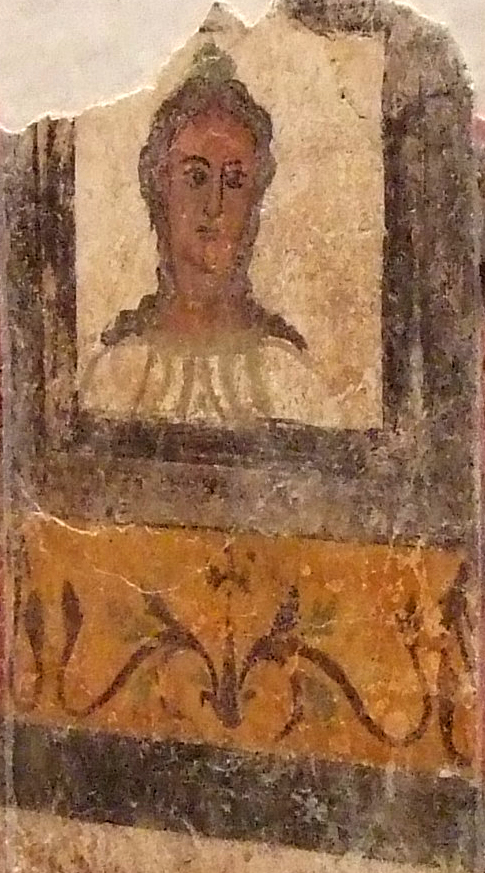
Zaragoza, Spain

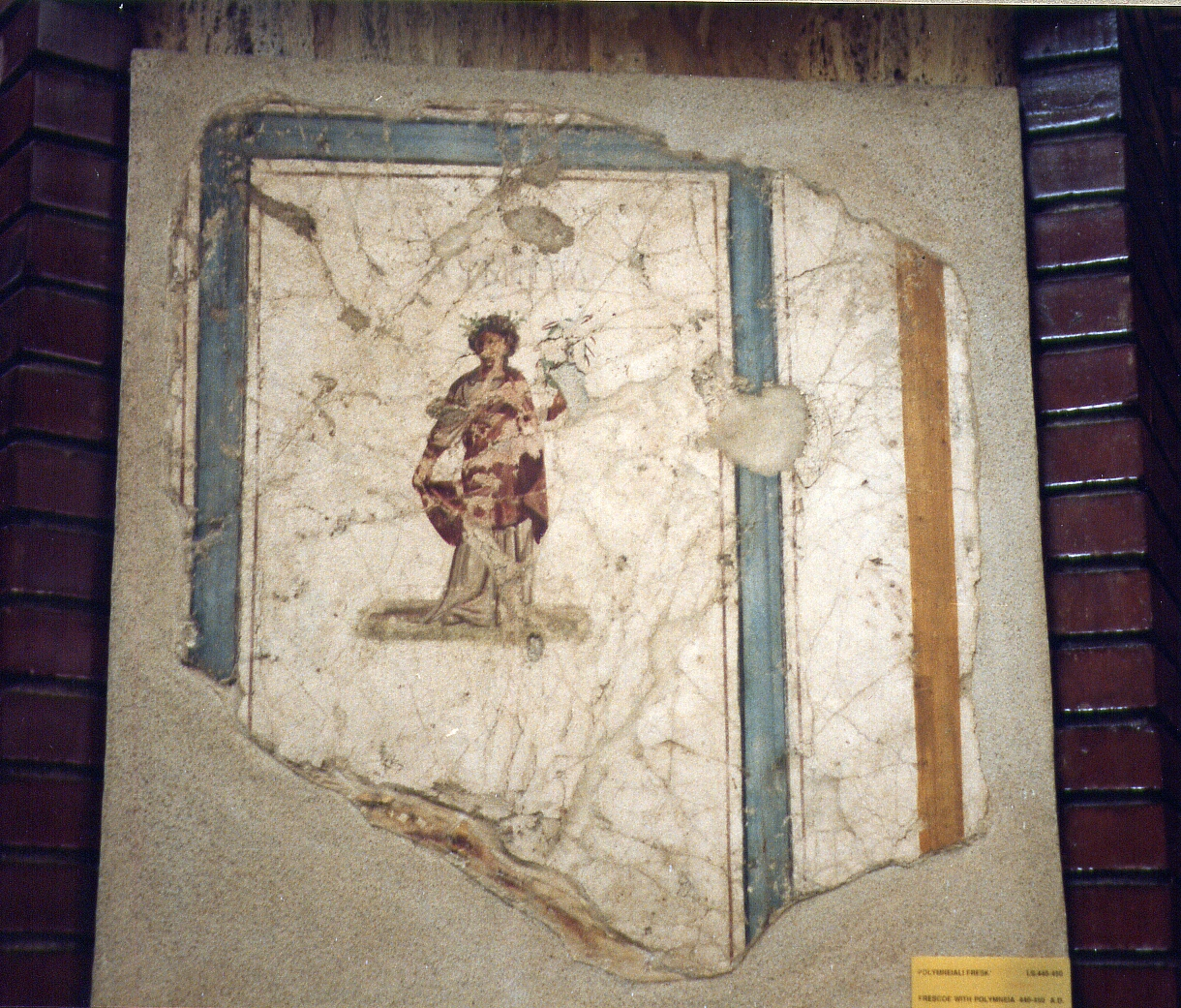
Ephesus, Turkey
Examples of Roman influence over the centuries
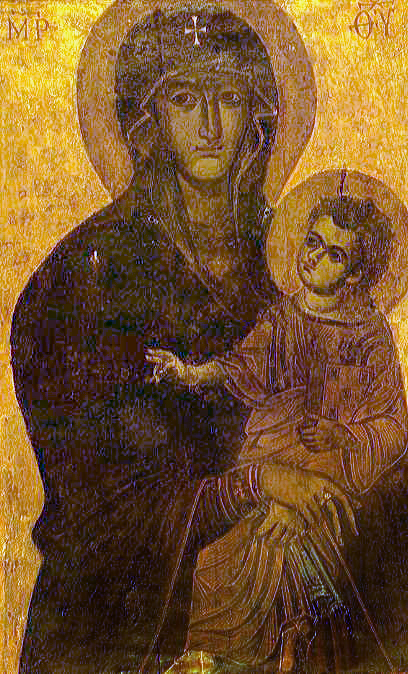
Salus Populi Romani, one of the oldest known Byzantine icons of the Virgin. Cf. note:

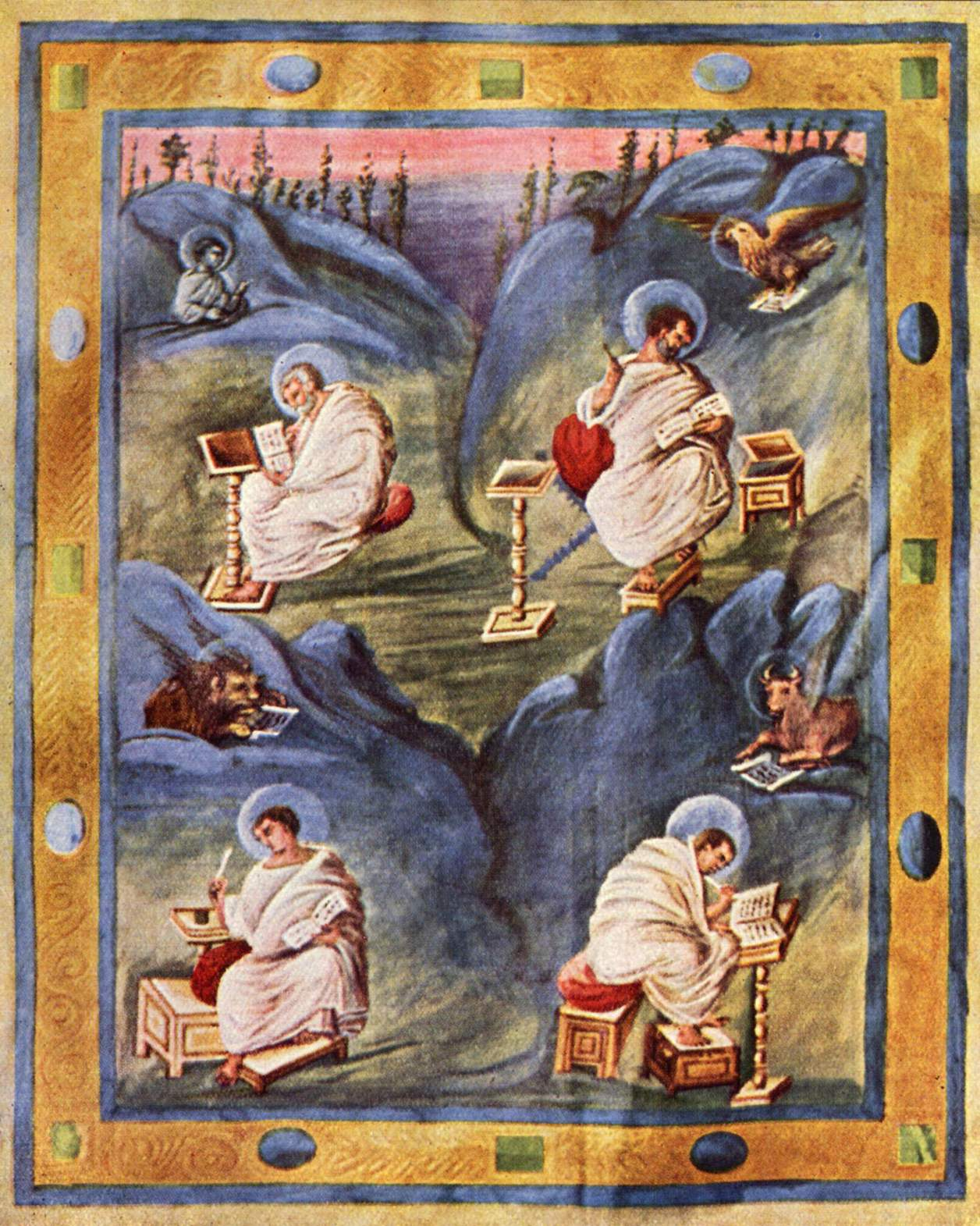
The Four Evangelists, Gospel of Aquisgrano, Carolingian Renaissance, 9th century

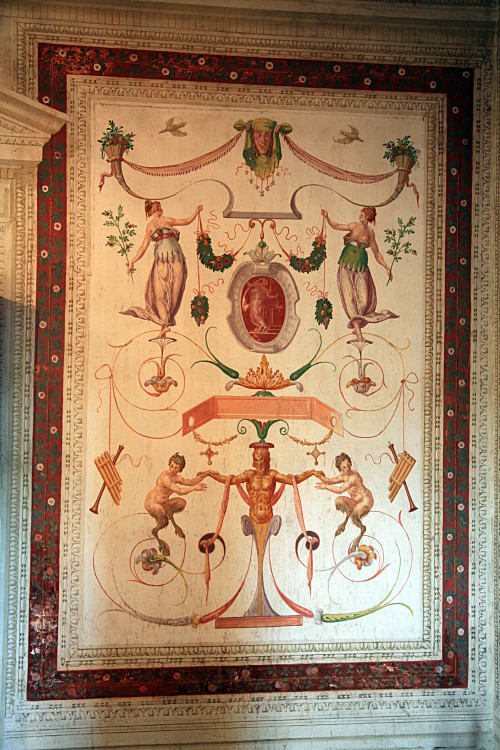
Grotesque at the Villa Emo, Renaissance, 16th century

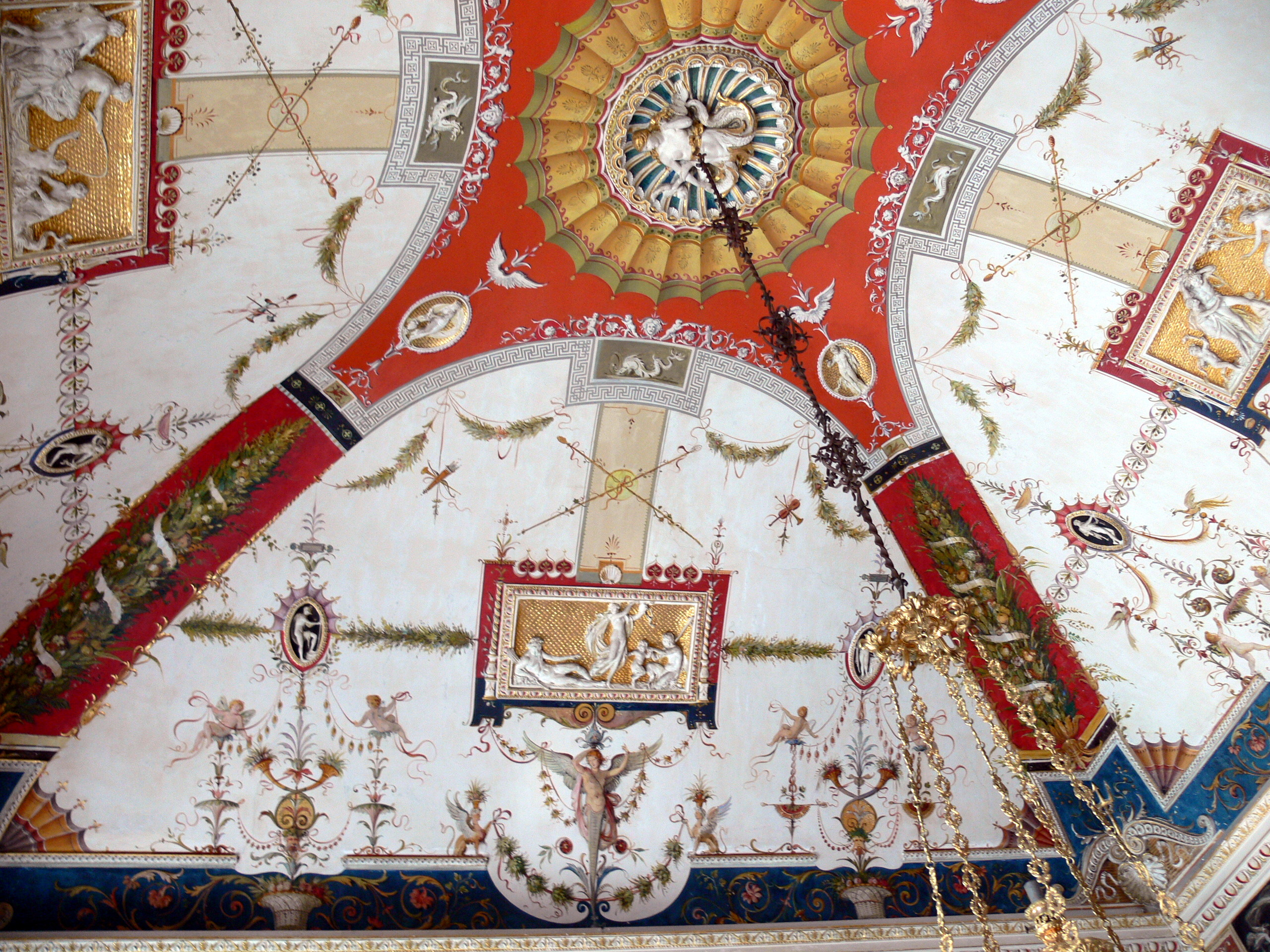
Grotesque ceiling at Villa Carlotta, late Romanticism, c. 1910
