= Attius Tullius =

5th-century BC politician and Volscian military leader

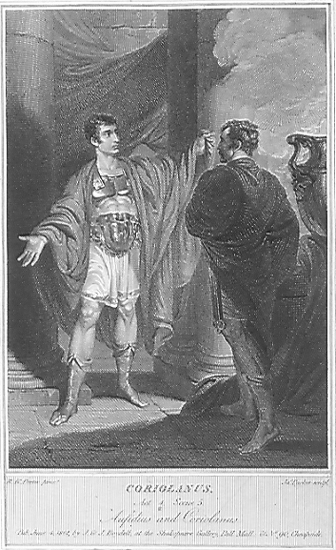
Act IV, Scene 5: Meeting of Coriolanus and Aufidius in William Shakespeare's tragedy Coriolanus

Attius Tullius was a well-respected and influential political and military leader of the Volsci in the early fifth century BC. According to Plutarch, who calls him Tullus Aufidius, his home town was Antium. Tullius sheltered the exiled Roman hero Gaius Marcius Coriolanus, then incited a war with Rome, in which he and Coriolanus led the Volscian forces. He appears in William Shakespeare's tragedy Coriolanus under the name of Tullus Aufidius.

== Background ==
The alliance between Tullius and Coriolanus had its roots in the first great confrontation between Rome's patrician and plebeian classes. In 494 BC, under the weight of crushing debt, the entire body of the plebeians seceded from Rome and took to the Mons Sacer. The patrician envoys negotiated a settlement to the dispute, first by agreeing to debt relief, and then by creating the new and sacrosanct office of the Tribune of the Plebs, in order to protect the interests of the plebeians.

The following year, Gaius Marcius, a young officer in the army of the consul Postumus Cominius, rescued the Roman forces attacking the Volscian town of Corioli from a desperate situation, in which they were simultaneously attacked by a Volscian relief force and a sortie from the town. Marcius led a company of soldiers through the gates of Corioli before they could be closed, and set fire to a number of buildings, effecting the capture of the undefended populace, and winning resounding fame, as well as the surname of Coriolanus.

Soon afterward, Rome was beset by famine, and a large quantity of grain was imported from Sicily. When the plebeians objected to the high price being charged, Coriolanus took a leading role in the patrician opposition to a reduction in price, demanding that if the people wished to have last year's price, they should agree to surrender their hard-won privileges and give up the tribunate. Notwithstanding his fame and heroic deeds, Coriolanus soon found himself the object of the people's scorn. Believing his life in danger, he fled into exile amongst the Volsci, the very people whom he had helped to defeat, where he was sheltered by the Volscian leader, Attius Tullius.

== War with Rome ==
Sensing weakness on the part of the Romans, and an opportunity for revenge, Tullius pretended reconciliation, and in 491 led a delegation of Volsci to Rome in order to participate in the celebration of the Great Games, which were being celebrated on a grand scale. In order to stir up Volscian resentment, he obtained a private audience with the consuls, and convinced them that he feared some discord might erupt between the Volscian youth and the Romans. The consuls put the matter before the senate, and the senate decided to expel the Volsci from Rome. The panicked Volsci gathered their belongings and hurriedly left the city. As surprise and fear turned to anger, Tullius met them at a grove sacred to the goddess Ferentina, further inflaming their passions, and inducing the Volsci to declare war on Rome.

Command of the Volscian forces was jointly entrusted to Tullius and Coriolanus, who led their army against Roman towns, colonies and allies. Roman colonists were expelled from Circeii. They then retook the formerly Volscian towns of Satricum, Longula, Pollusca and Corioli. Then the Volscian army took Lavinium, then Corbio, Vitellia, Trebia, Lavici and Pedum. At last, the Volsci were ready to besiege Rome itself. For this endeavour, the supreme command was entrusted to Coriolanus, rather than Tullius. He set up camp on the Cluilian trench, five miles outside Rome, and ravaged the countryside.

The Roman senate twice dispatched delegations to negotiate with the Volscian army, but Coriolanus refused to receive them. A delegation of priests in their ceremonial garments was likewise refused. At last a party of women appeared before the Volscian camp to plead for their city. Coriolanus was still of mind to refuse them, until one of his friends informed him that among the women were his mother, Veturia, his wife, Volumnia, and his two young sons. Moved by their pleas, Coriolanus agreed to withdraw his army and end the siege.

According to Fabius Pictor, Coriolanus endured a bitter exile for many years. According to Plutarch, on the other hand, the envious Tullius first demanded Coriolanus's resignation and then instigated his assassination by the Volsci before the trial was over.

== Afterward ==
On a subsequent occasion, Tullius arranged for an alliance between the Volsci and the Aequi, intending to renew hostilities upon Rome with a combined army. However, the Aequi refused to have Tullius in command of their forces, and a fierce battle between the would-be allies ensued, in which both armies were severely weakened, and Tullius was slain in battle against the Romans. This is the last occasion on which Tullius is mentioned, although Rome was frequently engaged in various skirmishes with both the Aequi and Volsci over the next several decades.

== Bibliography ==
- Titus Livius (Livy), History of Rome.
- Lucius Mestrius Plutarchus (Plutarch), Lives of the Noble Greeks and Romans (Parallel Lives).
- Thomas Arnold, The History of Rome, D. Appleton & Company, New York (1846).
- Dictionary of Greek and Roman Biography and Mythology, William Smith, ed., Little, Brown and Company, Boston (1849).
- Dictionary of Greek and Roman Geography, William Smith, ed., Little, Brown and Company, Boston (1854).
- Mrs. Hamilton Gray, History of Rome for Young Persons, T. Hatchard, London (1858).
- Henry G. Liddell, The Student's Rome: A History of Rome from the Earliest Times to the Establishment of the Empire, John Murray, London (1871).
- Wilhelm Ihne, The History of Rome, Longmans, Green, and Co., London (1895). s. v. "Attius Tullius" (1871); Early Rome: From the Foundation of the City to Its Destruction by the Gauls, Longmans, Green (1895).
- W.W. How, H.D. Leigh, A History of Rome to the Death of Cæsar, Longmans, Green, & Co., London (1898).
- Oxford Classical Dictionary, N. G. L. Hammond and H. H. Scullard, eds., Clarendon Press, Oxford (Second Edition, 1970).
