= 493 BC =

493 BC in various calendars
| Gregorian calendar | 493 BC; CDXCIII BC |
| Ab urbe condita | 261 |
| Ancient Egypt era | XXVII dynasty, 33 |
| Pharaoh | Darius I of Persia, 29 |
| Ancient Greek Olympiad (summer) | 71st Olympiad, year 4 |
| Assyrian calendar | 4258 |
| Balinese saka calendar | N/A |
| Bengali calendar | −1086 – −1085 |
| Berber calendar | 458 |
| Buddhist calendar | 52 |
| Burmese calendar | −1130 |
| Byzantine calendar | 5016–5017 |
| Chinese calendar | 丁未年 (Fire Goat); 2205 or 1998 — to — 戊申年 (Earth Monkey); 2206 or 1999 |
| Coptic calendar | −776 – −775 |
| Discordian calendar | 674 |
| Ethiopian calendar | −500 – −499 |
| Hebrew calendar | 3268–3269 |
- Hindu calendars
| Vikram Samvat | −436 – −435 |
| Shaka Samvat | N/A |
| Kali Yuga | 2608–2609 |
| Holocene calendar | 9508 |
| Iranian calendar | 1114 BP – 1113 BP |
| Islamic calendar | 1148 BH – 1147 BH |
| Javanese calendar | N/A |
| Julian calendar | N/A |
| Korean calendar | 1841 |
| Minguo calendar | 2404 before ROC 民前2404年 |
| Nanakshahi calendar | −1960 |
| Thai solar calendar | 50–51 |
| Tibetan calendar | མེ་མོ་ལུག་ལོ་ (female Fire-Sheep) −366 or −747 or −1519 — to — ས་ཕོ་སྤྲེ་ལོ་ (male Earth-Monkey) −365 or −746 or −1518 |

Year 493 BC was a year of the pre-Julian Roman calendar. At the time, it was known as the Year of the Consulship of Auruncus and Viscellinus (or, less frequently, year 261 Ab urbe condita). The denomination 493 BC for this year has been used since the early medieval period, when the Anno Domini calendar era became the prevalent method in Europe for naming years.

== Events ==
=== By place ===
==== Persian Empire ====
- A Phoenician-manned Persian fleet restores Persian control of Cyprus.

==== Greece ====
- The Athenian people elect Themistocles as archon, the chief judicial and civilian executive officer in Athens. He favours resistance against the Persians.
- Themistocles starts the construction of a fortified naval base at Piraeus, the port town of Athens.
- Among the refugees arriving from Ionia after the collapse of the Ionian Revolt is a chief named Miltiades, who has a fine reputation as a soldier. Themistocles makes him a general in the Athenian army.

==== Roman Republic ====
- The secession of the plebs concludes.
- The Roman army, led by Postumus Cominius Auruncus defeats the Volsci and the Romans capture the towns of Longula, Pollusca and Corioli. Gaius Marcius distinguishes himself in the battle for Corioli, and earns the cognomen Coriolanus.
- During his second consulate, the Roman consul Spurius Cassius Vecellinus concludes a treaty with the Latin League, the Foedus Cassianum, confirming Roman primacy in Latium.

=== By topic ===
==== Literature ====
- The Athenian poet Phrynicus produces a tragedy on the Fall of Miletus. The Athenian authorities ban the play from further production on the grounds of impiety.

== Deaths ==
- Agrippa Menenius Lanatus, former Roman consul.
- Cleisthenes
