= Roman–Volscian wars =

Series of wars fought between Roman Republic and Volsci

Roman-Volscian wars
- Part of the Roman expansion in Italy
Date	6th century BC – 4th century BC
Location	Latium
Result	Roman victory

Belligerents
Roman Republic	Volsci

The Roman–Volscian wars were a series of wars fought between the Roman Republic and the Volsci, an ancient Italic people. Volscian migration into southern Latium led to conflict with that region's old inhabitants, the Latins under leadership of Rome, the region's dominant city-state. By the late 5th century BC, the Volsci were increasingly on the defensive and by the end of the Samnite Wars had been incorporated into the Roman Republic. The ancient historians devoted considerable space to Volscian wars in their accounts of the early Roman Republic, but the historical accuracy of much of this material has been questioned by modern historians.

== Early conflict ==
According to Rome's early semi-legendary history, Rome's seventh and last king Lucius Tarquinius Superbus was the first to go to war against the Volsci, commencing two centuries of a relationship of conflict between the two states. Tarquinius took the wealthy town of Suessa Pometia, the spoils of which he used to construct the great Temple of Jupiter Optimus Maximus. He celebrated a triumph for his victory.

== Volscian aggression ==
During the 5th century BC the Volsci and the Aequi, a related people, invaded Latium, as part of a larger pattern of Sabellian-speaking peoples migrating out of the Apennines and into the plains. Several peripheral Latin communities appear to have been overrun. In response the Latins formed the Foedus Cassianum, a mutual military alliance between the Latin cities with Rome as the leading partner. The ancient sources record fighting against either the Aequi, the Volsci, or both almost every year during the first half of the 5th century BC. Famously the Roman nobleman Gnaeus Marcius Coriolanus is supposed to have gone over to the Volsci after being spurned by his countrymen. This annual warfare would have been dominated by raids and counter-raids rather than the pitched battles described by the ancient sources.

=== Volscian invasion in 495 BC ===
According to Livy, in around 496 BC before the Romans defeated the Latins at the Battle of Lake Regillus, the Volsci raised troops to assist the Latins. Because of the Roman dictator's speedy march, the Volsci forces did not arrive in time to participate in the battle. However, the Romans learnt of the Volscian activities and in 495 BC the consul Publius Servilius Priscus Structus marched into Volscian territory. The Volsci were alarmed, and gave three hundred children of the leading men of Cora and Suessa Pometia as hostages. The Roman army withdrew.

Shortly afterwards, however, the Volsci formed an alliance with the Hernici and sent ambassadors to seek the aid of the Latins. The Latins, having been defeated by Rome the previous year, were so outraged by the Volsci attempts to lure them into another war, that they seized the Volscian ambassadors, delivered them to the consuls in Rome, and advised them that the Volsci together with the Hernici were fomenting war. The Roman Senate, so thankful at the assistance of the Latins, returned 6,000 prisoners to the Latin towns and in return the Latins sent a crown of gold to the Temple of Jupiter Optimus Maximus in Rome. A great crowd formed, including the freed Latin prisoners, who thanked their captors. Great bonds of friendship were said to have arisen between the Romans and the Latins as a result of this event.

Some time later in 495 BC, a group of Latin horsemen rode to Rome to warn that a Volscian army was approaching the city. Discord between the Roman plebs (who were angry at levels of debt being suffered by them) and the patrician senators was quickly avoided. The plebs refused to enroll to fight against the Volsci on account of their grievances. The senate dispatched the consul Servilius to deal with the issue. Servilius assembled the people, and placated them initially with decrees relieving some of the more severe hardships of debt, and also with promises of further consideration of the problems of debt after the war. The people, placated, gathered to swear the military oath and soon afterwards Servilius led the Roman army from the city and pitched camp a short distance from the enemy.

The Volsci attacked the Roman camp the following night, hoping to benefit from the dissent amongst the Romans. Instead the Roman army took up arms and repulsed the attack. The next day the Volsci attacked the Roman fortifications again, filling the trenches and attacking the rampart. The consul held back the Roman troops at first, allowing the Volsci to destroy a large part of the fortifications surrounding the camp. Then he gave the order to attack and the Volsci were routed at the first engagement. The Roman army pursued the Volscian army to its own camp, and the camp was surrounded then taken and plundered following the flight of the Volsci. The Roman force followed the Volscian army to Suessa Pometia, and took and plundered that town. The Romans then returned to Rome in glory. Ambassadors from the Volscian town of Ecetra then arrived in Rome, and the senate agreed to grant them peace on condition that their land be given to Rome.

=== Engagement in 494 BC ===
During the period of popular discontent in Rome which led to the First secessio plebis in 494 BC, each of the Volsci, Sabines and the Aequi took up arms at the same time. To meet the threat, a Roman dictator was appointed, Manius Valerius Maximus. Ten legions were raised, a greater number than had been raised previously at any one time, three of which were assigned to the consul Verginius to deal with the Volsci.

Verginius advanced with the Roman army and ravaged the Volscian territory in order to provoke the Volsci into battle. The two armies made camp near each other, then formed battle lines on the plain which lay between the camps. The Volscians, who were considerably superior in number, charged the Roman line. The Roman consul ordered his troops to stand firm, and to neither advance nor return the enemy's battle cries. Indeed, the Romans were directed to leave their spears fixed in the ground, but to draw their swords and lay into the Volscian troops when they met the Roman line. The Volsci, wearied from their charge, were overcome by the Roman resistance and fell back in disorder. The Roman army pursued and took the Volscian camp, and from there went on to capture the Volscian town of Velitrae where they slaughtered many of the remaining Volscian troops, except for a small number who were offered quarter and surrendered.

The territory surrounding Velitrae was seized, and a Roman colony planted in the town.

=== Roman reprisals in 493 BC ===
In 493 BC the Roman army, led by the consul Postumus Cominius Auruncus fought and defeated a force of the Volsci from the coastal town of Antium. The Roman army pursued the Volsci to the town of Longula (to the north of Antium). The Romans took Longula, and then pursuing the Volsci further north, also took the town of Pollusca and followed the Volsci to the town of Corioli.

The Roman army laid siege to Corioli. However, whilst the Romans were focused on the siege, another Volscian force arrived from Antium and attacked the Romans, and at the same time the soldiers of Corioli launched a sally. A young noble Roman, Gaius Marcius held watch at the time of the Volscian attack. He quickly gathered a small force of Roman soldiers to fight against the Volscians who had sallied forth from Corioli. Not only did he repel the enemy, but he charged through the town gates and then began setting fire to some of the houses bordering the town wall. The citizens of Corioli cried out, and the whole Volscian force was dispirited and was defeated by the Romans. The town was captured, and Marcius gained the cognomen Coriolanus.

=== Hostilities averted in 492 BC ===
In 492 BC Rome was beset by a famine. The consuls sought to buy grain amongst the neighbouring peoples. Amongst the Volsci the grain merchants were threatened with violence if grain was sold to the Romans.

Livy reports that the Volsci were preparing to attack Rome. However a pestilence spread amongst the Volsci and war was averted. The Romans took steps to protect their position. Additional Roman colonists were sent to the town of Velitrae, and a new Roman colony was established at Norba.

=== Volscian invasion led by Coriolanus in 491–488 BC ===
In 491 BC Coriolanus, who had been prominent in the siege of the Volscian town of Corioli in 493 BC, was exiled from Rome because he had advocated the reversal of the pro-plebeian political reforms arising from the First secessio plebis in 494 BC. Coriolanus fled to Rome's enemies, the Volsci and resided with the Volscian leader Attius Tullius.

Meanwhile, the Great Games were being celebrated in Rome on a grand scale, and a number of the Volsci had travelled to Rome to participate in the celebrations. Aufidius sought to devise a way to stir up Volscian ill-will against Rome. He obtained a private audience with the consuls, and convinced them that he feared some discord might erupt between the Volscian youth and the Romans. The consuls put the matter before the senate, and the senate decided to expel the Volsci from Rome.

Aufidius met the fleeing Volscians outside Rome in a grove sacred to the goddess Ferentina and stirred up their feelings against Rome, and thereby caused the Volsci to declare war against Rome.

Coriolanus and Aufidius led the Volscian army against Roman towns, colonies and allies. Roman colonists were expelled from Circeii. They then retook the formerly Volscian towns of Satricum, Longula, Pollusca and Corioli. Then the Volscian army took Lavinium, then Corbio, Vitellia, Trebia, Lavici and Pedum.

From there the Volsci marched on Rome and besieged it. The Volscians initially camped at the Cluilian trench, five miles outside Rome, and ravaged the countryside. Coriolanus directed the Volsci to target plebeian properties and to spare the patricians'.

The consuls, now Spurius Nautius Rutilus and Sextus Furius, readied the defences of the city. But the plebeians implored them to sue for peace. The senate was convened, and it was agreed to send supplicants to the enemy. Initially ambassadors were sent, but Coriolanus sent back a negative response. The ambassadors were sent to the Volsci a second time, but were refused entry to the enemy camp. Next priests, in their regalia, were sent by the Romans, but achieved nothing more than had the ambassadors.

Then Coriolanus' mother Veturia and his wife Volumnia and his two sons, together with the matrons of Rome, went out to the Volscian camp and implored Coriolanus to cease his attack on Rome. Coriolanus was overcome by their pleas, and moved the Volscian camp back from the city, ending the siege. Rome honoured the service of these women by the erection of a temple dedicated to Fortuna (a female deity).

Coriolanus' fate after this point is unclear, but it seems he took no further part in the war.

The Volscian army subsequently returned to Roman territory to attack the city. They were joined by the Aequi. However a dispute broke out as the Aequi would not accept Aufidius as their leader, and the Volsci and Aequi fought a furious battle in which the strength of each was seriously diminished.

=== Ongoing hostilities from 487 BC ===
One of the consuls in the following year (487 BC), Titus Sicinius Sabinus, was allocated responsibility for continuing the war with the Volsci. The outcome of the hostilities at that time is unclear, although it seems the Romans fared better.

The Volsci and the Aequi were together defeated again in 485 BC. The consul Quintus Fabius Vibulanus incurred the anger of the plebs by lodging the spoils of victory with the publicum.

Again in 484 BC hostilities with the Volsci and Aequi were renewed. The Romans led by the consul Lucius Aemilius Mamercus defeated the enemy, and the Roman cavalry slaughtered many in the rout which followed.

In 483 BC Livy says that the Volsci renewed hostilities, but gives little detail except to say that the Romans paid little attention to the issue, as their own strength was more than sufficient, and they were distracted by internal matters.

In 475 BC the Volsci together with the Aequi invaded the Latin territory. The Latins, joined by the Hernici but without the assistance of any Roman troops or Roman commander, repelled the enemy and captured a significant amount of booty. The Roman consul Gaius Nautius Rutilus was then sent against the Volsci and the Volscian territory was ravaged, but there was no significant engagement between the opposing forces.

=== Volscian attacks between 471 BC and 468 BC ===
The Volsci invaded Roman territory in 471 BC, and again from 469 to 468 BC, during a time of social upheaval in Rome.

In 471 BC Appius Claudius, hated by the people in Rome, was consul. He unsuccessfully opposed popular legislation proposed by the tribune Volero Publilius, thereby inflaming the populace.

At the same time the Volsci, hoping to take advantage of the internal conflict at Rome, laid waste to Roman territory. The war against them was allotted to Claudius. Stung by his defeat at the hands of the tribunes, the consul was determined to subject his army to the harshest discipline. But his disrespect for the plebeians was so notorious that his soldiers were openly insubordinate and disobedient. They refused to attack the enemy, instead retreating to their camp, and only turning against the Volscian forces when they were attacked themselves. His officers dissuaded Appius from taking immediate action against the soldiers, but the army was attacked again and fell into disarray as it left the camp.

After reaching the safety of Roman territory, Appius gathered the remnants of his army, and ordered that all of the soldiers who had lost their equipment or standards, and all of the officers who had deserted their posts should be flogged and beheaded. He then punished the remainder of the army with decimation, the earliest instance of this particular punishment occurring in Roman history.

In 469 BC, at a time when riots seemed imminent in Rome due to popular unrest, the Volsci again invaded Roman territory and began burning Roman country estates. The consul Titus Numicius Priscus was given responsibility for leading an army against the Volsci. The Volscian forces left the Roman territory, but Numicius pursued them, defeated the Volscian army in an initial engagement, then when the Volscian forces took shelter in Antium, Numicius captured the neighbouring port town of Caenon; that small town was definitively destroyed.

Hostilities continued in the following year. The consul Titus Quinctius Capitolinus Barbatus led the Roman army. In an initial engagement, the Romans were almost defeated, but Quinctius lifted their spirits by telling each wing of the army that the other was having great success. Thus re-animated, the Romans won the day. A period of rest followed, as both sides re-grouped. Then the Volsci launched a night attack on the Roman camp. But the consul kept the enemy at bay with a cohort of the allied Hernici, together with mounted trumpeters (the cornicines and tubicines) to make the enemy think the Romans were about to make a counter-attack. This kept the enemy on edge during the night, and allowed the Romans a good sleep. The Romans thus refreshed, at daylight the consul led the Romans against the Volsci. The Volsci took a position on higher ground. The consul hesitated to attack uphill, but the Roman troops convinced him to give the order for attack. The Romans left their spears fixed in the ground to lessen the burden. In the major battle which followed, the Romans were victorious. Quinctius then led the Romans to besiege Antium, and the town surrendered shortly afterward. A Latin colony was planted in the town in the following year, representing a major defeat for the Volsci. Quinctius celebrated a triumph for his victory.

== Growth of Roman power ==
During the second half the 5th century BC the Romans and the Latins appear to have stemmed the tide of Volscian aggression. The sources record the founding of several Roman colonies during this era, while mention of wars against the Aequi and Volsci become less frequent.

=== The Battle ad Maecium 389 BC ===
In 390 BC, a Gaulish warband first defeated the Roman army at the Battle of Allia and then sacked Rome. The ancient writers report that in the following year, the Etruscans, the Volsci and the Aequi all raised armies in hope of exploiting this blow to Roman power while the Latins and Hernici abandoned their alliance with Rome.

==== Ancient narratives ====
Livy, Plutarch and Diodorus Siculus provide roughly similar narratives of the ensuing Roman campaign against the Volsci, with Plutarch's account being the most detailed. According to Plutarch and Diodorus Siculus the Roman consular tribunes marched out with the army and pitched camp near Mount Marcius, but their camp was attacked by the Volsci.

To deal with their many enemies the Romans now appointed Marcus Furius Camillus dictator. According to Plutarch, Camillus raised a new army, which included men normally considered too old for military service, eluded the Volsci by marching around Mount Marcius and arrived in the enemy's rear where he made his presence known by lighting fires. The besieged Romans prepared to sally out. Rather than risk being attacked from two sides, the Volsci retreated into their own camp and barricaded themselves inside. Knowing that a strong wind would blow down from the mountains at sunrise, Camillus ordered part of his forces to make a diversionary attack on the opposite side, while he led the rest of the army to hurl fire into the enemy camp once the sun rose. Aided by the wind, the fires burnt the camp to the ground. Most of the enemy perished, either in the fire or by desperate attacks on the Roman army.

According to Diodorus Siculus, Camillus marched out at night. At dawn he attacked the Volsci in the rear while they were attacking the camp. Those in the camp sallied forth. Attacked from two sides the Volscians were slaughtered. According to Livy, who does not mention the consular tribunes' initial difficulties, the news of Camillus' appointment to command was enough to cause the Volsci to barricade themselves in their camp at ad Maecium near Lanuvium. Camillus set fire to the barricades, throwing the Volscian army into such confusion so that when the Romans assaulted the camp, they had little problem routing the Volsci. Camillus then ravaged their territory until the Volsci were forced to surrender.

The ancient sources then tell how Camillus won great victories first against the Aequi and then against the Etruscans at Sutrium. Livy also provides a description of the amount of spoils taken. Having won three simultaneous wars, Camillus returned to Rome in triumph. The many prisoners taken in the Etruscan war were publicly sold; after the gold owed to Rome's matrons had been repaid (they had contributed their gold to ransom Rome from the Gauls), enough was left for three golden bowls inscribed with the name of Camillus and placed in the Temple of Jupiter Optimus Maximus before the feet of the statue of Juno.

==== Modern interpretations ====
The many similarities between accounts of the campaigns of 389 and 386 BC (for which see below) - in both Camillus is placed in command, defeats the Volsci and comes to the aid of Sutrium - has caused several modern authors to consider these to be doublets of each other. This was the view taken by Beloch who held that the Gallic sack had a severe and long-lasting effect on Rome's fortunes. Accordingly, Camillus' stunning victories against the Etruscans and Volsci so soon after must be inventions designed to minimize the scale of the Roman defeat. Different later writers then treated these invented victories in different ways, assigning them to different years with different incidental detail, until in Livy's writings they emerge as separate, but ultimately both unhistorical, events.

Cornell (1995) believes the Gallic sack to have been a setback to Rome from which she rapidly recovered, and sees the Roman victories that followed as continuation of an aggressive expansionist policy begun three decades earlier. The accounts of these victories have been exaggerated and elaborated, and some events duplicated, but essentially describe historical events that fit into the broader picture of Rome's development. While the role of Camillus has been exaggerated, the frequency in which he is recorded to have held office attest to his political importance in Rome during this era.

Oakley (1997) considers the accounts of a Roman victory against the Volsci in 389 BC to be historical. All three surviving sources probably derived their accounts of this battle from a common tradition, the discrepancies being due to different authors omitting different details. This hypothesis is strengthened by Livy and Plutarch's very similar accounts of the fighting at Sutrium later the same year. However the original historical records probably just stated that the Romans won against the Volsci in a battle fought ad Maecium, all other details being later inventions. Except for the repayment of the gold to the matrons, Livy's description of Camillus' triumph that year could be based on authentic information; if so this would help confirm the fighting happened. The victory that year against the Volsci opened the Pomptine region for further Roman inroads.

Forsythe (2005) takes a more sceptical view. He believes only the existence of three golden bowls dedicated by Camillus to Juno to be historical. From these ancient writers have invented a series of lightning victories against the traditional enemies of Rome at the time of Camillus—viz., the Etruscans, the Aequi and the Volsci—and dated them to the year after the Gallic sack when Rome was supposed to be beset by enemies on all sides.

=== Roman designs for the Pontine region 388–385 BC ===
Until the development of Latina in modern times, south-eastern Latium was covered by the Pontine Marshes. Between these marshes and the Monti Lepini there was an area of dry land, the ager Pontinus. The Pontine region is the scene of much of the recorded fighting between Romans and Volsci during the 380s and 370s BC.

==== Ancient narratives ====
Livy is our only source for the next few years. According to him, in 388 the Roman tribunes of the plebs proposed to divide up the Pontine territory, but met little support from the plebs. In 387 BC Lucius Sicinius, tribune of the plebs, again raised the question of the Pomptine territory. However, when news reached Rome that Etruria was in arms the subject was dropped. The Antiates invaded the Pomptine territory the following year and it was reported in Rome that the Latins had sent warriors to assist them. The Romans had elected Camillus as one of the year's six consular tribunes in anticipation of an Etruscan war. He now took charge of affairs almost as if he had been elected dictator. He chose one of the other consular tribunes, Publius Valerius Potitus Poplicola, as his colleague in the Volscan war, tasking the other four with defending and governing the city.

Camillus and Valerius met the Antiates at Satricum. In addition to Volsci, the Antiates had brought a large number of Latins and Hernici to the field. At first daunted by the size and composition of the enemy army, after a rousing speech by Camillus the Roman soldiers charged the enemy. It was claimed that to further incite his men, Camillus ordered the army standard flung into the enemy's lines. The Volsci were routed and slaughtered in great number during their flight until a rainstorm brought an end to the fighting. The Latins and Hernici now abandoned the Volsci who took refuge inside Satricum. Camillus first began a regular investment, but when sorties disrupted the construction of his siege works, he changed tactics and carried the city by storm. Leaving Valerius in command of the army, Camillus returned to Rome to urge the senate to continue the war and attack Antium, the Volscian capital. However upon news that the Etruscans were attacking the border strongholds of Nepete and Sutrium, it was instead decided that Camillus and Valerius should take on the Etruscans with a new army raised at Rome. Consular tribunes Lucius Quinctius Cincinnatus and Lucius Horatius Pulvillus were sent to carry on the Volscian war Livy then describe how Camillus again defeated the Etruscans at Sutrium and Nepete.

In 385 BC, Aulus Cornelius Cossus was nominated Dictator with Titus Quinctius Capitolinus as Master of the Horse, ostensibly to deal with the Volscian war and the defection of the Latins and Hernici, but the true reason was the trouble stirred up by Marcus Manlius Capitolinus. The Dictator marched his army into the Pomptine territory which he had heard was being invaded by the Volsci. The Volscian army was swelled by Latins and Hernici, and included contingents from the Roman colonies of Circeii and Velitrae. Preparing for battle on the morrow after his arrival, Cornelius ordered his soldiers to receive the enemy's charge. The Romans stood firm and when, as planned, the cavalry under Titus Quinctius attacked, panic broke out among the enemy. The Volsci fled the field and their camp was taken. Cornelius bestowed all the plunder, except the prisoners, on the soldiers. Returning to Rome, Aulus Cornelius celebrated his triumph over the Volsci. Satricum was colonized with 2000 Roman citizens, each to receive two and a half jugera of land.

According to Diodorus, in the Varronian year 386 BC, the Romans sent 500 colonists to Sardinia. This could also be a reference to the colonization of Satricum, the name having been corrupted by Diodorus or his copyist.

==== Modern interpretations ====
Beloch rejected Camillus' campaign of 386 as a doublet of that of 389 (itself invented) and also the events of 385 as they depended on Camillus' victory at Satricum the previous year. More recently, Cornell (1995), Oakley (1997) and Forsythe (2005) have instead chosen to interpret these events as part of an expansionist Roman policy to take control of the Pomptine region. Hence the fighting takes place at Satricum and Antium rather than on Roman territory.

Indebtedness was a persistent problem at Rome in this era. The favoured method of debt-relief, land allotments, provided a motivation for Roman expansion into the Pomptine region. The sources however mention many proposals for agrarian laws to divide up public land, some of which might be unhistorical. The Sicinii feature prominently as plebeian leaders in the Struggle of the Orders, but it's questionable how much of this has any historical basis. The plebeian tribune of 388, L. Sicinius, is otherwise unknown and could be an invention.

Circeii and Velitrae had been colonized by Rome and the Latins in 393 and 401 respectively, but these might have been little more than garrisons. By 385 the native Volsci could have seized control of these towns again, but it is also possible that the Roman and Latin settlers had now turned against Rome. These two settlements more than any other Latin towns would have felt vulnerable to Rome's aggressive designs for the Pomptine region.

=== The Volsci join forces with the Latins 383–381 ===
==== Ancient narratives ====
Livy records that in 383 Lanuvium, a Latin town which had so far been loyal to Rome, rebelled and joined the Volsci and the colonies of Circeii and Velitrae in the war against Rome. In Rome, on the advice of the senate, the tribes unanimously declared war on Velitrae after five commissioners had been appointed to distribute the Pomptine territory and three to settle a colony at Nepete. However, there was pestilence in Rome throughout the year and no campaign was launched. Among the revolting colonists a peace party was in favour of asking Rome for pardon, but the war party continued hold the population's favour and a raid was launched into Roman territory effectively ending all talk of peace. In 382 consular tribunes Spurius and Lucius Papirius marched against Velitrae, their four colleagues being left to defend Rome. The Romans defeated the Veliternian army, which included a large number of Praenestine auxiliaries, but refrained from storming the place, doubting whether a storm would be successful and not wanting to destroy the colony. Based on the report of the tribunes, Rome declared war on Praeneste. According to Velleius Paterculus, the Romans in this year founded a colony at Setia

Livy and Plutarch provide parallel narratives for 381. In that year the Volsci and Praenestines are said to have joined forces and, according to Livy, successfully stormed the Roman colony of Satricum. In response the Romans elected Marcus Furius Camillus as consular tribune for the sixth time. Camillus was assigned the Volscian war by special senatorial decree. His fellow tribune Lucius Furius Medullinus was chosen by lot to be his colleague in this undertaking. There are some differences between Livy and Plutarch in their accounts of the campaign that followed. According to Livy the tribunes marched out from the Esquiline Gate for Satricum with an army of four legions, each consisting of 4000 men. At Satricum they met an army considerably superior in number and eager for battle. Camillus, however, refused to engage the enemy, seeking instead to protract the war. This exasperated his colleague, Lucius Furius, who claimed that Camillus had become too old and slow and soon won over the whole army to his side. While his colleague prepared for battle, Camillus formed a strong reserve and awaited the outcome of the battle. The Volsci started to retire soon after the battle had started, and, as they had planned, the Romans were drawn into following them up the rising ground toward the Volscian camp. Here the Volsci had placed several cohorts in reserve and these joined the battle. Fighting uphill against superior numbers, the Romans started to flee. However Camillus brought up the reserves and rallied the fleeing soldiers to stand their ground. With the infantry wavering, the Roman cavalry, now led by Lucius Furius, dismounted and attacked the enemy on foot. As a result, the Volsci were defeated and fled in panic; their camp was also taken. A large number of Volsci were killed and an even larger number taken prisoners. According to Plutarch, a sick Camillus was waiting in the camp while his colleague engaged the enemy. When he heard that the Romans had been routed, he sprung from his couch, rallied the soldiers and stopped the enemy pursuit. Then on the second day Camillus led his forces out, defeated the enemy in battle and took their camp. Camillus then learned that Satricum had been taken by Etruscans and all the Roman colonists there slaughtered. He sent the bulk of his forces back to Rome, while he and the youngest men fell upon the Etruscans and expelled them from Satricum. Having described Camillus' victory at Satricum, Livy and Plutarch move on to narrate the Roman annexation of the Latin town of Tusculum.

==== Modern interpretations ====
Of all the old Latin towns, Lanuvium was closest to Pomptine plain. It is therefore no surprise that she now joined the struggle against Rome. While the details provided by Livy for the campaign of 382 are plausible, the original records likely only stated there was fighting against Praeneste and Velitrae. Of the two versions of Camillus' victory at Satricum in 381, Plutarch's is thought to be closer to the earlier annalists than that of Livy. Notably, Livy presents a more noble picture of Camillus than Plutarch, and he has also compressed all the fighting into one day rather than two. That the Praenestines should have joined with the Volsci at Satricum and been defeated there by Camillus is credible enough; however most, if not all the details surrounding the battle, including the supposed quarrel between Camillus and Lucius Furius, are today considered to be later inventions. Especially the scale of the battle and the Roman victory have been vastly exaggerated.

=== Defeat of Antium and destruction of Satricum 380–377 ===
==== Ancient narratives ====
Livy is our only source for the next few years. He reports that in 380 the Romans stormed Velitrae, but the main event of that year was the Roman Dictator Titus Quinctius Cincinnatus successful campaign against Praeneste who was forced to sue for peace. In 379 the Romans assigned command of the Volscian war to consular tribunes Publius and Gaius Manlius due to the two's high birth and popularity, but this proved to be a mistake. The Roman commanders sent out their foragers without first doing any scouting, and were then tricked into an ambush by an enemy spy who falsely reported that the foragers had been surrounded. The Volsci also attacked the Roman camp. In Rome it was first decided to nominate a Dictator, but when the Romans realized that the Volsci did not intend to follow up their victory, they chose to recall their army from Volscian territory instead. New colonists were also sent to reinforce Setia. The next year, 378, the Volsci invaded and plundered Roman territory in all directions. At Rome the tribunes of the plebs first obstructed the enrolment of troops until the patricians accepted their conditions that no war tax would be paid until the war was over and no debt suits be brought to court. With these internal difficulties out of the way, the Romans divided their forces into two armies. One, commanded by consular tribunes Spurius Furius Medullinus and Marcus Horatius Pulvillus, was to march towards Antium and the coastal areas, the other, under Quintus Servilius Fidenas and Lucius Geganius Macerinus, was to head for Ecetra and the mountains. Hoping to draw the Volsci into battle, the Romans set about ravaging the Volscian countryside. Having burned several outlying villages and destroyed the enemy's harvest, the two armies returned to Rome with their booty.

According to Livy in 377 the Volsci and Latins united their forces at Satricum. The Roman army, commanded by consular tribunes Publius Valerius Potitus Poplicola (the same Valerius who had commanded with Camillus against the Volsci in 386) and Lucius Aemilius Mamercinus, marched against them. The battle that followed was interrupted on the first day by a rainstorm. On the second the Latin resisted the Romans for some time, being familiar with their tactics, but a cavalry charge disrupted their ranks and when the Roman infantry followed up with a fresh attack they were routed. The Volsci and Latins retreated first to Satricum and thence to Antium. The Romans pursued, but lacked the equipment to lay siege to Antium. After a quarrel whether to continue the war or sue for peace, the Latin forces departed and the Antiates surrendered their city to the Romans. In fury the Latins set fire to Satricum and burned the whole city down except the temple of Mater Matuta - a voice coming from the temple is said to have threatened terrible punishment if the fire was not kept away from the shrine.

==== Modern interpretations ====
Casting the blame on the commanders rather than the soldiers, as Livy does in his description of the Roman defeat in 379, is a common theme in his writings. Livy's summary treatment of the 378 campaign suggest that there were no major Roman successes that year. Frequently mentioned in the Volscian wars of the 5th century, Ecetra appears here for the last time in recorded history. Modern historians have not been able to securely determine the location of this Volscian town.

Mater Matuta was a deity originally connected with the early morning light. The temple at Satricum was the chief centre of her cult. However, Livy also records the burning of Satricum, except the temple of Mater Matuta, in 346, this time by the Romans. Modern historians agree that this twice burning of Satricum in 377 and 346 is a doublet. Beloch, believing that the Romans would not have recorded a Latin attack on Satricum, considered the burning in 377 a retrojection of the events of 346. Oakley (1997) takes the opposite view, believing that the ancient historians are less likely to have invented the burning by the Latins than the burning by the Romans. Though the twice miraculous saving of the temple is discarded as a doublet, it does not automatically follow that hotly contested Satricum could not have been captured both in 377 and 346. Livy records that Satricum was recolonized by the Volsci in 348, but this is unlikely to be historical; if Satricum was destroyed by the Latins, it must have been reoccupied soon thereafter.

Judged by the foundation of colonies and land allotments in the Pomptine region, it appears that by this time the Volsci no longer posed a serious threat to Roman power. After two decades of successful conquest and consolidation, Rome now entered an era of internal struggle and political reform.

=== Operations against Velitrae 370–367 ===
According to traditional Roman chronology the years 375-371 were supposed to have been a period of anarchy in which no curule magistrates were elected at Rome. Modern historians consider the anarchy to have lasted no longer than a year, if it existed at all, and attribute the extension into five years being due to ancient historians' attempts to synchronize Roman and Greek history. The apparent break six-year break in Roman-Volscian affairs after 377 is therefore deceptive.

==== Ancient narratives ====
Livy chose to focus his account of the years 376-367 on internal political struggles at Rome leading up to the decision in 367 to replace the consular tribunes with two consuls as Rome's chief annually-elected magistrates, and the opening of this office to plebeians; making only passing references to Rome's external affairs. He writes that in 370 the Velitraeans raided Roman territory and attacked Tusculum. A Roman relief army broke the siege of Tusculum and in return laid siege to Velitrae. This siege is then supposed to have lasted a number of years in which nothing worth mentioning took place, until it ended with Roman success in 367. According to Plutarch, Velitrae surrendered to Camillus, dictator for the fifth time in 367, without a struggle. The capture of Velitrae is Camillus' last recorded exploit. He would fall victim to a plague that ravaged Rome in 365.

==== Modern interpretations ====
That Velitrae should have been under continuous siege for several years is unlikely. More probably she was the target of a series of annual campaigns until finally taken. After this defeat Livy makes no mention of conflict between Velitrae and Rome until 357.

== Sporadic warfare ==
=== First war with Privernum 358–357 ===
In 358 the Romans formed two new tribes, the Pomptina and Publilia. Clearly at least the Pomptina was established in the Pomptine region where Rome, after the successful wars of the previous decades, must now have had a firm grip.

Livy also records that in this year first Privernum and then Velitrae raided Roman territory. The Romans assigned the war against Privernum to one of the consuls of 357, Gaius Marcius Rutilus. The territory of Privernum had long been at peace and Marcius' army captured a large amount of plunder. Marcius let his soldiers keep everything, appropriating nothing for the State. The Privernates had formed an entrenched camp in front of their walls. The Romans stormed this camp and prepared to attack the town when the Privernates surrendered. A triumph was celebrated over the Privernates. The Fasti Triumphales records that Marcius Rutilus celebrated his triumph over the Privernates on 1 June. This is the first appearance in Roman history of Privernum, a powerful town located in the Amaseno valley, at that time the south-eastern limit of Roman power. Livy seems not to have considered Privernum a Volscian town, but several other ancient sources attest that this was the case.

Livy writes that in 353 the Latins reported to Rome that the Volsci had assembled an army and intended to ravage Roman territory. Command of this war was given to consul Marcus Valerius Poplicola. He set up camp at Tusculum, but had to return to Rome to nominate a dictator when war with the Etruscan city of Caere threatened. The sparse mention of Volsci in Livy's account of the 350s suggest that they had been subdued by the repeated fighting in previous years and for the moment posed little threat to Roman expansion.

=== Defeat of Antium and destruction of Satricum 346 ===
Livy states that colonists from Antium rebuilt Satricum in 348. Then in 346 news reached Rome that emissaries from Antium were attempting to stir up the Latins against Rome. Consul Marcus Valerius Corvus marched to Satricum with his army and engaged the Antiates and other Volscian troops in battle. The Volsci fled into Satricum, but surrendered just as the Romans were about to storm the town. 4000 men and numerous non-combatants were taken prisoner. Satricum was sacked and burned; only the temple of Mater Matuta was spared. The 4000 who had surrendered were marched in front of the consul's chariot during his triumphal procession and subsequently sold, bringing in a large sum for the State treasury. According to some of Livy's sources these prisoners were slaves that had been captured at Satricum. Livy found this more plausible than their being surrendered fighting men. The Fasti Triumphales records that Marcus Valerius Corvus celebrated his triumph over the Antiates and Satricani on 1 February.

Modern historians have widely considered the two destructions of Satricum in 377 and 346, both times only the temple of Mater Matuta survives, to be a doublet. The town's supposed rebuilding in 348 is more likely to be a reconstruction by a later annalist to explain how Satricum could be destroyed for a second time. Archaeological excavations have confirmed that only the temple of Mater Matuta survived of Satricum after the mid-fourth century. However, if then the double destruction of Satricum is rejected as unhistorical, it does not necessarily follow that this hotly contested town was not captured both in 377 and 346. The claim of 4000 captives taken, whether they be prisoners of war or slaves, is most likely a later invention and not based on any authentic record.

=== Capture of Sora 345 ===
Livy notes that the consuls of 345 took Sora, located in the middle Liri valley, from the Volsci by a surprise attack. This is the earliest known Roman campaign into the Liri valley, made possible by their earlier victory over the Hernici. The capture of Sora might represent a new Roman policy to completely destroy Volscian power. Sora is next heard of during the Second Samnite War when the Samnites took it from the Romans in 315. It is however unknown whether Rome held continuous control of Sora from 345 to 315. The next recorded Roman operations against the northern Volsci only took place in 329.

=== Wars with Privernum and Antium 341 ===
In 343 the First Samnite War broke out between Rome and the Samnites over the control of Campania and in 342 Rome were, according to several ancient writers, troubled with civil unrest and an army mutiny. Livy writes that the Privernates exploited this to make a sudden raid and devastate the Roman colonies of Norba and Setia. News also reached Rome that a Volscian army led by the Antiates had concentrated at Satricum. The Romans assigned both the war against Privernum and against Antium to one of the consuls for 341, Gaius Plautius Venno, while the other, Lucius Aemilius Mamercinus, campaigned against the Samnites. Plautius first defeated the Privernates and captured their city. A Roman garrison was imposed on them and two-thirds of their territory confiscated. Plautius then marched against the Antiates at Satricum. A hard battle which ended only a storm prevented further losses. Counting their losses, the Volsci decided to withdraw during the night, retreating to Antium and leaving their wounded and part of their baggage behind. The Romans gathered a large quantity of arms left behind at the battlefield and in the Volscian camps which the consul ordered burnt as a sacrifice to Lua Mater. He then ravaged the Volscian territory down to the coast.

The Volsci would have been motivated in their war against Rome both by the possibility exploiting a Rome distracted by war and civil strife, and the worrying prospect of being surrounded by Roman territory should Rome gain firm control of Campania. However several elements of Livy's account has been questioned by modern historians. A Roman capture of Privernum is recorded again for 329 when Lucius Aemilius Mamercinus was consul for a second time, this time with Gaius Plautius Decianus as his colleague. Some modern historians have therefore considered the war of 341 an unhistorical duplicate of that of 329. A supporting argument of this theory is that the Romans only established the tribe of Ufentina on former Privernatian territory in the census of 318 rather than in the census of 332. It is however not implausible in itself that Rome had to fight several wars against Privernum. The names of the consuls for the two wars would then be only a coincidence. The Roman garrison at Privernum, if historical, is unlikely to have remained there for long. The campaign against the Antiates has less serious problems. The battle being broken off by a storm is likely to be a later invention. The offering of the captured weapons to Lua Mater might also have been invented. But despite these later embellishments there are no fundamental reasons why Antium should not have fought against Rome in 341.

== Roman subjugation of the Volsci ==
The Volsci joined the Latins in their final bid to shake off Roman dominion, the Latin War, 340–338, but Rome was once again victorious and the Volscian cities were incorporated into the Roman Republic with varying degrees of political rights. Roman reversals in the Samnite Wars caused some unrest among the Volsci but had no lasting impact.

== Bibliography ==
- Cornell, T. J. (1995). The Beginnings of Rome- Italy and Rome from the Bronze Age to the Punic Wars (c. 1000–264 BC). New York: Routledge. ISBN 978-0-415-01596-7.
- Forsythe, Gary (2005). A Critical History of Early Rome. Berkeley: University of California Press. ISBN 0-520-24991-7.
- Oakley, S. P. (1997). A Commentary on Livy Books VI–X, Volume 1 Introduction and Book VI. Oxford: Oxford University Press. ISBN 0-19-815277-9.
- Oakley, S. P. (1998). A Commentary on Livy Books VI–X, Volume II: Books VII–VIII. Oxford: Oxford University Press. ISBN 978-0-19-815226-2.
