= Publius Cornelius Rutilus Cossus =

Late 5th-century Roman politician and soldier

Dictator of the Roman Republic
- In office: 408 BC
- Magister equitum: Gaius Servilius Structus Ahala

Consular tribune of the Roman Republic
- In office: 406 BC
- Colleagues: Gn. Cornelius Cossus, N. Fabius Ambustus, L. Valerius Potitus

Publius Cornelius Rutilus Cossus was a statesman and military commander from the early Roman Republic who served as Dictator in 408 BC.

== Family ==
Cossus belonged to the gens Cornelia, one of the most important patrician gentes of the Republic. His father was named Marcus, and his grandfather Lucius, but no magistracy is recorded for them. He was however the brother of the more famous Aulus Cornelius Cossus, one of the only three Romans awarded the spolia opima for having killed the king of Veii Lars Tolumnius in single combat. Aulus was then consul in 428, and consular tribune in 426. Publius' had at least two nephews: Gnaeus, consular tribune in 414 and consul in 409, and Publius, consular tribune in 408. Aulus, dictator in 385 and perhaps consul in 413, may have also been his nephew. The Cornelii Cossi were thus among the foremost families of the Republic at the end of the 5th century BC.

== Career ==
In 408 BC, a large army comprising mainly Volsci and Aequi assembled at Antium. When news of this reached Rome, the Senate, thinking the situation to be a dangerous one, called for the appointment of a dictator to lead the war effort. This caused consternation among two of the three Consular tribunes, Gaius Julius Iulus and Publius Cornelius Cossus, who wanted the command to stay with them. The disagreement stoked the existing tensions in Rome during the Conflict of the Orders, but Livy's narrative is confused on these events. The situation was only resolved when the third tribune, Gaius Servilius Structus Ahala, seeing that Iulus and Cornelius could not be persuaded, rose to nominate Rutilus Cossus, Cornelius' uncle. Rutilus Cossus then appointed Ahala as his magister equitum, which is doubtless the result of a power-sharing negotiation between the consular tribunes.

Rutilus Cossus and Ahala then led the army out to Antium. They defeated the Volscian coalition in one battle before laying waste to the countryside and storming the Volscian fortress at Lake Fucinus. As many as 3.000 Volsci were taken prisoner. When Cossus returned to the city, he lay down the office of dictator and, according to Livy, did not receive much acclaim for his success. Indeed, according to the Fasti Triumphales, Rutilus Cossus was not awarded a triumph.

Rutilus Cossus was elected as one of the consular tribunes for the year 406 BC, alongside Gnaeus Cornelius Cossus, his distant cousin, Numerius Fabius Ambustus, and Lucius Valerius Potitus. The Senate ordered a new war on Veii, but the consular tribunes opposed it, arguing that the war against the Volsci was not over. Rutilus Cossus was given the command against the city of Ecetra, while Fabius took Anxur. The consular tribunes then shared the booty with the soldiers, which improved the relations between plebeians and patricians. The Senate followed and ordered that citizens must be paid while serving, whereas they had to cover their own expenses before.

== Bibliography ==
=== Ancient sources ===
- Livy, Ab Urbe Condita.
- John the Lydian, de magistratibus.
- Fasti Consulares.
- Fasti Triumphales.

=== Modern sources ===
- T. Robert S. Broughton, The Magistrates of the Roman Republic, American Philological Association, 1952–1986.
