= Ferentina =

Ferentina was the patron goddess of the city Ferentinum, Latium. She was protector of the Latin commonwealth. She was also closely associated with the Roman Empire.

A grove sacred to the goddess was used as the site of a famous meeting of the leaders of the Latin towns with the last king of Rome, Lucius Tarquinius Superbus, at the beginning of his reign. The leading citizen of Aricia, Turnus Herdonius was murdered at the command of Tarquinius, by being drowned in the sacred waters of the grove.

The sacred grove also features in the history of Gaius Marcius Coriolanus. In 491 BC, the Volscian leader Attius Tullus Aufidius sought to stir up trouble in Rome by contriving for the Roman Senate to expel the Volsci from the city during the Great Games. Attius met the fleeing Volsci at Ferentina's grove, and spoke to them, stirring up their feelings against Rome. Attius' actions led to a war between Rome and the Volsci.
