= Damophilus (painter) =

Ancient greek painter and coroplast

Damophilus (Ancient Greek: Δαμόφιλος) was an ancient Greek painter and coroplast.

Damophilus was probably from Magna Graecia and worked in Rome. Along with his colleague Gorgasus, he was responsible for the decoration of the Temple of Ceres, which was consecrated in 493 BC and located between the Circus Maximus and the Aventine. He was responsible for the decoration of the west side of the temple. During the work, the oldest Etruscan decorative reliefs were removed, framed, and recycled. Damophilus and Gorgasus worked in the Greek style. They created acroteria made of terracotta and painted murals. The works were signed in the form of the artist's epigrams. During later renovations, however, the works were preserved. Today, none of this has been transmitted, at least not to be assigned.

It cannot be conclusively proven that Damophilus of Himera, active in the second half of the 5th century BC and regarded as the master of Zeuxis of Heraclea, is the same individual.

== Bibliography ==
- Pliny the Elder, Natural History, 35.61; 35.154.
- Rossbach, Otto (1901). "Damophilos 8". Realencyclopädie der classischen Altertumswissenschaft (in German) (Stuttgart). IV,2: 2076 ff.
- Neudecker, Richard (1997). "Damophilos". DNP (in German) 3. In Damophilos (Stuttgart: Metzler). p. 303. ISBN 3-476-01473-8.
- Vollkommer-Glökler, Doris (2007). "Damophilos". In Vollkommer, Rainer, ed. Künstlerlexikon der Antike. Über 3800 Künstler aus drei Jahrtausenden (in German) (Hamburg: Nikol). p. 157. ISBN 978-3-937872-53-7.
