= Virgilia =

Character in Coriolanus

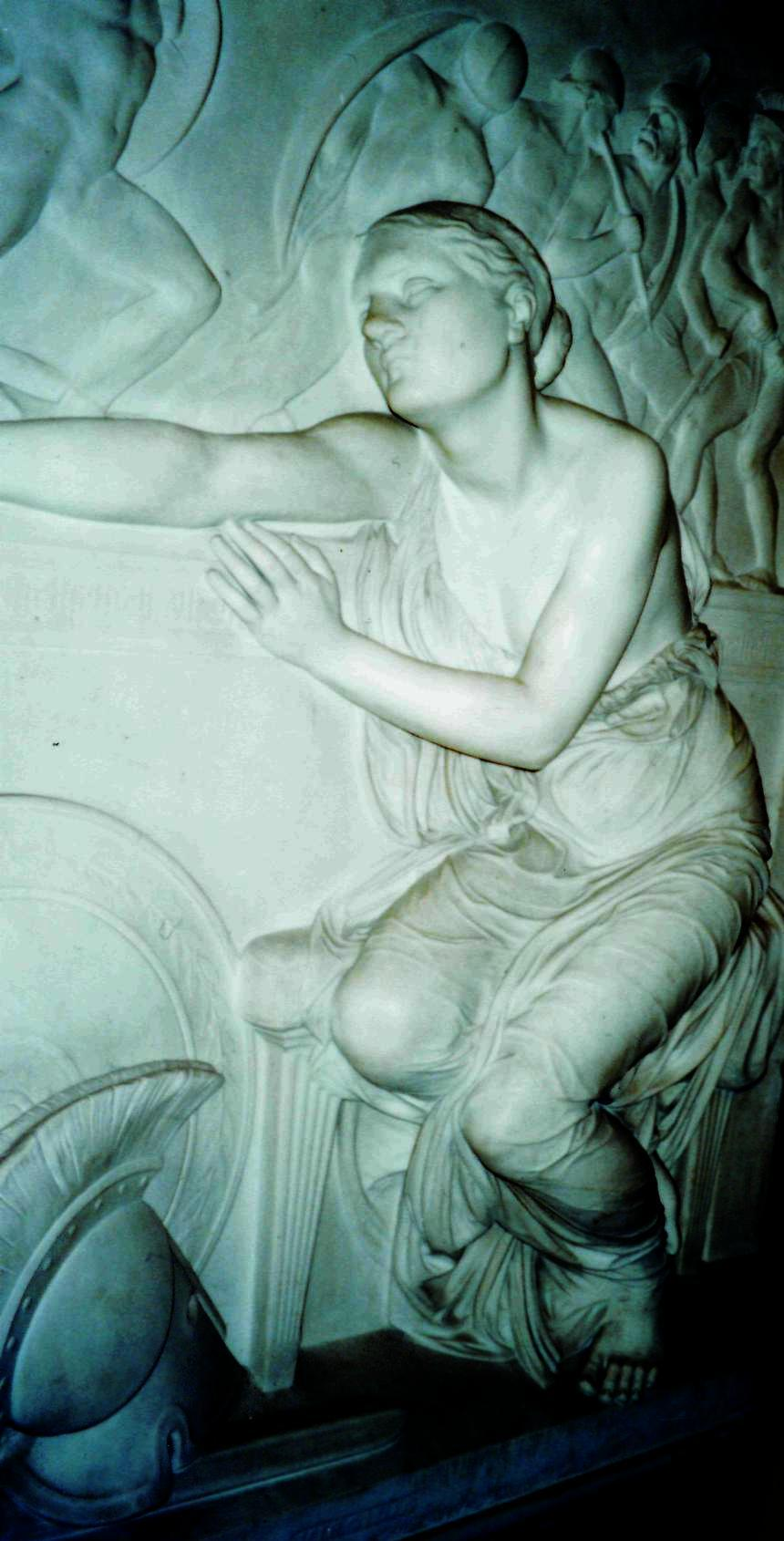
"Virgilia bewailing the absence of Coriolanus" by Thomas Woolner

Virgilia is the wife of Coriolanus in William Shakespeare's play Coriolanus (1607–1610), in which same play Volumnia is his mother.

== Origins ==
The life of the legendary figure Caius Marcius Coriolanus has been recorded more than once. In the very influential account most familiar to Shakespeare, Plutarch's Lives of the Noble Greeks and Romans, Coriolanus' wife's name is Virgilia, or in John Dryden's translation, Vergilia. However, some accounts (Brewer, 1898) say that his wife's name was actually Volumnia, probably following the Roman historian Livy, wherein the wife is called Volumnia and the mother Veturia.

== Role in the play ==
Virgilia is Coriolanus' wife and the mother of his son. She goes with her mother-in-law and son to the Volsce' camp to sue to Coriolanus not to make war against Rome. She, like Volumnia, is honored for making this peace.

It is also through Virgilia that audiences see a new side of the warrior. Critic Unhae Langis argued that "Virgilia's erotic presence evokes in her husband aspects of him rarely disclosed publicly—gentleness, respect, and passion towards her" (19–20).

== Critical reception ==
Virgilia is described by John Ruskin as "perhaps loveliest" of Shakespeare's female characters.

19th-century critic Anna Jameson described Virgilia as possessing "modest sweetness,"conjugal tenderness, " and "fond solicitude," in contrast to what she saw as the "haughty temper," "admiration of the valour and high hearing of her son," and "proud but unselfish love for" Coriolanus of Volumnia.

== Performance history ==
In the 2011 film Coriolanus directed by Ralph Fiennes, Virgilia is played by Jessica Chastain.

In 2018, Alexis Gordon played Virgilia at the Stratford Festival. In that production, Virgilia was played as pregnant.
