= 493rd =

493rd may refer to:

- 493d Bombardment Group, inactive United States Army Air Force unit
- 493d Bombardment Squadron or 93d Air Refueling Squadron (93 ARS), part of the 92d Air Refueling Wing at Fairchild Air Force Base, Washington
- 493d Fighter Squadron (493 FS), nicknamed "The Grim Reapers", part of the 48th Fighter Wing at RAF Lakenheath, England

== See also ==
- 493 (number)
- 493, the year 493 (CDXCIII) of the Julian calendar
- 493 BC
