= Aulus Cornelius Cossus (dictator) =

4th-century BC Roman politician and soldier

Dictator of the Roman Republic
- In office: 385 BC
- Magister equitum: Titus Quinctius Capitolinus

Aulus Cornelius Cossus (fl. early 4th century BC) was a politician and general in the early Roman Republic who was appointed dictator in 385 BC to quell the alleged revolution of Marcus Manlius Capitolinus.

== Life ==
Although a member of the important patrician gens Cornelia, the lack of contemporary sources and subsequent historiographical tradition of Rome has caused some confusion in the career of Cossus. This is due to his namesake, who had won the spolia opima and served as consul in 428. One of these men is recorded as serving as consul in 413, though which of the two it was is debated.

== Background to the dictatorship of 385 BC ==
=== War with the Volsci ===
For much of the early Republic, Rome was in a state of constant war with its neighbours in central Italy. To the south, the Volsci had posed a military threat since at least the time of the king Lucius Tarquinius Superbus and by the early 4th century BC, wars were regularly fought along the border. In 385, another war between the two broke out. The situation in this case was made worse by the refusal of the Roman allies among the Latins and Hernici to supply troops to field against the Volsci, supposedly out of fear.

=== Marcus Manlius Capitolinus ===
At Rome, the situation was also difficult as the ruling patrician elite was contested by the rest of the citizenry, the plebeians, in a social crisis known as the Conflict of the Orders. The Gallic Sack of Rome in 390 ruined many of them, and the patrician and ex-consul Marcus Manlius Capitolinus is said to have supported the plebs. In 385, he sold his estate to repay some of their debts and was the first patrician to leave his order to side with the plebeians. On his motivation, Livy explains that Capitolinus was aggrieved at the praise that Marcus Furius Camillus had received for his lifting the Gallic siege of Rome in 390 and the comparative lack of respect paid to him despite his command of the defences on the Capitoline Hill. The Roman historian had a negative view of Capitolinus, adding that he "abused the Senate and courted the populace."

The office of the dictator had already been used on numerous occasions in the previous century to avert a potential military disaster. In this case, the Senate used the war with the Volsci and the refusal of the allies to fight as a reasonable pretext for the appointment of Cossus, though Livy reports that the threat posed by Manlius (which the suspension of regular judicial practice that the dictatorship entailed could diffuse) was the main reason for their decision.

== Dictatorship ==
Cossus was appointed dictator and promptly chose Titus Quinctius Capitolinus as his magister equitum. He immediately set about dealing with the military threat posed by the Volsci, moving into territory occupied by them, either because he thought them a genuine and pressing threat or that a swift victory on the battlefield and the personal prestige that would result would strengthen his hand in solving Rome's social problems.

Despite the defeats they had suffered in recent wars, the Volsci were able to field a large army, helped in no small part by the aid provided by the Latins and Hernici, as well as other former Roman allies, who supplied reinforcements. In a pitched battle, the Volsci relied heavily on weight of numbers to break a disciplined Roman battle line. The Romans, organised effectively by Cossus, routed them.

After discovering that prominent citizens from the Latins and Hernici were among the prisoners-of-war, Cossus decided against disbanding his forces, keeping them encamped in case the Senate wanted to pursue a war against the former allies. He returned to the city, called a meeting of the senators, and requested they remain by his side until the matter of Manlius was resolved. The next day, he ordered his chair to be placed in the comitium and summoned Manlius.

At the public meeting, Cossus, surrounded by the members of the Senate, demanded Manlius' renouncing his accusations against the Senate and patricians. When he refused, Cossus ordered him to be taken to prison. He was subsequently tried for seeking kingly power; he was sentenced to death and thrown from the Tarpeian Rock.

Cossus was awarded a Triumph for his victory over the Volsci but this only increased his unpopularity amongst the Roman plebs, who thought the celebration was more for his suppression of their champion than the defeat of a common enemy. Soon after the Triumph, Cossus resigned the dictatorship "and so removed the terror which he inspired that the tongues and spirits of men were once more free."

Tim Cornell however mentions that Livy's account on the events surrounding Capitolinus is unreliable, as he wrote at the beginning of the Empire and had a limited knowledge of the early Republican political and social contexts. He therefore built a narrative that would look coherent to his readers, but which distorts the facts.

== Bibliography ==
=== Ancient sources ===
- Livy, Ab Urbe Condita.
- Fasti Consulares.

=== Modern sources ===
- T. Robert S. Broughton, The Magistrates of the Roman Republic, American Philological Association, 1952–1986.
- F. W. Walbank, A. E. Astin, M. W. Frederiksen, R. M. Ogilvie (editors), The Cambridge Ancient History, vol. VII, part 2, The Rise of Rome to 220 B.C., Cambridge University Press, 1989.
