= Corbio =

Ancient town of Latium in central Italy

Coordinates: 41°46′38.3″N 12°55′3.6″E

Corbio was an ancient town of Latium in central Italy.

In around 488 BC, Corbio was captured by an invading army of the Volsci, led by Gaius Marcius Coriolanus and Attius Tullus Aufidius.

According to Livy, the town was destroyed by Quintus Minucius Esquilinus around 457 BC for having betrayed their garrison.
