= Vitellia (ancient Latin town) =

Vitellia was an ancient town of Latium in central Italy.

In around 488 BC, Vitellia was captured by an invading army of the Volsci, led by Gaius Marcius Coriolanus and Attius Tullius.
