= Turnus Herdonius =

6th century BC leading citizen and statesman of Aricia in Latium

Turnus Herdonius was a leading citizen and statesman of ancient Aricia in Latium who spoke out against the last king of Rome, Lucius Tarquinius Superbus, and was killed as a result.

At the outset of his reign, Tarquinius Superbus called a meeting of the Latin leaders to discuss the bonds between Rome and the Latin towns. The meeting was held at a grove sacred to the goddess Ferentina.

At the meeting Turnus inveighed against the arrogance of Tarquinius, and warned his countrymen against putting trust in him. Tarquinius then secretly bribed Turnus' servant to store a large number of swords in Turnus' lodging. Tarquin called together the Latin leaders, and accused Turnus of plotting a coup. The Latin leaders accompanied Tarquin to Turnus' lodging and, the swords then being discovered, Turnus' guilt was then speedily inferred, and he was condemned and was thrown into a pool of water in the grove, and a wooden frame ("cratis") placed over his head, into which stones were thrown, thereby drowning him.

Georges Dumézil saw the story of Turnus as a didactic myth, with his death representing one of Tarquin's three faults, followed by the capture of Gabii and the rape of Lucretia.

== Sources ==
- Livy, Ab urbe condita, 1.50-52
- Dionysius of Halicarnassus Roman Antiquities 4.45—4.48
- Georges Dumézil, Heur et malheur du guerrier: aspects mythiques, 105-114
