= Gorgasus =

Greek painter

Gorgasus (in Greek: Γόργασος) was a renowned ancient Greek painter who, along with the equally renowned Damophilus, was responsible for the decoration of the temple of the goddess Ceres (identified with the Greek Demeter) on the Aventine Hill in Rome, which faced the Great Hippodrome. The precise date of their work is uncertain. If the Damophilus mentioned is the same Damophilus from Himera in Sicily, who taught the well-known sculptor Zeuxis, their artwork might actually be from much later than when the temple was built in 496 BC, around 40 years later.

Gorgasus was the proponent of Greek art in ancient Italy, where, until his time, Etruscan art seemed to dominate, as mentioned by Pliny the Elder . Gorgasus' technique was plastic and dry painting or painting on clay relief plaques.

In 31 BC, when the temple was destroyed by fire, these plaques of Gorgasus were saved and later, when the temple was renovated under Emperor Augustus, they were repositioned in their original place, protected within frames (cornices).

== Bibliography ==
- Pollitt, Jerome Jordan. The art of Rome, c. 753 B.C.-A.D. 337: sources and documents, Cambridge University Press, 1983, pp. 17–18. ISBN 052127365X.
- "Μεγάλη Ελληνική Εγκυκλοπαίδεια Δρανδάκη" (Great Greek Encyclopedia Drandaki) Volume H, p. 625.
