= Cominia gens =

Ancient Roman family

The gens Cominia was a minor plebeian family at ancient Rome, which appears in history from the Republic to imperial times. The first of this gens to hold the consulship was Postumus Cominius Auruncus in 501 BC, and from this some scholars have inferred that the Cominii were originally patrician; but all of the later Cominii known to history were plebeians.

== Origin ==
The surname Auruncus, borne by the consul of 501 BC, suggests that the Cominii might have been of Auruncan origin, although if this were so, the family had reached the highest level of Roman society by the beginning of the Republic. However, there could be other explanations for this cognomen. This early consulship implies that the family was once numbered amongst the patricians, although in the later Republic all of the Cominii seem to have been plebeians.

It may be that the family passed over to the plebeians during the fourth or fifth centuries BC, or that the patrician branch of the gens became extinct. Alternatively it has been suggested that the earliest consuls included members of a number of plebeian families, and that plebeians were not formally excluded from the office until the passage of the Twelve Tables in 450–449 BC. Furthermore, Valerius Maximus suggests that the nomen of Auruncus is uncertain, and that he might instead have belonged to the Postumia gens, although modern historians agree that Postumus was most likely his praenomen.

== Praenomina ==
The main praenomina of the Cominii were Lucius, Publius, and Gaius, all amongst the most common names at all periods of Roman history. Other praenomina used by this gens include Marcus, Quintus, and Sextus. Postumus, known from the first of the Cominii to hold office at Rome, was an ancient praenomen, sometimes erroneously amended to the nomen Postumius. Another Cominius is found with the praenomen Pontius, evidently a variation of Pompo, the Sabine equivalent of Quintus, rather than the nomen Pontius, although in some sources he is Gaius.

== Branches and cognomina ==
The first of the family known to history bore the surname Auruncus, suggesting some connection with the Aurunci, a people who lived to the southeast of Latium. Such cognomina belong to a large class of surnames derived from the names of towns, regions, or peoples. Whether the cognomen should be interpreted as meaning that the family migrated from there to Rome under the kings, or whether the consul of 501 BC acquired it as a personal surname is unknown, but the Romans fought against the Aurunci beginning in 503. None of the other Cominii of the Republic is mentioned with any surname, but a variety of personal surnames appears among the Cominii of the Empire.

== Members ==
This list includes abbreviated praenomina. For an explanation of this practice, see filiation.

- Cominius Suber, a legendary figure from Laurentum, and the husband of Egeria, according to Dositheüs. (Note: The author of a history of Italy consulted by Plutarch.) His second wife, Gidica, hanged herself after being spurned by her stepson, whom she falsely accused in a suicide note. Cominius then prayed to Neptune to cause his son's death. (Note: A nearly identical story, related by Plutarch together with that of Cominius and his son, was told of Hippolytus, son of Theseus.)
- Postumus Cominius Auruncus, consul with Titus Larcius in 501 BC. During their consulship, the Latin League withdrew from its alliance with Rome, led by Octavius Mamilius of Tusculum, the son-in-law of Tarquin the Proud, who yet sought to recover his kingdom. Cominius was consul a second time with Spurius Cassius Vecellinus in 493, during the first secession of the plebs.
- Pontius Cominius, (Note: Plutarch calls him Gaius Cominius. Here Pontius seems to be a variant of Pompo, the Sabine or Oscan equivalent of Quintus.) a youth celebrated for swimming the Tiber and conveying messages back and forth between the Capitol and the army during the Gallic occupation of Rome in 390 BC. In one account, he brought word of the army's return to drive out the Gauls; in another he conveyed the senate's appointment of Camillus as dictator to the general at Veii.
- Lucius Cominius, a military tribune in the army of the dictator Lucius Papirius Cursor, in 325 BC.
- Cominius, a tribune of the plebs during the Third Samnite War, accused the military tribune Gaius Laetorius Mergus of attempting to seduce a cornicularius serving under him, then attempting to force himself upon his subordinate. Laetorius was condemned to death.
- Publius Cominius P. f., a quaestor named in an inscription from Venusia in Samnium, dating from the second or third century BC.
- Cominius, commander of a troop of cavalry in the army of Tiberius Sempronius Gracchus in Hispania, in 178 BC.
- Sextus Cominius, an eques abused by Verres.
- Publius Cominius, a native of Spoletium, was a notable orator and friend of Cicero. He and his brother accused Gaius Cornelius, tribune of the plebs in 67 BC, who was successfully defended by Cicero.
- Lucius or Gaius Cominius, the brother of Publius, in whose accusation of Gaius Cornelius he joined.
- Quintus Cominius, one of Caesar's officers, was captured together with Lucius Ticida by Vergilius, one of Pompeius' commanders, near Thapsus while they were crossing over to Africa in 47 BC.
- Lucius Cominius, a Roman senator appointed by Augustus to assist Marcus Valerius Messalla Corvinus in his superintendence of the aqueducts.
- Gaius Cominius, an eques, wrote a libellous poem about the emperor Tiberius, but was pardoned by the emperor at the entreaty of his brother, a senator, in AD 24.
- Cominius Proculus, governor of Cyprus during the reign of Claudius, was likely the same senator who interceded with Tiberius on behalf of his brother, the eques Gaius Cominius. An inscription referring to a proconsul named Titus Cominius Proculus, the son of Titus, is a forgery, but may have been partly copied from a genuine inscription.
- Gaius Cominius Aufillenus Minicianus, dedicated an inscription at Brixia in Venetia and Histria, dating between the late first and late second century, to his dear friend, Publius Statius Paullus Postumius Junior, an eques who had been a quaestor, military tribune, and governor of Africa Proconsularis.
- Gaius Cominius, dedicated an inscription in Germania Superior, dating from the second or third century, for the welfare of the emperor. He may have been a person of some importance, but his position is not mentioned.
- Marcus Cominius Secundus, consul suffectus in AD 151, with Lucius Attidius Cornelianus.
- Cominius Bonus Agricola Laelius Aper, (Note: Previously read "Cominius Boëthius Agricola Aurelius Aper".) a military tribune in the Legio I Adiutrix, also served as prefect of a cohort at Bracara Augusta in Hispania Tarraconensis, and of an ala in Mauretania Caesariensis, among other appointments commemorated in an inscription from Arelate in Gallia Narbonensis, dating from AD 169.
- Publius Cominius P. f. Clemens, an eques of the late second century, had a distinguished military career as military tribune in the Legio II Adiutrix, and later admiral of the Classis Misenensis and Classis Ravennas. He was also governor of Lusitania and Dacia. His wife's name may have been Desticia Plotina.
- Lucius Cominius L. f. Maximus, a centurion primus pilus, had served in the Legio II Traiana Fortis, urban cohorts, vigiles, and Praetorian Guard. He was buried at Tibur in Latium, aged eighty-two years, eighteen days, in a tomb dedicated by his wife, Numitoria Moschis, dating from the late second or early third century.
- Lucius Cominius Vipsanius Salutaris, a native of Rome, was governor of Sicilia and Hispania Baetica, after having filled several lesser offices, and was summoned to Rome to serve on the emperor's council in AD 195.
- Cominia L. f. Vipsania Dignitas, a woman of senatorial rank, and perhaps the daughter of Salutaris, was one of the priestesses of Diana at Allifae during the early third century.

== See also ==
- List of Roman gentes

== Bibliography ==
- Gaius Julius Caesar (attributed), De Bello Africo (On the African War).
- Marcus Tullius Cicero, Brutus, In Verrem, Pro Cluentio.
- Dionysius of Halicarnassus, Romaike Archaiologia (Roman Antiquities).
- Titus Livius (Livy), History of Rome.
- Valerius Maximus, Factorum ac Dictorum Memorabilium (Memorable Facts and Sayings).
- Quintus Asconius Pedianus, Commentarius in Oratio Ciceronis Pro Milone (Commentary on Cicero's Oration Pro Milone).
- Sextus Julius Frontinus, De Aquaeductu (On Aqueducts).
- Publius Cornelius Tacitus, Annales.
- Lucius Mestrius Plutarchus (Plutarch), Lives of the Noble Greeks and Romans (Parallel Lives); Parallela Minora (Minor Parallels).
- Appianus Alexandrinus (Appian), Hispanica (The Spanish Wars).
- Dictionary of Greek and Roman Biography and Mythology, William Smith, ed., Little, Brown and Company, Boston (1849).
- Theodor Mommsen et alii, Corpus Inscriptionum Latinarum (The Body of Latin Inscriptions, abbreviated CIL), Berlin-Brandenburgische Akademie der Wissenschaften (1853–present).
- Dictionary of Greek and Roman Geography, William Smith, ed., Little, Brown and Company, Boston (1854).
- René Cagnat et alii, L'Année épigraphique (The Year in Epigraphy, abbreviated AE), Presses Universitaires de France (1888–present).
- August Pauly, Georg Wissowa, et alii, Realencyclopädie der Classischen Altertumswissenschaft (Scientific Encyclopedia of the Knowledge of Classical Antiquities, abbreviated RE or PW), J. B. Metzler, Stuttgart (1894–1980).
- George Davis Chase, "The Origin of Roman Praenomina", in Harvard Studies in Classical Philology, vol. VIII, pp. 103–184 (1897).
- Hans Petersen, "The Numeral Praenomina of the Romans", in Transactions of the American Philological Association, vol. xciii, pp. 347–354 (1962).
- Géza Alföldy, "Römische Statuen in Venetia et Histria" (Roman Statues in Venetia and Histria), in Epigraphische Quellen, Heidelberg (1984).
- Werner Eck, "Die Fasti consulares der Regierungszeit des Antoninus Pius, eine Bestandsaufnahme seit Géza Alföldys Konsulat und Senatorenstand" (The Consular Fasti for the Reign of Antoninus Pius: an Inventory since Géza Alföldy's Konsulat und Senatorenstand), in Studia Epigraphica in Memoriam Géza Alföldy, Werner Eck, Bence Fehér, Péter Kovács, eds., Bonn, pp. 69–90 (2013).
