= Hirtia gens =

Family in ancient Rome

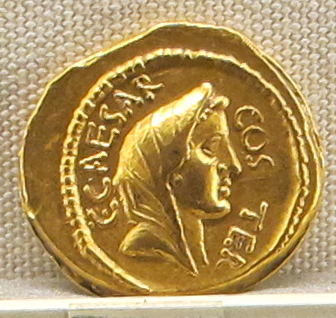
Aureus of Aulus Hirtius, depicting Caesar in his third consulship.

The gens Hirtia (Hīrtia) was a plebeian family at ancient Rome. The most distinguished member of the gens under the Republic was Aulus Hirtius, consul in 43 BC.

== Origin ==
The Hirtii probably came from Ferentinum, a town of the Hernici. The Hernici were an ancient Italic people, closely related to the Latins; they lived southeast of Latium. During the first two centuries of the Republic, they were frequently allied with, sometimes opposed to the Romans; in the course of the third century BC they seem to have been absorbed into the Roman state, and received Roman citizenship.

== Members ==
This list includes abbreviated praenomina. For an explanation of this practice, see filiation.

- Aulus Hirtius, father of the consul.
- Aulus Hirtius A. f., legate of Julius Caesar in Gaul, BC 58, possibly praetor or praefectus urbi afterward. Hirtius maintained frequent correspondence with Caesar, and spent time with Cicero and his family, attempting to reconcile the rival statesmen. After Caesar's murder, he continued to mediate between the emerging Roman factions, and his moderation earned him great respect. Consul in 43, he became attached to Octavian's faction, and defeated Marcus Antonius at the Battle of Mutina, but was slain in the fighting.
- Hirtia A. f., sister of the consul, was a potential bride for Cicero in 46 BC. He declined her on the ground that he could not devote his energies both to philosophy and a wife; but as he married Publilia shortly thereafter, it seems likely that Cicero was more concerned with obtaining a younger, more beautiful, and wealthier bride.
- Aulus Hirtius A. f., censor or quinquennalis during the reign of Augustus, repaired or restored the walls of Ferentinum. He may have been a son of the consul, but this identification is uncertain.

== See also ==
- List of Roman gentes

== Bibliography ==
- Eusebius Sophronius Hieronymus (St. Jerome), Adversus Jovinianum (Against Jovinianus).
- Johann Caspar von Orelli, Inscriptionum Latinarum Selectarum Collectio (Collection of Select Latin Inscriptions, 1828).
- Johann Heinrich Westphal, Die Römische Kampagne: in topographischer und antiquarischer Hinsicht (Campagna di Roma, in Topographic and Antiquarian Respects), Berlin (1829).
- Dictionary of Greek and Roman Biography and Mythology, William Smith, ed., Little, Brown and Company, Boston (1849).
- Oxford Classical Dictionary, N. G. L. Hammond and H. H. Scullard, eds., Clarendon Press, Oxford (Second Edition, 1970).
