= Pollusca =

Human settlement in Italy

Pollusca was a town in ancient times in the territory of the Volsci in central Italy. It was located south of Rome, north of the Volscian capital Antium, and just west of Corioli.

In 493 BC it was captured by a Roman army under the command of the consul Postumus Cominius Auruncus. In around 488 BC it was retaken by the Volsci.
