= Lavici =

Ancient Italian town

Lavici (Latin: Lavicum) was an ancient town of Latium in central Italy, located near modern Colonna.

== History ==
In around 488 BC, Lavici was captured by an invading army of the Volsci, led by Gaius Marcius Coriolanus and Attius Tullus Aufidius. The town was taken by the Romans in 418 BC under dictator Quintus Servilius Priscus Structus Fidenas.
