= Volumnia (wife of Coriolanus) =

Legendary wife of Roman general Gaius Marcius Coriolanus

Volumnia (according to Plutarch, her name was Vergilia) was the wife of Gaius Marcius Coriolanus in ancient Rome.

Coriolanus was exiled from Rome following a dispute with the tribunes of the plebs, and his family remained in Rome. Coriolanus became a leader of the neighbouring Volsci and led them against Rome, besieging it. Envoys from Rome failed to persuade Coriolanus to desist. Then an embassy of Roman matrons, including Volumnia, their two sons, Coriolanus' mother Veturia, and other matrons, went to Coriolanus and convinced him to break off the siege. Rome honoured the service of these women by the erection of a temple dedicated to Fortuna Muliebris (a female deity).

She appears as a character in Shakespeare's play, Coriolanus, named Virgilia.
