= Hernici =

Italic tribe in Ancient Italy

The Hernici were an Italic tribe of ancient Italy, whose territory was in Latium between the Fucine Lake and the Sacco River (Trerus), bounded by the Volsci on the south, and by the Aequi and the Marsi on the north.

== History ==
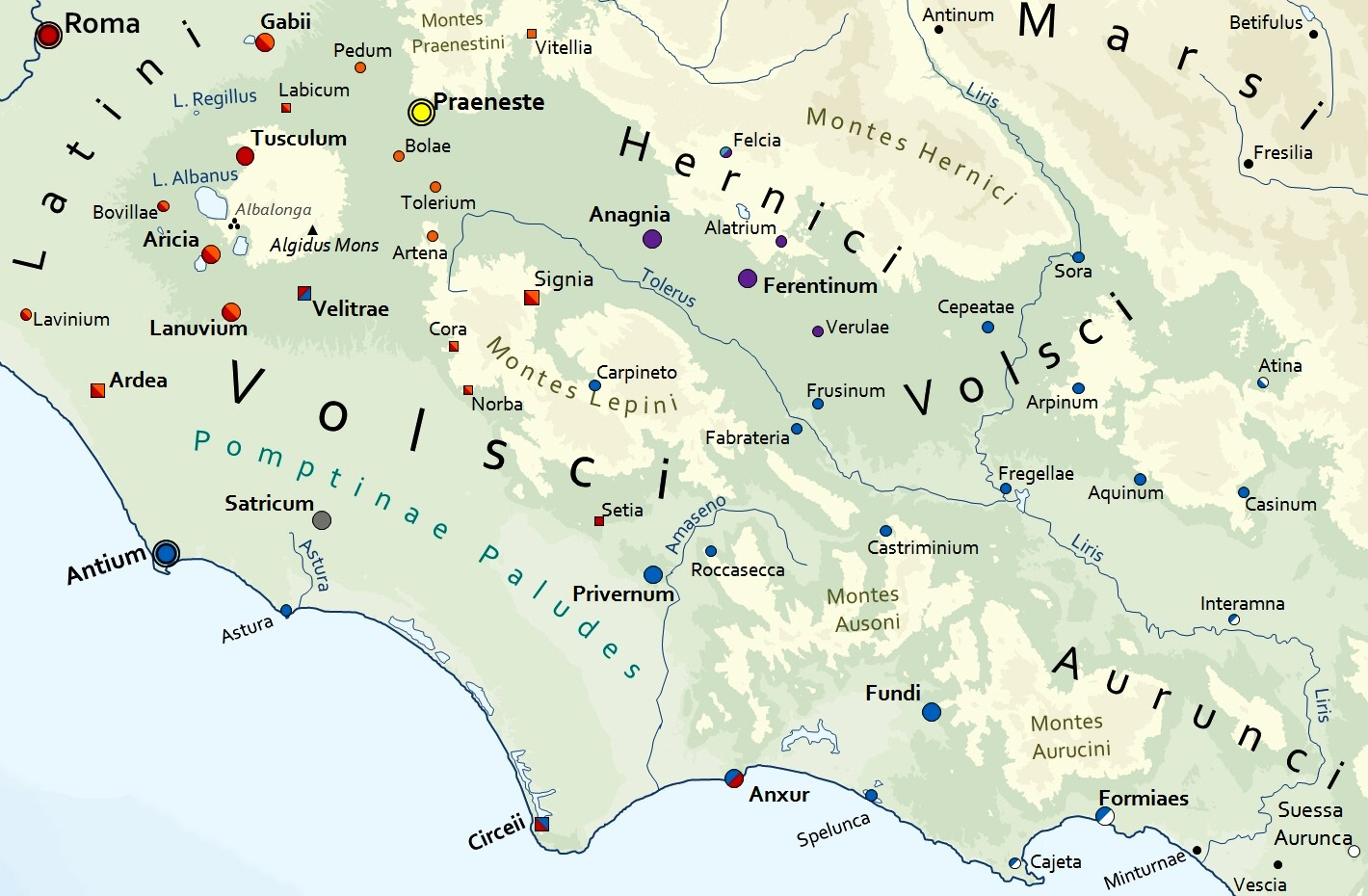
Settlements in central Italy (c. 400 BCE). Hernici Latins (including Rome) Volsci

For many years of the early Roman Republic, the Hernici were allied with Rome and fought alongside it against its neighbours.

In 495 BC Livy records that they entered into a treaty with the Volsci against ancient Rome.

They long maintained their independence, and in 486 BC they were still strong enough to conclude an equal treaty with the Latins.

In 475 BC they fought alongside the Latins against the Aequi and Volsci, and in the same year fought alongside Rome against the Veientes and Sabines. In 468 BC they fought alongside Rome against the Volsci.

In 464 BC they warned Rome of the betrayal of Ecetra, and fought alongside Rome against the Aequi who were allied with the Ecetrans.

They broke away from Rome in 362 and in 306, when their chief town Anagnia was taken and reduced to a praefectura, but Ferentinum, Aletrium and Verulae were rewarded for their fidelity by being allowed to remain free municipia, a position which at that date they preferred to the civitas.

The name of the Hernici, like that of the Volsci, is missing from the list of Italian peoples whom Polybius describes as able to furnish troops in 225 BC. By that date, therefore, their territory cannot have been distinguished from Latium generally, and it seems probable that they had then received full Roman citizenship. The oldest Latin inscriptions of the district (from Ferentinum) are earlier than the Social War, and present no local characteristic.

== Language ==
Hernican
- Region: Italy
- Extinct: (date missing)
- Language family: Indo-European: Italic; Osco-Umbrian; Oscan?; Hernican
- Writing system: Old Italic alphabet

Language codes
- ISO 639-3: xhr
- Glottolog: hemi1234

A couple of inscriptions show that the Hernican language was a member of the group of Osco-Umbrian (Sabellian) languages. Their name, with its "co" termination, classes them along with the "co"-tribes, like the Volsci, who would seem to have been earlier inhabitants of the west coast of Italy, rather than with the tribes whose names were formed with the "no"-suffix.

== Gentes of Hernician origin ==
- Cispia (gens)
- Hirtia gens
- Fabricia gens

== See also ==
- Hernici Mounts

== Bibliography ==
=== Primary sources ===
- Livius, Ab Urbe Condita. Liber VII. (c. 27–9 BCE, in Latin).
  - Livy (1905). From the Founding of the City. Book 7. Translated by Canon Roberts.
- Dionysius of Halicarnassus, Roman Antiquities, Book VIII.
- Polybios, Ἱστορίαι (Historiai) (c. 145–120 BCE, in Greek).
  - Polybius (1962) [1889]. "Forces Available to the Romans". Histories, Book 2. Translated by Evelyn S. Shuckburgh. Macmillan / Bloomington / Perseus Digital Library.

=== Literature ===
- Rowland, Robert J. (1983). "Rome's Earliest Imperialism". Latomus. 42 (4): 749–762. ISSN 0023-8856. JSTOR 41532980.
