= Ecetra =

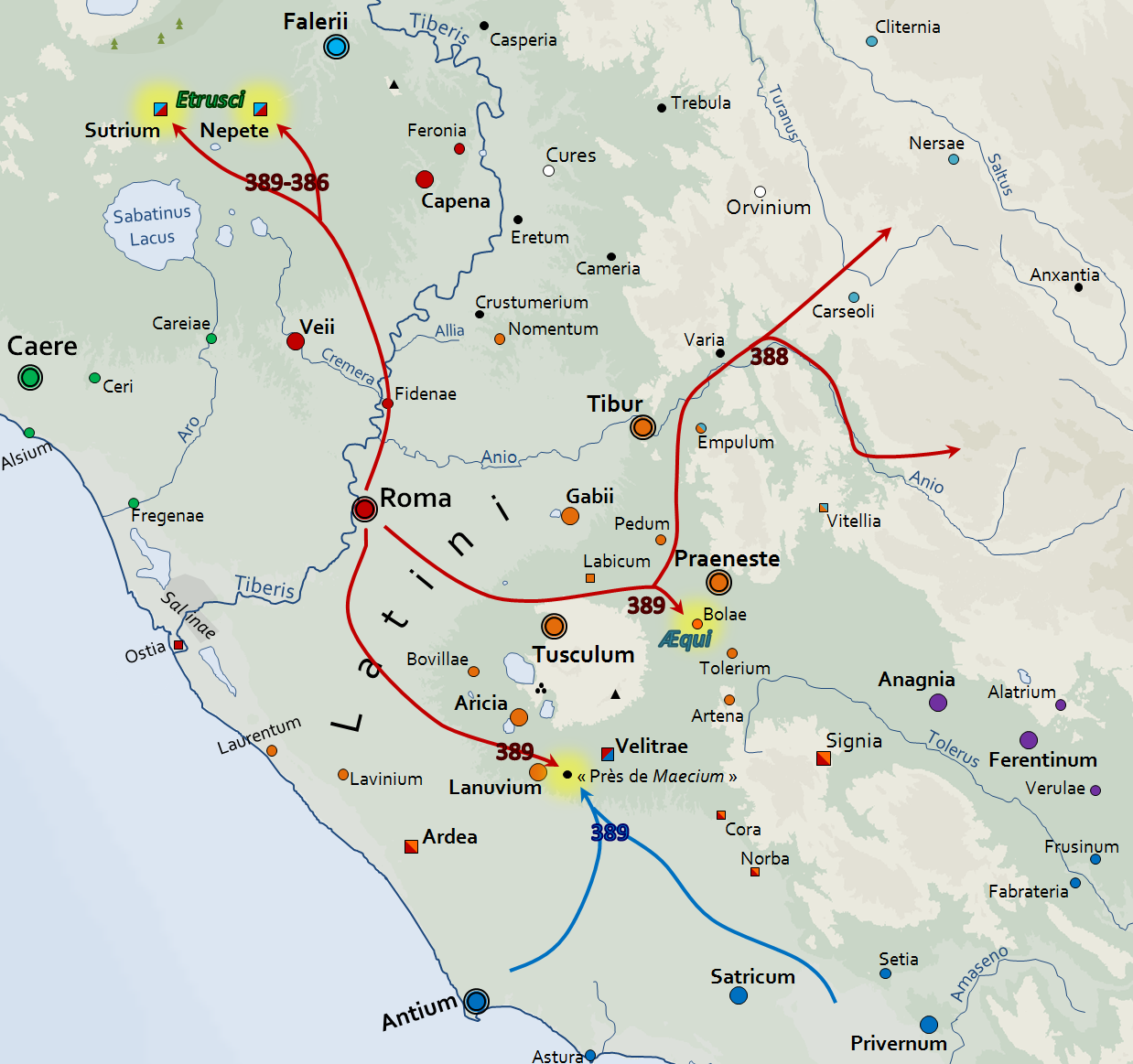
Movements during Rome's war with the Volsci, 389 B.C.

Ecetra was a town of the ancient Volsci tribe of central Italy. Its location is no longer known.

It is mentioned by Livy in 495 BC in the context of the failed Volscian invasion of Rome. Livy says that after the Roman victory, the ambassadors of Ecetra asked the Roman Senate for peace, who agreed on the basis that the Ecetran lands were ceded to Rome.

In 464 BC the Ecetrans allied with the Aequi and revolted against Rome. The Hernici warned Rome of the betrayal, and the Romans were ultimately victorious.
