= Longula =

Ancient city of Latium

Coordinates: 41.5933°N 12.6086°E

The monotypic mushroom genus Longula is now included in Agaricus; see Agaricus deserticola.

Longula was a town in ancient times in the territory of the Volsci in central Italy. It was located south of Rome, and just north of the Volscian capital Antium.

In 493 BC it was captured by a Roman army under the command of the consul Postumus Cominius Auruncus.

In around 488 BC it was retaken by the Volsci.
