= Agnomen =

Optional nickname in the Roman Republic

An agnomen (Latin: [aŋˈnoːmɛn]; pl.: agnomina), in the Roman naming convention, was a nickname, just as the cognomen had been initially. However, the cognomina eventually became family names, and so agnomina were needed to distinguish between similarly-named persons. However, as the agnomen was an additional and optional component in a Roman name, not all Romans had an agnomen.

Pseudo-Probus uses the hero of the Punic Wars, Publius Cornelius Scipio Africanus, as an example:

Men's personal names are of four types, praenomen, nomen, cognomen and agnomen: praenomen for instance Publius, nomen Cornelius, cognomen Scipio and agnomen Africanus.

Marius Victorinus further elucidates:

Now the agnomen comes from outside, and in three styles, from personality or physique or achievements: From personality, such as Superbus ["Haughty"] and Pius [displaying the Roman syndrome of virtues including honesty, reverence to the gods, devotion to family and state, etc.], from physique, such as Crassus ["Fatty"] and Pulcher ["Handsome"], or from achievements, such as Africanus and Creticus [from their victories in Africa and on Crete].

Africanus, Creticus and the likes are also known as victory titles. For example, Gnaeus Marcius Coriolanus earned his from the capture of Corioli.

== Etymology ==
Latin agnōmen (also spelled adnomen) comes from ad "to" and nōmen "name".

== Caligula ==
As a minimum, a Roman agnomen is a name attached to an individual's full titulature after birth and formal naming by the family. True Roman nicknames, fully replacing the individual's name in usage, are rare. One such example in which the nickname fully replaced the individual's name in usage was the Emperor Caligula; that name was used in place of and not along with his full name, which was Gaius Julius Caesar Augustus Germanicus. Caligula's praenomen was Gaius, his nomen Julius, his cognomen Caesar. Some agnomina were inherited like cognomina and thus established a sub-family. Caligula's agnomen came from the little boots that he wore as part of his miniature soldier's uniform while accompanying his father, Germanicus, on campaigns in northern Germania. In turn, Germanicus received his agnomen in 9 BC, when it was posthumously awarded to his father Nero Claudius Drusus in honour of his Germanic victories. At birth, Germanicus had been known as either Nero Claudius Drusus, after his father, or Tiberius Claudius Nero, after his uncle. Like Caligula, Germanicus is mostly referred to by his agnomen.

== Comparison with pseudonyms ==
An agnomen is not a pseudonym but a real name and is an addition to, not a substitution for, an individual's full name.

== See also ==
- List of Roman imperial victory titles
- Nomen gentilicium
- Praenomen
- Nomen nescio
- Courtesy name
