= Veturia =

Roman legendary figure, mother of Roman general Gnaeus Marcius Coriolanus

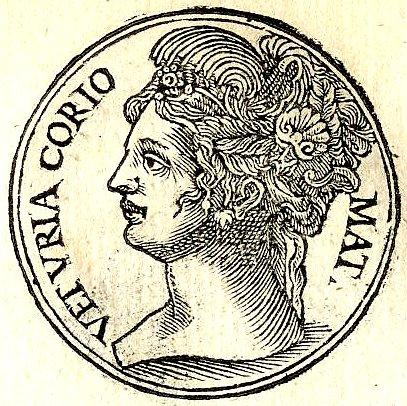
Veturia from Promptuarii Iconum Insigniorum

Veturia was a Roman matron, the mother of the possibly legendary Roman general Gnaeus Marcius Coriolanus. According to Plutarch her name was Volumnia.

Veturia came from a patrician family and encouraged her son's involvement in Roman politics. According to Roman historians, Coriolanus was expelled from Rome in the early fifth century BC because he demanded the abolition of the office of Tribune of the Plebs in return for distributing state grain to the starving plebeians. He settled with the Volscians, a people hostile to Rome, while formulating his revenge.

Coriolanus and the Volscians marched upon Rome and laid siege to the city. The Romans sent envoys to Coriolanus, but to no avail. Then Veturia, together with Coriolanus' wife Volumnia, plus other family members and matrons of Rome, successfully entreated Coriolanus to break off his siege.

The precise versions of the entreaties differ.

According to Plutarch, when Veturia came to her son's camp, Coriolanus embraced her and begged her to ally herself with his cause. Veturia refused on behalf of all the Roman citizens and convinced her son to cease his crusade against Rome, throwing herself at his feet and threatening to do harm to herself if he did not retreat. Coriolanus obliged, and marched away from Rome; soon, the angry and frustrated Volscians put him to death.

Livy says that Veturia refused to embrace her son, but ultimately convinced him to desist, and is quoted as having said:

"Before I receive your embrace, let me know whether I have come to an enemy or to a son; whether I am in your camp a captive or a mother? Has length of life and a hapless old age reserved me for this—to behold you an exile, then an enemy? Could you lay waste this land, which gave you birth and nurtured you? Though you had come with an incensed and vengeful mind, did not your resentment subside when you entered its frontiers? When Rome came within view, did it not occur to you, within these walls my house and guardian gods are, my mother, wife, and children? So then, had I not been a mother, Rome would not be besieged: had I not a son, I might have died free in a free country. But I can now suffer nothing that is not more discreditable to you than distressing to me; nor however wretched I may be, shall I be so long. Look to these, whom, if you persist, either an untimely death or lengthened slavery awaits."

Livy also records that sources differ as to Coriolanus' fate, and whether he lived on after the incident.

The Romans honored Veturia for her courage, patriotism, and strength in a crisis; she had succeeded where all men before her had failed. She became a model of Roman female virtue. A temple to divine Fortuna was built in honour of her and the other women. She did not ask for any special favors or honors, except that a temple be built as a monument of Female Fortune. Plutarch wrote: "The senate, much commending their public spirit, caused the temple to be built and a statue set up in it at the public charge; they, however, made up a sum among themselves, for a second image of Fortune, which the Romans say uttered, as it was putting up, words to this effect, “Blessed of the gods, O women, is your gift.”"

In Shakespeare's play Coriolanus, the character of Coriolanus' mother performs much the same function as in the Roman story, but her name has been changed to "Volumnia."

== See also ==
- Veturia gens
