= Postumus Cominius Auruncus =

Roman consul in 501 and 493 BC

Consul of the Roman Republic
- In office 1 September 501 BC – 29 August 500 BC Serving with Titus Larcius
- Preceded by: Opiter Verginius Tricostus (consul 502 BC), Spurius Cassius Vecellinus
- Succeeded by: Servius Sulpicius Camerinus Cornutus
- In office 1 September 493 BC – 29 August 492 BC Serving with Spurius Cassius Vecellinus
- Preceded by: Aulus Verginius Tricostus Caeliomontanus, Titus Veturius Geminus Cicurinus (consul 494 BC)
- Succeeded by: Titus Geganius Macerinus, Publius Minucius Augurinus

Personal details
- Born: Unknown Ancient Rome
- Died: 486 BC Ancient Rome

Postumus Cominius Auruncus was a two-time consul of the early Roman Republic.

In 501 BC, Cominius was consul with Titus Larcius, who Livy says was appointed as the first dictator of Rome. Other sources indicate the beginnings of hostilities with the Latins and a conspiracy among slaves during their term.

As the consuls of 493 BC, Cominius and Spurius Cassius Vecellinus were elected towards the end of the First secessio plebis in 494 BC. They also conducted a census.

Cominius achieved a military victory against the Volsci. He initially defeated a force from the town of Antium, then took the towns of Longula (to the north of Antium) and Pollusca. He laid siege to the town of Corioli and despite being attacked by a second force of Volsci from Antium, he achieved victory through the distinguished actions of Gaius Marcius Coriolanus, and captured Corioli.

In 488, he was among the envoys (legati), all of consular rank, sent to Coriolanus.

A puzzling and textually incomplete passage in Festus lists Cominius among several men who were burned publicly near the Circus Maximus in 486 BC. Valerius Maximus says that a tribune of the plebs burned nine colleagues for conspiring with Spurius Cassius Vecellinus, a consul in this year who plotted to make himself king. Since the plebeian tribunes numbered ten only much later, and since the listed names indicate that the men were of consular rank and patrician status, this incident during the Volscian Wars remains mysterious.

== See also ==
- Cominia gens

== Sources ==
- Broughton, T.R.S. (1986) [1951]. The Magistrates of the Roman Republic. Vol. 1. American Philological Association.

Political offices
Preceded by Opiter Verginius Tricostus; Spurius Cassius Vecellinus	Consul of the Roman Republic with Titus Lartius Flavus; 501 BC	Succeeded by Servius Sulpicius Camerinus Cornutus; Manius Tullius Longus
Preceded by Aulus Verginius Tricostus Caeliomontanus; Titus Veturius Geminus Cicurinus	Consul of the Roman Republic with Spurius Cassius Vecellinus; 493 BC	Succeeded by Titus Geganius Macerinus; Publius Minucius Augurinus
