= Corioli =

Ancient town in Italy

Corioli was a town in ancient times in the territory of the Volsci in central Italy, in Latium adiectum.

== Etymology ==
Linguist Roger Woodard, based on McCone, suggests the name of the town, Corioli, may derive from the Proto-Indo-European root *kóryos, meaning 'army'. Therefore, the town name would mean something akin to 'army camp'.

== Historical location ==
The town was located south of Rome, north of the Volscian capital Antium. The site is apparently to be sought in the North-Western portion of the district between the sea, the river Astura and the Alban Hills; but it cannot be more accurately fixed (the identification with Monte Giove, South of the Valle Aricciana, rests on no sufficient evidence), and even in the time of Pliny it ranked among the lost cities of Latium. Scholarship points that Corioli, along with Polusca and Longula, are mentioned together in ancient sources, yet disappear from the historical record "after the legendary age".

In 493 BC a Roman army under the command of the consul Postumus Cominius Auruncus laid siege to the town. However, whilst the Romans were focussed on the siege, another Volscian force arrived from Antium and attacked the Romans, and at the same time the soldiers of Corioli launched a sally. A young noble Roman, Gnaeus Marcius held watch at the time of the Volscian attack. He quickly gathered a small force of Roman soldiers to fight against the Volscians who had sallied forth from Corioli. Not only did he repel the enemy, but he charged through the town gates and then began setting fire to some of the houses bordering the town wall. The citizens of Corioli cried out, and the whole Volscian force was dispirited and was defeated by the Romans. The town was captured, and Marcius gained the cognomen Coriolanus.

It was retaken for the Volsci in around 488 BC by Coriolanus who, in disgust at his treatment by his countrymen, had deserted to the enemy. These events were fictionalized in William Shakespeare's play Coriolanus.

After this it does not appear in history, and we hear soon afterwards (446 BC) of a dispute between Ardea and Aricia about some land which had been part of the territory of Corioli, but had at an unknown date passed to Rome with Corioli.
