= Imperial Villa of Vicarello =

Ancient Roman villa

Coordinates: 42.16448°N 12.20748°E

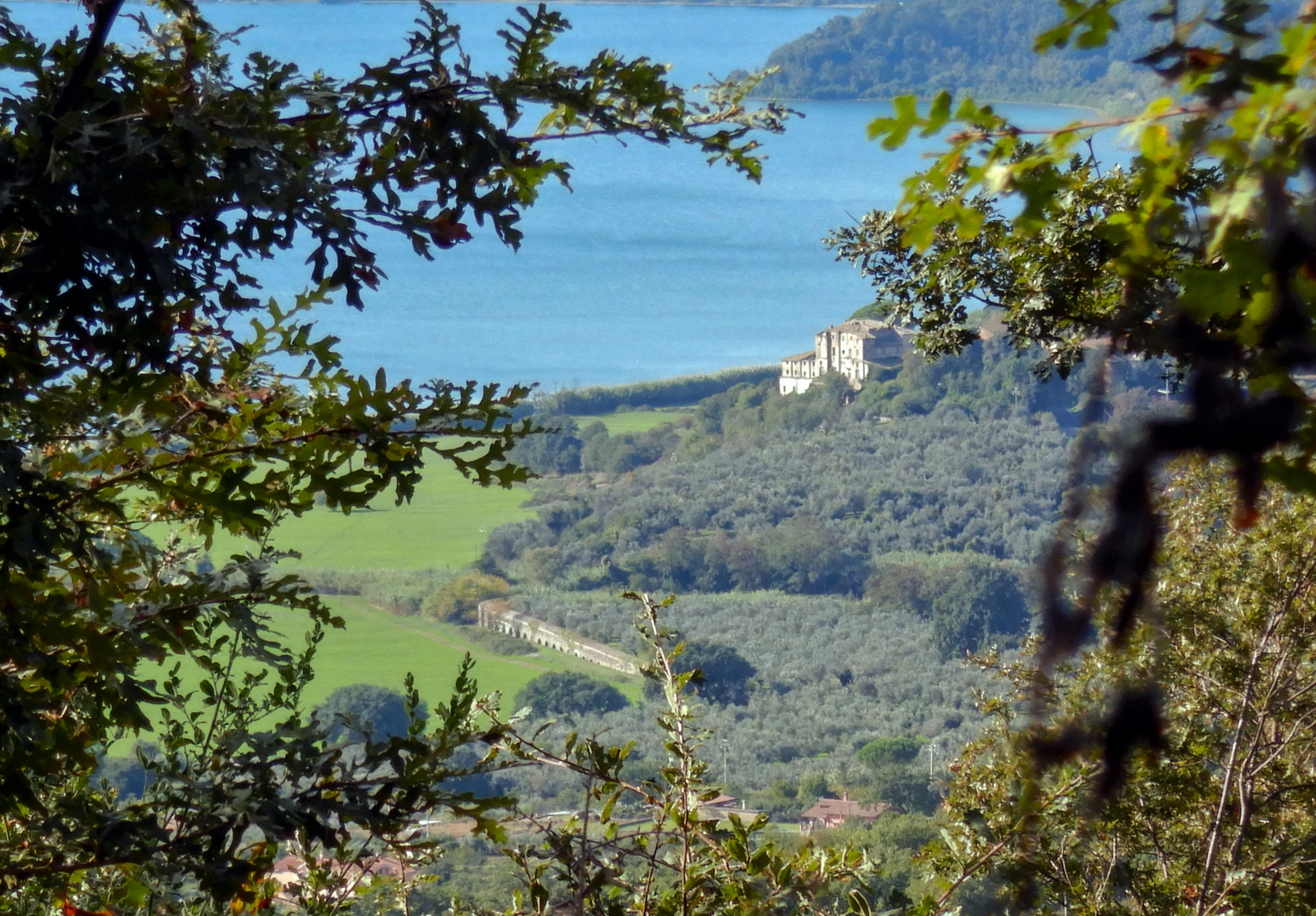
View of Villa Valadier (built over the Roman villa)

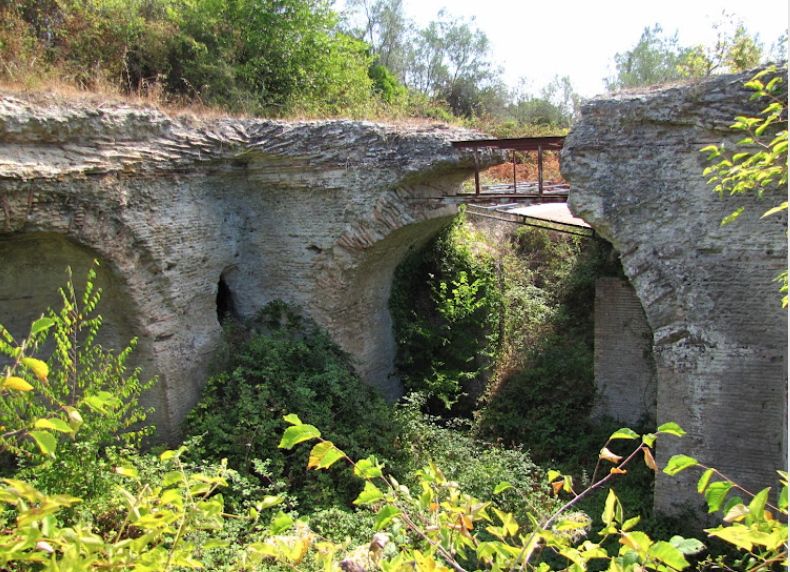
Nymphaeum of the baths

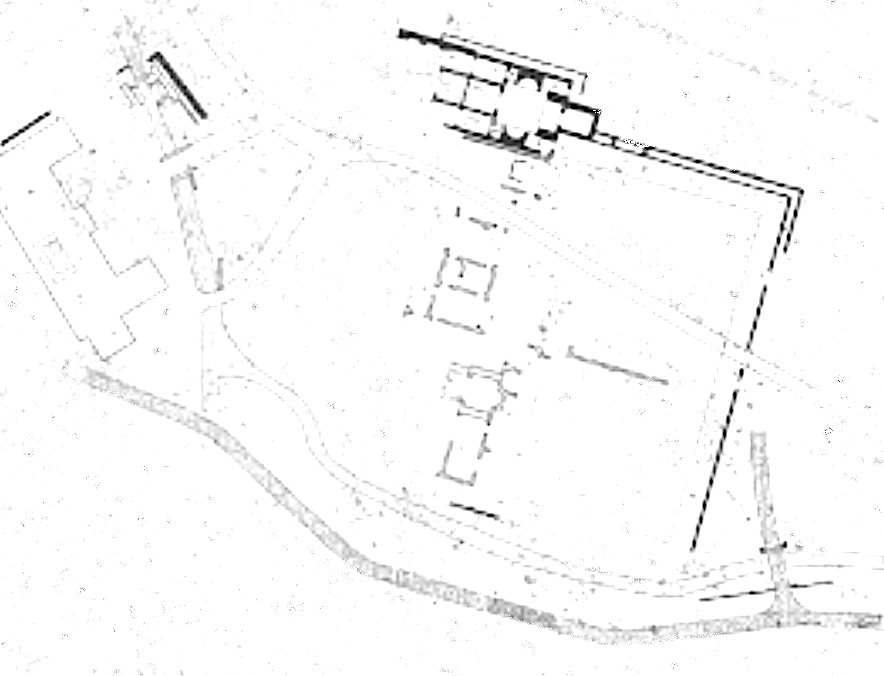
Plan of Baths of Vicarello with nymphaeum (top) and hot spring buildings (left)

The Imperial Villa of Vicarello was an ancient Roman villa that belonged to the emperors starting from Domitian (r.81-96). It is situated close to the north shore of Lake Bracciano and near the village of Vicarello and the modern town of Trevignano Romano. The current private Vicarello estate is a park of about 2000 hectares in which the Roman remains of the villa and associated monumental baths were discovered in the 19th century, some of which are still preserved. The two main ancient centres are:

- the village which includes the now-disused 17th century Villa Valadier overlooking the lake, built on the remains of the Roman villa or vicus (village).
- the remains of the (mainly public) baths adjacent to the natural springs, the Aquae Apollinares, which had also been a healing sanctuary to Apollo since Etruscan times as evidenced by the many votive objects found.

Vicarello was also an estate in the Roman period called the Vicus Aurelius, the origin of the name "Vicarello", as it had later belonged to the emperor Marcus Aurelius (r.161-180).

In 1999, the area became protected as part of the Regional Natural Park of Bracciano-Martignano.

== History ==
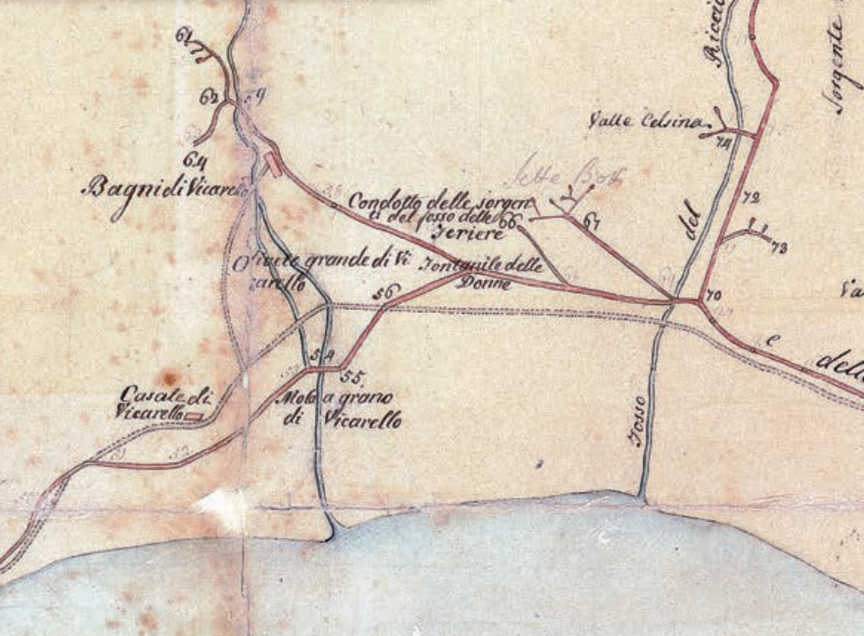
Ancient structures and Aqua Traiana aqueduct near Vicarello (Rome, Archivio di Stato di Roma, Collezione Disegni e mappe, 1789)

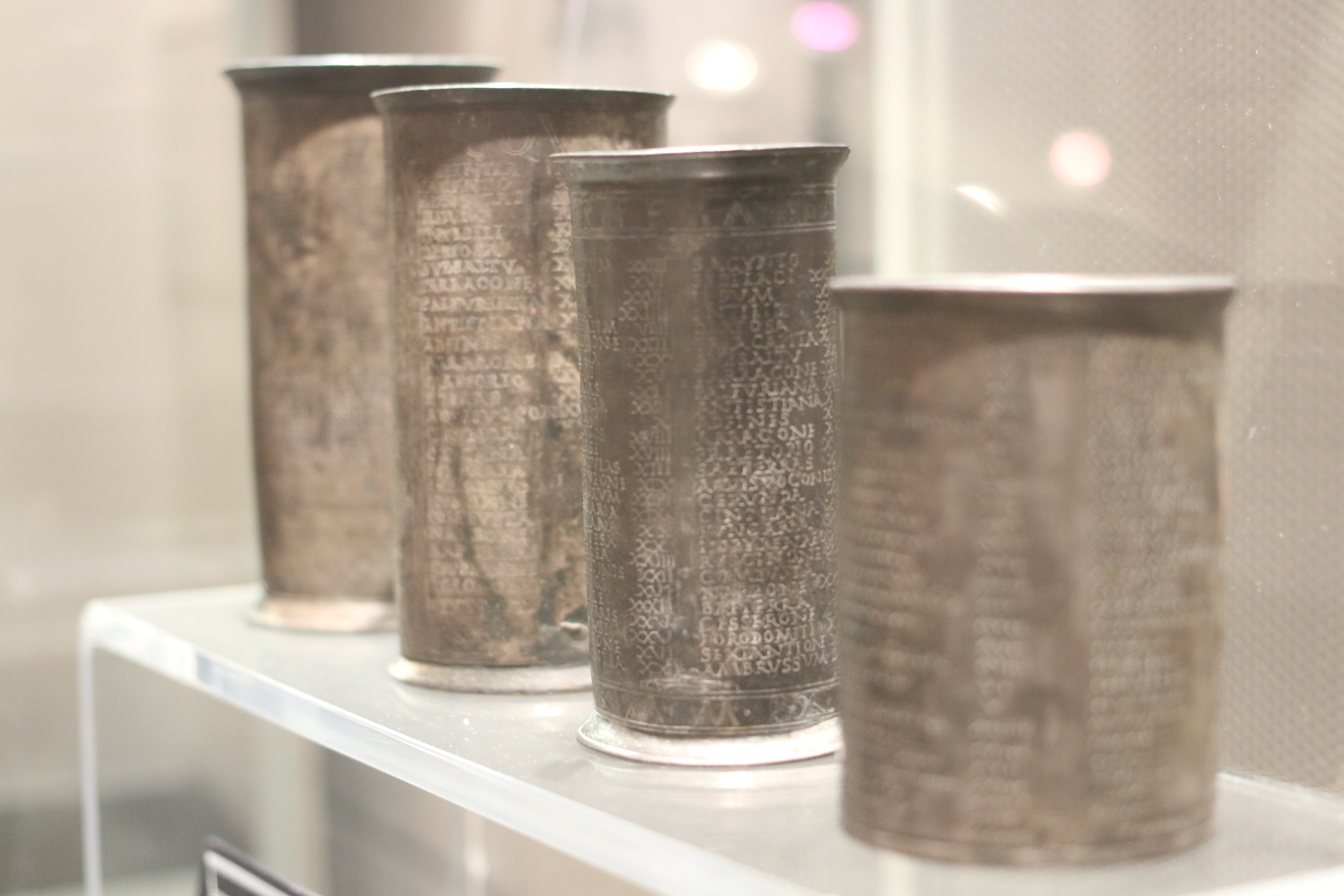
The silver "Vicarello Cups"

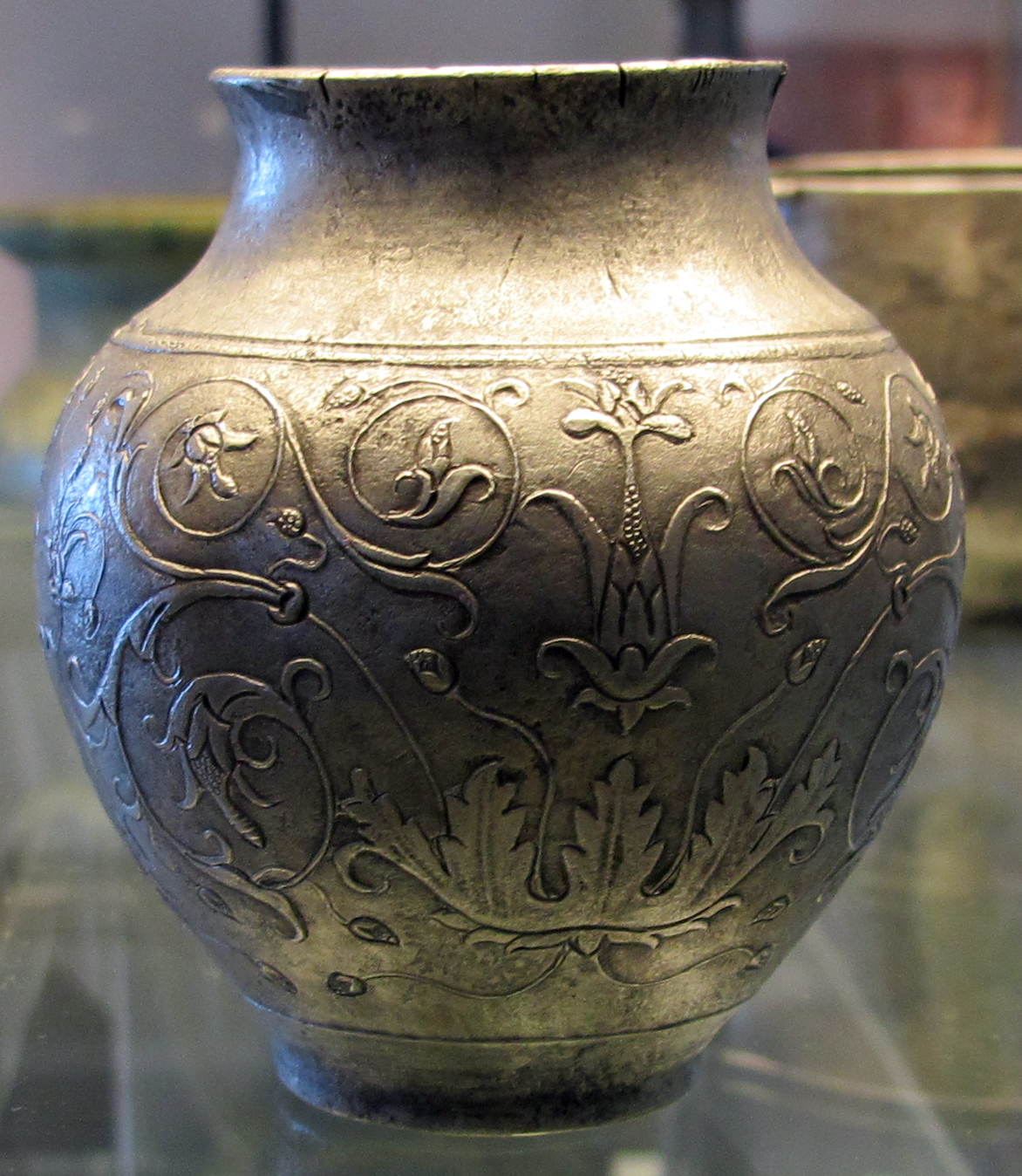
Silver Vase dedicated to Apollo, 50-100 AD

A continuous human presence since the 2nd millennium BC at the baths site and its identification as a healing sanctuary to Apollo was confirmed by the discovery in 1852 of a huge votive deposit dedicated to the cult of the waters. An Etruscan cemetery covered a large area on the lower slopes on either side of the Roman baths, revealed by field surveys in 1986 and 1992, which has been associated with the lost centre of Sabazia or Sabate.

By the Republic era the sanctuary was an important destination for pilgrims from nearby cities, including Rome, and from as far as Campania in the 3rd century BC as the sanctuary was connected to a trans-Italian road network. Extensive traces found of Republic and imperial remains around the villa/vicus and baths showed a complex covering a large area.

Domitian developed further the baths and the villa-estate as a single project, evidenced by brick stamps and inscriptions. Domitian's takeover of the baths likely resulted in their limitation to only members of the imperial court, as their public use is documented before and after his reign. Cold water springs located 200m to the north of the baths were harnessed in the "long springhouse" feeding the small cistern nearby. For increased water needs of the new monumental nymphaeum, Domitian added more springs to the main gallery of the "long springhouse" as well as the large Porcareccia cistern and a new bridge over the stream valley.

Domitian owned and developed several large villa-estates in Italy including those at the Alban Hills, Tusculum, Antium, Anxur, Circeii, and Baiae.

Domitian had probably acquired large tracts of land around Vicarello and the nearby lake to secure additional water sources. This became easier after 60 AD when the lake's level suddenly rose, flooding every lakeside villa and other infrastructure. With these new sources, Domitian probably began a new aqueduct project to supply Rome starting from the Vicarello springs. The aqueduct was later completed under Trajan as the Aqua Traiana whose remains are in the higher reaches of the stream behind the thermal baths.

After the fall of the Roman Empire, the baths suffered partial destruction, first by the Saracens and then by the Longobards. In 1692, the bath area was sold to the Roman Hungarian College, which in 1737 built the thermal baths of Bagni di Vicarello.

In the sixteenth century a hunting-lodge was built overlooking the lake and on the remains of the Roman villa/vicus by the Orsini family. It was remodelled in the 17th century by Valadier as a fine palazzo known as the Villa Valadier (or Casina or Casale).

In 1930, the management of the baths was entrusted to German nuns who managed it until 1970. After the sale of the Vicarello estate to the Vicarello Agricultural Society in 1983 the thermal baths were closed and are still abandoned. In 1989, the Agricultural Company was taken over by Vicarello Spa, an Italian company.

== The Thermal baths ==
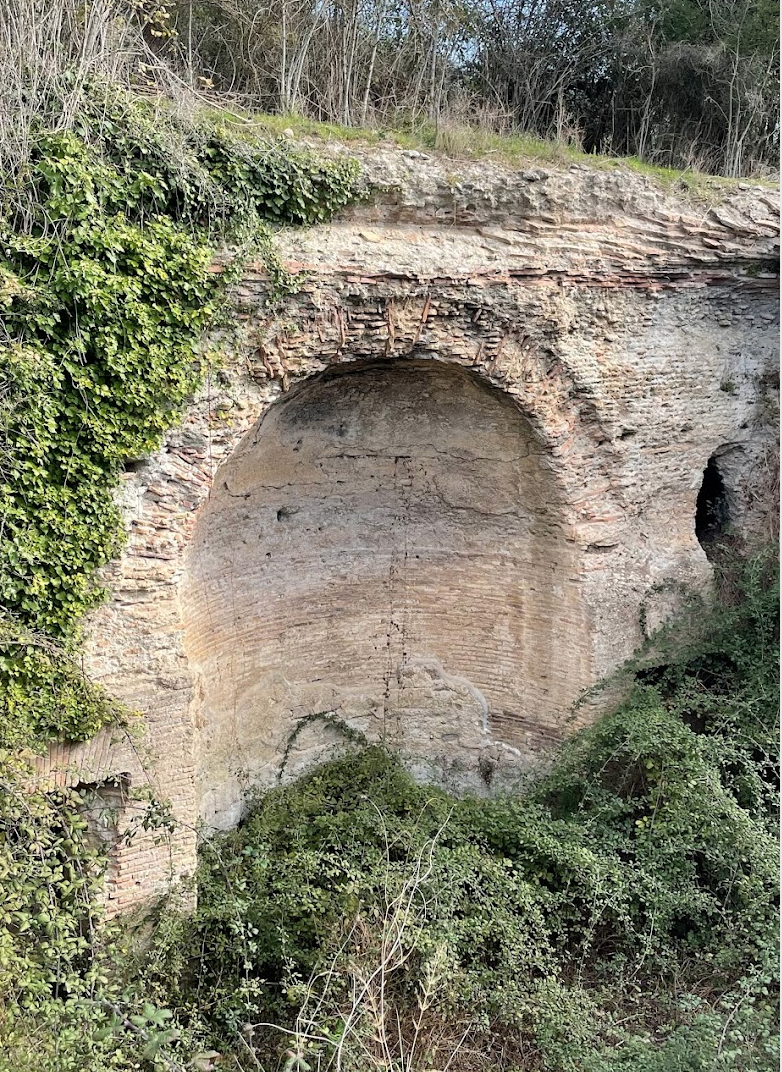
Terme Apollinari

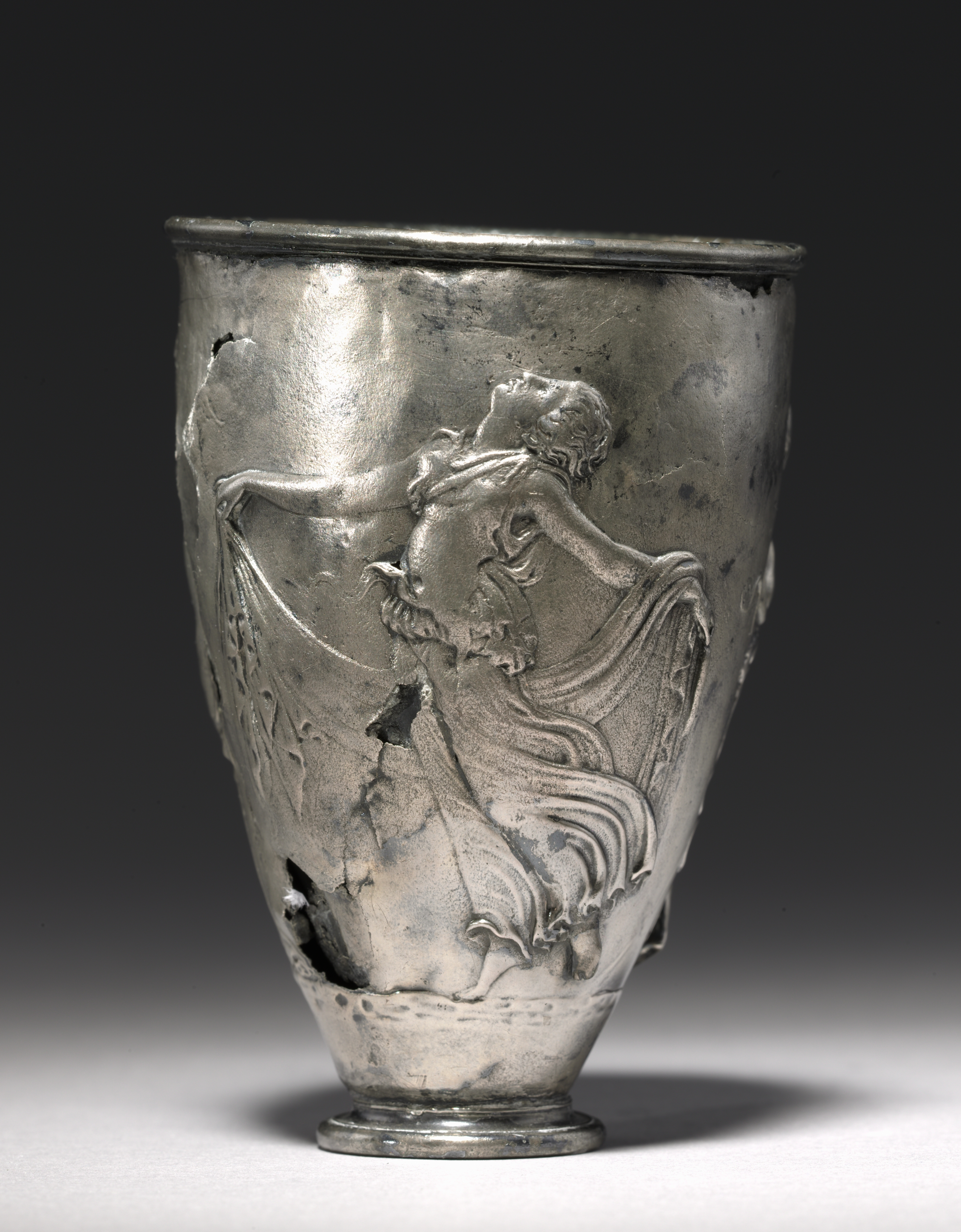
Vicarello silver goblet (Augustan period)

At the heart of the sanctuary complex is a hot spring over which a resort hotel was built in the 18th century, now abandoned, from which it still flows into the adjacent stream. The spring has a temperature of about 56°C and was known as a healing centre. It was frequented since ancient times, evidenced by the votive objects found there dating to the 7th century BC. The Romans venerated the god Apollo on this site, father of the god Aesculapius who cured diseases and who was also venerated here. In Roman times the locality was known as Aquae Apollinares, and experienced much development with the construction of the baths, roads and various buildings.

About 50 m to the east of the hot spring is a monumental baths complex with late-Flavian rooms constructed in opus latericium, probably built under Domitian and on a different alignment to the building around the spring. These baths used both hot and cold spring water to create rooms at different temperatures. The baths included a monumental nymphaeum dedicated to Apollo whose Pentelic (Greek) marble statue originally over 2 m tall and dated to the second century AD was discovered in situ, now in the Archaeological Museum of Bracciano. The nymphaeum architecture was of a magnificence characteristic of the imperial residences of the Flavians and in particular of Domitian (e.g. the palaces of Domitian on the Palatine and in Albano), with the use of large apses in a hemispherical plan.

In 1852 parts of the 18th century baths and the ancient pool were demolished for an expansion, revealing votive deposits accumulated in one of the pool's drains and recovered with difficulty from the scalding waters. It covered a span of human activity dating to Neolithic times, with much from the Iron Age and later, one of the richest votive deposits ever found in Italy. It contained some 40 gold, silver and bronze vases with dedications to Apollo, and thousands of coins ranging from the first to the fourth centuries. They included four engraved silver goblets known as the Vicarello Cups with the route between Cádiz and Rome naming inns (mansiones) along the route engraved on them. Most finds are now in the National Museum.

Parts of the ancient sanctuary and baths were excavated in the 1970s and have been left exposed.

=== Cisterns and Aqua Traiana ===
Associated with this area is one of the sources of the Aqua Traiana and traces of the aqueduct are still visible from the lake to the watershed of a stream running down the south-facing slope in the Fosso delle Ferriere ravine.

Many springs arise along the west bank of the ravine and had to be collected and brought eastward toward the baths across the stream. A map of 1789 in the State Archive in Rome shows many of the features that still exist, and that the conduit flowed along the ravine's western slope and crossed the stream on a bridge. The springs were collected in an underground vaulted building, a "springhouse", a complex structure that encloses a main gallery and feeding channels. It lies 12–15 m above the bridge on a narrow, irregular terrace against a heavily fissured cliff face which includes the springs.

The main part of the long springhouse is a vaulted chamber 41.5 m long consisting of a main gallery of 27.5 x 1.3 m fed from the south end, and to the north a channel 14.0 m long in which the cross-section contracts. At the end of the northern channel, another channel joins it with water from a rock face to the west and the total contents are fed to a steep offtake. The main source is the west wall of the main gallery where at the bottom of 13 arches built on the exposed rock face several springs issue forth. The underground arcade was replicated above ground with arches of double width covering two underground arches, but the overground structure has mainly collapsed. These were used to support the arches below and the cliff face behind, which is fragile, but also probably as a monumental feature of the aqueduct visible from the baths below.

The smaller cistern was initially fed by the springhouse 200 m away to supply the thermal baths with cold water.

To supply Domitian's new nymphaeum and also his villa to the south, the south feeder channel was probably added to the springhouse, and perhaps also the northern sources which then fed the large Porcareccia cistern ("The Pigsty") of area 10 x 40 m. Under Nerva (r. 96–98) and then Trajan (r. 98–117), Domitian's plan for an aqueduct to Rome, which could not have advanced very far, was completed.

== The Roman Villa ==
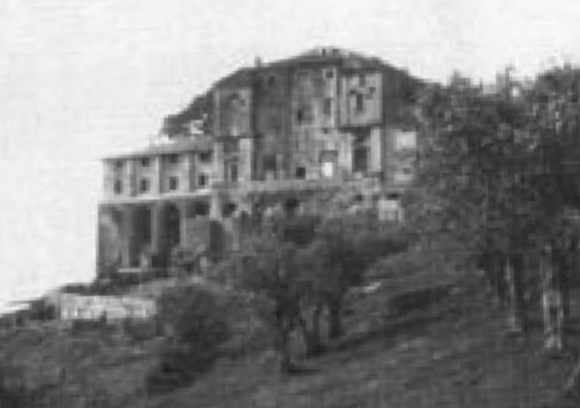
Villa Valadier (1912) showing Roman cryptoporticus

Two large elaborate Republican villas were nearby on the lake shore but had been partly submerged after 60 AD, and after he acquired much of the land Domitian built his new villa on parts of these with the main centre on the most prominent position.

The large Roman villa was built on a massive eleven-arched cryptoporticus supporting a platform now beneath the Villa Valadier. It had an agricultural area with warehouses and an olive oil mill. It was connected to the Baths at Aquae Apollinaris by a paved road.

In 1912 excavations of the underlying Roman building at Villa Valadier were photographed by Thomas Ashby.
