= Villa of Domitian, Sabaudia =

Roman villa in Sabaudia, Italy

Villa of Domitian in Sabaudia
- Villa di Domiziano al Circeo
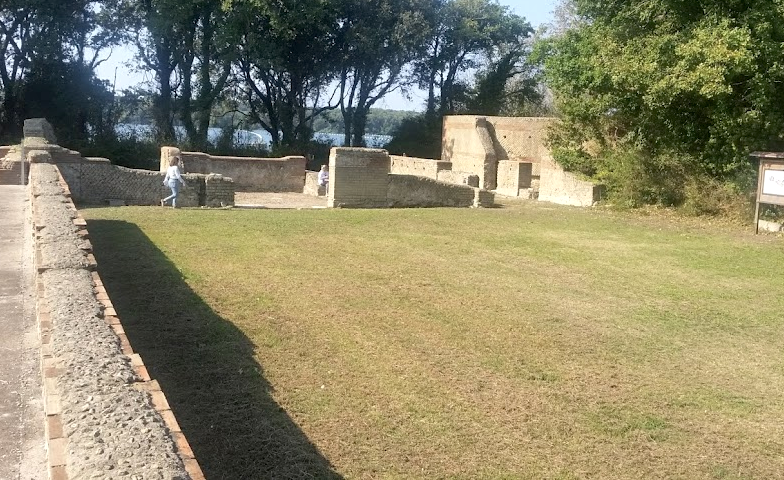
- The peristyle
- Interactive map of Villa of Domitian in Sabaudia
- 41°16′06″N 13°02′22″E
- Periods: Roman Imperial
- Cultures: Roman
- Location: Sabaudia, Italy
- Region: Lazio

Site notes
- Condition: Ruined
- Owner: Public
- Public access: On request. Visible from the exterior boundary.

The ancient Roman Villa of Domitian (Italian: Villa di Domiziano) is located on the shore of the lagoon of Paola (Lake Sabaudia) between Sabaudia and San Felice Circeo, Italy, at a locality known as Palazzo. It was one of the palaces that belonged to the emperor Domitian, and which he called his villa "at Circeii". It is considered one of the most important yet little-known Roman imperial residences in Latium.

The enormous estate occupies a beautiful site over almost an entire peninsula of 45 hectares, mostly unexcavated and a protected area in the Circeo National Park. The site was referred to in some verses by Martial. It was near to the ancient city of Circeii.

== History ==
The earliest villa here was built in the late-Republican and Augustan eras. It is likely that it was the villa of the Triumvir Lepidus to which he was exiled in 36 BC in the 2nd Triumvirate until his death, after a dispute with Octavian.

The villa was greatly expanded and enhanced by Domitian (r. 81-96 AD). It was one of his numerous villas in Italy including those at Castel Gandolfo, Tusculum, Antium, Caieta, Anxur, Vicarello and Baiae.

Domitian conducted state business here, as at Rome and at his Alban villa, as shown be the Lex Irnitana from Spain which has the words recitatae Circeiis (dictated at Circeii) added by Domitian and dated October 91. Martial refers to the villa as the place where mistresses were summoned by Domitian.

=== Excavations ===
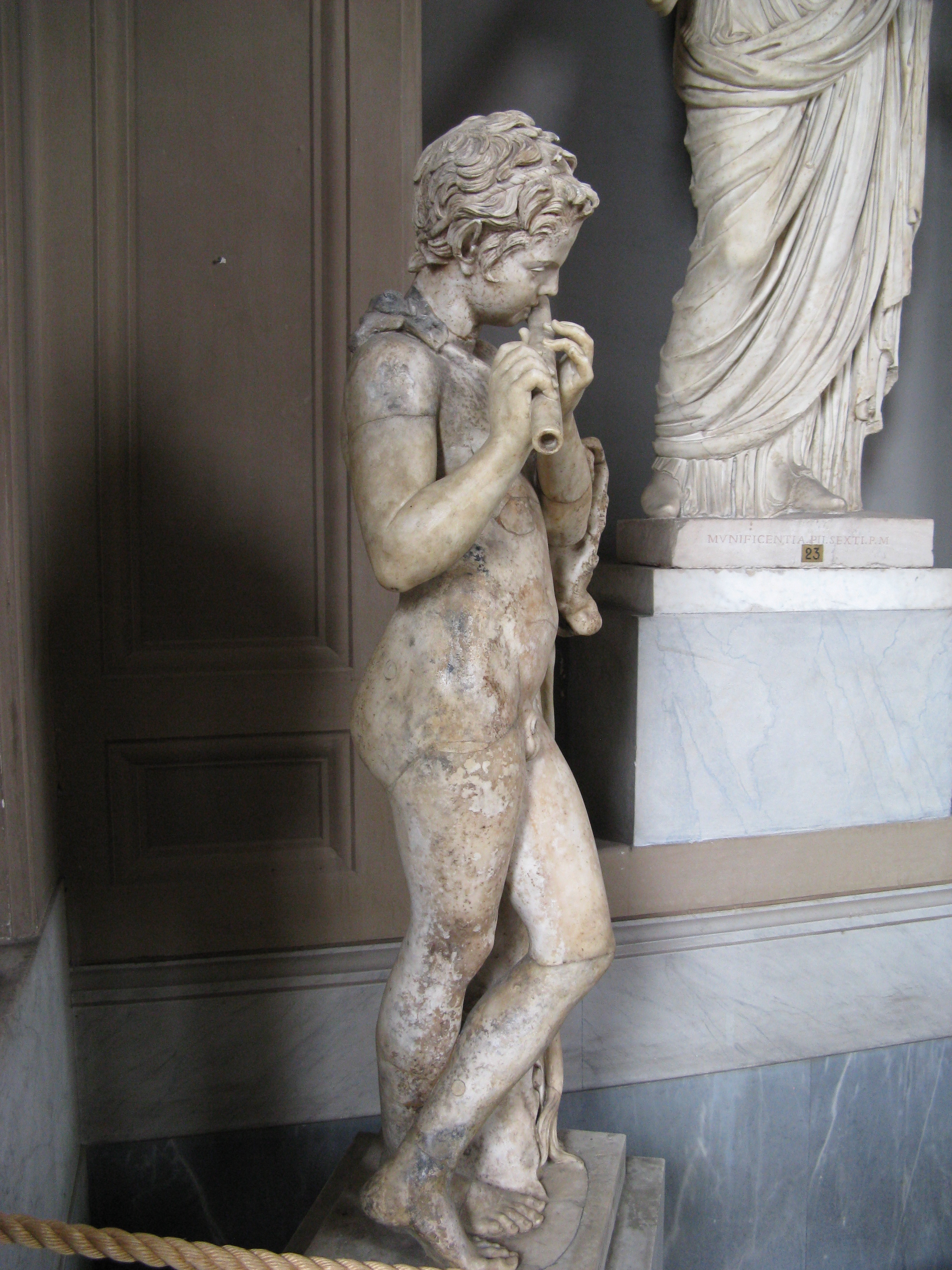
Flute player from Sabaudia (Vatican Museums)

The first recorded excavations were by Cardinal Collicola between 1720 and 1728 under pope Innocent XIII (1721–1724). The policy of the Barberini family was to build at the expense of ancient monuments by robbing their building material to build the docks of the canal and other buildings. An army of convicts was used to knock down walls and prepare building material, while porters transported them to the work site at lake Paola. Even marble was removed from floors. This systematic destruction took place not only in the Villa of Domitian, but also in the area of the port-canal of Circeii, on the Via Severiana, where almost all the tombs were razed to the ground, and in the villas around the present Casarini ruins. The most valuable objects, meanwhile, were sold to the noble villas of Rome and to the Vatican. They then ended up on the antiques market of the time and marbles and statues were divided into many museums, among which was the important statue of the so-called Apollo Kassel (now in a Kassel museum) after passing through the Conti collection and bought in 1777 by Landgraf Friedrich II. Another mission by the Papal States in 1798 undertaken by Petrini had the aim of looting works of art for profit and led to the discovery of about 29 statues including the Vatican Faun.

Pio Capponi, inspector of monuments from 1877 to 1891, witnessed the habit of the tenants of the villa, which was leased by the Municipality of Terracina, of carrying out "frequent excavations" among which Gregorio Antonelli, elder brother of Pius IX's Secretary of State, stands out and about whom La Blanchére writes: “... Antonelli exploited the immense ruins of Paola as a mine of art objects to be sold".

The first official excavations were made by Pio Capponi around 1901. The first identification of the villa as an imperial villa belonging to Domitian was by La Blanchere who did not publish it. In 1934 Jacopi excavated the southern area and found brick stamps from the Domitian's reign (r. 81-96 AD), but found little else to catalogue.

From 2010 new excavations by La Sapienza university determined the layout and decoration of the area on the lake shore.

== The site ==
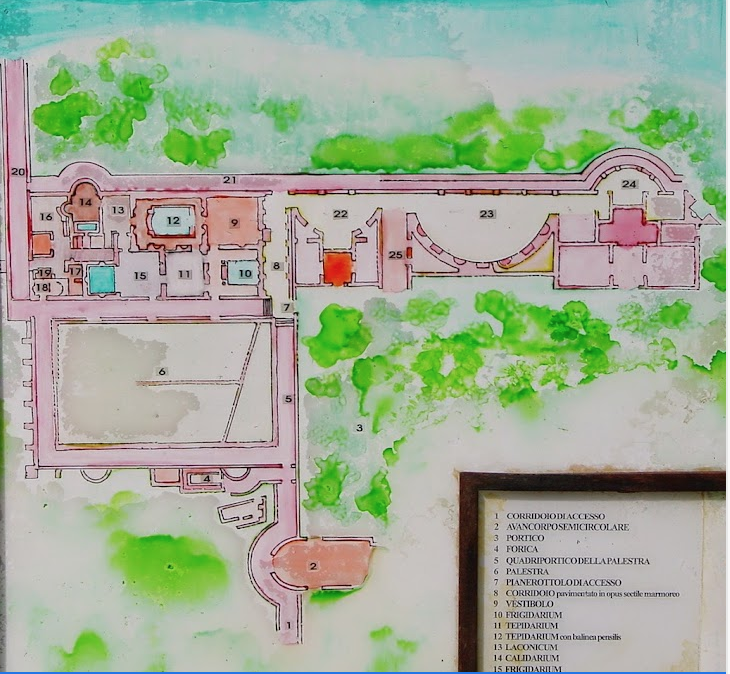
Exedra Baths area

Aerial photographs show that the area was densely built-up. Today, due to dumps of earth from early excavations and the extensive planting of pine trees in the 1940s which are endangering the surviving ruins of the villa underground with their roots and on the surface, only three parts of the villa are visible:

- the area of the “Exedra baths”, situated along the south-western side of the peninsula,
- the area of the so-called “apsidal basin” at the north-western tip
- the central zone with cisterns for collection and distribution of water.

=== The baths area ===
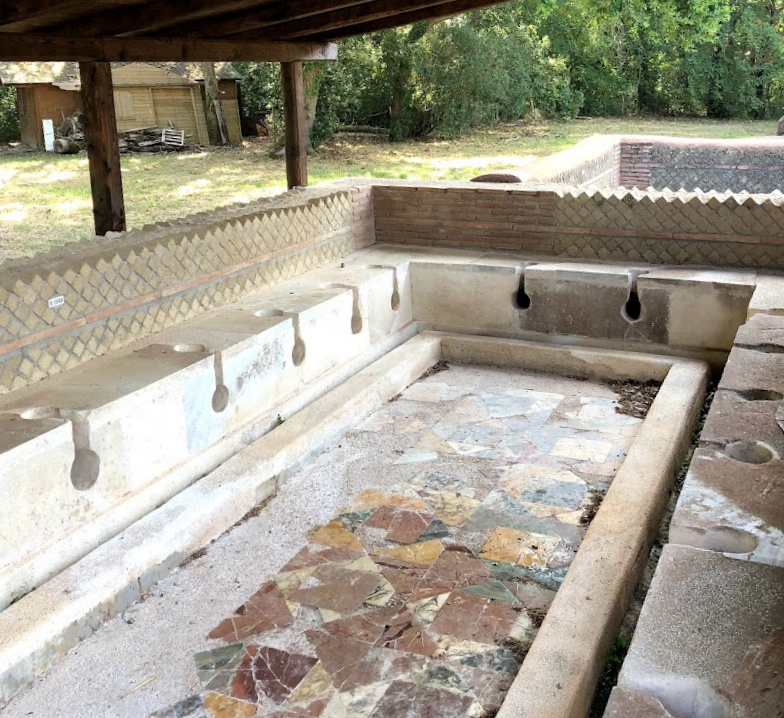
Latrine of baths

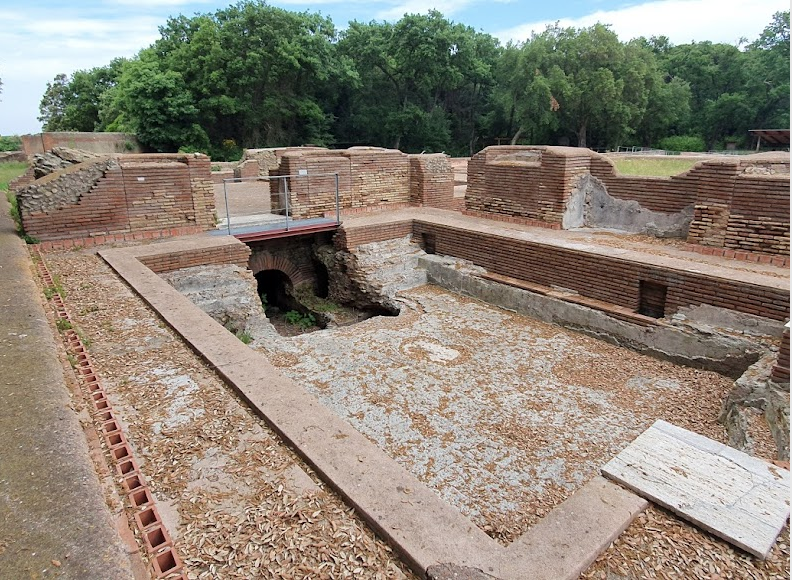
Hot pool of the baths

The baths building has an imposing façade along the western shore of the peninsula with grandiose quays, interrupted only by two porticoed exedras near the thermal baths. The baths is a series of intercommunicating rooms, joined by two corridors, in the typical calidarium-tepidarium-frigidarium arrangement to form a compact block with all the other rooms, including a vast rectangular gymnasium, the perimeter of which is defined by a portico covered in marble opus spicatum. The corridor at the NW corner of the palaestra leads to a stairway, allowing access from the NW to the exedras and, immediately to the south, through another stairway, to the baths. A porticoed passage linked the front of the baths on the lake with the exedras. The latter consisted of three rooms with a semicircular plan, two of which faced the lake.

=== The apsidal basin area ===
To the north of the peninsula is the area of the apsidal basin below which most of the late-republican villa’s structures are located. Here, Domitian's architects showed their supreme ingenuity by integrating the earlier monumental structures into the new sumptuous palace.

It included a peristyle garden whose colonnaded facade overlooked the lake. It was decorated with frescoes and monochrome white floor mosaics with black borders, behind the north-eastern part of the portico bordering the late Republican fish pond.

The key to the Domitian reorganisation was the construction of a U-shaped portico around the older parts. A corridor with two naves was created near the north edge of the portico, which marked the change in elevation and defined the limit of the service area, where northwest of this corridor, were a number of rooms used as workshops. On the eastern side is a modest atrium domus, perhaps the residence of the palace manager.

=== The central zone ===
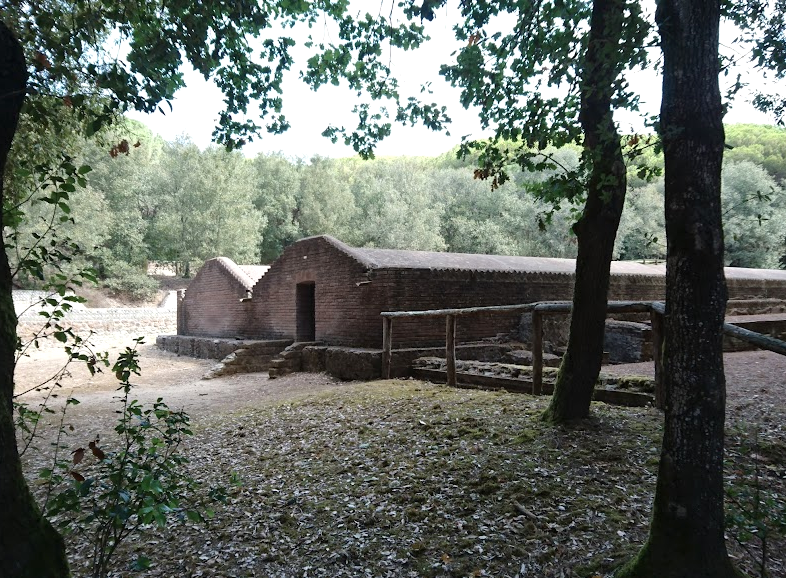
The cisterns

The central zone includes part of the villa’s agricultural buildings, with a fullonica (a fuller's) and a water supply system with large cisterns that re-used earlier ones. The villa's location far from springs needed the creation of a vast and complex water supply system for daily needs over a long dry season. The system was fed by an older aqueduct and inherited the design from the previous late-republican villa. The water that reached the villa was stored in the great "Cisterna Maggiore" and carried to the central area of the complex where the smaller "Cisterna dell'Eco" and "Cisterna di Garanzia" were located in the highest area in the entire peninsula, ideal for storage and subsequent distribution.
