= Circeii =

Ancient Roman city

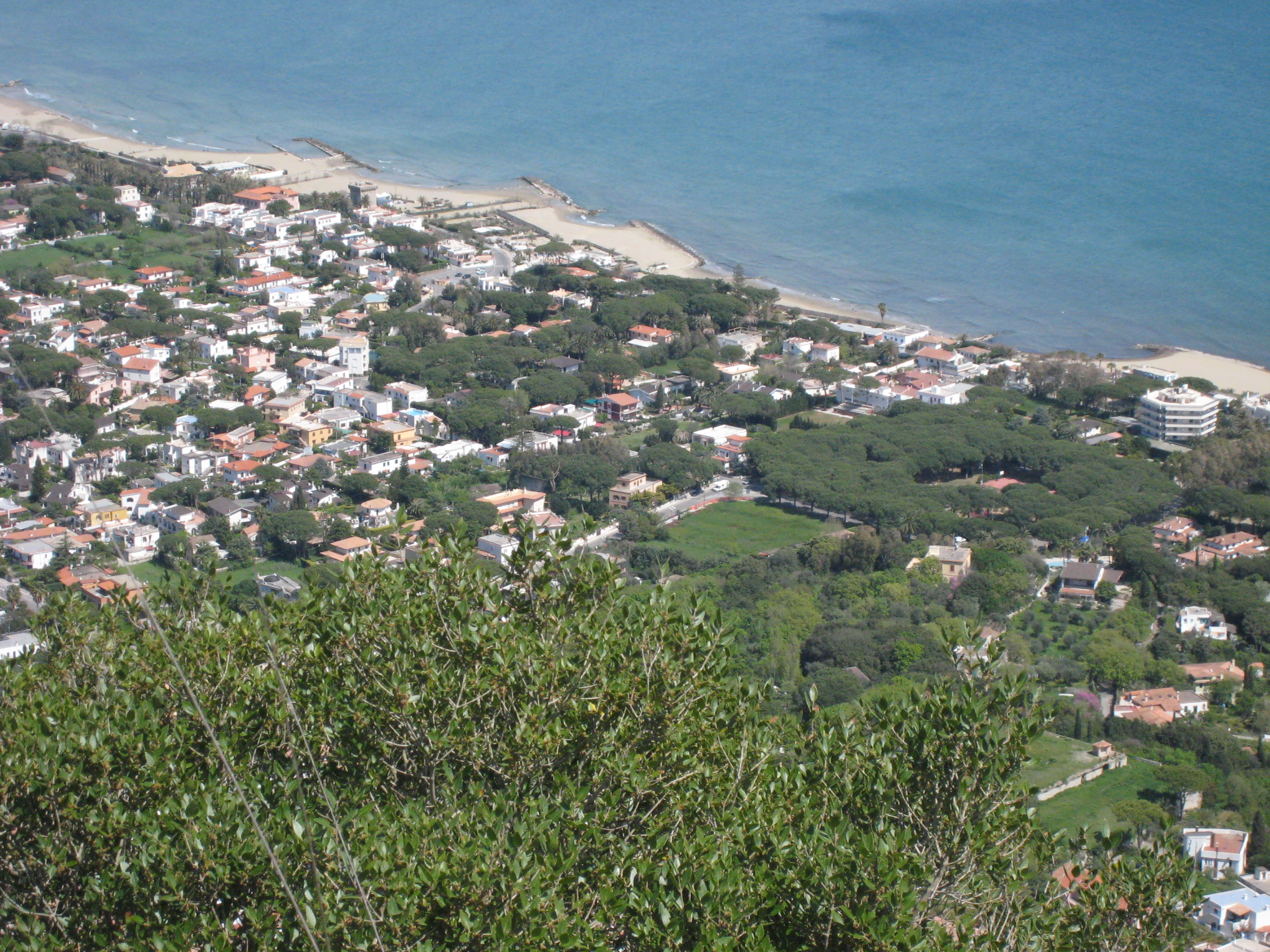
View of San Felice Circeo from Mount Circeo

Circeii was an ancient Roman city on the site of modern San Felice Circeo and near Mount Circeo, the mountain promontory on the southwest coast of Italy. The area around Circeii and Mount Circeo was thickly populated with Roman villas and other buildings, of which the remains of many can still be seen.

The origin of the name is uncertain: it has naturally been connected with Homer's legend of Circe. The difficulty has been raised that the promontory ceased to be an island well before Homer's time; but Procopius remarked that the promontory has all the appearance of an island until one is actually upon it.

== History ==
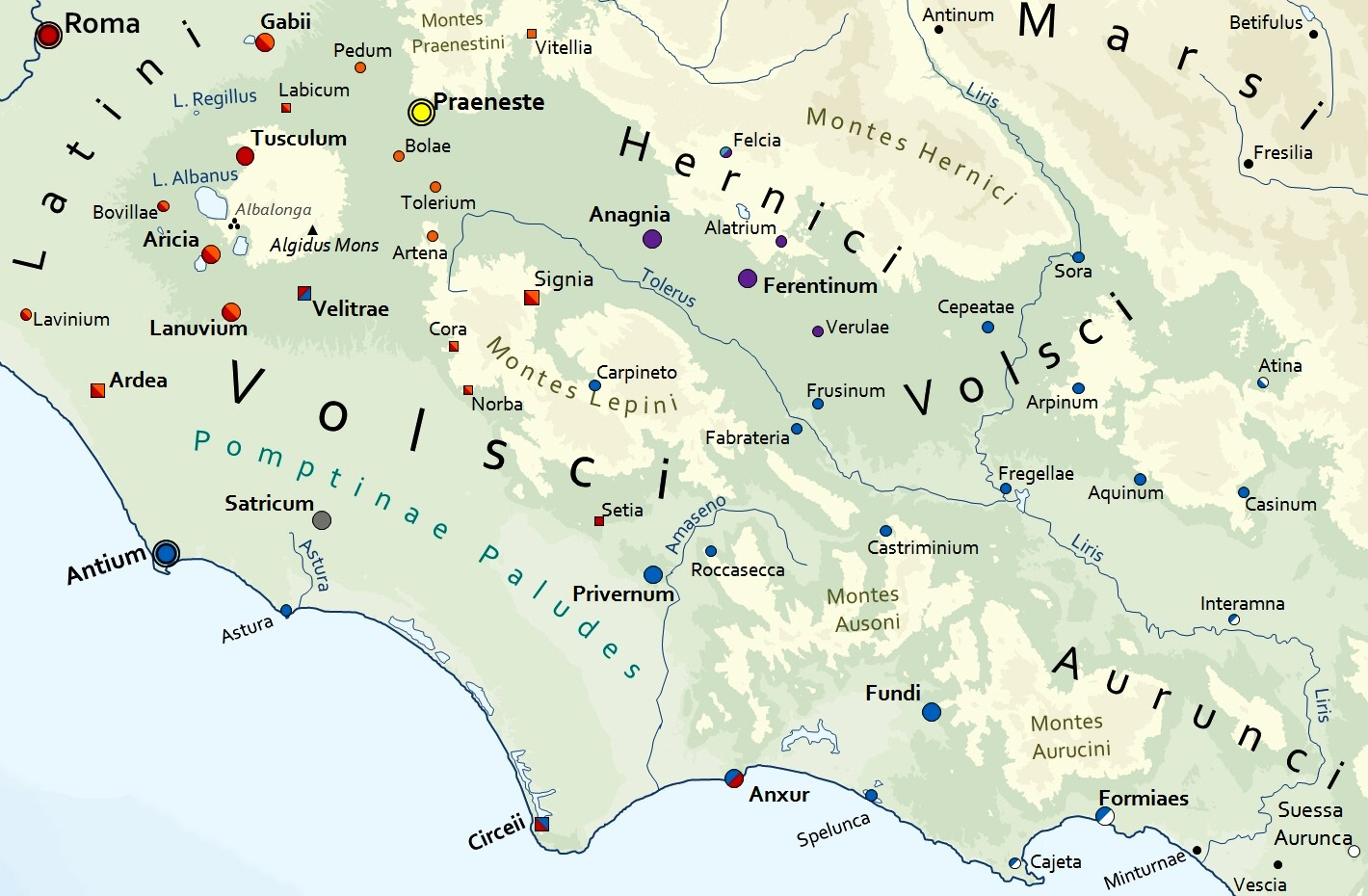
Latin tribes 5th c. BC

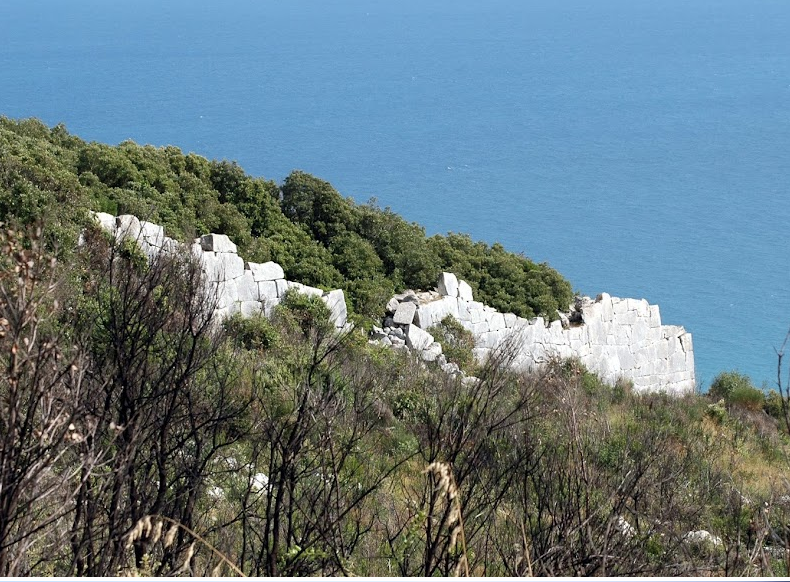
Acropolis of Circeii

The town on the eastern side of Monte Circeo was probably founded by Greeks at the end of the Bronze Age, when they established ports and emporiums along the Italian coast.

At the east end of the promontory ridge are the remains of Bronze Age cyclopean walls that roughly form a rectangle of 200 by 100 metres. It seems to have been an acropolis and contains only a subterranean cistern with a beehive roof of converging blocks. The megalithic blocks are cut and assembled precisely together using tight polygonal joints without mortar. Many walls of this type were built during the Bronze Age in the Mediterranean, for example in Lazio those of Segni, Ferentino, Norba and Arpinum, possibly by the Aurunci people of the area. The blocks of the inner face are much less carefully worked both here and at Arpinum.

The Roman colony of Circeii was founded in the time of Roman king Tarquinius Superbus (before 495 BC).

=== Roman Republic ===
The Roman colonists were expelled by the Volsci during the Volscian invasion led by Coriolanus in 491-488 BC. Circeii was reconquered by the Romans in about 393 BC three years before the Gaulish War. Not long afterwards the Circeians revolted, and joined the Volscians again. Nevertheless in Rome's treaty with Carthage in 348 BC Circeii is stated as under Roman protection.

They must have succeeded in establishing their independence as at the start of the second Latin War in 340 BC Circeii was a member of the Latin League. After the war it must have been recolonised by the Romans, because in the Second Punic War it was among their thirty Latin colonies. But in 209 BC, during the Second Punic War, Circeii was one of twelve colonies to refuse any more military contributions towards Rome and in 204 it was punished as a result, by supplying double the greatest number of foot soldiers they had ever provided and 120 horsemen, all chosen from the wealthiest citizens, and to be sent out of Italy. Also an annual tax was imposed.

The town only acquired municipal rights after the Social War and was unimportant except as a seaside resort.

In the 2nd Triumvirate, after a dispute between Lepidus and Octavian, Lepidus was forced into exile in Circeii in 36 BC.

It became an agreeable place of retirement for wealthy Romans under the later Republic and the Empire, and the emperors Tiberius and Domitian had villas nearby.

It was renowned for the quantity and quality of its oysters by the Romans.

=== Roman Empire ===
At the end of the republic or at latest at the beginning of the imperial period, the city of Circeii was connected to a harbour on the west side of the promontory on the shore of the Lago di Paola (a lagoon, now a considerable fishery) separated from the sea by a line of sand-dunes and connected with it by a Roman channel: Strabo speaks of the city as a small harbour 1.5 kilometres (0.93 mi) north of the west end of the promontory.

== The Roman Sites ==
The more modern town of San Felice Circeo seems to occupy the site of the ancient city; its mediaeval walls rest upon ancient Cyclopean walls of less careful construction than those of the acropolis, and enclose an area that measures 200 by 150 m (660 by 490 ft). Along with the acropolis on the east end of the mountain, the highest summit of the promontory has ruins of a platform attributed to a temple of Venus or Circe.

This coastal area became popular with rich Romans, like nearby coasts, for the location of large, luxurious villas. On the east end of the promontory stand the remains of several very large ancient villas which Cicero compared to those at Antium.

North of the city on the Lago di Paola near Sabaudia emperor Domitian built a sumptuous villa extending over a vast area. Along the lagoon were fine buildings, including a large open piscina or basin, surrounded by a double portico, while farther inland are several very large and well-preserved cisterns supplied by an aqueduct of which traces may still be seen.

An ancient inscription found near Torre Paola speaks of an amphitheatre, of which no remains are visible. Another inscription in the rock near San Felice speaks about this part of the Latin: promonturium Veneris ("promontory of Venus"; the only case of the use of this name) as belonging to the city of Circeii.

=== The so-called villa of the Four Winds ===
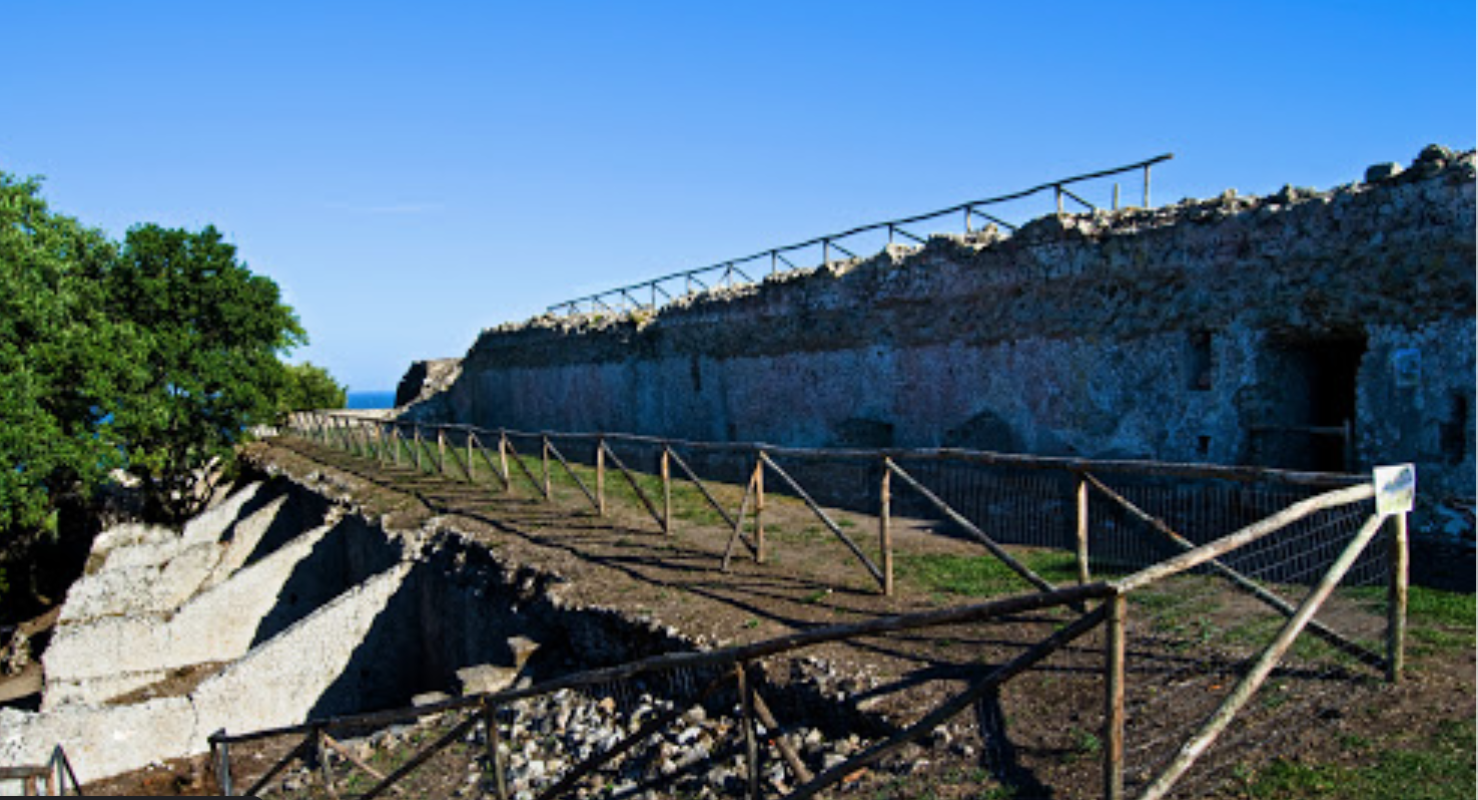
Sanctuary of Venus, or villa of the Four Winds, Circeii

Known as the villa dei Quattro Venti, the remains of this large building in the historic centre of San Felice lie along the road that leads to the port. Majestic in size, approximately 8,000 m^{2} area and including three terraces, it was long thought to be a great villa owned by Lepidus. It is now thought more likely to be a sanctuary according to recent studies by Sapienza University (with the support of the Circeo National Park and the Superintendency of Archaeological Heritage of Lazio) after discovery of a votive inscription, a dedication addressed to a divinity. The sanctuary is probably from the Sullan period (starting from 83 BC) and follows the building project, revolutionary for the time, of a sanctuary dedicated to Venus, protector of the fortune of the new dictator, Sulla, a new cult intended to overshadow the older divinity. The building also fits the picture of the great Republican sanctuaries of Lazio, such as those of Anxur and Praeneste built between the middle of the 2nd and the middle of the 1st century BC in scenic and dominant positions, on imposing terraced substructures.

The new building technique of concrete is used, as recently invented in Rome, with the architectural orders derived from the Hellenistic tradition. The model for the scenographic arrangement on sloping terraces may refer to the great sanctuaries of the city of Pergamum where the temples stand on high podiums and lack a colonnade at the back. The terraces are often surrounded by porticoes on three sides and the arches and vaults are often flanked or hidden by colonnades.

=== The Roman port-canal ===
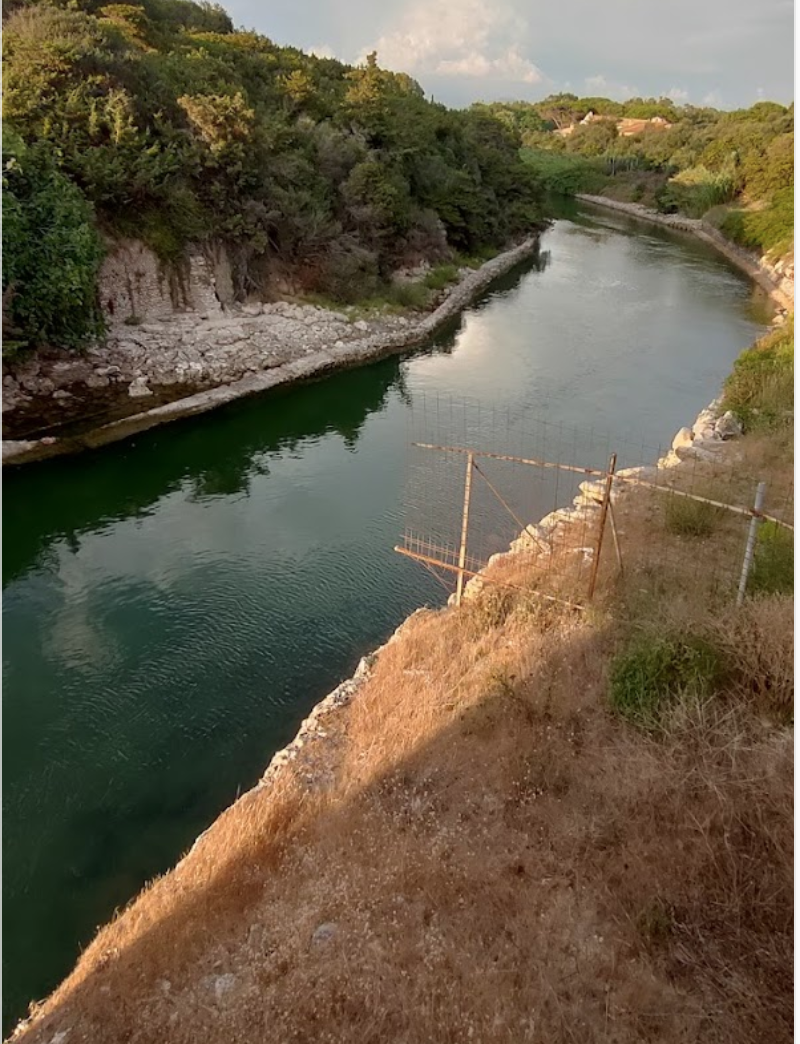
Roman harbour canal, Cerceii

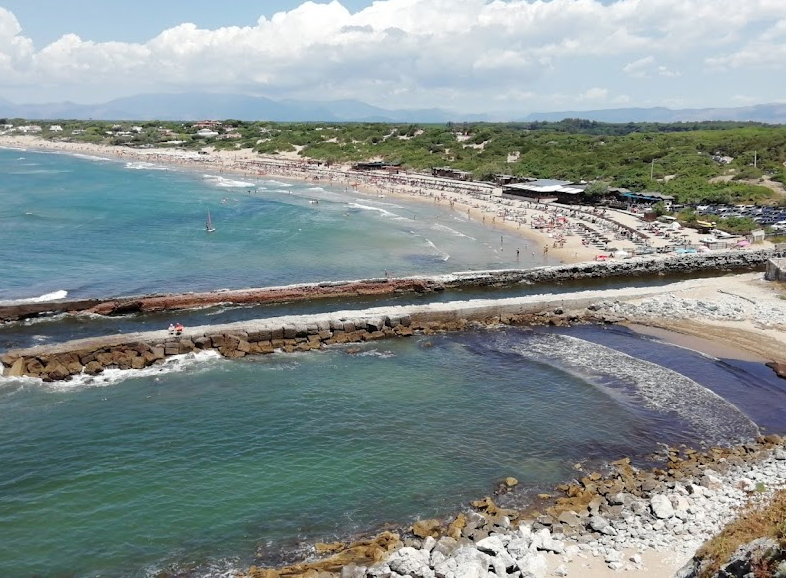
Roman canal mole and harbour

Also called the Fossa Augusta, Fossa Neronis or Cavo d'Augusto, it is a Roman canal that connected the South East side of Lake Paola to the Tyrrhenian Sea by crossing the plain at the foot of the promontory to avoid dangerous circumnavigation of Monte Circeo.

The section near the mouth of Rio Torto was described by Giuseppe Lugli in the 1920s as: "The width of the navigable body of water must have been about 18 m and depth of 4 m; on the sides there were docks for passing of ships and on the banks ran two parallel roads for towing by animals...". The Fossa Augusta begins near the area called Casarini, just south of the mediaeval convent and inside the Selva Piana a shallow ditch is clearly visible. The structure is easily identifiable in the Mola-la Cona stretch, which still retains the side roads, the current Via Giuseppe Verdi and Via Sabaudia. The outlet to the sea at Rio Torto is through a manhole below via Gibraleon.

Historically the start of the canal was attributed to the emperor Nero (r. 54-68 AD) who began work on a 160-mile-long canal to join Ostia to Lake Avernus, traces of which remain between the lakes of Caprolace and Paola. Archaeological finds show that the port-canal was originally built in the Sullan period of about 91-88 BC by Lucius Faberius Murena, magistrate of Circei, to whom an inscription is dedicated. Lucius Faberius belonged to the important Faberii family in Rome, especially in the first century BC. Another stone description affirms the high offices and industriousness held by Lucius Faberius in Rome.

The canal was judged by Suetonius and Tacitus to be the most outrageous undertaking of Nero, and it was not completed, perhaps due to the sudden death of the emperor or due to the technical difficulties in its construction. Suetonius and Strabo describe a canal port already present at the end of the 1st century BC. The completion of the canal is assumed to be the work of Domitian associated with his nearby palace, as evidenced by similar brick stamps.

There is at least one other, shorter, and well-preserved Roman canal at the west end, close to the base of Monte Circeo and linking Lake Paola with the sea, called the harbour canal or canal of Torre Paola. It was most likely built by Domitian to connect his palace to the sea. This canal is still used and is about 1 km long with walls of opus caementicium faced with opus reticulatum, opus latericium and opus mixtum. At the seaward mouth of the canal, the walls still extend into the sea by 60–100 m and here Domitian built a small harbour south of the canal.

== Nearby Roman sites ==
The area around Monte Circeo was populated with many Roman villas and other buildings, remains of which can often still be seen.

=== Villa of Domitian ===
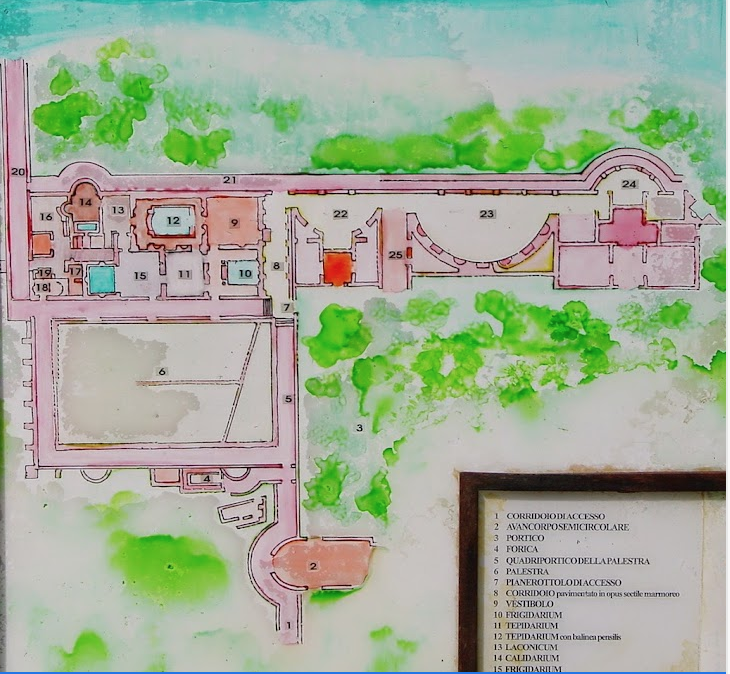
Plan of part of the Villa of Domitian, Sabaudia

The enormous villa or palace dates from the 1st century AD and extends for over 45 hectares along the shores of Lake Sabaudia.

Excavations in 1934 revealed brick stamps from the Domitian (r. 81-96 AD) era and the site was referred to in some verses by Martial. It is probable that the villa was only renovated in that period, as there are remains from the time of Augustus. A lot of material had ended up on the antiques market of the time and marbles and statues were divided into many museums, among which are the Apollo Kassel (now in a Kassel museum) and a satyr (now in the Vatican Museums).

=== "Casarina" site (baths) ===
"La Casarina" is located on a peninsula at the south end of Lake Sabaudia. It was most likely a public bathing complex from the end of the 1st century BC. The docks, the cistern and the pools date to the first phase; in the 2nd phase, perhaps in the Domitian era, the small elliptical building was added. The complex was most likely abandoned in the 13th century.

=== So-called spring of Lucullus ===
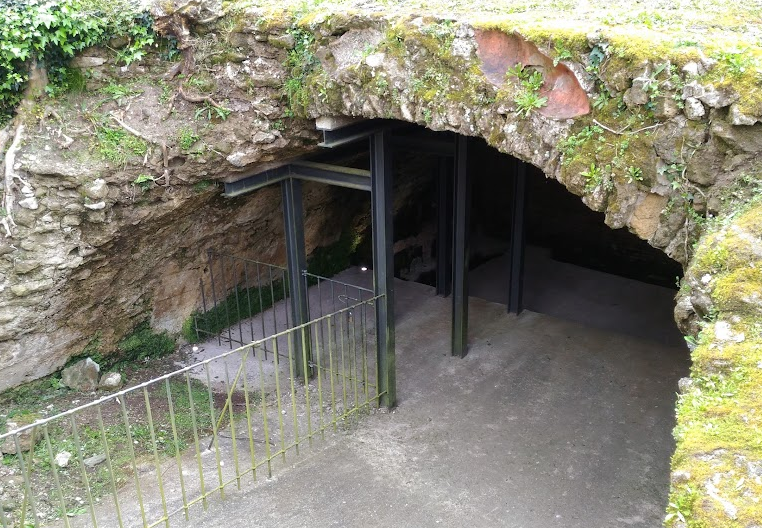
Spring of Lucullus

The Fonte di Lucullo (spring of Lucullus) is a Roman artificial cave built as a water cistern. It is located within the Circeo National Park in Molella, halfway between Sabaudia and San Felice Circeo. The spring, formerly known as Bagnara, is now given the name of the rich patrician Lucullus who had many elaborate villas and, in 78 BC, entrusted Gnaeus Domitius Amandus (according to a brick stamp) with the task of collecting the waters of that area. The builder created two sources of water, for drinking and for baths with less clean water. It was near a republican villa that was visible until about 70 years ago. According to legend the delightful villa on the shores of Lake Paola belonged to Lucullus, who after having exercised his military career for many years fighting valiantly and with honour, and after having accumulated much wealth, retired from public office to end his last days in the comfort on the Circeo promontory.

The spring was discovered in 1904 under 15 m of sand and still gushes inside the ancient vault.

=== So-called pool of Lucullus ===
The pool was a Roman fish farm made up of two concentric rings, divided into four unequal wedges by walls, which still exists today. The link to Lucullus is unproven.

The first phase of the pool was between the end of the republic and the early empire, the same period in which the nearby thermal baths of Torre Paola were built which perhaps shared the supply. This date offers further evidence in favour of the early expansion of Circeii.

Most of the sections are inter-linked through rectangular openings at different heights. The western compartment, however, was isolated from the pool and communicated only with the supply channel from an underground sulphurous spring that gushed out at about 25 degrees and which was perhaps built in the Domitian era.
