= Wreaths and crowns in antiquity =

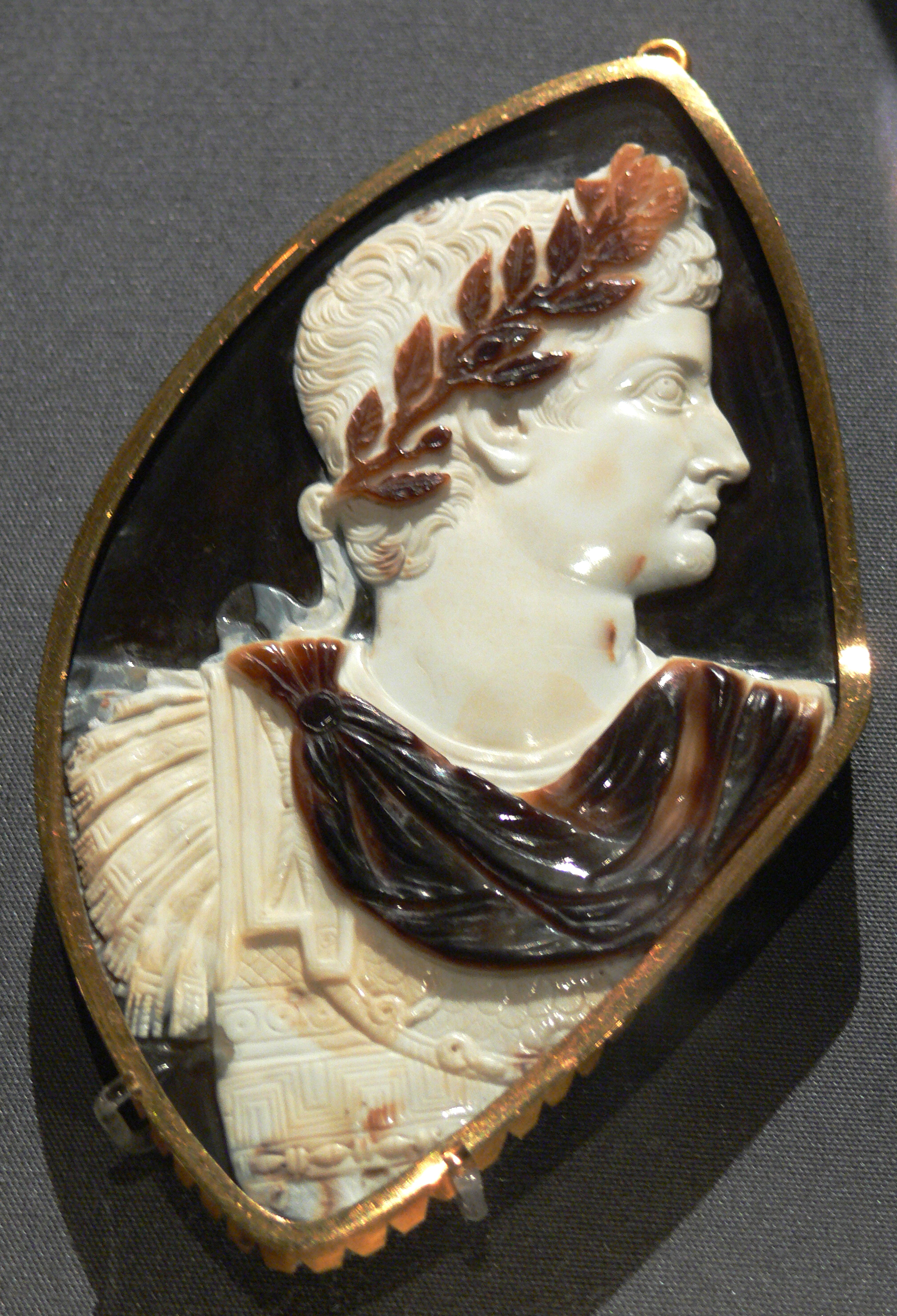
Cameo of the Roman emperor Tiberius (r. 14–37 AD) wearing a laurel wreath (Kunsthistorisches Museum)

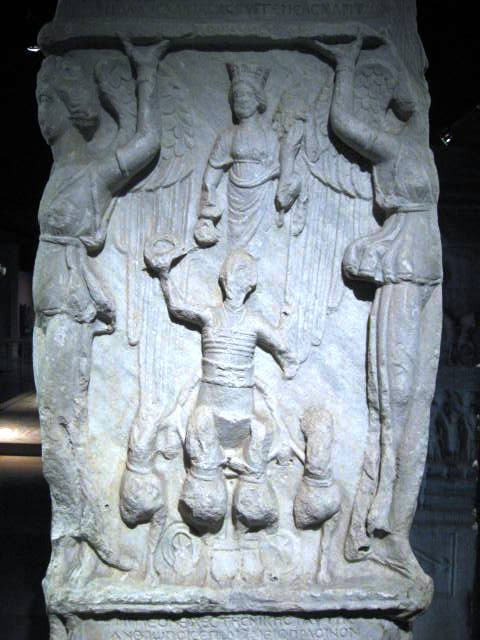
The tyche of Constantinople, wearing a corona muralis, awards Porphyrius, in his quadriga, a laurel wreath in the Hippodrome, carved on a base for a commemorative statue of the charioteer in the Hippodrome itself (Istanbul Archaeology Museums)

In classical and late antiquity wreaths or crowns (Ancient Greek: στέφανος, romanized: stéphanos, lit. 'wreath', 'crown'; Latin: corona, lit. 'wreath', 'garland', 'chaplet') usually made of vegetation or precious metals were worn on ceremonial occasions and were awarded for various achievements. The symbolism of these different types of wreaths depended on their composition; different crowns were worn and awarded for different purposes. Such wreaths or crowns were represented in classical architecture, in ancient Greek art and sculpture, and in Roman art and sculpture. As well as being awarded for merit and military conduct, they were worn by orators, priests performing sacrifices, by the chorus in ancient Greek drama, and by attendees of a symposium.

From Archaic Greece until late antiquity, wreaths were the prizes competed for at the Panhellenic Games – the Olympic, Pythian, Nemean, and Isthmian Games – the "crown games", each with a different vegetation crown awarded. In the military of ancient Rome, wreaths were among the traditional Roman military decorations; as a result of the revival in ancient artistic and literary models in the Renaissance they are frequently encountered in Western art and heraldry.

Wreaths of leaves from laurel, olive, oak, myrtle, and celery were particularly symbolically significant, with the laurel wreath the victor's crown at the Pythian Games and at a Roman triumph, and the olive wreath the prize at the Olympic Games. Symposiasts wore crowns of roses, while maenads and other followers of Dionysus wore wreaths of ivy or of vine leaves. The highest martial distinction possible in the Roman state was a wreath of grass. In Classical Greece, gold crowns were commonly sent – and recorded in inscriptions – as tribute to the renowned shrines of Delos and Athens by members of the Delian League. Until Late Antiquity, gold crowns became a tribute demanded by the Roman Empire from cities under its rule. In such cases, an actual crown was frequently never made and the nominal value was often paid in silver.

== Function ==
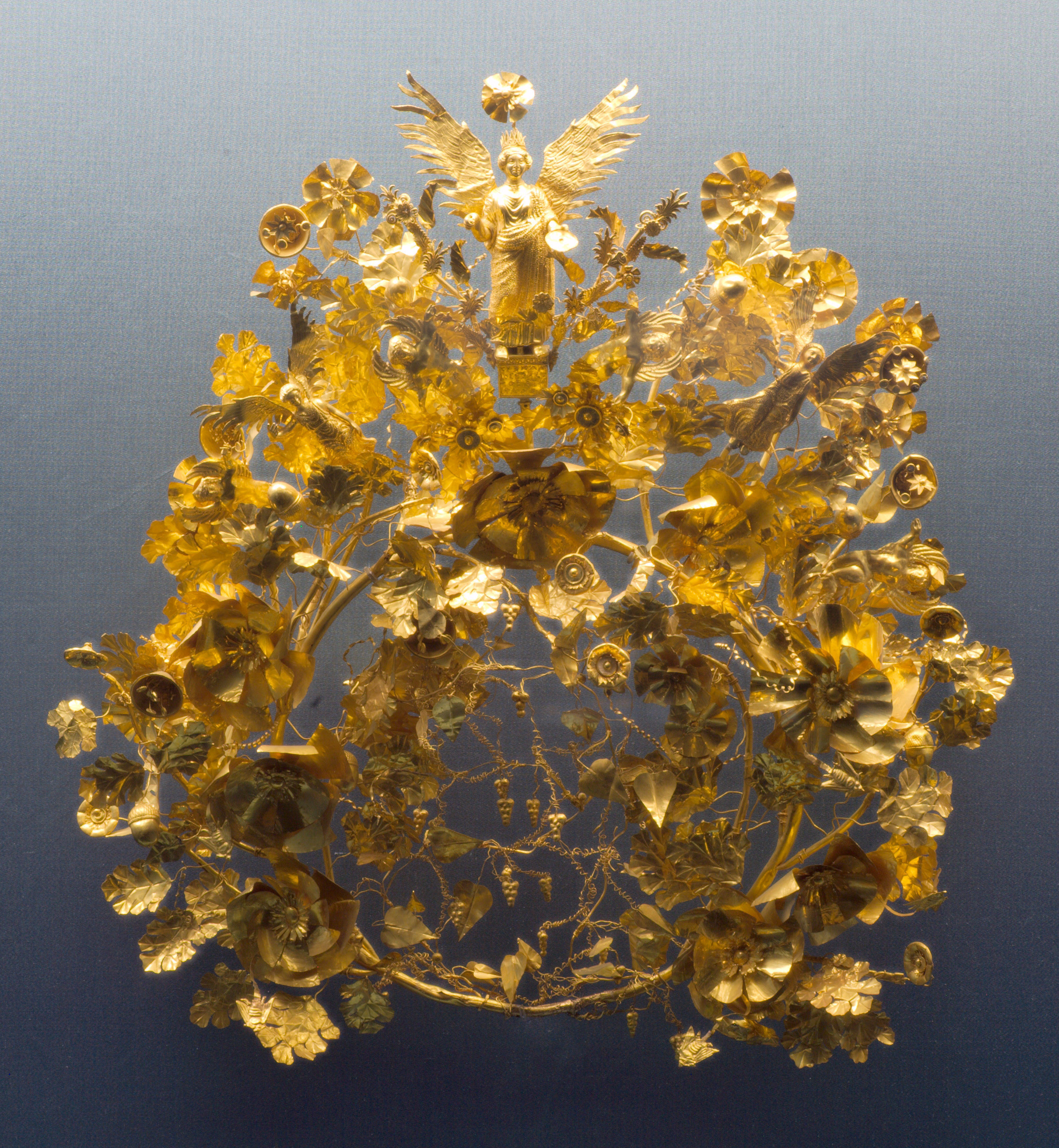
The Kritonios Crown – a 4th-century BC gold wreath from Armento, representing a crown of oak, convolvulus, narcissus, ivy, roses, and myrtle with figurines of a winged goddess and six others (Staatliche Antikensammlungen)

As can be inferred from Apuleius's The Golden Ass and Aristophanes's Plutus, to wear a wreath was a sign of distinction, and an assault on a wreath's wearer was considered especially blameworthy. According to Tertullian's De corona, the wearing of wreaths was an ancient practice. Indeed, for religious rites and cult practices to omit the wearing of wreaths was rare. Priests wore wreaths for the performance of sacrifices, as did other participants in the ceremony and the sacrificial victim. Similarly, altars, statues, and religious buildings and accoutrements could all be wreathed. Wreaths were sacred objects, and removing one and disposing of it could not be done casually or without due reverence, neither could an unauthorized person wear one without committing sacrilege.

Different wreaths were worn, depending on the god or goddess to be propitiated. Laurel wreaths were appropriate Apollo and his father Zeus (Jupiter), as well as for Aphrodite (Venus). The mother-and-daughter fertility goddesses Demeter and Persephone (Ceres and Proserpina) were honoured with crowns of ears of corn. The cult of Dionysus (Bacchus) was associated with wreaths of ivy and vines.

Besides sacrificial rituals, festival rites of marriage, birth, and death all involved wreaths. As in Catullus's Poem 61 and Apuleius's The Golden Ass, couples to be married were both wreathed on the occasion. To mark the occasion of a new birth, the household would hang a wreath of olive or wool on the door. As part of ancient funerary practice, the dead were wreathed, funerary urns were wreathed, and wreaths were laid on and within tombs. Euripides's The Trojan Women, Athenaeus's Deipnosophistae, and Pliny's Natural History all include references to the dead as wreathed, while Pliny even mentions a raven, celebrated talking as a talking bird, being awarded wreaths at its lavish funeral. Funerary monuments might be painted with wreaths as well as hung with them, and from the Hellenistic period, wreaths awarded to the deceased during a lifetime could be carved on the monument marking the grave.

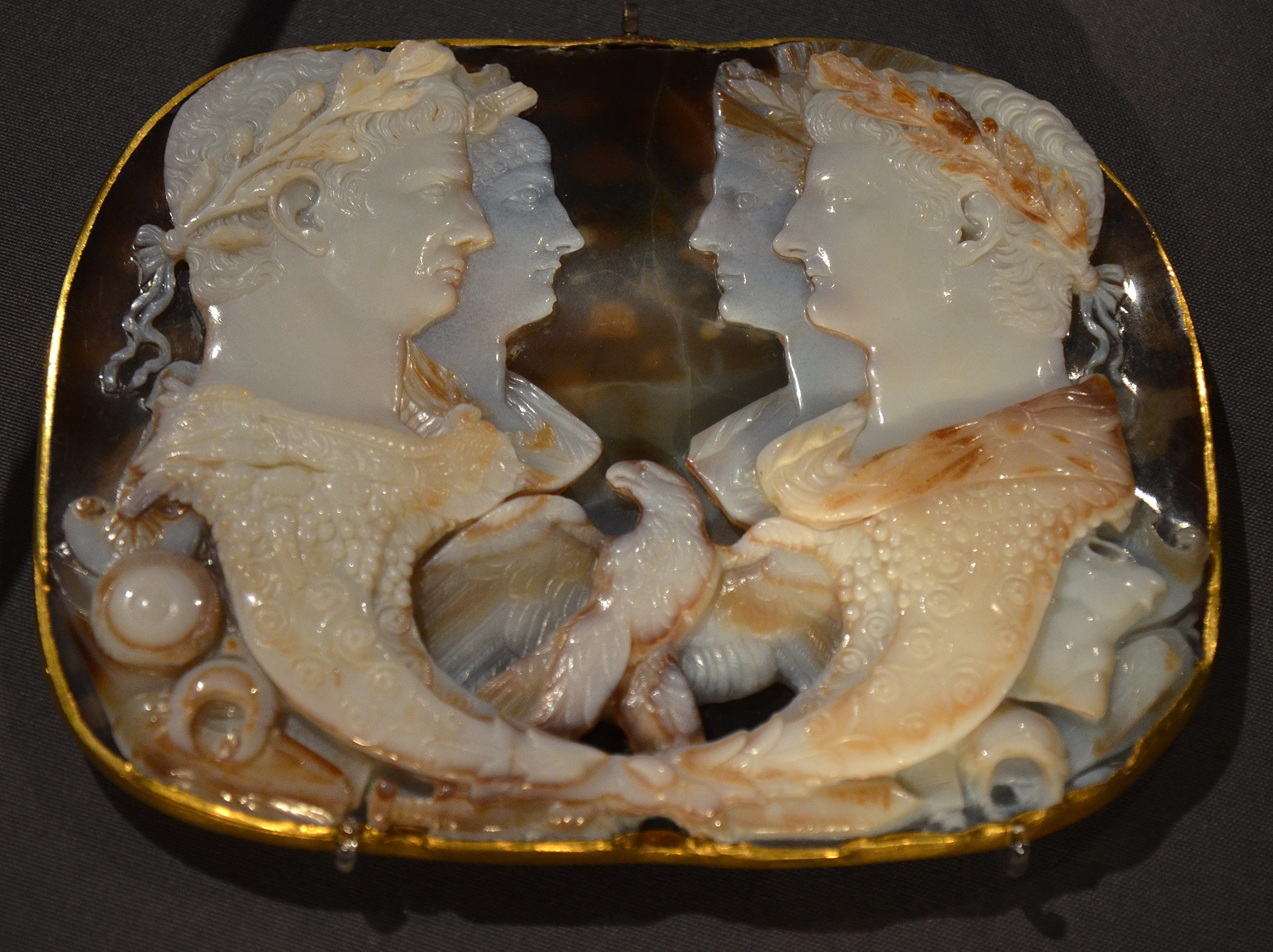
The Gemma Claudia, an onyx cameo showing the emperor Claudius (r. 41–54) wearing an oak wreath (L) and Germanicus and his wife Agrippina the Elder (R) wearing olive wreaths (Kunsthistorisches Museum)

According to the Deipnosophistae, the god Dionysus is who introduced the practice of wearing wreaths at symposia; he had worn an ivy wreath to ward off the ill-effects of drinking wine. Wreaths of roses, violets, or myrtle leaves were also appropriate to be worn by symposiasts. The vessels from which wine was distributed to the attendees were themselves wreathed. According to Petronius's Satyricon, even the hands and feet of symposiasts might be wreathed. A wreath might be left as a token of love on the door of the object of one's affections on the night-time ritual procession that followed (a komos), as in the Palatine Anthology and in the work of Theocritus.

Wreaths were also worn in preparation for war; artistic representations might show both victors and vanquished wearing wreaths. According to Herodotus's Histories, the Spartans wreathed themselves in preparation for battle. Wreaths as the prize of victory in athletic competitions were comparable to the awarding wreaths for military accomplishments, as at a Roman triumph. From the Hellenistic period onwards, wreaths had become a prestigious and established awards for merit and virtue in the polis.

Greek and Hellenistic gold funerary crowns; these are the main type to survive

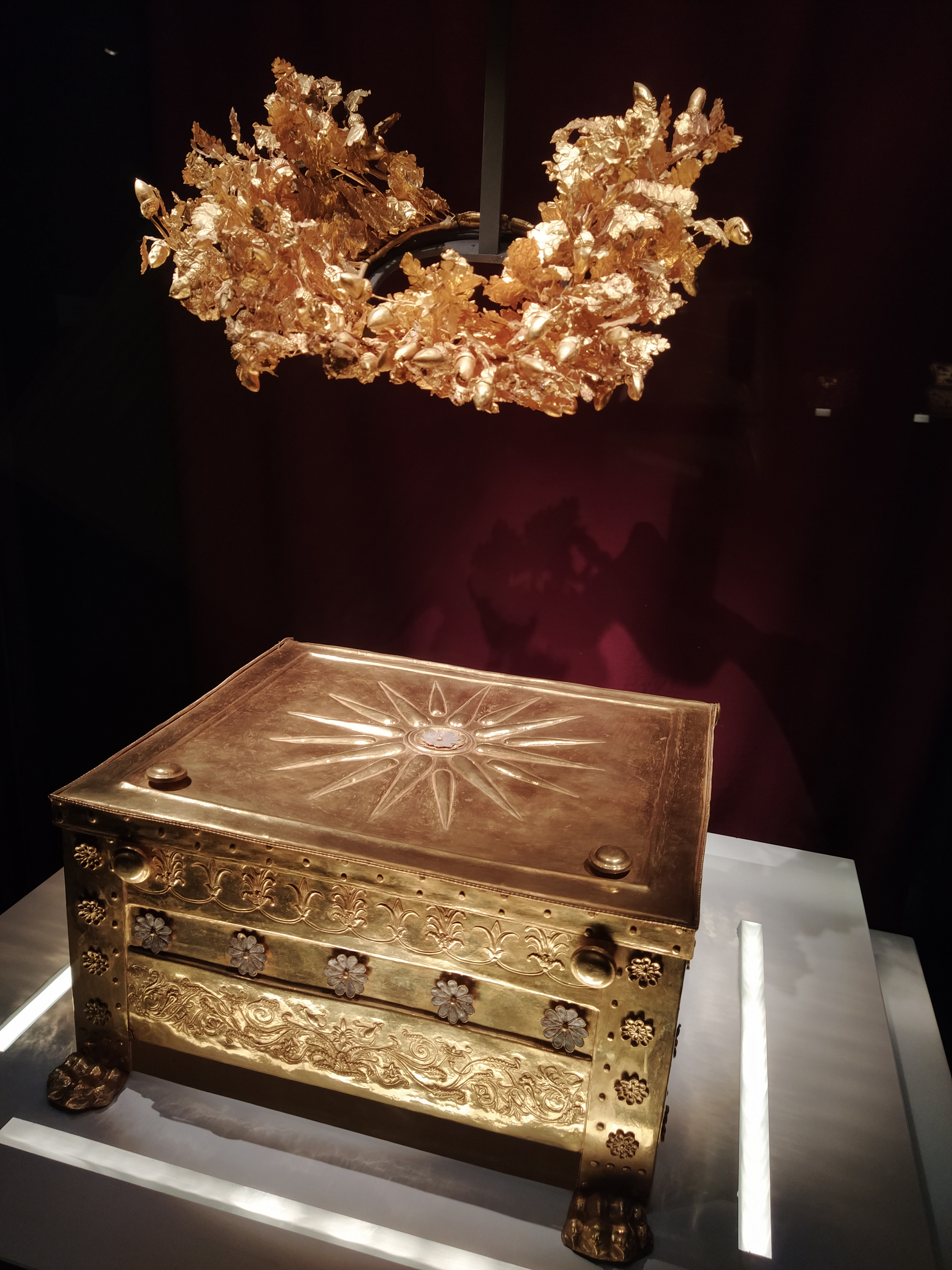
Funerary gold oak crown from the tomb of Philip II of Macedon (r. 359–336 BC) in Aegae (Vergina)

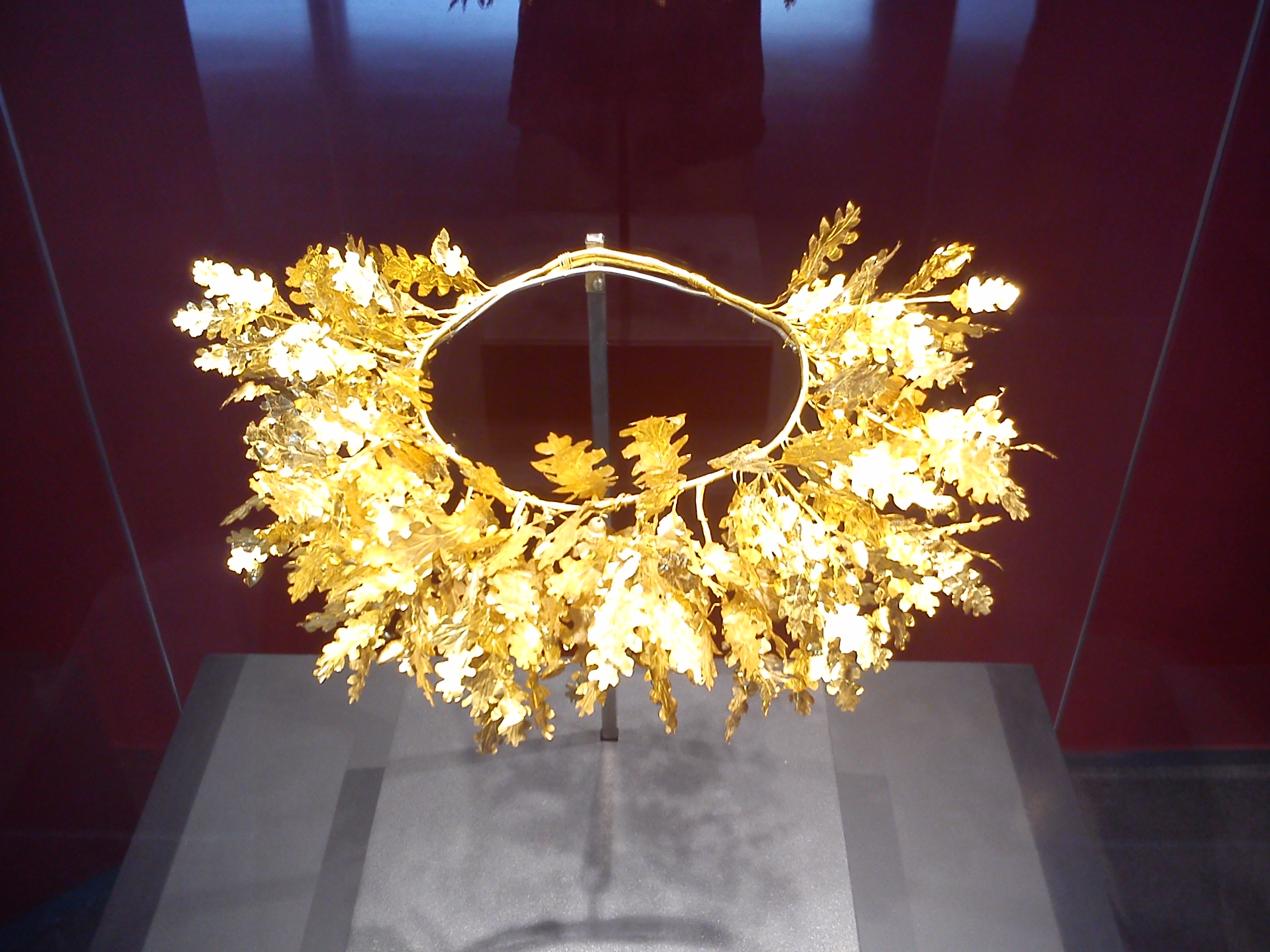
Funerary gold oak crown from the royal tombs at Aegae (Vergina)

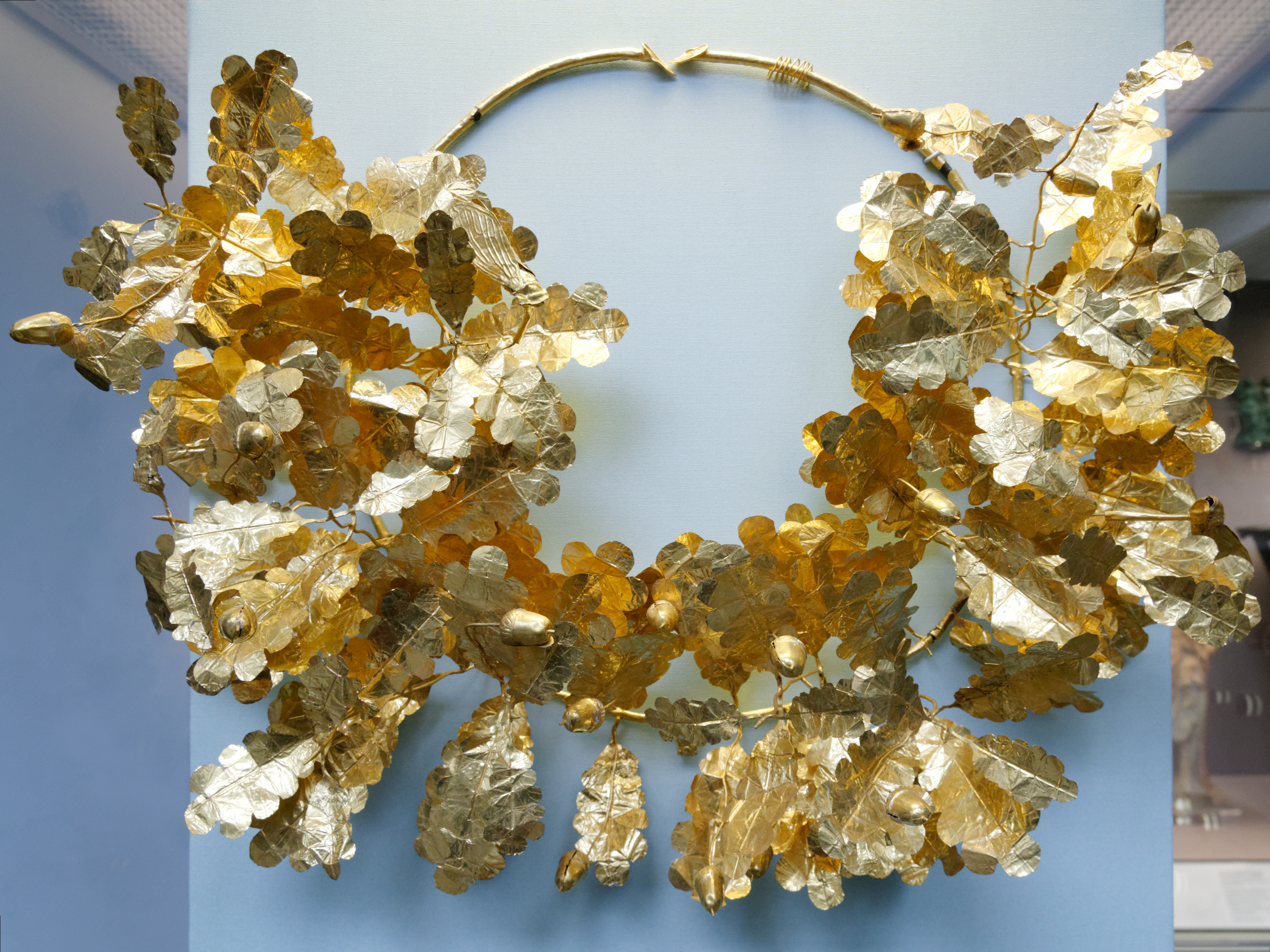
Late 4th-century BC Hellenistic gold oak wreath, including gold cicadas and a bee (British Museum)

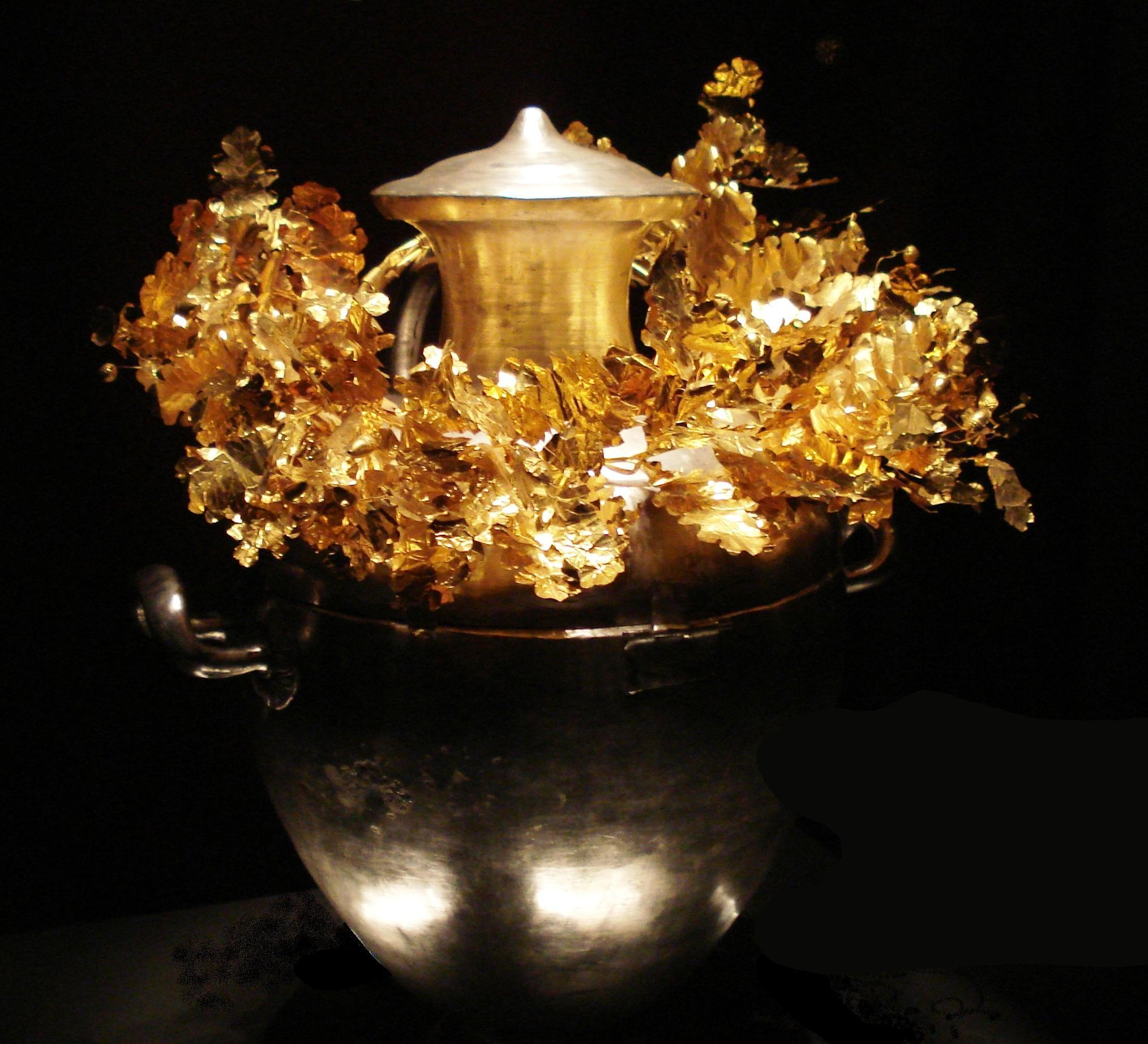
Silver ampulla with a gold wreath from the Kingdom of Macedon's royal tombs at Aegae (Vergina)

== Crown Games ==
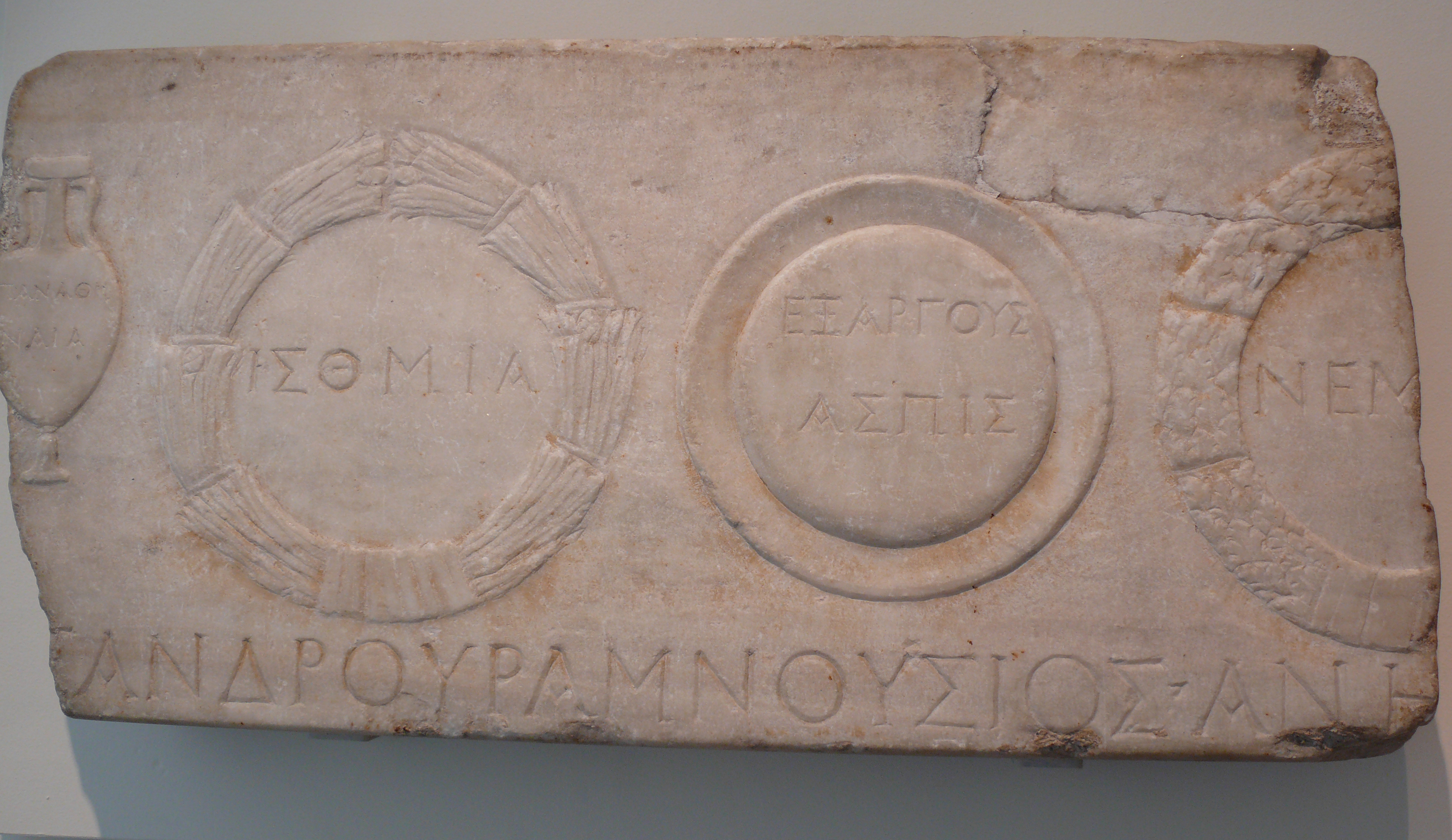
Antonine period relief of athletic prizes, including the Isthmian Games' pine crown (L, marked Ancient Greek: ΙΣΘΜΙΑ, romanized: Isthmia) and the celery wreath of the Nemean Games (R, marked: ΝΕΜΕΑ, Neméa) (Metropolitan Museum of Art)

Every four years the wild olive tree Olea oleaster (Ancient Greek: κότινος, romanized: kótinos) growing at Olympia provided the branches to fashion the crowns which were awarded at the ancient Olympic Games in honour of Zeus (Jupiter). At the Pythian Games at Delphi, also held every four years, the bay laurel Laurus nobilis – sacred to Apollo – was used for the crowns awarded. At Nemea, a crown of wild celery was awarded to the victor at the Nemean Games, held every two years in honour of Heracles (Hercules) and Zeus. In honour of Poseidon (Neptune), every two years at Isthmia on the Isthmus of Corinth a crown of pine was awarded at the Isthmian Games, though according to Pliny the Elder's encyclopaedic Natural History, the prize was originally a wreath of celery, as at Nemea. At the Panathenaic Games instituted during Classical Greece, the prize was a crown of olive.

== Rome ==
Imperial Arval Brothers wearing corn-sheaf crowns (Louvre)

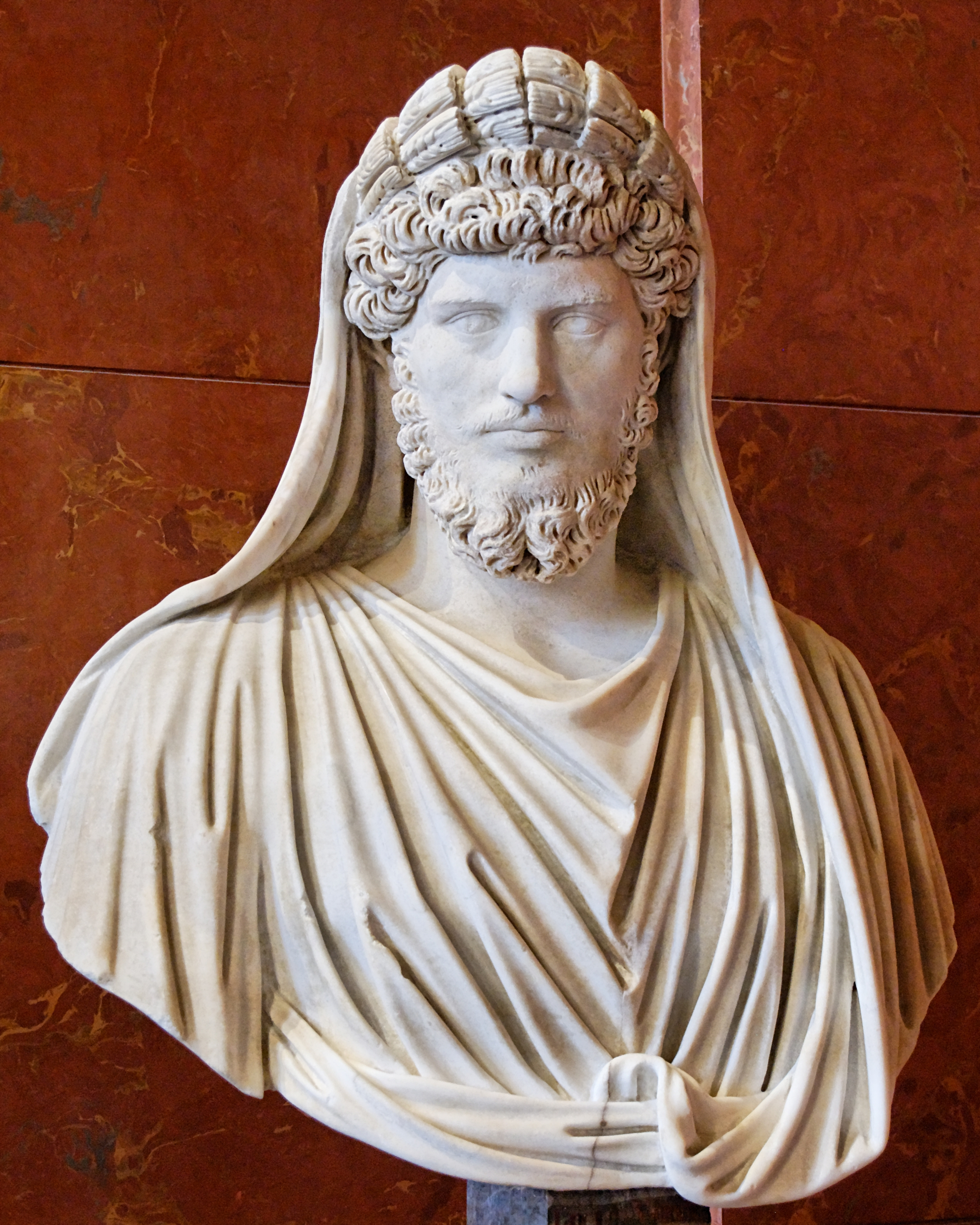
Lucius Verus (r. 161–169)

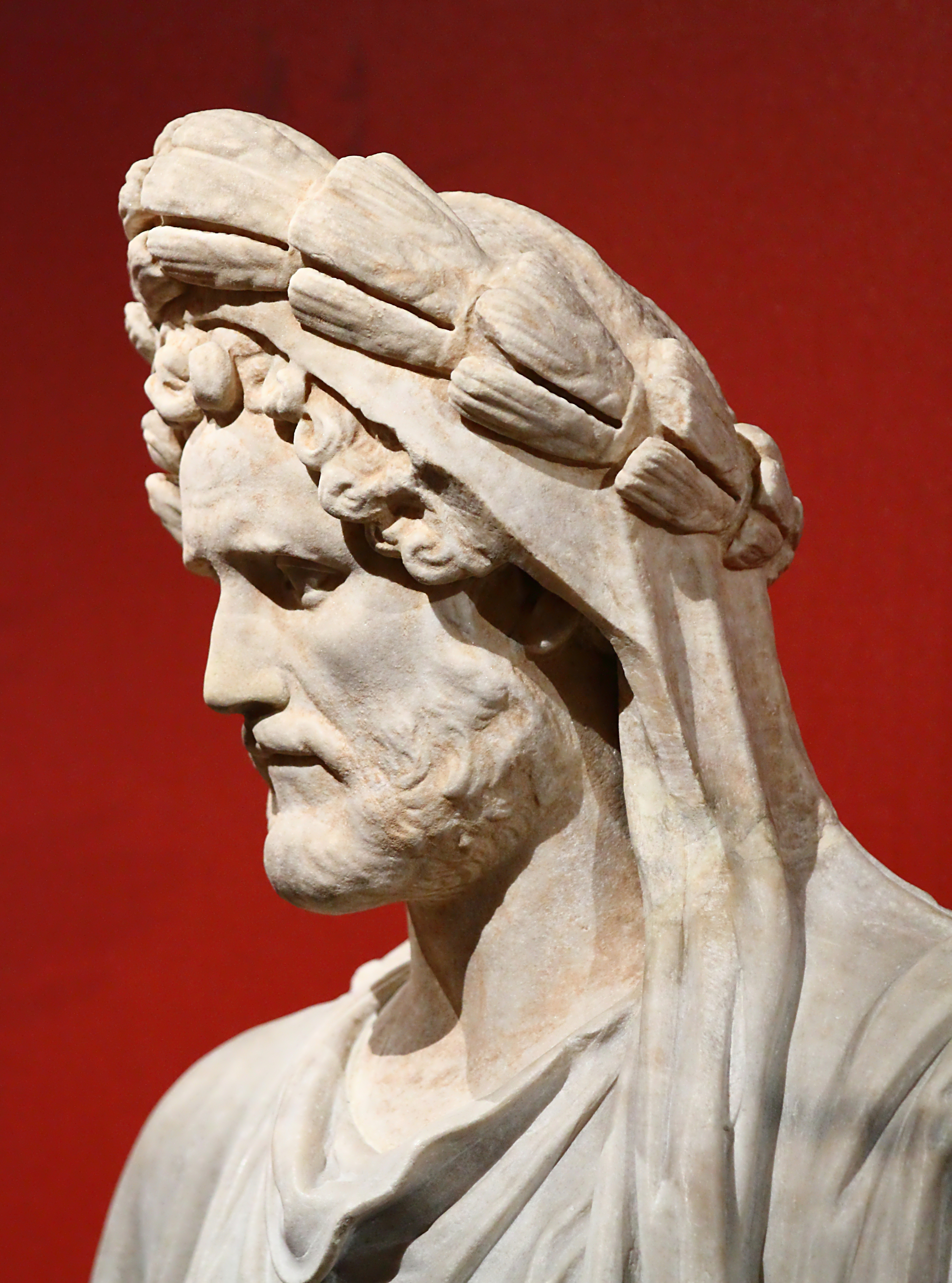
Antoninus Pius (r. 138–161)

Laurel wreaths from the bay laurel tree Laurus nobilis were worn by triumphatores – victorious generals celebrating a Roman triumph. Generals awarded a lesser celebration ritual, the ovation (Latin: ovatio) wore wreaths of myrtle (Myrtus communis).

Wreaths (Latin: coronae, lit. 'crowns') were awarded as military awards and decorations. In the Roman Republic, the nature of the feat determined the nature of the wreath awarded. It was a custom for soldiers rescued from a siege to present a wreath made of grass (Latin: corona graminea or corona obsidionalis) to the commander of the relieving force. This award was extremely rare, and Pliny the Elder enumerated only eight times occasions that had warranted the honour, ending with the emperor Augustus. The oak leaf civic crown (Latin: corona civica) was awarded to Romans who had saved the life of another citizen in battle. The award was open to soldiers in the Roman army of all ranks, unlike most other wreaths, which were awarded to commanders and officers only in the Roman imperial period of the Roman Empire.

A gold wreath (Latin: corona aurea) was also awarded for gallant military conduct. In the Roman navy, the naval crown (Latin: corona navalis, corona classica, or corona rostrata) was a wreath awarded for feats in naval battles. In an assault on a fortified position, a mural crown (Latin: corona muralis) was awarded to the first man onto the walls of the enemy fortification.

Crowns became essential parts of the regalia of the Roman emperors during the Roman imperial period. The laurel wreaths of a triumphator were often worn by imperial portraits, as were radiate crowns.

According to Pliny the Elder, the Arval Brethren, an ancient Roman priesthood, were accustomed to wear a wreath of grain sheaves.

In the Christian New Testament, the gospels of Matthew, Mark, and John claim that a crown of thorns was woven and placed on Jesus' head by Roman legionnaires during the second stage of his mocking, parodying his title as King of the Jews. The crown was often alluded to by the early Church Fathers, such as Clement of Alexandria, Origen and others, and is referenced in the apocryphal Gospel of Peter.

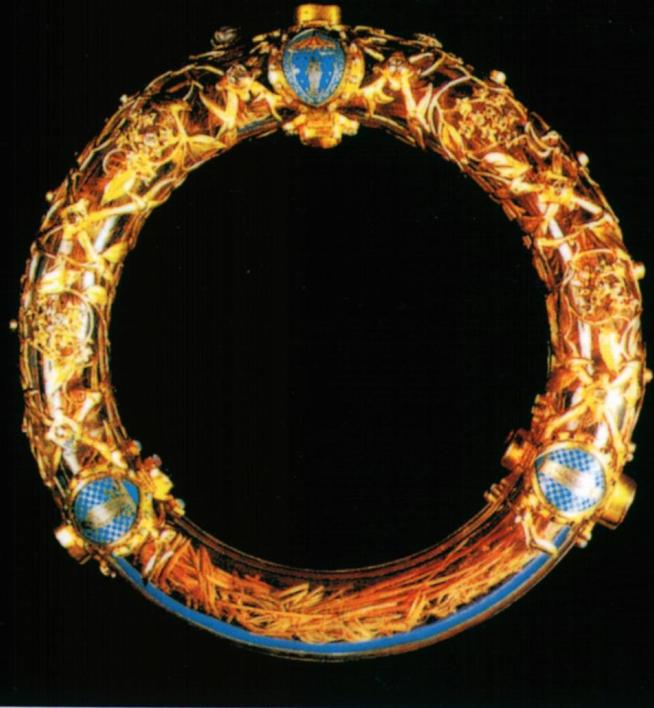
A purported relic of the Crown of Thorns, received by the French King Louis IX from Emperor Baldwin II.

Crowns and wreaths were associated by early Christians with Roman paganism and Hellenistic religion. The 2nd and 3rd century Latin theologian Tertullian opposed the wearing of wreaths in his work De corona, 'About the Crown'. This opposition had little effect, and Christian martyrs were lauded as having won "martyrs' crowns".

Roman coins

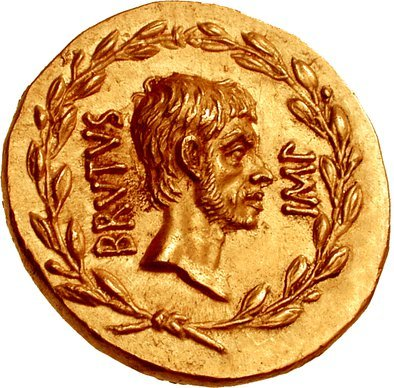
Aureus of Marcus Junius Brutus, whose portrait is surrounded by a laurel wreath

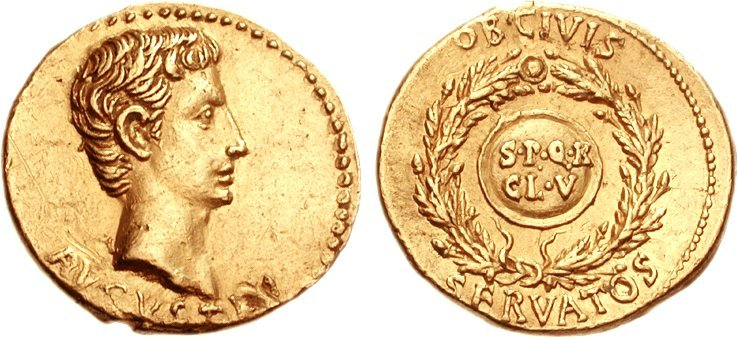
Oak wreath on an aureus of Augustus

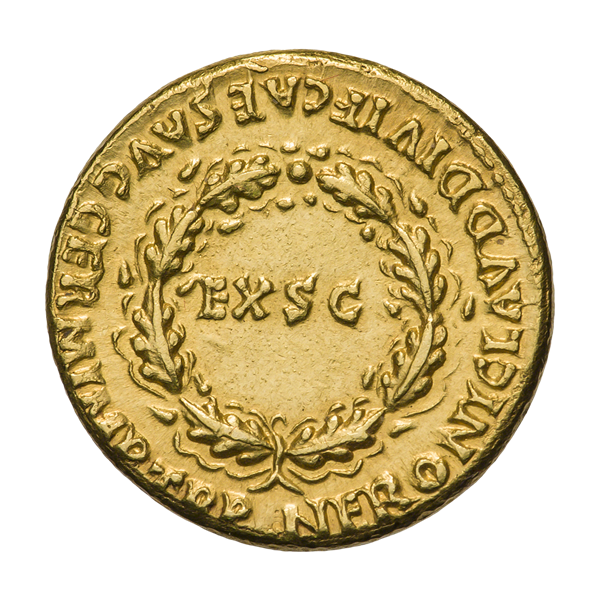
Oak wreath on an aureus of Nero as son of the deified Claudius

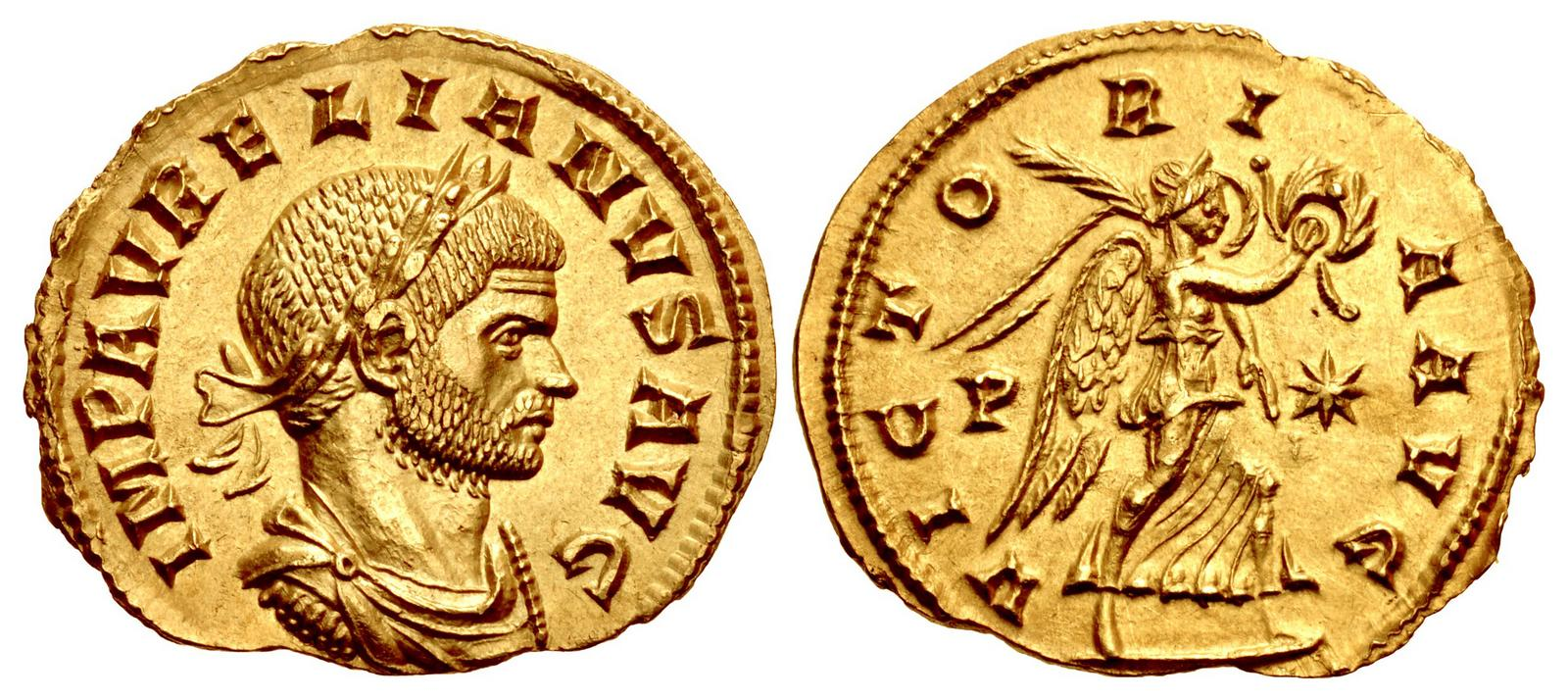
Aureus of the emperor Aurelian (r. 270–275) wearing a laurel wreath on the obverse, with Victoria presenting another on the reverse

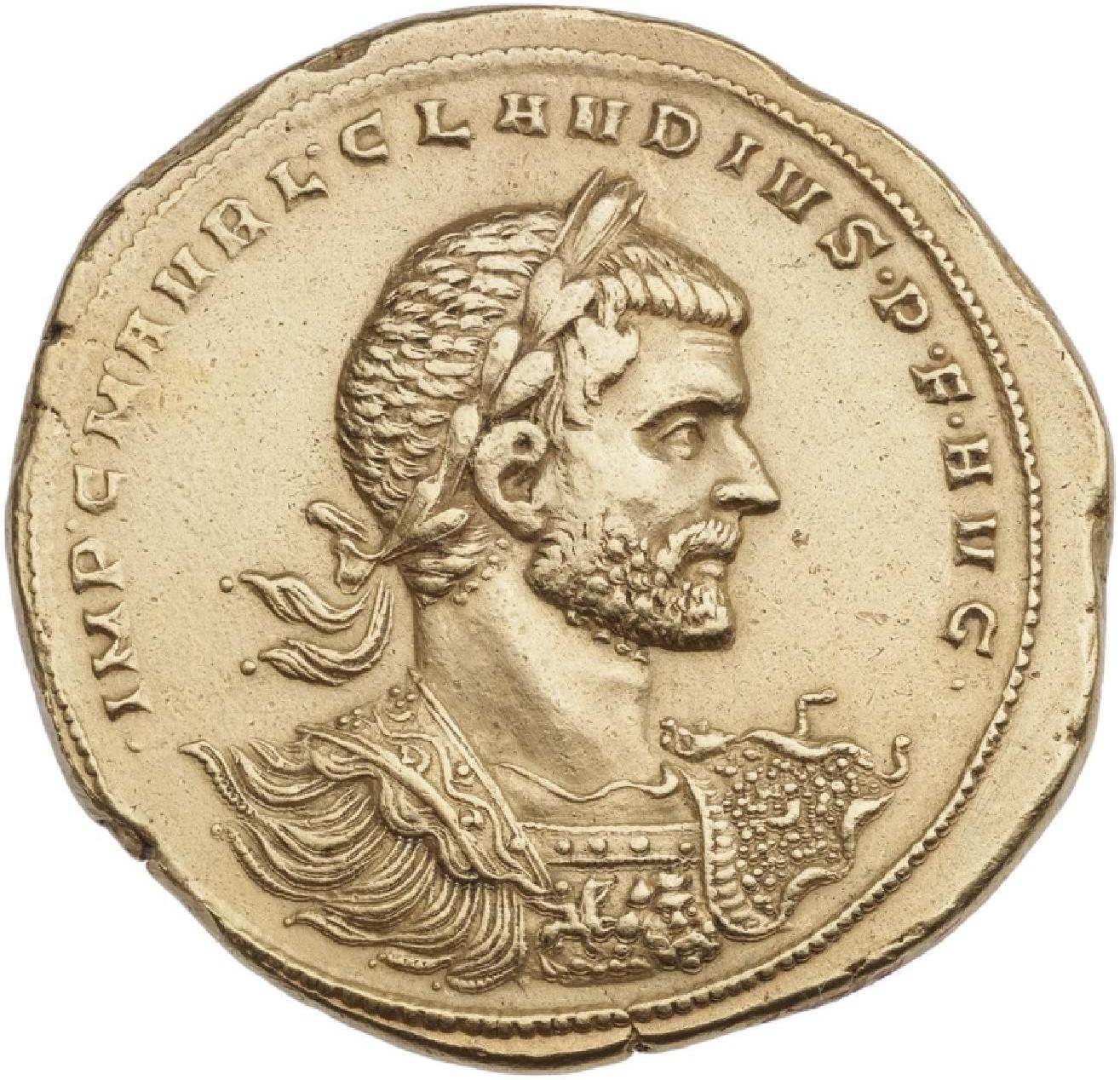
Aureus of the emperor Claudius Gothicus (r. 268–270) wearing a laurel wreath

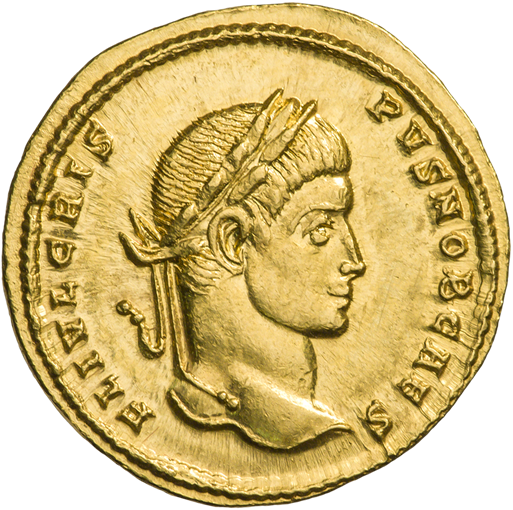
Laureate portrait of the caesar Crispus (r. 317–324), on a solidus marked:

== Late Antiquity ==
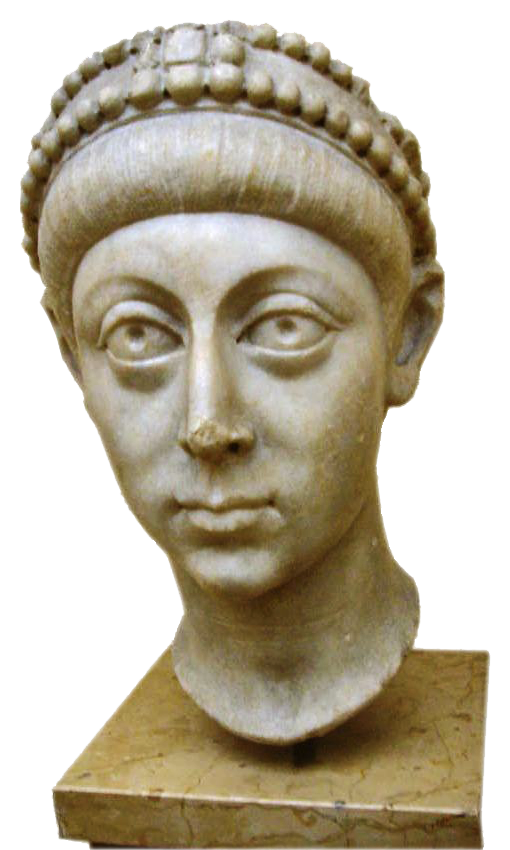
The Beyazit head – a portrait head of Arcadius (r. 383–408) wearing a pearl diadem (Istanbul Archaeology Museums)

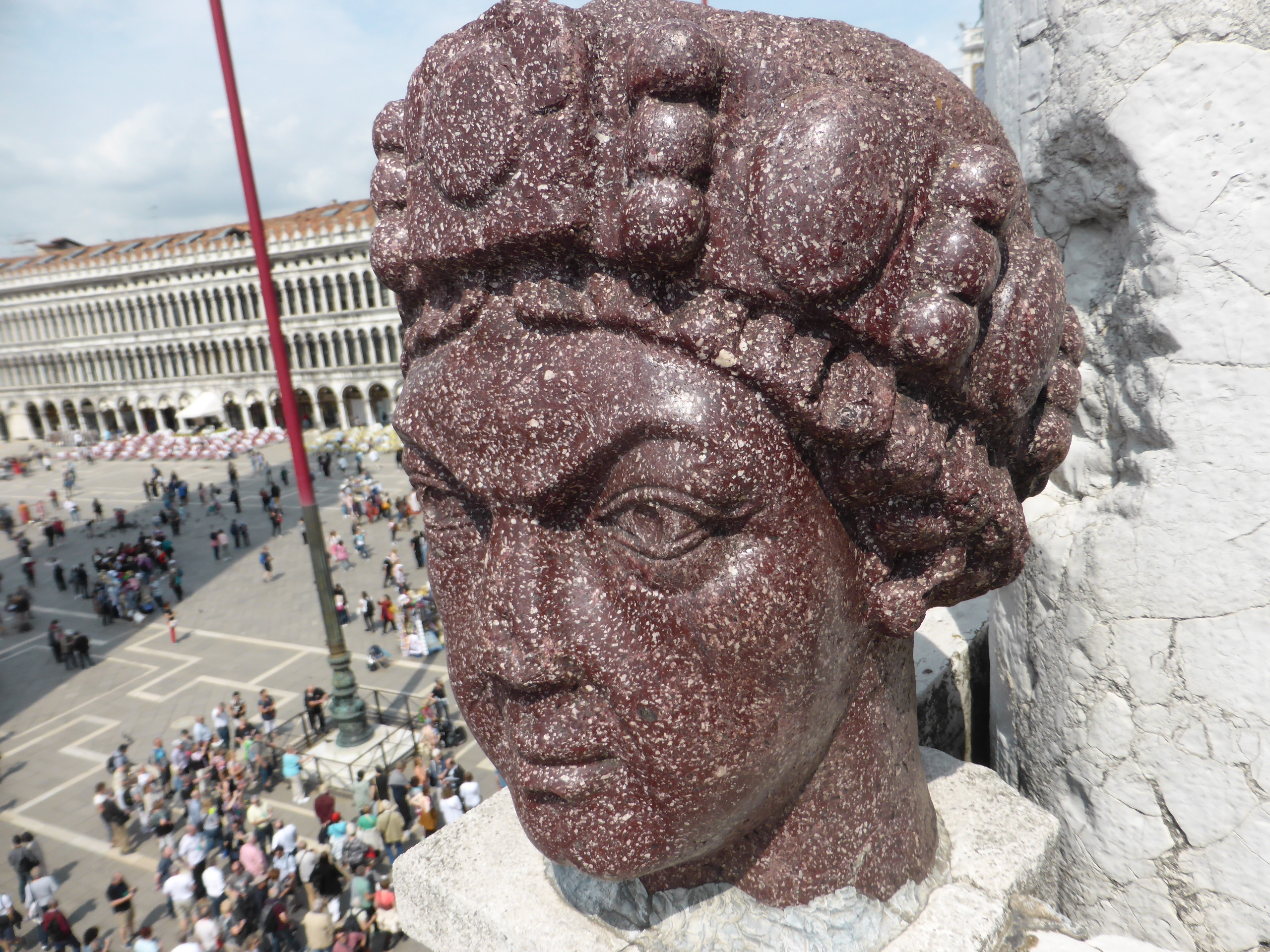
The Carmagnola – a portrait head, probably of Justinian the Great (r. 527–565), wearing a jewelled diadem (St Mark's Basilica)

Radiate crowns were associated with the sun, and the 3rd-century Roman emperors issued coins – antoniniani – with the imperial portrait wearing a radiate crown. Soon after the Christianization of the Roman Empire in the reign of Constantine the Great (r. 306–337), the radiate crown disappeared from official use. Constantine began the practice of wearing a diadem on coinage, hitherto avoided by the Romans and a symbol of the kingdoms of the Hellenistic period. Thereafter, the laurel wreath was usually the crown of a caesar, a junior imperial rank, while the diadem was worn by an augustus. Imperial diadems could be plain bands, or adorned with pearls or with rosettes. Emperors were frequently shown crowned by Victory or another protective deity on their coinage and medallions, and later this function was performed by the hand of God (Latin: Dexter Dei).

A coronation linked with an individual's accession to imperial rank is first attested in the 4th century; the Roman army participated in the ceremonies, as well as the Roman Senate or the Byzantine Senate. After the imperial capital settled at Constantinople in the reign of Arcadius (r. 383–408), the urban population also played a particular role.

After the fall of the Western Roman Empire during the late 5th century, crowns in the post-Roman west, as in the eastern Roman empire, crowns were more elaborate than previously, constructed from beaten gold and ornamented with precious stones. Some were also endowed with relics, making them reliquaries.

From the 7th century Visigothic Kingdom survive the many gold votive crowns of the Treasure of Guarrazar, among which is the crown of the Visigothic king Recceswinth (r. 649–672). These crowns were never to be worn, and were votive offerings. The oldest royal crown to survive is likely the Iron Crown of Lombardy, whose present form dates from the 8th or 9th centuries.

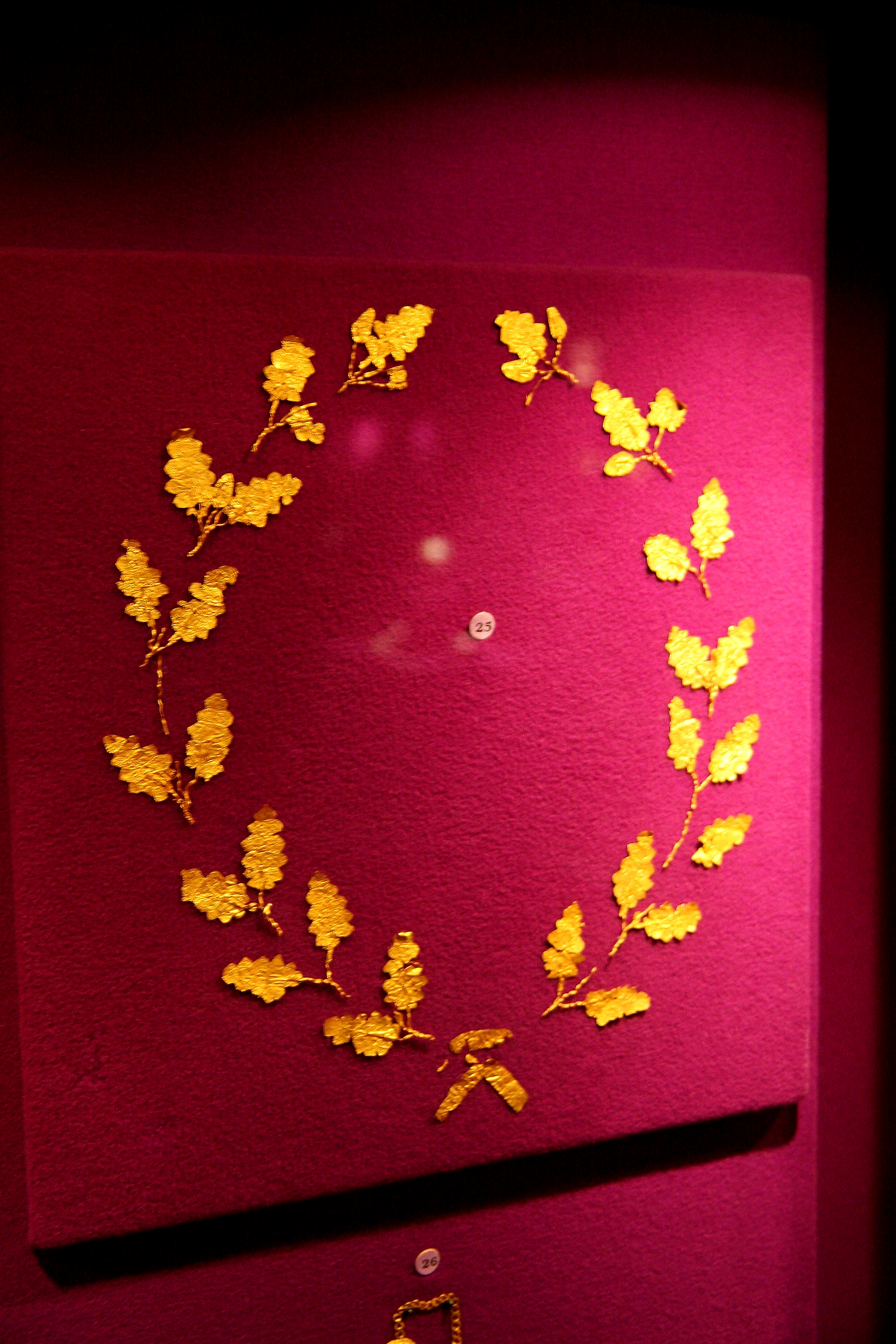
Gold oak wreath (National Museum of Romanian History)

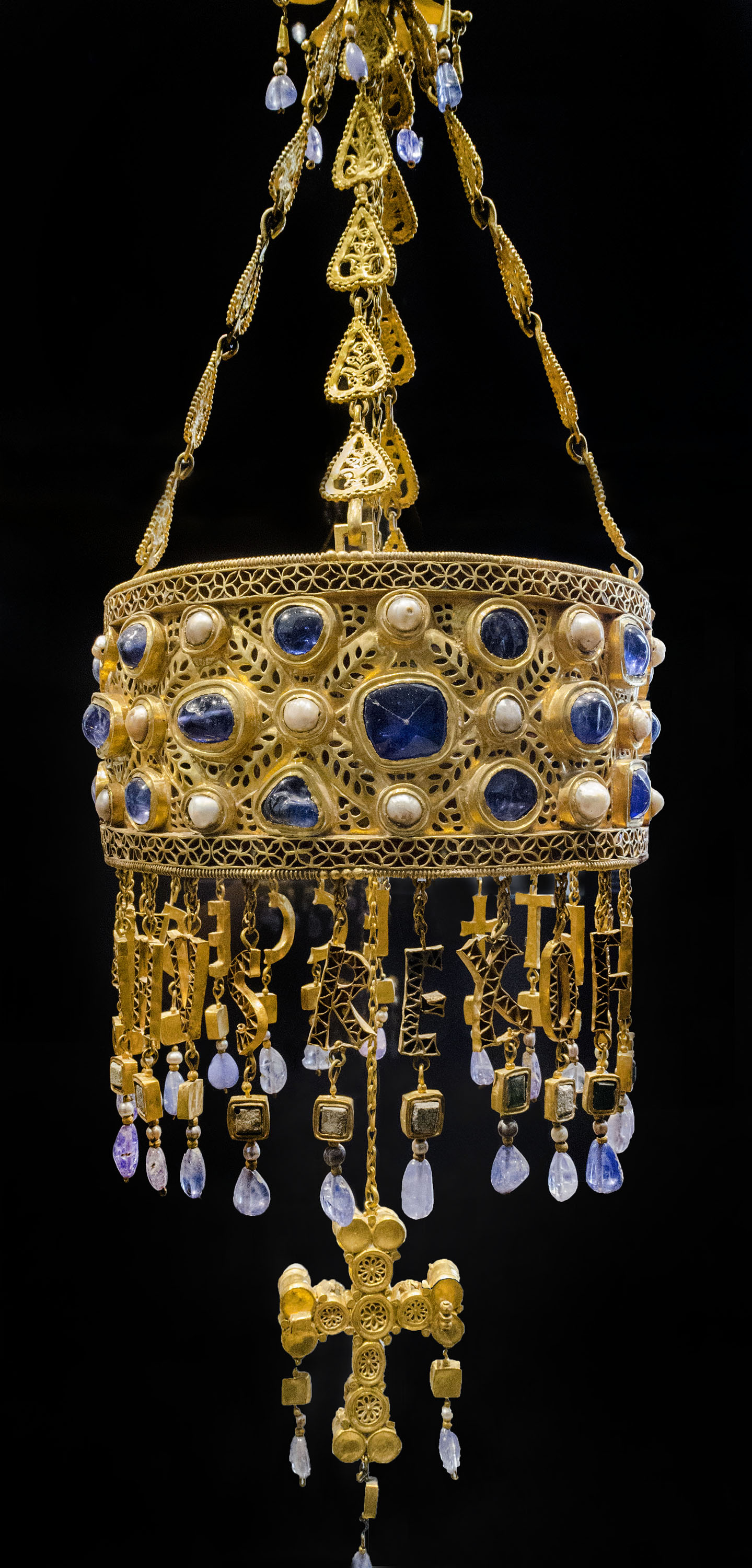
Votive crown of Recceswinth from the Treasure of Guarrazar (National Archaeological Museum, Madrid)

== See also ==
- Civic Crown
- Corolla (headgear)
- Grass Crown
- Kether
- Klila
- Laureate
- Mural crown
- Naval crown
- Nobel laureate
- Olive wreath
- Polos
- Coat of arms of Greece
- Crown of Immortality
- Five Crowns
- Halo
- Velificatio
- Laurel wreath
- Radiate crown
