= Trebia =

Trebia or Trebbia can refer to:

- The Trebbia River, in Italy
- Trebia (ancient Latin town)
- The Battle of the Trebia, 18 December 218 BC
- The Battle of Trebia (1799)
- Villa del Trebbio, a Tuscan villa
- Trebbiano, a grape
