= Titus Sicinius Sabinus =

Roman politician and soldier, consul in 487 BC

Titus Sicinius (Sabinus?) or Siccius (fl. c. 487 BC - 480 BC) was a Roman Republican politician during the beginning of the 5th century BC. He served as Consul of Rome in 487 BC, serving together with Gaius Aquillius Tuscus.

== Family origins ==
The Sicinius gens has been traditionally known as a plebeian family although it also had a singular Patrician branch of which it is likely Titus Sicinius belonged. He is the only member of his gens to ever rise to the office of Consul of Rome. Although no other members of this gens, almost all of whom were Plebeian, rose to that high office, many were later to go on to become significant members in the Patrician-Plebeian struggles that dominated the mid to late republican period.

== Biography ==
During the consulship of Sicinius and Aquillius, wars were waged against each of the Volsci and the Hernici. Livy says that Sicinius was given leadership against the former, and Aquillius the latter, although Dionysius of Halicarnassus suggests they were both involved in each war. Dionysius also records that Sicinius was awarded a triumph for his victory over the Volsci, and an ovation against the Hernici.

Sicinius served later as a legate under the command of Marcus Fabius Vibulanus in 480 BC.

== See also ==
- List of Roman Republican consuls
- Roman Republic
- Sicinia gens

Political offices
| Preceded by Spurius Nautius Rutilus; Sextus Furius | Roman consul 487 BC with Gaius Aquillius Tuscus | Succeeded by Spurius Cassius Vecellinus III; Proculus Verginius Tricostus Rutilus |
