= Publius Pinarius Mamercinus Rufus =

Roman senator, consul in 489 BC

Consul of the Roman Republic
- In office 1 September 489 BC – 29 August 488 BC Serving with Gaius Julius Iulus (consul 489 BC)
- Preceded by: Quintus Sulpicius Camerinus Cornutus, Spurius Larcius
- Succeeded by: Spurius Nautius Rutilus, Sextus Furius Medullinus (consul 488 BC)

Personal details
- Born: Unknown; Ancient Rome
- Died: Unknown; Ancient Rome

Publius Pinarius Mamercinus Rufus was a Roman senator who held the consulship alongside Gaius Julius Iulus in 489 BC.

== Family ==
Rufus was the first member of the gens Pinaria to attain the consulship. The Pinarii were an ancient patrician family of Rome, whose origins were said to go back to the founding of the city.

== Biography ==
In 489 BC, he was elected consul with Gaius Julius Iulus as his colleague.

Livy says that, during their term, games were held and a host of the Volsci were invited to see them. The man who invited them, Attius Tullius Aufidius, warned Rufus and Iulus that the Volsci may commit an act similar to that of the Sabines in the Rape of the Sabines just a couple years earlier. The consuls then shared Aufidius' suspicions with the Senate, and the Senate decreed that the Volsci should leave the city. The Volsci were indignant that they should have to leave the games without reason, and a conflict began between them and the Romans.

In 488 BC, Rufus was one of the consular envoys sent to negotiate with the Volsci, and with Gaius Marcius Coriolanus, who was a Roman exile leading the Volsci.

== Bibliography ==
=== Primary sources ===
- Livy, The History of Rome, Book II

=== Secondary sources ===
- Broughton, Thomas Robert Shannon (1951), The Magistrates of the Roman Republic, Philological Monograph No. 15, New York: American Philological Association, ISBN 0-89130-811-3

Political offices
Preceded by Quintus Sulpicius Camerinus Cornutus, and Spurius Larcius	Consul of the Roman Republic; 489 BC with Gaius Julius Iulus	Succeeded by Spurius Nautius Rutilus, and Sextus Furius Medullinus
