= Gaius Julius Iullus =

Gaius Julius Iullus may refer to:

- Gaius Julius Iullus (consul 489 BC), the first ancient patrician to attain the consulship
- Gaius Julius Iullus (decemvir), consul 482 BC, decemvir 451 BC
- Gaius Julius Iullus (consul 447 BC), also consul 435 BC
- Gaius Julius Iullus (censor), consular tribune 408 and 405 BC, censor 393 BC
