= Quintus Sulpicius Camerinus Cornutus (consul) =

5th century BC Roman senator and consul

- Years active: fl. 490–488 BC
- Office: Consul (490 BC)
- Children: Servius Sulpicius Camerinus Cornutus

Quintus Sulpicius Camerinus Cornutus (fl. 490–488 BC) was a Roman politician, and consul in 490 BC.

== Family ==
He was a member of the gens Sulpicia, specifically he was among the Sulpicii Camerini. His father Servius Sulpicius Camerinus Cornutus (consul 500 BC) was the first consul of the Sulpicii, which may have taken its name from the town of Cameria or Camerium in Latium, and his son Servius Sulpicius Camerinus Cornutus was consul in 461 BC, and decemvir in 451 BC.

== Career ==
In 490 BC, Cornutus was consul with Spurius Larcius. Dionysius of Halicarnassus ascribes many odd occurrences to their consulship, such as the birth of monstrosities, and people hearing voices. Then he tells of a pestilence that mostly killed cattle, but not many people.

In 488 BC, the Volsci under Coriolanus marched on Rome and besieged the city. Cornutus, and his former colleague Lartius, were among the ambassadors sent to intercede with Coriolanus.

== Sources ==
- Dionysius of Halicarnassus, Romaike Archaiologia (in Greek)
- Broughton, Thomas Robert Shannon (1951), The Magistrates of the Roman Republic, Philological Monograph No. 15, New York: American Philological Association, ISBN 0-89130-811-3

Political offices
Preceded by Marcus Minucius Augurinus; Aulus Sempronius Atratinus	Roman consul 490 BC; With: Spurius Larcius	Succeeded by Gaius Julius Iulus; Publius Pinarius Mamercinus Rufus
