= Sicinia gens =

Ancient Roman family

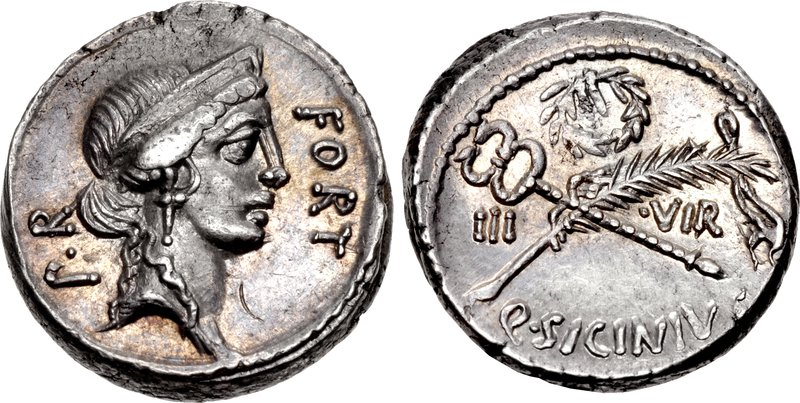
Denarius of Quintus Sicinius, 49 BC. The obverse features a head of Fortuna. The reverse depicts a laurel wreath, a palm frond, and a caduceus, emblems of a triumph, indicating Sicinius' hope for a Pompeian victory.

The gens Sicinia was a plebeian family at ancient Rome. Members of this gens occur throughout the history of the Republic, but only one of them obtained the consulship, Titus Sicinius Sabinus in 487 BC. Throughout the long Conflict of the Orders, the Sicinii were celebrated for their efforts on behalf of the plebeians.

== Origin ==
The only hint as to the origin of the Sicinii comes from the surname Sabinus, applied to one of the first members of this family appearing in history. Sabinus belongs to a common class of surnames derived from the names of peoples or localities, and suggests that the Sicinii may have been of Sabine origin. Although the earliest Sicinii occurring in history were plebeians, as were all of the later members of this gens, some scholars have concluded that Titus Sicinius Sabinus must have been a patrician, and the gens originally a patrician family, since the consulship was opened to the plebeians by the lex Licinia Sextia in 367 BC, a hundred and twenty years after Sabinus. But more recent scholarship suggests that the consulship was not originally restricted to the patricians, and only became so in the years following the decemvirate, from 451 to 449 BC.

== Praenomina ==
The main praenomina of the Sicinii were Lucius, Gaius, Gnaeus, Titus, and Quintus, all of which were common throughout Roman history. The early generations of the family may have used Spurius, but the nomen of this individual is uncertain, and he may not have been a member of the same family.

== Branches and cognomina ==
The Sicinii do not seem to have been divided into distinct branches, and most of those mentioned in history bore no cognomen. Of those that do appear, Vellutus or Bellutus seems to be derived from vellus, wool, and must have designated someone with conspicuously abundant or wooly hair. Sabinus referred to a Sabine, presumably referring either to a tradition that the Sicinii were of Sabine extraction, or that the individual to whom the surname was first applied had the characteristic habits or appearance of a Sabine. Dentatus would have been applied to someone with prominent teeth.

== Members ==
This list includes abbreviated praenomina. For an explanation of this practice, see filiation.

- Lucius Sicinius L. f. Bellutus or Vellutus, one of the plebeian leaders during the secession of the plebs to the Sacred Mount in 494 BC. He was subsequently elected one of the first tribunes of the plebs, and was aedile in 492. He was tribune a second time in 491, and opposed the harsh measures proposed by Coriolanus.
- Spurius Sicinius Bellutus, tribune of the plebs in 492 BC, perhaps a brother of Lucius, although some scholars think him a mistake for Spurius Icilius, otherwise his colleague in the tribunate.
- Titus Sicinius Sabinus, (Note: Sicinius in Livy and Festus, but Siccius in Dionysius, Cassiodorus, and apparently the Fasti Capitolini.) consul in 487 BC, defeated the Volsci and received a triumph. He was a legate under the consul Manlius in 480.
- Gaius Sicinius, (Note: Gnaeus Siccius in some manuscripts of Livy.) tribune of the plebs in 470 BC, the first year that the tribunes were elected by the comitia tributa. Together with his colleague, Marcus Duilius, he attempted to prosecute Appius Claudius Sabinus, the consul of the preceding year, for opposing an agrarian law.
- Lucius Sicinius Dentatus, (Note: Siccius in some writers.) tribune of the plebs in 454 BC, was a famous warrior, described by ancient historians as "the Roman Achilles", for his courage and martial prowess. Under the second decemvirate, he encouraged the people to secede again, and was assassinated by the decemvirs.
- Gaius Sicinius L. f. L. n. (Bellutus), son of Lucius Sicinius, one of the first tribunes of the plebs in 493 BC, was elected to that office during the second secession in 449 BC. Together with his colleagues, he called for the election of new consuls to replace the decemvirs, to restore the right of appeal, and for there to be no retribution against the leaders of the secession.
- Titus Sicinius, tribune of the plebs in 395 BC, he proposed the establishment of a substantial colony at Veii, the great Etruscan rival of Rome, which had been conquered by Camillus the previous year.
- Lucius Sicinius, tribune of the plebs in 387 BC, proposed a law distributing arable land in the ager Pomptinus.
- Gnaeus Sicinius, aedile in 185 BC, and praetor in 183, received the province of Sardinia. Praetor for the second time in 172, he spent his year of office forming alliances and raising troops for the Third Macedonian War, and was propraetor the following year, assigned the province of Macedonia.
- Gnaeus Sicinius, (Note: Lucius Sicinius in Sallust.) tribune of the plebs in 76 BC, led the assault on the Sullan law, which deprived the tribunes of much of their power. He harshly criticized the aristocracy, but Cicero relates that he was a poor orator, his chief virtue being the ability to make his audience laugh.
- Gaius Sicinius, a grandson of Quintus Pompeius, the consul of 141 BC, was quaestor circa 70 BC, but died before his career could advance further. Cicero mentions him among those Romans who had developed a talent for oratory.
- Sicinius, mentioned in one of Cicero's letters to Titus Pomponius Atticus, dating to 51 BC.
- Quintus Sicinius, triumvir monetalis in 49 BC, possibly the same as the man mentioned by Cicero in 51. A supporter of Pompeius, with whom he departed Rome ahead of Caesar's approach, but he continued to mint coins for Pompeius during their flight.
- Sicinius Amicus, the first husband of Aemilia Pudentilla, and father of Sicinius Pontianus and Sicinius Pudens. After his death, his elder son encouraged a friend, the writer Apuleius, to marry Pudentilla, who was quite wealthy.
- Sicinius Aemilianus, the brother of Sicinius Amicus and Sicinius Clarus, and uncle of Sicinius Pontianus and Sicinius Pudens, was persuaded by Herennius Rufus to join the accusation against Apuleius.
- Sicinius Clarus, the brother of Sicinius Amicus and Sicinius Aemilianus, described by Apuleius as a feeble old country gentleman.
- Sicinius Pontianus, a native of Oea (now Tripoli), and friend of Apuleius at Athens. He encouraged Apuleius to marry his mother, Pudentilla, a wealthy widow. However, Pontianus' father-in-law, Herennius Rufinus, eager to ensure that Prudentilla's money should remain in his family, induced Pontianus, his younger brother, Sicinius Pudens, and his uncle, Sicinius Aemilianus, to charge Apuleius with gaining Prudentilla's affections through witchcraft. Apuleius' spirited and ultimately successful defense formed the basis of his Apologia, or "Discourse on Magic".
- Pontianus Pudens, the younger brother of Sicinius Pontianus, was only a boy when Herennius Rufus persuaded him to join the accusation against Apuleius.
- Marcus Sicinius Philodamus, a boy buried at Rome, was the son of a vir egregius, a member of the equestrian nobility of the late second or early third centuries.
- Quintus Sicinius Clarus, governor of Thrace circa AD 202.

== See also ==
- List of Roman gentes

== Bibliography ==
- Marcus Tullius Cicero, Brutus, Epistulae ad Atticum.
- Gaius Sallustius Crispus (Sallust), Historiae (The Histories).
- Dionysius of Halicarnassus, Romaike Archaiologia (Roman Antiquities).
- Titus Livius (Livy), History of Rome.
- Valerius Maximus, Factorum ac Dictorum Memorabilium (Memorable Facts and Sayings).
- Pseudo-Asconius, Commentarius in Oratorio Ciceronis Divinatio in Quintum Caecilium (Commentary on Cicero's Divinatio in Quintum Caecilium).
- Gaius Plinius Secundus (Pliny the Elder), Historia Naturalis (Natural History).
- Marcus Fabius Quintilianus (Quintilian), Institutio Oratoria (Institutes of Oratory).
- Lucius Mestrius Plutarchus (Plutarch), Lives of the Noble Greeks and Romans.
- Apuleius, Apologia.
- Aulus Gellius, Noctes Atticae (Attic Nights).
- Barthold Georg Niebuhr, The History of Rome, Julius Charles Hare and Connop Thirlwall, trans., John Smith, Cambridge (1828).
- Wilhelm Drumann, Geschichte Roms in seinem Übergang von der republikanischen zur monarchischen Verfassung, oder: Pompeius, Caesar, Cicero und ihre Zeitgenossen, Königsberg (1834–1844).
- Dictionary of Greek and Roman Biography and Mythology, William Smith, ed., Little, Brown and Company, Boston (1849).
- Theodor Mommsen et alii, Corpus Inscriptionum Latinarum (The Body of Latin Inscriptions, abbreviated CIL), Berlin-Brandenburgische Akademie der Wissenschaften (1853–present).
- George Davis Chase, "The Origin of Roman Praenomina", in Harvard Studies in Classical Philology, vol. VIII, pp. 103–184 (1897).
- Paul von Rohden, Elimar Klebs, & Hermann Dessau, Prosopographia Imperii Romani (The Prosopography of the Roman Empire, abbreviated PIR), Berlin (1898).
- T. Robert S. Broughton, The Magistrates of the Roman Republic, American Philological Association (1952–1986).
- Michael Crawford, Roman Republican Coinage, Cambridge University Press (1974, 2001).
- Timothy J. Cornell, The Beginnings of Rome: Italy and Rome from the Bronze Age to the Punic Wars (c. 1000–264 BC), Routledge, London (1995).
