= Lartia gens =

Ancient Roman family

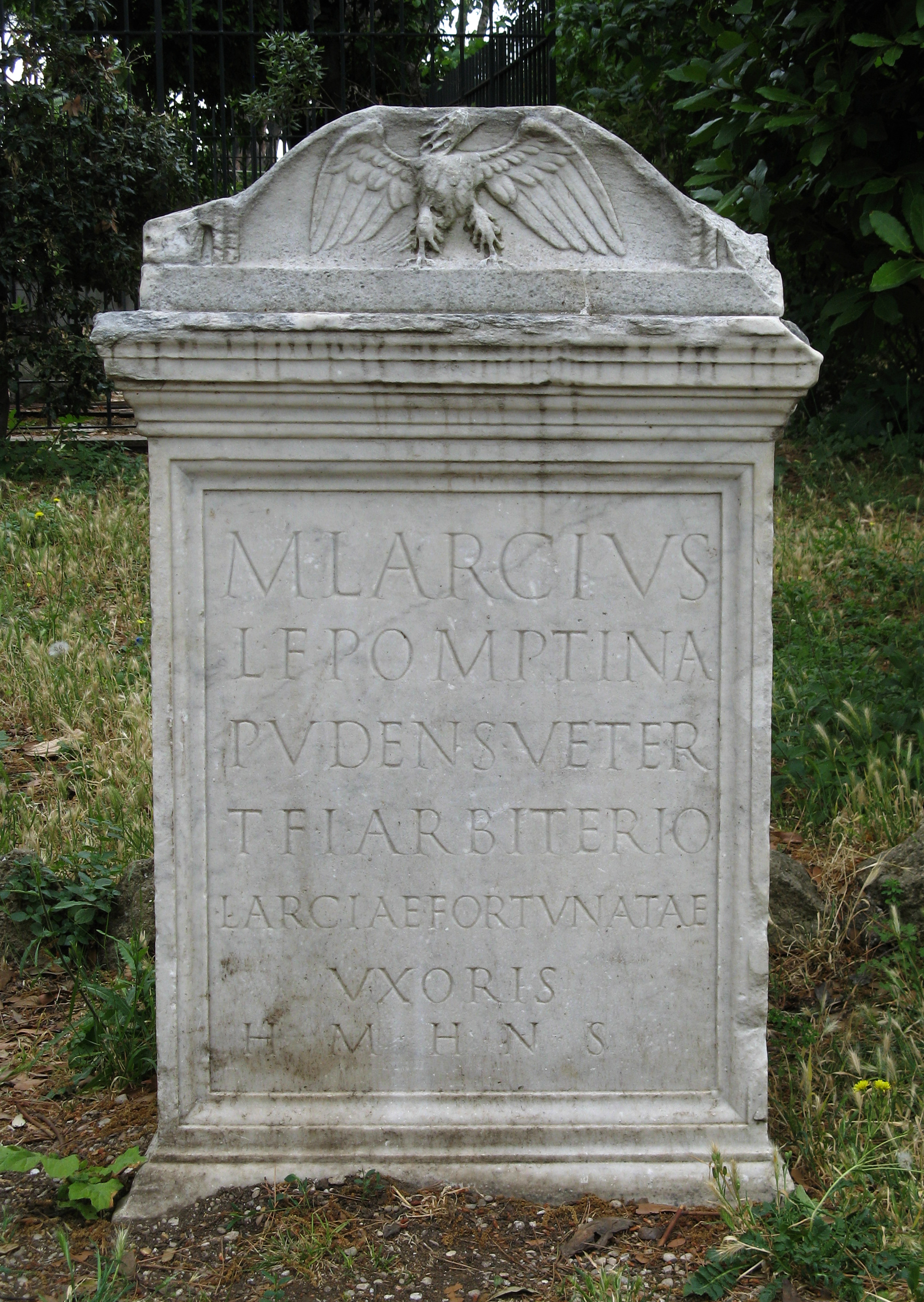
Funerary altar of Marcus Larcius Pudens, 2nd century (Rome, Villa Celimontana)

The gens Lartia, also spelled Larcia, or rarely Largia, was a patrician family at ancient Rome, whose members earned great distinction at the beginning of the Republic. Spurius Larcius was one of the two companions of Horatius, who defended the Pons Sublicius against Lars Porsena in 508 BC. A few years later, Titus Larcius became the first Roman dictator. However, the gens all but vanishes from history after this period. A family of the same name existed in the late Republic and under the early Empire, but their relationship to the earlier Lartii is unknown.

== Origin ==
The Lartii were one of several noble families of Etruscan origin during the early Republic. The nomen Lartius is a patronymic surname, based on the Etruscan praenomen Lārs. This name, meaning "lord", is usually spelled Larth in Etruscan inscriptions, but Latin writers also used Lars in place of the Etruscan praenomina Laris and Larce, apparently distinct names in Etruscan. The nomen is always spelled Lartius in Livy, while Dionysius alternates between Larcius (Λάρκιος) and Largius (Λάργιος). All three forms appear on Latin inscriptions.

== Praenomina ==
The only praenomina associated with the Lartii of the early Republic are Titus and Spurius. The Larcii of the late Republic and early Empire used Lucius and Aulus.

== Branches and cognomina ==
According to Dionysius, the Lartii at the outset of the Republic bore the surname Flavus. However, Rufus is found in place of Flavus in some inscriptions. As the consuls of the early Republic are known to have been brothers, it seems possible that one of them, having fair hair, was called Flavus, while the other, having red hair, was called Rufus. The cognomina are now so confused that it is impossible to determine which was which.

== Members ==
- Spurius Larcius, surnamed Flavus or Rufus, consul in 506 and 490 BC.
- Titus Larcius, surnamed Flavus or Rufus, consul in 501 and 498 BC, and the first dictator in 501.
- Lucius Lartius, father of the senator Lucius Lartius.
- Lucius Lartius L. f., a senator in 73 BC, had probably been aedile in an uncertain year.
- Lartius Licinius, a contemporary of the elder Pliny, was praetor in Hispania, and subsequently governor of one of the imperial provinces. He died before Pliny.
- Gnaeus Lartius, father-in-law of Marcus Plautius Silvanus
- Lartia, wife of Marcus Plautius Silvanus, consul in 2 BC.
- Aulus Larcius Gallus, the father of Lepidius Sulpicianus.
- Lucius Larcius Laches, proconsul of Crete and Cyrenaica from AD 36 to 38.
- Aulus Larcius A. f. Lepidius Sulpicianus, commanded a legion in Judea.
- Aulus Larcius Lydus, a freedman, and the father of Larcius Macedo.
- (Aulus) Larcius A. f. Macedo, was murdered by his own slaves.
- Aulus A. f. A. n. Larcius Priscus, the son of Sulpicianus, was consul suffectus in AD 110.
- Aulus Larcius (A. f.) A. n. Macedo, consul suffectus in AD 124.
- Larcius Memor, governor of Egypt around AD 192.

== See also ==
- List of Roman gentes

== Bibliography ==
- Dionysius of Halicarnassus, Romaike Archaiologia (Roman Antiquities).
- Titus Livius (Livy), History of Rome.
- Gaius Plinius Secundus (Pliny the Elder), Historia Naturalis (Natural History).
- Marcus Fabius Quintilianus (Quintilian), Institutio Oratoria.
- Gaius Plinius Caecilius Secundus (Pliny the Younger), Epistulae (Letters).
- Dictionary of Greek and Roman Biography and Mythology, William Smith, ed., Little, Brown and Company, Boston (1849).
- Wilhelm Dittenberger, Sylloge Inscriptionum Graecarum (Collection of Greek Inscriptions, abbreviated SIG), Leipzig (1883).
- George Davis Chase, "The Origin of Roman Praenomina", in Harvard Studies in Classical Philology, vol. VIII (1897).
- T. Robert S. Broughton, The Magistrates of the Roman Republic, American Philological Association (1952).
- Anthony Birley, The Fasti of Roman Britain, Clarendon Press, Oxford (1981).
- Werner Eck, "Miscellanea Prosopographica", in Zeitschrift für Papyrologie und Epigraphik, vol. 42 (1981).
- Martha W. Baldwin Bowsky, "A. Larcius Lepidus Sulpicianus and a Newly Identified Proconsul of Crete and Cyrenaica", in Historia: Zeitschrift für Alte Geschichte, vol. 36 (1987).
