= Spurius Nautius Rutilus (consul 488 BC) =

Roman politician, consul in 488 BC

Spurius Nautius Rutilus (fl. c. 493 – 488 BC) was a Roman Republican aristocrat of the Patrician gens Nautia, who lived during the early 5th century BC. He served as Consul of Rome in 488 BC, with Sextus Furius as his colleague.

== Family ==
Spurius was the probably the elder brother of Gaius Nautius Rutilus, consul in 475 and in 458 BC, but the younger Nautius may have been his son.

== Biography ==
Dionysius of Halicarnassus first mentions Spurius Nautius in 493 BC as having been one of the most distinguished young Patricians during the period of the first secession of the plebs. He was consul in 488 BC which was also the same year that the Volsci, under the command of Coriolanus, marched on Rome and besieged the city.

== Bibliography ==
- Smith, Sir William (2005) [1867]. A Dictionary of Greek and Roman Biography and Mythology. By various writers. Ed. by William Smith. Illustrated by Numerous Engravings on Wood. Smith, William, Sir, ed. 1813–1893. Vol. 3 (1813–1893 ed.). Boston: Little, Brown and Co. p. 691a.

Political offices
Preceded by Gaius Julius Iullus; Publius Pinarius Mamercinus Rufus	Roman consul 488 BC with Sextus Furius	Succeeded by Titus Sicinius Sabinus; Gaius Aquillius Tuscus
