= Kritonios Crown =

4th-century BC crown

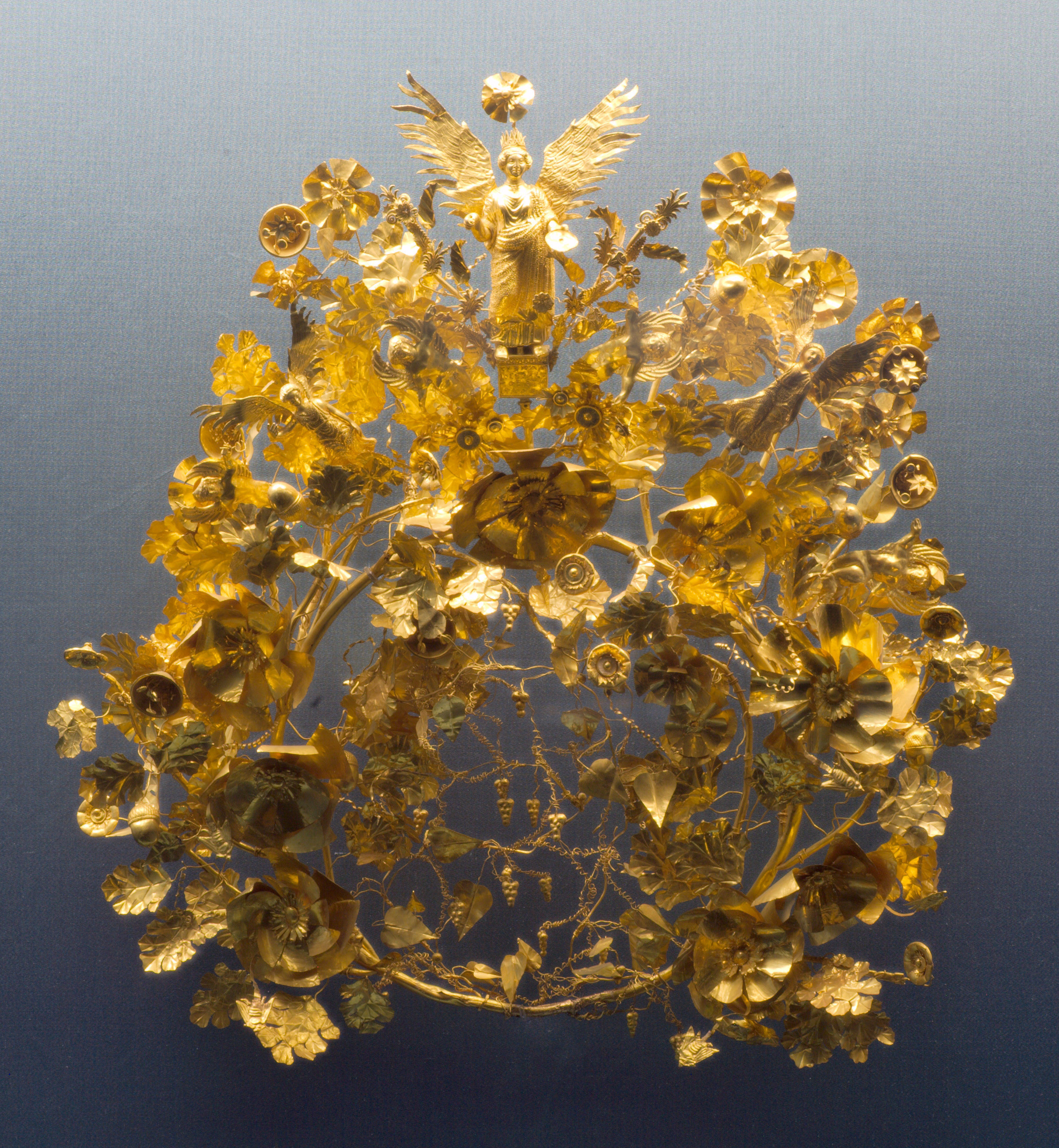
The Kritonios Crown

The Kritonios Crown is an ancient ornate golden crown or wreath dating to the 4th century BC. It was discovered in 1814 in the tomb of a man named Kritonios in Armento, Italy. The crown is now in the Staatliche Antikensammlungen, Munich, Germany.

A twig of oak forms the base, from which elements with chalices of blue enamel protrude, with intertwined patterns of convolvulus, narcissus, ivy, roses, and myrtle. The top features an image of a winged goddess. The pedestal on which the goddess stands bears the Greek inscription ΚΡΕΙΘΩΝΙΟΣ ΗΘΗΚΗ ΤΟΝ ΕΤΗΦΑΝΟΝ (Kritonios dedicated this crown). Four male genii and two draped female figures float over the flowers, pointing towards the goddess. The errors in the inscription on the crown indicate the work of a Lucanian artist who studied at Heraclea or Taranto. The style of the headgear's figures indicates a date around 350 BC.
