= Gaius Julius Iullus (consul 489 BC) =

Roman politician, consul in 489 BC

- Office: Consul (489 BC)
- Children: Gaius and Vopiscus

Gaius Julius Iullus (fl. c. 489 BC) was a Roman politician from the early Republic. He was the first from the ancient patrician clan of the Julii to attain the consulship, which he held in 489 BC as the colleague of Publius Pinarius Mamercinus Rufus.

According to Dionysius, it was during their year of office that the Volscian leader Attius Tullius provoked a confrontation with Rome. With the help of the Roman exile Coriolanus, the Volsci prepared for war and began raiding Latin territory. As planned, the impact of the Volscian operations fell more heavily on the poor, exacerbating the already tense relationship between the patricians and the plebeians. As the Senate was trying to calm the populace, a Volscian force under Coriolanus took control of the city of Circeii, which contained a Roman colony. The consuls were directed to set a watch over the city, call upon Rome's allies for help, and begin raising an army to meet the Volscian threat, but their term of office expired before these tasks could be completed. It fell to their successors to continue preparing for the inevitable confrontation with Coriolanus.

== Family ==
According to legend, the Julii were one of the noble houses that came to Rome from Alba Longa when that city was destroyed by Tullus Hostilius, the third king of Rome, but it was not until the twenty-first year of the Republic that a member of that family was elected consul. Iullus' filiation is not found in the surviving fragments of the Fasti Capitolini. If he was the father of the same Gaius Julius Iullus who was consul in 482 BC, then his father's name was Lucius. This is the interpretation given in the Dictionary of Greek and Roman Biography and Mythology, which generally follows Wilhelm Drumann's scholarship on the Julii. However, in The Magistrates of the Roman Republic, Broughton gives Gaius as the father of the consul of 489.

If Iullus was the father of Gaius, the consul of 482, then he was also the father of Vopiscus Julius Iullus, consul in 473, who shares the same filiation and must have been the younger Gaius' brother. As far as can be determined from their filiations, all of the later Julii Iuli who appear in history were descended from these two brothers. At least some classical scholars believe that the later Julii Caesares may also be descended from this family.

== Bibliography ==
- Titus Livius (Livy), Ab Urbe Condita (History of Rome).
- Dionysius of Halicarnassus, Romaike Archaiologia.
- Plutarchus, Lives of the Noble Greeks and Romans.
- William Berry, Genealogia Antiqua, or Mythological and Classical Tables, Compiled from the Best Authors on Fabulous and Ancient History, Baldwin, Cradock, and Joy, London (1816).
- Dictionary of Greek and Roman Biography and Mythology, William Smith, ed., Little, Brown and Company, Boston (1849).
- T. Robert S. Broughton, The Magistrates of the Roman Republic, American Philological Association (1952).
- Miriam Griffin, A Companion to Julius Caesar John Wiley & Sons (2009), ISBN 1444308459, ISBN 9781444308457.
- Münzer, Friedrich (1918), "Iulius 293", Realencyclopädie der classischen Altertumswissenschaft (RE, PW), volume 8, part 1, column 654.

Political offices
Preceded by Quintus Sulpicius Camerinus Cornutus; Spurius Larcius	Roman consul 489 BC with Publius Pinarius Mamercinus Rufus	Succeeded by Spurius Nautius Rutilus; Sextus Furius
