= Gaius Aquillius Tuscus =

Roman politician and general, consul in 487 BC

Gaius Aquillius Tuscus was consul of the Roman Republic in 487 BC together with Titus Sicinius Sabinus. Aquillius led the war against the Hernici. Not many details are known, but Dionysius of Halicarnassus records that he was awarded an ovation, a lesser form of triumph for his victory.

C. Ampolo has argued that Aquillius was of Etruscan origin, basing his argument in part on three wine pitchers of Etruscan origin, all bearing the name Avile Acvilnas (Latin, "Aulus Aquillius"). He has described the consul as an example of the horizontal social mobility that was common in the fifth and fourth centuries BC.

== Ancient sources ==
- Livy, Roman History 2.40
- Dionysius of Halicarnassus, Roman Antiquities, viii. 64, 65, 67

Political offices
Preceded by Spurius Nautius Rutilus; Sextus Furius	Roman consul with Titus Sicinius Sabinus; 487 BC	Succeeded by Spurius Cassius Vecellinus III; Proculus Verginius Tricostus Rutilus
