= Sextus Furius =

Roman senator, consul in 488 BC

Sextus Furius (fl. c. 488–486 BC) was a Roman politician from the early Republic, who served as consul in 488 BC alongside Spurius Nautius Rutilus. It was during their term of office that Rome was besieged by Coriolanus and the Volsci. Roman tradition credits the consuls with normal duties during the siege, as well as a raid on Volscian territory after their withdrawal.

Some sources suggest that Sextus Furius was among a group of nine tribunes (probably military tribunes) who were burnt alive in 486 BC, possibly for supporting the alleged conspiracy of the consul Spurius Cassius.

Preceded by Gaius Julius; Publius Pinarius	Roman consul 488 BC; With: Spurius Nautius Rutilus	Succeeded by Titus Sicinius; Gaius Aquillius
