= Coriolanus Taking Leave of His Family =

Painting by Anne-Louis Girodet de Roussy-Trioson

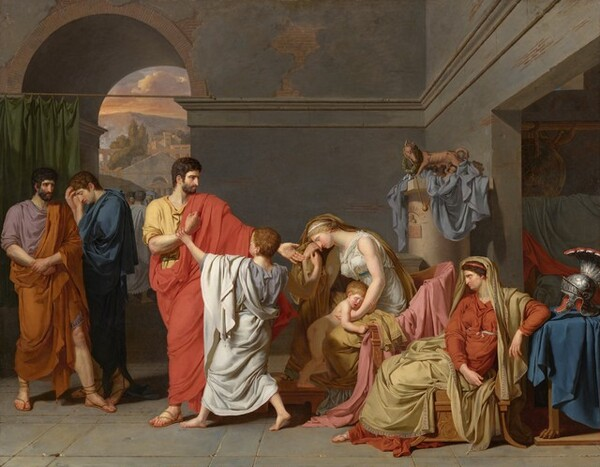
- Artist: Anne-Louis Girodet de Roussy-Trioson
- Year: 1786
- Type: Oil on canvas, history painting
- Dimensions: 114 cm × 146 cm (45 in × 57 in)
- Location: National Gallery of Art, Washington, D.C.
- Accession: 2019.169.1

Coriolanus Taking Leave of His Family is a 1786 history painting by the French artist Anne-Louis Girodet de Roussy-Trioson. It depicts a scene featuring the legendary Roman general Gnaeus Marcius Coriolanus departing from his grieving family, having been banished from the city.

The eighteen-year old Girodet, a student of Jacques-Louis David, submitted it as his entry for that year's Prix de Rome. Although unsuccessful he was able to win the prize in 1789. He moved to Rome from 1789 to 1793 to study and later became to emerge the Neoclassism used in his early works with the emerging Romantic style. Today the painting is in the collection of the National Gallery of Art in Washington, having been acquired in 2019.

== Bibliography ==
- Albertson, Gerrit. "Dans les loges: Anne-Louis Girodet's Coriolanus Taking Leave of His Family and the Grand Prix Contest." Daphne Barbour, ed., Facture. Conservation, Science, Art History 6 (2023): 90-119.
- Fehr, Burkhard & Roilos, Panagiotis (ed.) Mythogenesis, Interdiscursivity, Ritual. BRILL, 2024.
- Levey, Michael. Painting and Sculpture in France, 1700-1789. Yale University Press, 1993.
- Levitine, George. Girodet-Trioson: An Iconographical Study. Garland, 1978.
- Palmer, Allison Lee. Historical Dictionary of Romantic Art and Architecture. Rowman & Littlefield, 2019.
- Wile, Aaron. "Girodet's 'Coriolanus taking leave of his family' rediscovered." The Burlington Magazine 165 (October 2023): 1094-1105.
