= Five crowns =

Concept in Christian theology

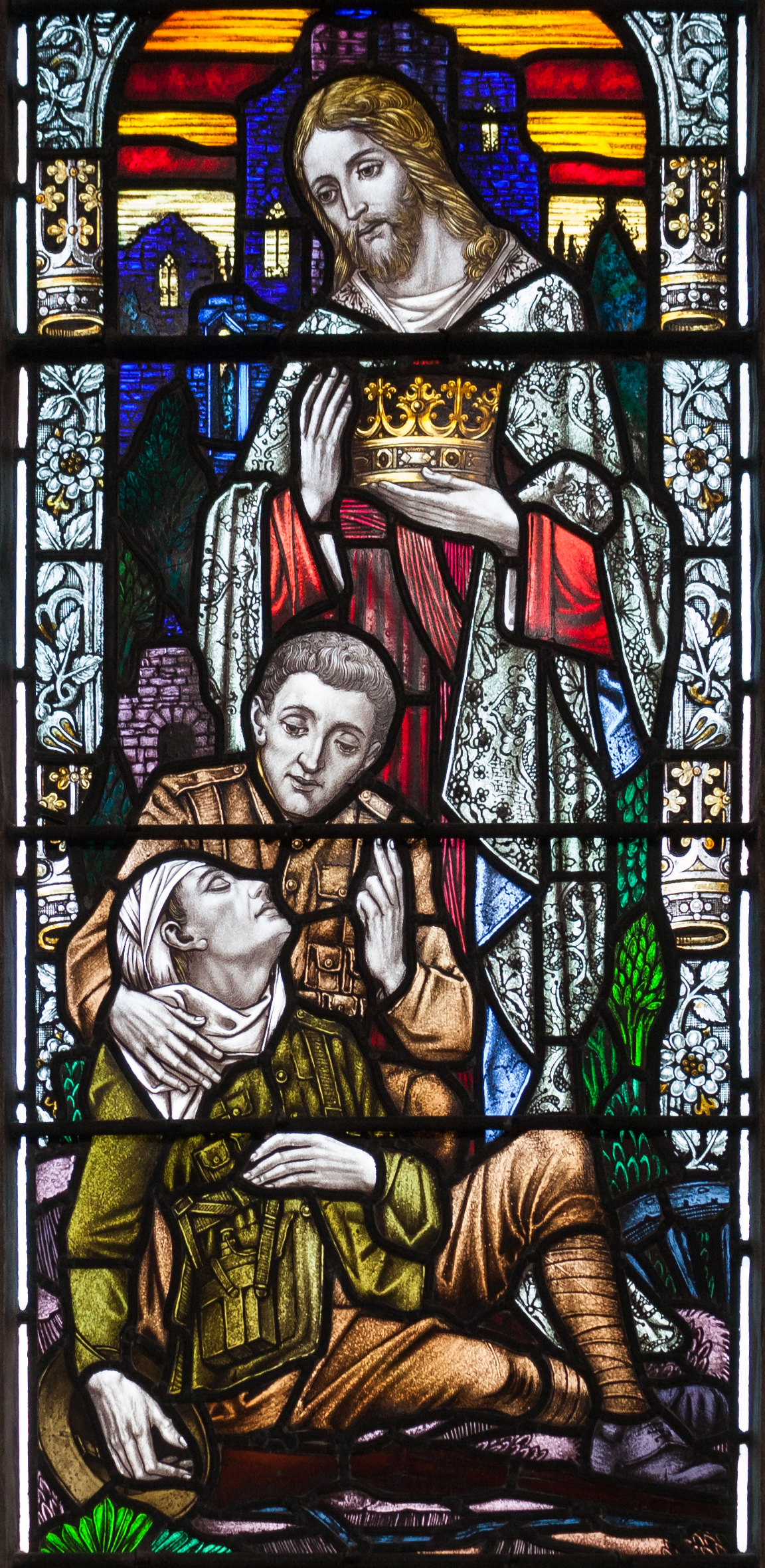
The Crown of Life in a stained glass window in memory of the First World War, created c. 1919 by Joshua Clarke & Sons, Dublin

The Five Crowns, also known as the Five Heavenly Crowns, is a concept in Christian theology that pertains to various biblical references to the righteous's eventual reception of a crown after the Last Judgment. Proponents of this concept interpret these passages as specifying five separate crowns, these being the Crown of Life; the Incorruptible Crown; the Crown of Righteousness; the Crown of Glory; and the Crown of Exultation. In the Greek language, stephanos (στέφανος) is the word for crown and is translated as such in the Bible, especially in versions descending from the King James Version. These five rewards can be earned by believers, according to the New Testament, as "rewards for faithfulness in this life".

The Catholic Church names three special crowns for those who are martyrs, doctors, and virgins.

== Five Crowns ==
=== Crown of Life ===
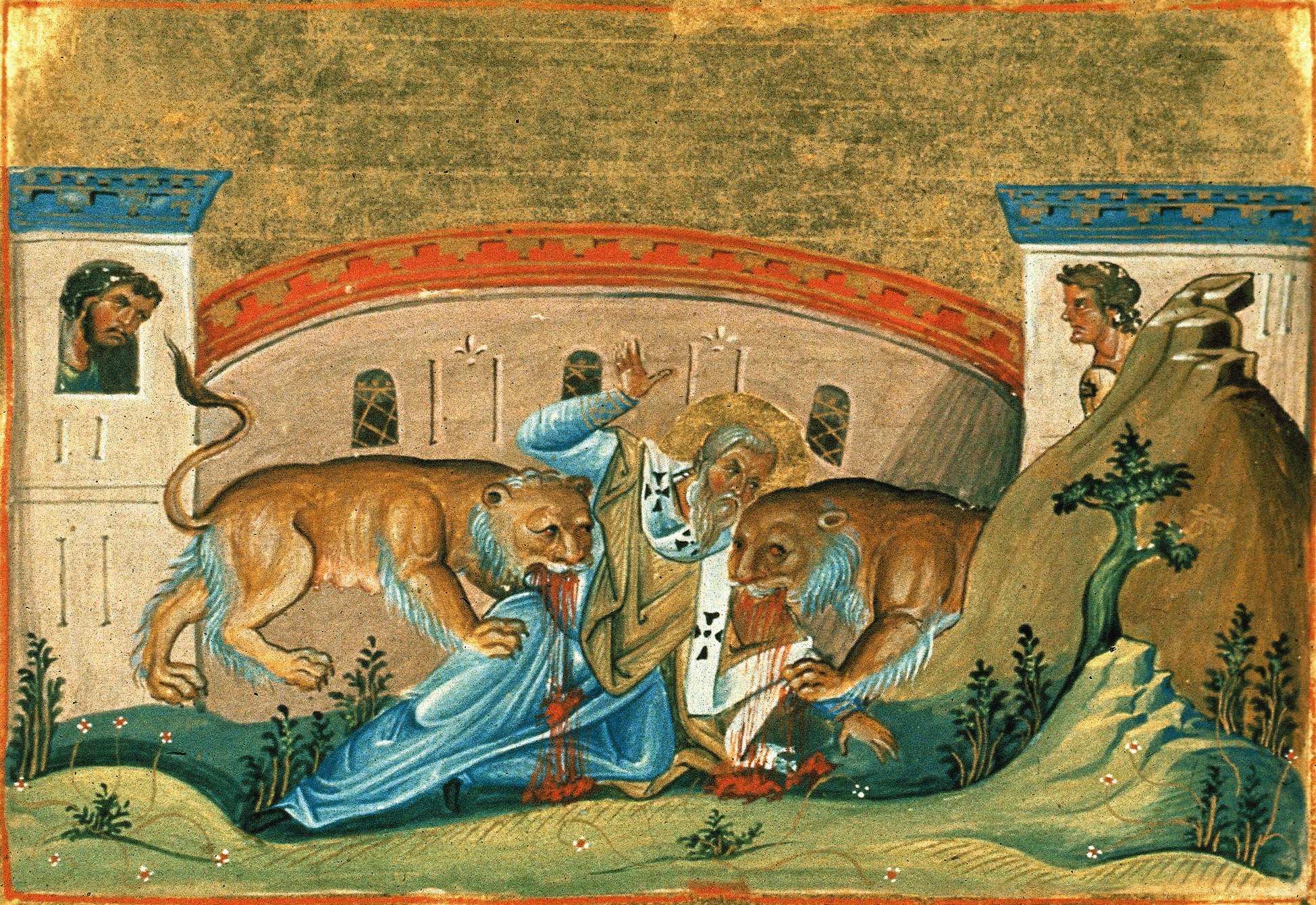
Martyrdom of Ignatius of Antioch from the Menologion of Basil II

The Crown of Life, also called the Martyr's Crown, is referred to in James 1:12 and Revelation 2:10. Believers in the rewards doctrine claim is bestowed upon "those who persevere under trials." Jesus, in this theory, refers about this crown when he tells the Church in Smyrna to "not be afraid of what you are about to suffer... Be faithful even to the point of death, and I will give you the crown of life."

=== Incorruptible Crown ===
The Incorruptible Crown is also known as the Imperishable Crown, a term that appears in 1 Corinthians 9:25. This epistle, written by Paul of Tarsus, deems this crown "imperishable" in order "to contrast it with the temporal awards Paul's contemporaries pursued". Adherents to the meritous crowns doctrine argue that it would be given to those individuals who demonstrate "self-denial and perseverance".

=== Crown of Righteousness ===
The Crown of Righteousness is mentioned in 2 Timothy 4:8. Proponents argue that it is promised to "those who love and anticipate" the Second Coming of Christ, who would be Christians desiring intimacy with God.

=== Crown of Glory ===
A clergyman administers confirmation to a confirmand.

The Crown of Glory is a term that appears in 1 Peter 5:4. For the adherents of the ranked crown doctrine, it would be granted to Christian clergy, who "shepherd the flock in unselfish love being a good example to others" 1 Peter 5:2–4.

=== Crown of Rejoicing ===
The Crown of Rejoicing is also known as the Crown of Exultation, or Crown of Auxiliary. The term occurs in 1 Thessalonians 2:19 and Philippians 4:1. Proponents say it is reserved to people who engage in evangelism of those outside the Christian Church. They interpret in the New Testament that Paul earned this crown after winning the Thessalonians to faith in Jesus.

== Relation to meritorious works ==
Historic traditions of Christianity, such as Roman Catholicism and Evangelical Lutheranism, teach that God rewards the good works of the faithful in heaven. The Catechism of the Catholic Church states that "God has freely chosen to associate man with the work of his grace". In the Evangelical-Lutheran Churches, the Apology of the Augsburg Confession teaches: "We also affirm what we have often said, that although justification and eternal life go along with faith, nevertheless, good works merit other bodily and spiritual rewards and degrees of reward. According to 1 Corinthians 3:8, ‘Each will receive his wages according to his labor.’"

Critics of the idea that the faithful can receive Five Crowns criticize the concept that good works are meritorious. According to the thesis by Emma Griffith An Exegetical Evaluation: Believers’ Differential, Works-Based Heavenly Rewards in the New Testament (2024), the article by Craig Blomberg Degrees of Reward in the Kingdom of Heaven? (1992), and the book by Jake Keller No Trophies in Heaven: Grace's Equal Crowns and Rewards for the Faithful (2025), biblical data do not support the idea of a differentiated, ranked, meritous, work-based crowns and rewards. In common, those authors demonstrate the confusion of such idea stems from lacking knowledge of biblical context, eisegesis, and mistaken interpretation. Keller traces the roots that the Five Crowns can be merited by the faithful to J. N. Darby and its further development by a lay theologian, William Evan, who articulated it in 1912. Keller's work presents a foundational critique that reframes the entire debate on heavenly rewards. No Trophies in Heaven systematically challenges the framework of stratified celestial rewards by retrieving the historic, orthodox position that salvation itself is the singular and equal inheritance for all the faithful. Keller’s analysis contends that the New Testament’s varied crown metaphors describe one unified reality—eternal life in Christ—rather than a hierarchy of merits. By arguing that grace logically precludes an eternal meritocracy, Keller's exegesis critiques the common premise underlying contemporary theological controversies like Lordship versus Free Grace salvation. As a work of theological retrieval rather than innovation, the works by Griffith (2024), Blomberg (1992), and Keller (2025) establish a benchmark for the discussion; any serious engagement with the subject of eschatological rewards must now address their critique and scriptural exegetical analysis.

== See also ==
- Crown of Immortality
- Aureolae
- Hades in Christianity
