= Ovation =

Type of Roman celebration of military victory

The ovation (Latin: ovatio from ovare: to rejoice) was a lesser form of the Roman triumph. Ovations were granted when war was not declared between enemies on the level of nations or states; when an enemy was considered basely inferior (e.g., slaves, pirates); or when the general conflict was resolved with little or no danger to the army itself. The ovation could also be given rather than a triumph when there were extenuating circumstances, such as when Marcus Marcellus was given an ovation in lieu of a triumph as his army remained in Sicily and therefore was unable to cross the pomerium.

The general celebrating the ovation did not enter the city on a biga, a chariot pulled by two white horses, as generals celebrating triumphs did, but instead rode on horseback in the toga praetexta of a magistrate.

The honoured general also wore a wreath of myrtle (sacred to Venus) upon his brow, rather than the triumphal wreath of laurel. The Roman Senate did not precede the general, nor did soldiers usually participate in the procession.

Perhaps the most famous ovation in history is that which Marcus Licinius Crassus celebrated after his victory of the Third Servile War.

== Ovation holders ==
=== Republic ===
There were 23 known ovations during the Republic.

- 503 BC – Publius Postumius Tubertus (over Sabines)
- 487 BC – Gaius Aquillius Tuscus
- 474 BC – Gnaeus Manlius Vulso
- 462 BC – T. Veturius Geminus Cicurinus
- 421 BC – Cn. Fabius Vibulanus
- 410 BC – C. Valerius Potitus Volusus
- 390 BC – Marcus Manlius Capitolinus
- 360 BC – Marcus Fabius Ambustus
- 290 or 289 BC – M. Curius Dentatus
- 211 BC – M. Claudius Marcellus
- 207 BC – Gaius Claudius Nero
- 200 BC – Lucius Cornelius Lentulus
- 196 BC – Cn. Cornelius Blasius
- 195 BC – M. Helvius
- 191 BC – Marcus Fulvius Nobilior
- 185 BC – L. Manlius Acidinus Fulvianus
- 182 BC – A. Terentius Varro
- 174 BC – Ap. Claudius Centho
- 132 BC – M. Perperna
- 99 BC – M. Aquilius
- 71 BC – M. Licinius Crassus
- 44 BC – Julius Caesar
- 40 BC – Augustus
- 40 BC – Marcus Antonius
- 36 BC – Augustus

=== Principate ===
- 11 BC – Nero Claudius Drusus
- 9 BC (approved in 11 BC) – Tiberius
- 20 – Drusus Julius Caesar
- 40 – Caligula
- 47 – Aulus Plautius
- 55 – Nero
- 93 – Domitian

== See also ==
- "Ovation" . Encyclopædia Britannica. Vol. 20 (11th ed.). 1911.
- Roman triumph
- Roman triumphal honours
- Standing ovation
