= Gnaeus Marcius Coriolanus =

5th-century BCE Roman general

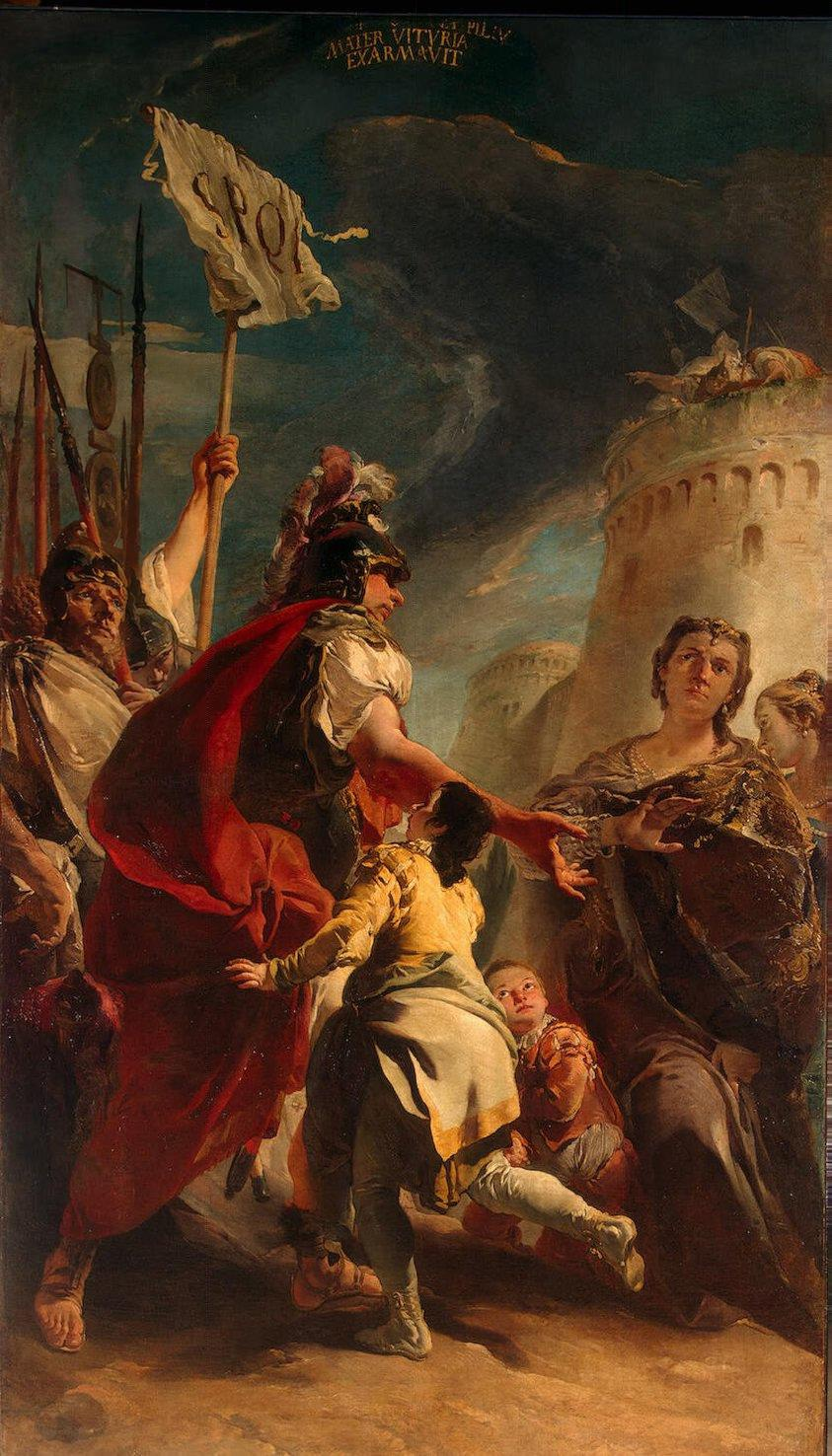
Coriolanus at the Walls of Rome by Giovanni Battista Tiepolo

Gnaeus Marcius Coriolanus was a Roman general who is said to have lived in the 5th century BC. He received his toponymic cognomen "Coriolanus" following his courageous actions during a Roman siege of the Volscian city of Corioli. He was subsequently exiled from Rome, and led troops of Rome's enemy the Volsci to besiege the city.

In later ancient times, it was generally accepted by historians that Coriolanus was a real historical individual, and a consensus narrative story of his life appeared, retold by leading historians such as Livy, Plutarch, and Dionysius of Halicarnassus. More recent scholarship has cast doubt on the historicity of Coriolanus, with some portraying him as either a wholly legendary figure or at least disputing the accuracy of the conventional story of his life or the timing of the events.

The story is the basis for the tragedy of Coriolanus, written by William Shakespeare, and a number of other works, including Beethoven's Coriolan Overture (based not on Shakespeare but on the play Coriolan by Heinrich Joseph von Collin).

== Consensus biography ==
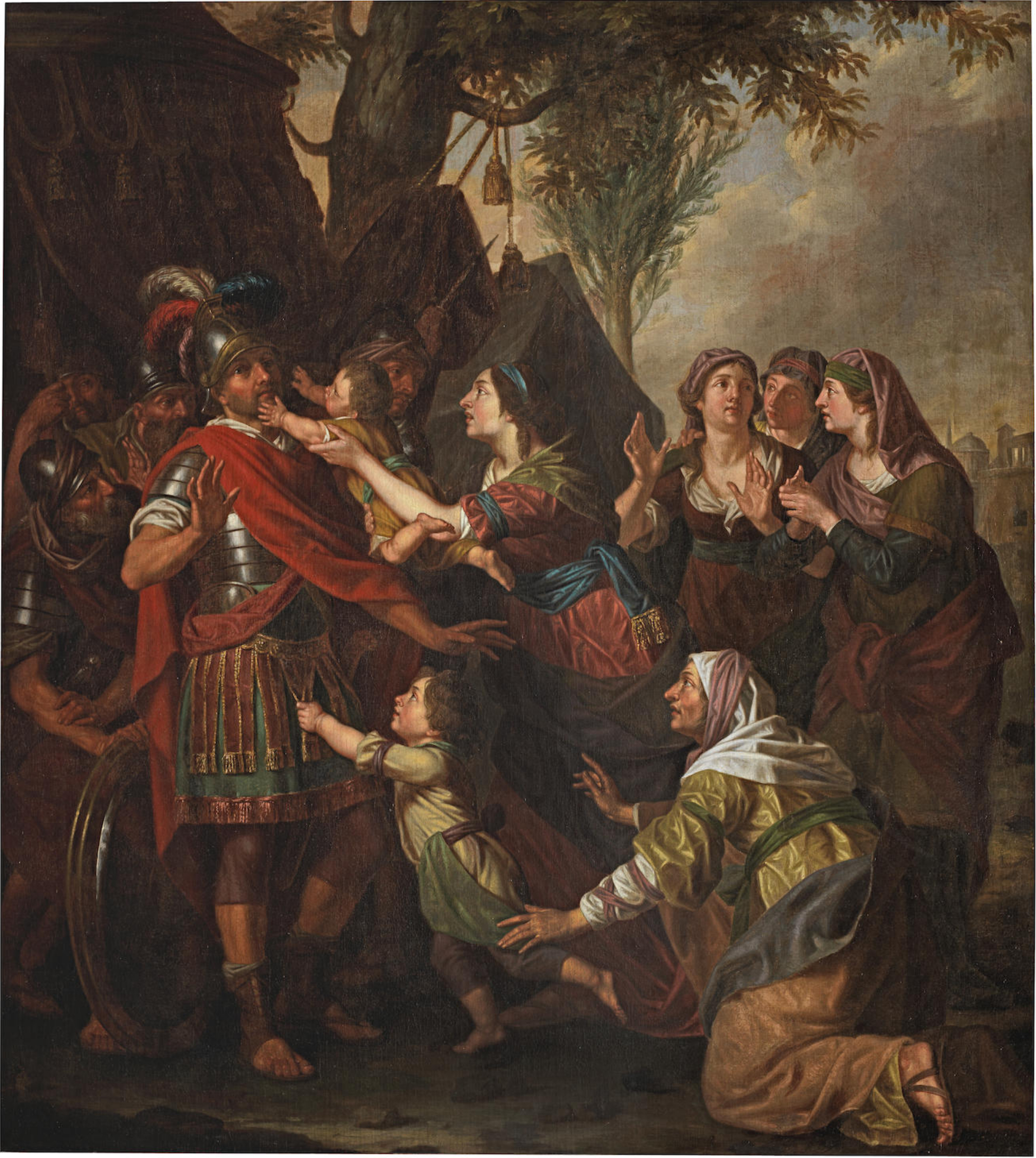
Coriolanus's mother pleads with her son not to lay siege to Rome. Painting by Jan Erasmus Quellinus

=== First name ===
Coriolanus's first name is traditionally given as Gnaeus; this was the form used by the historian Livy and by later Latin authors. The Greek author Dionysius of Halicarnassus, in contrast, calls him Gaius, which was followed by Plutarch. Ogilvie suggests Dionysius may have followed a separate tradition originated from the annalist Licinius Macer.

In English, Thomas North's sixteenth-century English translation of Plutarch's Parallel Lives, The Lives of the Noble Grecians and Romans, was a primary source for Shakespeare's Coriolanus; in both texts, the name is given as Caius.

=== Siege of Corioli ===
Coriolanus came to fame as a young man serving in the army of the consul Postumus Cominius in 493 BC during the siege of the Volscian town of Corioli. While the Romans were focused on the siege, another Volscian force arrived from Antium and attacked the Romans, and at the same time the soldiers of Corioli launched a sally. Marcius held watch at the time of the Volscian attack. He quickly gathered a small force of Roman soldiers to fight against the Volscians who had sallied forth from Corioli. Not only did he repel the enemy, but he also charged through the town gates and then began setting fire to some of the houses bordering the town wall. The citizens of Corioli cried out, and the whole Volscian force was dispirited and defeated by the Romans. The town was captured, and Marcius gained the cognomen Coriolanus.

=== Conflict and exile ===
In 491 BC, two years after Coriolanus's victory over the Volscians, Rome was recovering from a grain shortage. A significant quantity of grain was imported from Sicily, and the senate debated the manner in which it should be distributed to the commoners. Coriolanus advocated that grain should be provided only upon the reversal of the pro-plebeian political reforms arising from the first secessio plebis in 494 BC.

The senate thought Coriolanus's proposal was too harsh. The populace were incensed at Coriolanus's proposal, and the tribunes put him on trial. The senators argued for the acquittal of Coriolanus, or at the least a merciful sentence. Coriolanus refused to attend on the day of his trial, and was convicted.

=== Defection to the Volsci ===
Coriolanus fled to the Volsci in exile. He was received and treated kindly, and resided with the Volscian leader Attius Tullus Aufidius.

Plutarch's account of his defection tells that Coriolanus donned a disguise and entered the home of Aufidius as a supplicant.

Coriolanus and Aufidius then persuaded the Volscians to break their truce with Rome and raise an army to invade. Livy recounts that Aufidius tricked the Roman senate into expelling the Volsci from Rome during the celebration of the Great Games, thereby stirring up ill-will among the Volsci.

Coriolanus and Aufidius led the Volscian army against Roman towns, colonies and allies. Roman colonists were expelled from Circeii. They then retook the formerly Volscian towns of Satricum, Longula, Pollusca and Corioli. Then the Volscian army took Lavinium, then Corbio, Vitellia, Trebia, Lavici, and Pedum.

From there the Volsci marched on Rome and besieged it. The Volscians initially camped at the Cluilian trench, five miles outside Rome, and ravaged the countryside. Coriolanus directed the Volsci to target plebeian properties and to spare those of the patricians.

The consuls, now Spurius Nautius and Sextus Furius, readied the defences of the city. But the plebeians implored them to sue for peace. The senate was convened, and it was agreed to send supplicants to the enemy. Initially ambassadors were sent, but Coriolanus sent back a negative response. The ambassadors were sent to the Volsci a second time, but were refused entry to the enemy camp. Next priests, in their regalia, were sent by the Romans, but achieved nothing more than had the ambassadors.

Then Coriolanus's mother Veturia (known as Volumnia in Shakespeare's play) and his wife Volumnia (known as Virgilia in Shakespeare's play) and his two sons, together with the matrons of Rome, went out to the Volscian camp and implored Coriolanus to cease his attack on Rome. Coriolanus was overcome by their pleas, and moved the Volscian camp back from the city, ending the siege. Rome honoured the service of these women by the erection of a temple dedicated to Fortuna (a female deity).

Coriolanus's fate after this point is unclear, but it seems he took no further part in the war.

One version says that Coriolanus retired to Aufidius's home town of Antium. Coriolanus had committed acts of disloyalty to both Rome and the Volsci, and Aufidius raised support to have Coriolanus first put on trial by the Volscians, and then assassinated before the trial had ended.

Plutarch's tale of Coriolanus's appeal to Aufidius is quite similar to a tale from the life of Themistocles, a leader of the Athenian democracy who was a contemporary of Coriolanus. During Themistocles's exile from Athens, he travelled to the home of Admetus, King of the Molossians, a man who was his personal enemy. Themistocles came to Admetus in disguise and appealed to him as a fugitive, just as Coriolanus appealed to Aufidius. Themistocles, however, never attempted military retaliation against Athens.

== Modern skepticism ==
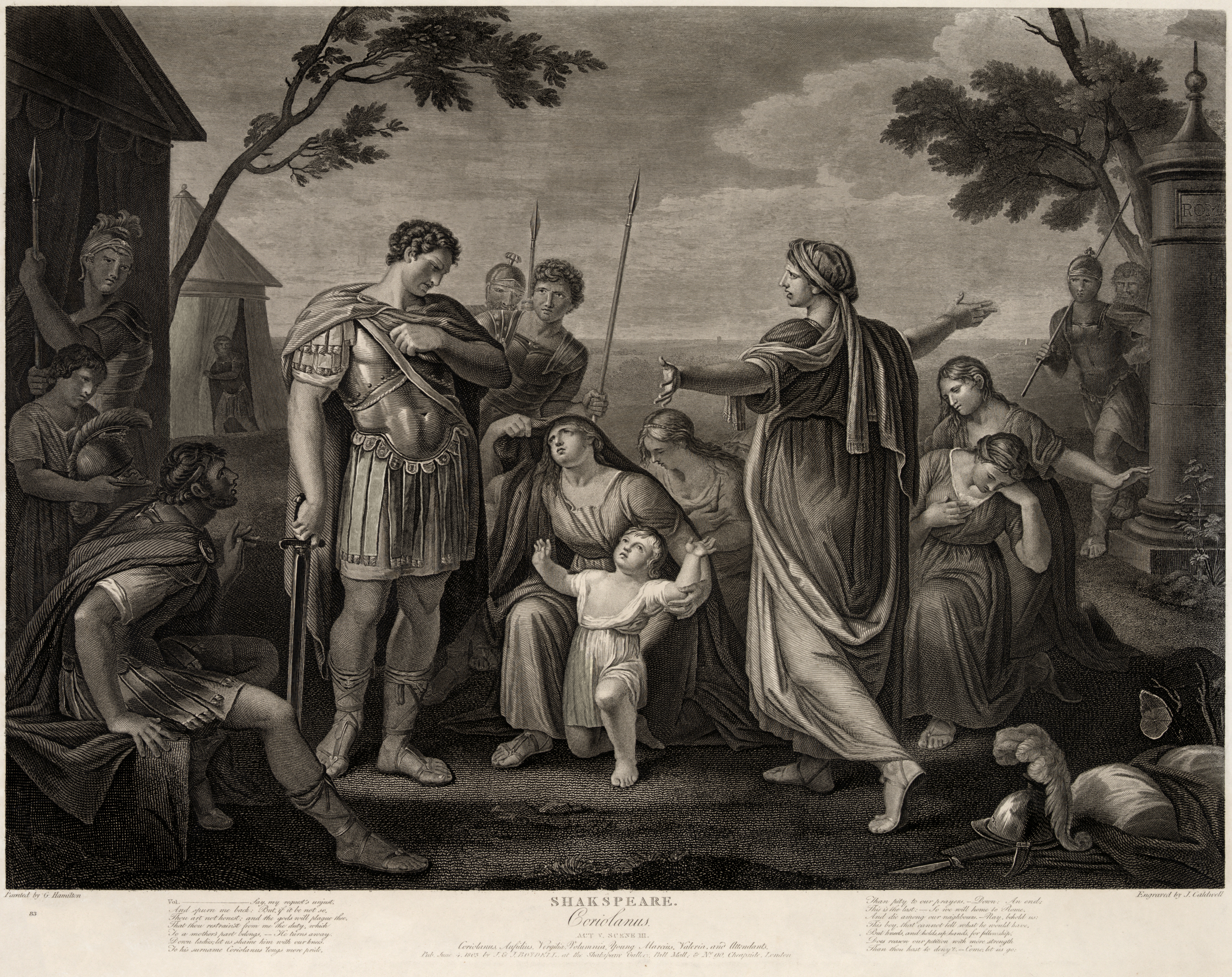
Act V, Scene III of Shakespeare's Coriolanus. Engraved by James Caldwell from a painting by Gavin Hamilton.

Some modern scholars question parts of the story of Coriolanus. It is notable that accounts of Coriolanus's life are first found in works from the third century BC, some two hundred years after Coriolanus's life, and there are few authoritative historical records prior to the Gallic sack of Rome in 390 BC. Whether or not Coriolanus himself is a historical figure, the saga preserves a genuine popular memory of the dark, unhappy decades of the early 5th century BC when the Volscians overran Latium and threatened the very existence of Rome.

== Cultural references ==
Shakespeare's Coriolanus is the last of his "Roman plays". Its portrayal of the hero has led to a long tradition of political interpretation of Coriolanus as an anti-populist, or even proto-fascist leader. Bertolt Brecht's version of Coriolanus (1951) stresses this aspect. Shakespeare's play also forms the basis of the 2011 motion picture Coriolanus, starring and directed by Ralph Fiennes, in which Coriolanus is the protagonist.

John Dennis's play The Invader of His Country was staged at the Drury Lane Theatre in 1719. Inspired by Shakespeare's work, it made reference to the recent Jacobite uprisings against the Hanoverian Succession.

Heinrich Joseph von Collin's 1804 play Coriolan portrayed him in the context of German romantic ideas of the tragic hero. Ludwig van Beethoven’s 1807 Coriolan Overture was written for a production of the von Collin play.

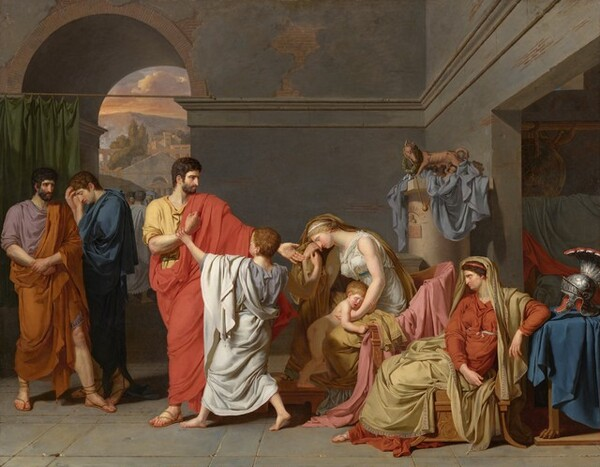
Coriolanus Taking Leave of His Family by Anne-Louis Girodet de Roussy-Trioson, 1786

T. S. Eliot wrote a sequence of poems in 1931 entitled "Coriolan".

Thunder of Battle is a 1964 Italian film based on the legend of Coriolanus.

Steven Saylor's 2007 novel Roma: A Novel of Ancient Rome presents Coriolanus as a plebeian, the child of a patrician mother and plebeian father. His attitudes toward the changes occurring in Rome during his lifetime are reflective of what has been described. He achieves Senatorial status thanks to his military valour and connections. When he calls for the abolition of the office of tribune, he becomes a target of the plebeians and their representatives. He flees before the trial which would ruin him and his family socially and financially, and seeks the alliance with the Volsci described above. His military campaign against Rome is successful and his forces are approaching the walls of the city until the appeal of the Roman women, including his patrician mother and his wife. When he orders his troops to withdraw, he is killed by them.

The 48 Laws of Power uses Coriolanus as an example of violating Law no. 4: "Always Say Less Than Necessary", citing his constant insulting of the plebeians as the reason for his exile.

In Suzanne Collins's novel series The Hunger Games the lead antagonist is named Coriolanus Snow. The prequel, The Ballad of Songbirds and Snakes, focuses solely on Coriolanus Snow, and Collins then references the similarities between the historical Coriolanus and the fictional Coriolanus.
