= Lucius Julius Iulus =

Lucius Julius Iulus may refer to:

- Lucius Julius Iulus (consular tribune 401 BC)
- Lucius Julius Iulus (consular tribune 403 BC)
- Lucius Julius Iulus (consul 430 BC)
- Lucius Julius Iulus (consular tribune 388 BC)
