= Julia gens =

Ancient Roman family

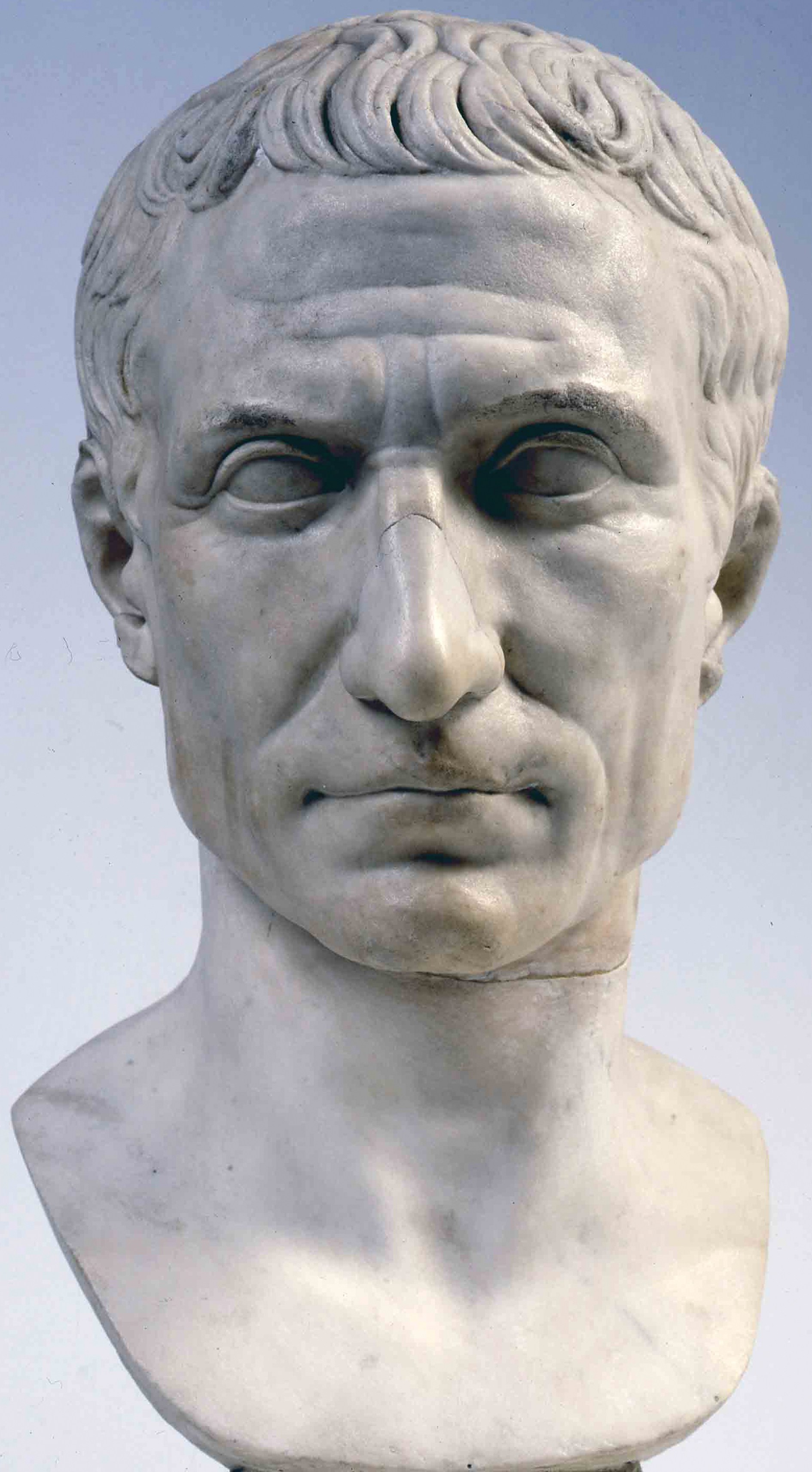
Bust of Caesar, 44–30 BC, Museo Pio-Clementino, Vatican Museums

The gens Julia was one of the most prominent patrician families of ancient Rome. From the early decades of the Republic, members of this gens served in the highest offices of the Roman state, beginning with Gaius Julius Iulus, consul in 489 BC. However, the Julii are perhaps best known for Gaius Julius Caesar, the dictator and adoptive father of the emperor Augustus, through whom the name was passed to the Julio-Claudian dynasty of the first century AD. The nomen Julius became very common in imperial times, as the descendants of persons enrolled as citizens under the early emperors began to make their mark in history.

== Origin ==
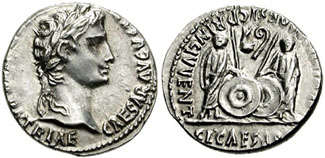
Denarius issued under Augustus from the mint at Lugdunum (Lyon, France), showing Gaius and Lucius Caesar standing facing on the reverse (circa 2 BC – AD 14)

According to Roman tradition, the Julii were among the Alban families brought to Rome when their city was destroyed by Tullus Hostilius, the third Roman king, who enrolled them among the patricians and accorded them seats in the Roman Senate. Diodorus Siculus reported that the Julii had held the position of Rex Sacrorum at Alba Longa, the result of a compromise with the Silvii, who held the kingship. Some scholars have pointed to this as evidence of dual kingship in the earliest period of various cities of Latium, including Rome and Lanuvium, which also had the post of Rex Sacrorum.

A seemingly contradictory tradition places the Julii at Rome even earlier, following the death of Romulus. A certain Proculus Julius is reported to have witnessed Romulus descending from the heavens, bidding the Romans not weep for his loss, but to take up his worship as the god Quirinus. However, as this story concerns a miraculous event, and might have been influenced by the fame of the Julii in later times, it cannot be regarded as evidence of the period that the family first settled at Rome.

The Julii were also connected to Bovillae from an early period, some of them possibly having settled there after the fall of Alba Longa. An altar inscription in the theatre of Bovillae, dating from around the beginning of the first century BC, speaks of the Julii carrying out sacrifices according to the Alban rites. In imperial times the emperor Tiberius dedicated a sacrarium, or chapel, to the Julii at Bovillae, alongside a statue of Augustus.

In the later Republic, it was fashionable for aristocratic families to claim descent from the gods and heroes of Greek and Roman myth. The Julii claimed descent from Iulus, said to be the same person as Ascanius, the son of Aeneas, and founder of Alba Longa. In Greek myth, Aeneas was the son of Venus and the Trojan prince Anchises. The traditions upon which these claims were based were not always clear; the historian Livy was unsure whether to regard Iulus and Ascanius as the same person, or perhaps two brothers—one the son of Creüsa, Aeneas' first wife, lost in the sack of Troy—and the other the son of Lavinia, the daughter of Latinus, whom Aeneas married after landing in Italy. The late Roman grammarian Servius went to some effort to prove the identity of Ascanius and Iulus through etymology.

The importance attached to their mythic ancestry may have served a further purpose: after their initial prominence under the early Republic, the Julii sank into obscurity, and they are hardly mentioned for a century and a half beginning in the mid-fourth century BC. When at last they emerged and once again began to assume positions of importance, emphasizing their ostensible connections with Rome's foundation myths might have helped to restore their prestige. As he rose to prominence in the Roman state, Caesar regularly alluded to these myths, notably doing so when speaking at the funeral of his aunt Julia, and using Venus Genetrix as the watchword for his soldiers at Pharsalus and Munda. Coins of the Julii bear the likeness of Venus, and Roman writers willingly readily furthered a myth that served to glorify the emperors.

== Praenomina ==
The Julii were amongst the most conservative patrician families in terms of praenomina. With only rare exceptions, they limited themselves to just three names: Lucius, Gaius, and Sextus, all of which were common throughout Roman history. The consular fasti supply two others, evidently used among the early Julii: Vopiscus was borne by the consul of 473 BC, and he in turn had a son, Spurius. Vopiscus was evidently an old praenomen that had fallen out of use, and is otherwise found only as a surname. Spurius was common enough during the early Republic, but was scarce in later periods, preserved chiefly by a few families in which it was traditional. Livy also gives Gnaeus as the praenomen of Gaius Julius Mento, consul in 431 BC.

Proculus, borne by the legendary figure who reportedly witnessed the apotheosis of Romulus, was another old praenomen that, though uncommon, was still in general use during the early Republic. Like Vopiscus, in later times it occurs as a cognomen. It is also possible that Iulus or Iullus, the name from which the Julii derived their gentilicium, was originally a praenomen. Perhaps with this reason in mind, Mark Antony, the friend and colleague of Caesar, and who was descended from the Julii, named one of his sons Iullus.

Various praenomina occur in imperial times, particularly in the imperial family, which made a habit of exchanging ordinary praenomina for titles and surnames. Other Julii are found with praenomina such as Gnaeus, Marcus, and Tiberius, but many of these were not descended from the patrician Julii of the Republic, but belonged to plebeian families, descended from freedmen or newly-enrolled citizens, who typically assumed the nomina of their patrons.

== Branches and cognomina ==
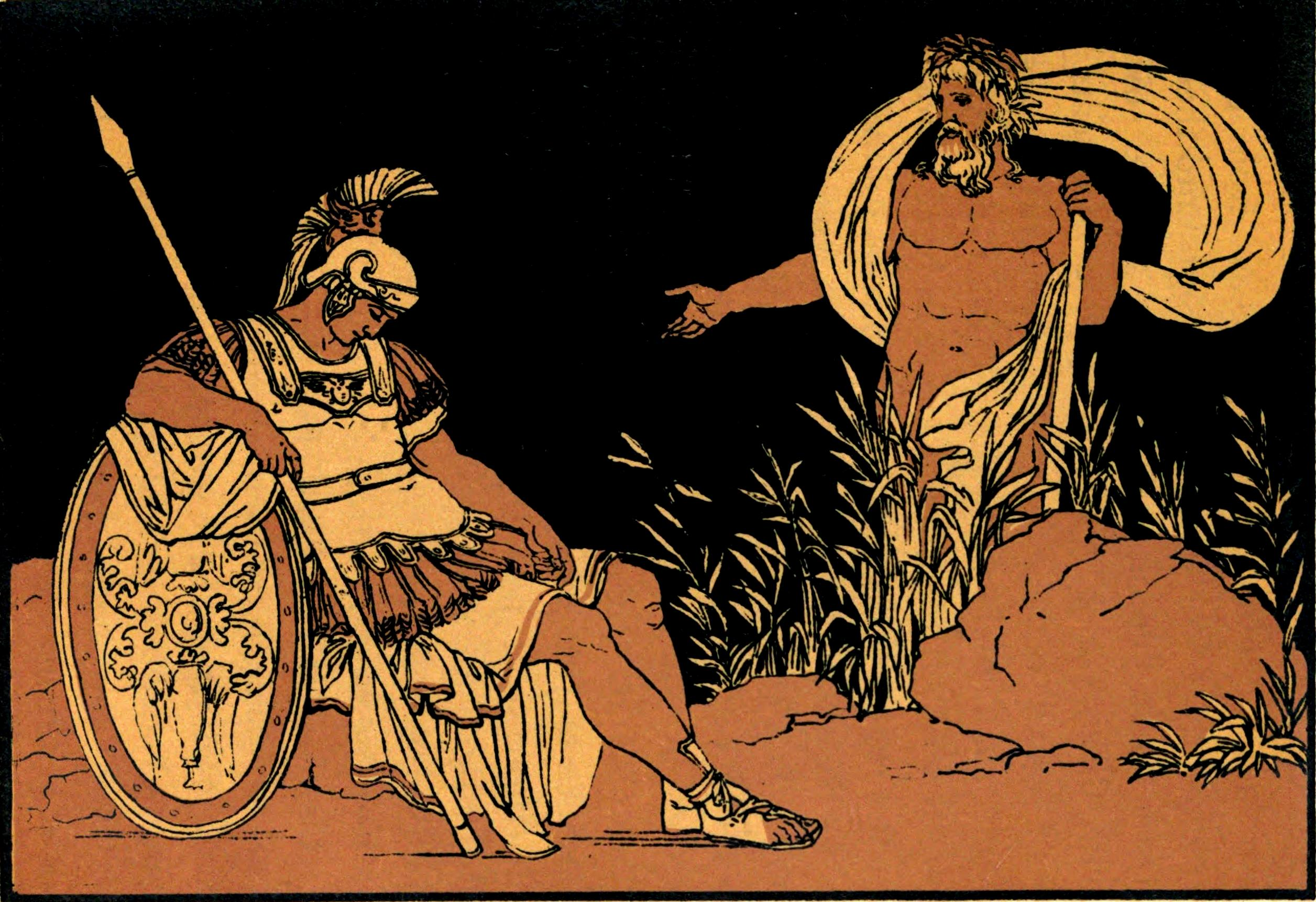
Aeneas, legendary ancestor of the Julii, with the god of the Tiber

The only cognomina of the Julii under the Republic were Iulus or Iullus, Mento, Libo, and Caesar. Of these all but Libo are known to have belonged to patrician members of this gens. The status of Libo is uncertain, but he may have been a descendant of the Julii Iuli, and perhaps an ancestor of the Caesares, in which case he would also have been a patrician. On coins, we find the surnames Caesar and Bursio, of which the latter belonged to a moneyer of the late Republic, not mentioned in Roman writers. Other surnames occur in imperial times, but it is unknown which if any of these belonged to descendants of the patrician Julii.

Over the course of centuries, the nomen Julius was adopted by countless persons as they obtained Roman citizenship, without any connection to the original Republican gens. Eventually the distinction between praenomen, nomen, and cognomen was lost, and Julius was treated much like a personal name, which it ultimately became. The Latin form is common in many languages, but other familiar forms exist, including Giulio (Italian), Julio (Spanish), Jules (French), Júlio (Portuguese), Iuliu (Romanian) and Юлий (Yuliy, Bulgarian and Russian).

=== Iullus ===
Iullus, also written as Iulus and Jullus, was the surname of the eldest branch of the Julii to appear in Roman history. At least in later times, this name was connected with Iulus, the son of Aeneas, or in some versions, the son of Ascanius and grandson of Aeneas. At least one of the Latin grammarians connected the name with Jupiter, explaining that the Latins called Ascanius a son of Jupiter. In this explanation Iulus perhaps originated as a diminutive of Dius, which seems etymologically possible. Chase supposed that it might have been an ancient praenomen. Iullus seems to be the older written form, but Iulus was popularized by Vergil in the Aeneid, and is the form used in the Fasti.

The Julii Iulli first appear in 489 BC, when Gaius Julius Iullus was consul, and for the next century they filled the highest offices of the Roman state. The last of the Iulli to appear in history, also named Gaius Julius Iullus, was nominated dictator in 352 BC, in an attempt to procure the election of two patrician consuls in violation of the lex Licinia Sextia. This would seem to indicate that the Julii Iulli at this period belonged to the hard-line faction of the old aristocracy, and that their decline and disappearance from history was due to the rise of a coalition between the newly-empowered plebeian nobility and those patricians who were willing to work with them.

=== Mento ===
This surname belonged to Gaius (or Gnaeus) Julius Mento, consul in 431 BC. At this period, no plebeian Julii are known, and all consuls are thought to have been patricians, (Note: Traditionally, no plebeians held the consulship prior to the passage of the lex Licinia Sextia in 367 BC, but scholars have long noted the presence of "plebeian" names in the histories and consular fasti from the beginning of the Republic down to 445 BC; but the number of these becomes vanishingly small by 450, and none of the consuls between 445 and 366 appear to have been plebeians.) so the authorities are agreed that Mento was one of the patrician Julii, but there is no evidence of where he fit in the family.

=== Libo ===
Lucius Julius Libo, consul in 267 BC, is the only member of this gens known to have held high office during the century and a half between the last of the Julii Iuli and the first of the Julii Caesares. Chase translates his surname as "sprinkler", deriving it from libare, and suggests that it might originally have signified the libation pourer at religious ceremonies. His filiation in the fasti indicates that his father and grandfather were both named Lucius, but we do not know whether they bore the surname Libo, or some other. Some scholars have supposed that Libo was descended from the Julii Iuli, and that Lucius, the father of Sextus Julius Caesar, was his son; but the evidence is very slight.

=== Caesar ===
The Dictionary of Greek and Roman Biography and Mythology says this of the cognomen Caesar:

It is uncertain which member of the Julia gens first obtained the surname of Caesar, but the first who occurs in history is Sextus Julius Caesar, praetor in BC 208. The origin of the name is equally uncertain. Spartianus, in his life of Aelius Verus, mentions four different opinions respecting its origin:

1. That the word signified an elephant in the language of the Moors, and was given as a surname to one of the Julii because he had killed an elephant.
2. That it was given to one of the Julii because he had been cut (caesus) out of his mother's womb after her death; or
3. Because he had been born with a great quantity of hair (caesaries) on his head; or
4. Because he had azure-colored (caesii) eyes of an almost supernatural kind.

Of these opinions, the third, which is also given by Festus, seems to come nearest the truth. Caesar and caesaries are both probably connected with the Sanskrit kêsa, "hair", and it is quite in accordance with the Roman custom for a surname to be given to an individual from some peculiarity in his personal appearance. The second opinion, which seems to have been the most popular one with the ancient writers, arose without doubt from a false etymology. With respect to the first, which was the one adopted, says Spartianus, by the most learned men, it is impossible to disprove it absolutely, as we know next to nothing of the ancient Moorish language; but it has no inherent probability in it; and the statement of Servius is undoubtedly false, that the grandfather of the dictator obtained the surname on account of killing an elephant with his own hand in Africa, as there were several of the Julii with this name before his time.

An inquiry into the etymology of this name is of some interest, as no other name has ever obtained such celebrity—"clarum et duraturum cum aeternitate mundi nomen." It was assumed by Augustus as the adopted son of the dictator, and was by Augustus handed down to his adopted son Tiberius. It continued to be used by Caligula, Claudius, and Nero, as members either by adoption or female descent of Caesar's family; but though the family became extinct with Nero, succeeding emperors still retained it as part of their titles, and it was the practice to prefix it to their own name, as for instance, Imperator Caesar Domitianus Augustus. When Hadrian adopted Aelius Verus, he allowed the latter to take the title of Caesar; and from this time, though the title of Augustus continued to be confined to the reigning prince, that of Caesar was also granted to the second person in the state and the heir presumptive to the throne.

Drumann, citing the same sources, reached a different conclusion, believing that the story of an ancestor of the family having slain an elephant to be the most likely explanation. Drumann admitted that too little was known of the Moorish language to be sure, and that in any case it could not have been the dictator's grandfather, as some claimed, because the surname had already been borne for several generations before this. However, he notes that the elephant became a potent symbol when the Romans first encountered them during the Punic Wars, the period in which the surname first appears. Furthermore, Caesar issued coins bearing the image of an elephant, and included elephants in his processions, though this could also have related to Caesar's military campaigns in Africa. Drumann dismisses the explanations that the name derived from thick hair or blue eyes, and notes that the popular story of Caesar having given his name to the Caesarean section was false, since—besides having several generations of Caesars before him—his mother, Aurelia, was still alive when he first held public office.

== Members ==
This list includes abbreviated praenomina. For an explanation of this practice, see filiation.

- Proculus Julius, a legendary figure who announced the apotheosis of Romulus to the Roman people, circa 716 BC.

=== Julii Iulli ===
- Lucius Julius, father of Gaius Julius Iullus, the consul of 489 BC.
- Gaius Julius L. f. Iullus, consul in 489 BC.
- Gaius Julius C. f. L. n. Iullus, consul in 482 BC, and one of the decemvirs in 451.
- Vopiscus Julius C. f. L. n. Iullus, consul in 473 BC.
- Gaius Julius C. f. C. n. Iullus, consul in 447 and 435 BC.
- Spurius Julius Vop. f. C. n. Iullus, father of the consular tribunes of 408, 405, and 403 BC, according to the Capitoline Fasti.
- Lucius Julius Vop. f. C. n. Iullus, consular tribune in 438, and consul in 430 BC.
- Sextus Julius Iulus, consular tribune in 424 BC.
- Gaius Julius Sp. f. Vop. n. Iullus, consular tribune in 408 and 405 BC, and censor in 393.
- Lucius Julius Sp. f. Vop. n. Iullus, consular tribune in 403 BC, continued the siege against Veii.
- Lucius Julius L. f. Vop. n. Iullus, consular tribune in 401 and 397 BC.
- Lucius Julius Iullus, consular tribune in 388 and 379 BC.
- Gaius Julius Iullus, nominated dictator in 352 BC, ostensibly to carry on war against the Etruscans, but in fact to carry the election of two patricians in the consular comitia, in violation of the lex Licinia Sextia.

=== Julii Mentones ===
- Gaius Julius Mento, consul in 431 BC.
- Gaius Julius Mento, a rhetorician, cited by Seneca.

=== Julii Libones ===
- Lucius Julius (Libo?), the grandfather of Lucius Julius Libo, consul in 267 BC.
- Lucius Julius L. f. (Libo?), the father of Libo, the consul of 267 BC.
- Lucius Julius L. f. L. n. Libo, consul in 267 BC, triumphed over the Sallentini.

=== Julii Caesares ===
- Lucius Julius (Caesar?), father of the praetor of 208 BC.
- Sextus Julius (L. f.) Caesar, praetor in 208 BC, obtained the province of Sicilia, father of the praetor of 166 BC and the consul of 157 BC.
- Lucius Julius (Sex. f. L. n.) Caesar, praetor in 183 BC, had the province of Gallia Cisalpina.
- Lucius Julius (L. f. Sex. n.) Caesar, praetor in 166 BC.
- Sextus Julius Sex. f. L. n. Caesar, consul in 157 BC.
- Gaius Julius (Sex. f. L. n.) Caesar, great-grandfather of the dictator.
- Sextus Julius (Sex. f. Sex. n.) Caesar, praetor urbanus in 123 BC; he is probably the same Sextus Julius Caesar who was triumvir monetalis about this time.
- Lucius Julius Sex. f. Sex. n. Caesar, father of the consul of 90 BC, married Popillia, widow of Quintus Lutatius Catulus, and mother of Quintus Lutatius Catulus, consul in 102 BC.
- Gaius Julius (C. f. Sex. n.) Caesar, grandfather of the dictator, married Marcia.
- Lucius Julius L. f. Sex. n. Caesar, consul in 90 BC, during the Social War, and censor in 89.
- Julia L. f. L. n., wife of Marcus Antonius Creticus, and mother of Mark Antony, the triumvir. After his death, she married Publius Cornelius Lentulus Sura, one of Catiline's conspirators.
- Gaius Julius L. f. Sex. n. Caesar Strabo Vopiscus, a notable orator and poet, proscribed and put to death by Marius and Cinna in 87 BC.
- Gaius Julius C. f. (C. n.) Caesar, praetor, governor of Asia, and father of the dictator, married Aurelia.
- Lucius Julius L. f. L. n. Caesar, consul in 64 BC.
- Lucius Julius L. f. L. n. Caesar, a partisan of Pompeius during the Civil War.
- Julia L. f. L. n., daughter of the consul of 64 BC.
- Julia C. f. (C. n.), aunt of the dictator, married Gaius Marius.
- Sextus Julius C. f. (C. n.) Caesar, consul in 91 BC, uncle of the dictator.
- Gaius Julius C. f. C. n. Caesar, consul in 59, 48, 46, 45, and 44 BC, dictator in 49, and from 47 to 44 BC.
- Julia C. f. C. n., eldest sister of the dictator, and wife of Lucius Pinarius and Quintus Pedius.
- Julia C. f. C. n., older sister of the dictator, and wife of Marcus Atius Balbus.
- Julia C. f. C. n., daughter of the dictator, and wife of Gnaeus Pompeius Magnus.
- Sextus Julius Sex. f. C. n. Caesar, Flamen Quirinalis in 57 BC.
- Sextus Julius Sex. f. Sex. n. Caesar, appointed governor of Syria in 47 BC, killed in a revolt of the soldiers.
- Gaius Julius C. f. C. n. Caesar Octavianus, adopted son of the dictator, afterwards the emperor Augustus.

==== Julio-Claudian dynasty ====
- Imperator Caesar divi f. C. n. Augustus (born Gaius Octavius), emperor from 27 BC to AD 14.
- Julia Augusti f. divi n. Augusta (born Livia), empress as the third wife of Augustus, and mother of the emperor Tiberius. Augustus adopted her into his family in his will.
- Tiberius Julius Augusti f. divi n. Caesar Augustus (born Tiberius Claudius Nero), son of Livia and adopted son of Augustus, emperor from AD 14 to 37.
- Julia Augusti. f. divi. n., daughter of Augustus by his second wife, Scribonia, married first Marcus Claudius Marcellus, second Marcus Vipsanius Agrippa, and lastly, the emperor Tiberius.
- Gaius Julius Augusti f. divi n. Caesar, the eldest son of Agrippa and Julia, adopted by Augustus.
- Lucius Julius Augusti f. divi n. Caesar, the second son of Agrippa and Julia, adopted by Augustus.
- Germanicus Julius Ti. f. Augusti. n. Caesar (born with an unknown name), nephew and adopted son of emperor Tiberius.
- Drusus Julius Ti. f. Augusti. n. Caesar (born Nero Claudius Drusus), son of the emperor Tiberius, was probably poisoned in AD 23 by Sejanus.
- Agrippa Julius Augusti f. divi n. Caesar, the third son of Agrippa and Julia, adopted by Augustus.
- Nero Julius Germanici. f. Ti. n. Caesar Germanicus, son of Germanicus, was exiled during the reign of Tiberius and died under unclear circumstances in AD 31.
- Drusus Julius Germanici. f. Ti. n. Caesar Germanicus, son of Germanicus, was likewise exiled by Tiberius, and is said to have starved to death in AD 33.
- [?] Julius Germanici. f. Ti. n. Caesar Germanicus, son of Germanicus whose first name is unknown, died in infancy.
- Tiberius Julius Germanici. f. Ti. n. Caesar Germanicus, son of Germanicus, died in childhood.
- Gaius Julius Germanici. f. Ti. n. Caesar Germanicus Major, son of Germanicus, died in early childhood.
- Gaius Julius Germanici. f. Ti. n. Caesar Germanicus Minor, son of Germanicus, better known as Caligula, emperor from AD 37 to 41.
- Julia Drusi. f. Ti. n. Livia, daughter of Drusus
- Tiberius Julius Drusi. f. Ti. n. Caesar Nero Gemellus, son of Drusus, was killed by the emperor Caligula.
- Germanicus Julius Drusi. f. Ti. n. Claudius Caesar Gemellus, son of Drusus, died in early childhood.
- Julia Germanici. f. Ti. n. Agrippina, daughter of Germanicus, and mother of the emperor Nero.
- Julia Germanici. f. Ti. n. Drusilla, daughter of Germanicus, married first Lucius Cassius Longinus, and second Marcus Aemilius Lepidus.
- Julia Germanici. f. Ti. n. Livilla, daughter of Germanicus, married Marcus Vinicius, consul in AD 30.
- Julia C. f. Germanici. n. Drusilla, daughter of Caligula, was murdered by the Praetorian Guard in AD 41.

=== Others ===
==== First century BC ====
- Lucius Julius Bursio, triumvir monetalis in 85 BC.
- Julius Polyaenus, a contemporary of Caesar, and the author of four epigrams in the Anthologia Graeca.
- Julia, possibly the name of a lady who wanted to divorce her husband Otho to marry Cicero's nephew Quintus. The name might be an error for Tutia.
- Lucius Julius Calidus, a poet in the final years of the Republic, proscribed by Volumnius, the partisan of Marcus Antonius, but saved through the intercession of Atticus.
- Gaius Julius Hyginus, a freedman of Augustus, appointed head of the Palatine library, and the author of numerous books about history, mythology, and science.
- Julius Modestus, a freedman of Gaius Julius Hyginus, who became a distinguished grammarian, and the author of Quaestiones Confusae.
- Julius Marathas, a freedman of Augustus, who wrote a life of his master.
- Marcus Julius Cottius, king of several Alpine tribes of the Ligures, submitted to Augustus and granted the title of Praefectus.
- Gaius Julius Eurycles, a wealthy Spartan who assisted Octavian at the battle of Actium and was subsequently awarded citizenship. He was the father of Laco and the grandfather of Spartiaticus.

==== First century ====
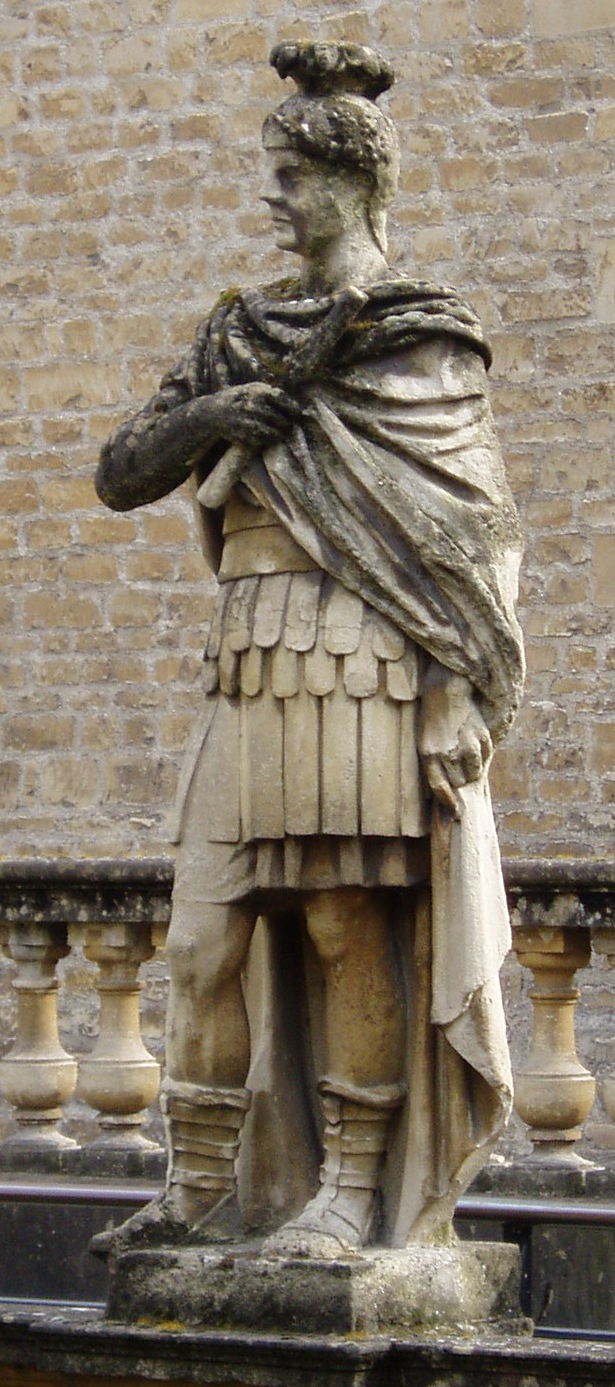
Gnaeus Julius Agricola, statue at Bath

- Julius Florus, an orator, jurist, poet, and either the author or editor of several satires during the reign of Augustus. He accompanied Tiberius to Armenia, and may have been the uncle of Julius Secundus, and perhaps the friend of Quintilian, who calls him an eminent orator of Gaul.
- Julius M. f. Vestalis, a son of Marcus Julius Cottius, was a centurion, and in AD 12 commanded the force that retook the frontier post of Aegyssus from the Getae, a deed celebrated by Ovid.
- Gaius Julius M. f. Donnus, son of Marcus Julius Cottius, prefect of the Ligures, fought for Tiberius.
- Marcus Julius M. f. Cottius, another son of Marcus Julius Cottius, prefect of the Ligures, was granted title of king by the emperor Claudius.
- Julius Florus, leader of an insurrection of the Treveri during the reign of Tiberius.
- Julius Sacrovir, a leader of the Aedui, who together with Julius Florus revolted in AD 21.
- Julius Secundus, an orator and friend of Quintilian, perhaps the nephew of the Gallic orator Julius Florus.
- Julius Montanus, a senator, poet, and friend of Tiberius, cited by both the elder and younger Seneca. After the emperor Nero assaulted him in the dark, Montanus resisted forcefully before recognizing his attacker and begging for mercy, but he was compelled to commit suicide.
- Sextus Julius Postumus, used by Sejanus in one of his schemes, AD 23.
- Julius Africanus, of the Gallic state of the Santones, was condemned by Tiberius in AD 32.
- Julius Celsus, a tribune of the city cohort, was condemned to death under Tiberius, but broke his own neck in prison, in order to avoid a public execution.
- Julius Canus, a Stoic philosopher, condemned to death by the emperor Caligula. He had promised to appear to his friends after his death, and fulfilled his promise by appearing to one of them in a vision.
- Julius Graecinus, a writer on botany, and the father of Gnaeus Julius Agricola, was put to death by Caligula.
- Gaius Julius Callistus, a freedman of Caligula, influential during his reign and that of Claudius.
- Gaius Julius Sex. f. Postumus, governor of Egypt from AD 45 to 48.
- Marcus Julius Romulus, adlected into the Senate after serving as tribune of the plebs, also served as legate of the Legio XV Apollinaris, and proconsul of Macedonia.
- Gaius Julius Aquila, an eques, sent to protect Cotys, King of the Bosporus, in AD 50.
- Tiberius Julius Alexander, an equestrian from a wealthy Jewish family from Alexandria, procurator of Judea from AD 46 to AD 48 and governor of Egypt from AD 66 to AD 69. He was present as part of Titus's entourage during the siege of Jerusalem.
- Marcus Julius Alexander, younger brother of Tiberius Julius Alexander, he was betrothed to the princess Berenice but died prematurely in AD 44 and had no issue with her.
- Julius Pelignus, Procurator of Cappadocia in AD 52, during the reign of Claudius.
- Julius Bassus, said by the elder Plinius to have written a medical work in Greek.
- Gaius Julius C. f. Laco, the son of Eurycles, was an augur and flamen of the imperial cult at Corinth. He was one of the municipal duumvirs, and served as agonothete of the Isthmian Games.
- Gaius Julius C. f. C. n. Spartiaticus, the son of Gaius Julius Laco, was a military tribune from Corinth. He held several of the same offices as his father, being a priest of the imperial cult, duumvir, and agonothete of the Isthmian Games, according to an inscription dating between the reign of Nero and the end of the first century.
- Julius Densus, an eques during the reign of Nero, accused of being too favorably disposed towards Britannicus in AD 56.
- Julius Diocles of Carystus, author of four epigrams in the Greek Anthology.
- Gaius Julius Alpinus Classicianus, procurator of Britannia from AD 61 to 65.
- Julia Pacata, the wife of Classicanus.
- Julius Indus, a cavalry commander of the Treveri, and the father-in-law of Classicanus.
- Julius Africanus, a celebrated orator in the reign of Nero.
- Lucius Julius Rufus, consul in AD 67. His death is related by the elder Pliny.
- Gaius Julius Vindex, one of the chief supporters of Galba, led the rebellion against Nero.
- Julius Fronto, a supporter of Otho, put in chains by the soldiers because his brother, Julius Gratus, was a supporter of Vitellius.
- Julius Gratus, prefect of the camp in the army of Aulus Caecina Alienus, the general of Vitellius, was put in chains by the soldiers because his brother, Julius Fronto, supported Otho.
- Julius Carus, one of the murderers of Titus Vinius when the emperor Galba was put to death in AD 69.
- Gaius Julius Civilis, leader of the Batavian Rebellion in AD 69.
- Julius Classicus, of the Treveri, who with Civilis was one of the leaders of the Batavian Rebellion.
- Julius Paulus, the brother of Civilis, was put to death on a false charge of treason by Gaius Fonteius Capito, the governor of Germania Inferior.
- Julius Briganticus, a nephew of Civilis, who fought under Cerealis in Germania, and fell in battle in AD 71.
- Julius Sabinus, of the Lingones, joined in the revolt of the Batavi.
- Julius Tutor, of the Treviri, joined in the rebellion of Classicus.
- Julius Calenus, of the Aedui, a partisan of Vitellius, was sent to Gaul as proof of the emperor's defeat at Cremona in AD 69.
- Julius Priscus, appointed Praetorian Prefect by Vitellius in AD 69, he failed to hold the passes of the Apennines, and returned to Rome in disgrace.
- Julius Placidus, tribune of a cohort in the army of Vespasian, who dragged Vitellius from his hiding place.
- Julius Burdo, commander of the Roman fleet in Germania, in AD 70. Previously suspected by the soldiers of having a hand in the death of Gaius Fonteius Capito, he was protected by Vitellius.
- Sextus Julius Gabinianus, a celebrated rhetorician who taught in Gaul during the time of Vespasian, and was spoken of by Suetonius in De Claris Rhetoribus.
- Julia Procilla, the mother of Agricola.
- Gnaeus Julius Agricola, consul in AD 77, the conqueror of Britannia.
- Julius Cerealis, a poet, and a friend and contemporary of the younger Pliny and Martial.
- Tiberius Julius Lupus, governor of Roman Egypt from 71 to 73.
- Lucius Julius Marinus, governor of Bithynia and Pontus at some point between AD 85 and 89.
- Julius Rufus, a writer of satires, contemporary with Martial.
- Sextus Julius Frontinus, twice consul in the late first century, and author of De Aquaeductu.
- Gaius Junius Silanus, (Note: Normally the surname Silanus is associated with the Junia gens; but the combination Julius Silanus is attested by the Fasti Ostienses and multiple other inscriptions of the period.) consul suffectus in AD 92.
- Julius Naso, a friend of both the younger Pliny and Tacitus, who were interested in his success as a candidate for public office.
- Julius Calvaster, a military tribune who took part in the rebellion of Lucius Antonius Saturninus, but was pardoned by Domitian.
- Julius Ferox, consul suffectus from the Kalends of November in AD 100, and subsequently Curator of the Banks and Courses of the Tiber, and of the Cloaca Maxima. He is sometimes confused with the jurist Urseius Ferox.

==== Second century ====
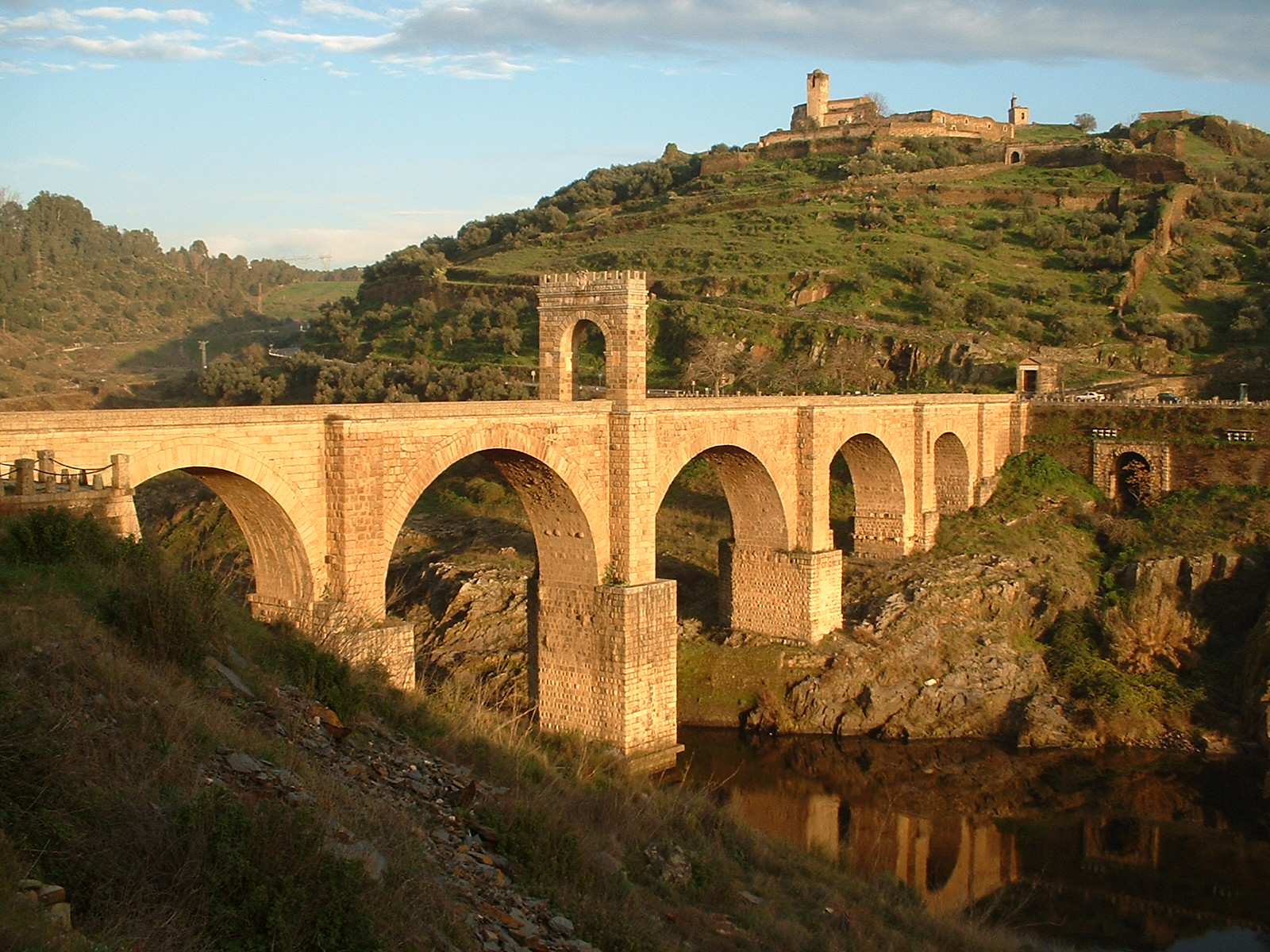
Trajan's Bridge at Alcántara, built by C. Julius Lacer

- Lucius Julius Ursus, consul in AD 84, 98, and 100.
- Gaius Julius Servilius Ursus Servianus, the brother-in-law of Hadrian, and consul in AD 107, 111, and 136.
- Gaius Julius Lacer, an architect during the reign of Trajan. His name is inscribed upon the famous bridge over the Tagus, which he built, and which still stands.
- Gaius Julius Africanus, grandson of the orator Julius Africanus, was consul suffectus in AD 108.
- Gaius Julius Antiochus Epiphanes Philopappus, a prince of Commagene, consul suffectus in AD 109.
- Sextus Julius Major, a wealthy noble from Asia, consul suffectus circa AD 126.
- Julius Severianus, a rhetorician in the time of Hadrian, and the author of Syntomata, or Praecepta Artis Rhetoricae.
- Sextus Julius Severus, governor of Britannia and Bithynia under Hadrian, was sent to Judaea to suppress the Bar Kokhba revolt.
- Julius Aquila, a jurist, probably of the late second century.
- Lucius Julius Aquila, the author of De Etrusca Disciplina, a work on Etruscan religion.
- Julius Vestinus, a sophist, who made an abridgement of the lexicon of Pamphilus.
- Julius Pollux, a Greek sophist and grammarian, and a teacher of grammar and rhetoric at Athens during the reign of Commodus.
- Julius Titianus, a scholar and writer of the late second century, and the father of the rhetorician Titianus.
- Julius Titianus, a rhetorician, and tutor of the younger Maximinus.
- Julius Solon, purchased the rank of senator under Commodus, but put to death by Septimius Severus, at the commencement of his reign.
- Julius Crispus, a distinguished tribune of the Praetorian Guard, capriciously put to death by Septimius Severus during the Parthian War in AD 199.
- Julius Rufus, a nobilis, slain by Septimius Severus.
- Lucius Julius Julianus, legate of the Legio II Augusta.

==== Third century ====
- Julius Frontinus, a Latin rhetorician, who gave instruction in his art to Severus Alexander.
- Julius Granianus, a rhetorician at the time of Severus Alexander, who was instructed by him in rhetoric.
- Julius Paulus, a distinguished jurist and prolific writer on the law, during the early third century.
- Julius Martialis, joined the conspiracy against the emperor Caracalla, whom he killed with his own hand, before being slain by the emperor's Scythian guards.
- Sextus Julius Africanus, a chronographer and Christian writer of the early third century.
- Gaius Julius Solinus, a grammarian and geographer, probably of the early third century.
- Julia Aquilia Severa, a Vestal Virgin, scandalously taken as a wife by the emperor Elagabalus.
- Gaius Julius Maximinus, equestrian governor of Mauretania Tingitana, between AD 222 and 235.
- Gaius Julius Verus Maximinus, surnamed Thrax, emperor from AD 235 to 238.
- Marcus Julius Philippus, also known as Philip the Arab, emperor from AD 244 to 249.
- Marcus Julius M. f. Philippus, emperor with his father from AD 247 to 249.
- Gaius Julius Saturninus, a name assigned to the younger Marcus Julius Philippus by Aurelius Victor.
- Quintus Julius Gallienus, a son of the emperor Gallienus, who probably predeceased his father.
- Julius Aterianus, said to have written a history of Victorinus, and perhaps others of the Thirty Tyrants.
- Julius Saturninus, usurper against the emperor Probus in AD 280.

==== Fourth century ====
- Julius Capitolinus, the supposed author of nine biographies in the Historia Augusta.
- Flavius Julius Crispus, son of the emperor Constantine I; a distinguished soldier, he was put to death in AD 326.
- Julius Firmicus Maternus, a fourth-century astrologer and writer on the subject of profane religions.
- Julius Valerius Alexander Polemius, a historian who translated a Greek life of Alexander the Great; he is likely the same Polemius who was consul in AD 338.
- Julius Obsequens, perhaps of the fourth century, an author of a tract known as De Prodigiis, or Prodigiorum Libellus, describing various prodigies and phenomena found in the works of earlier writers.
- Gaius Julius Victor, a rhetorician of the fourth century.
- Julius Ausonius, an eminent physician, and praefectus of Illyricum under the emperor Valentinian I.
- (Julius) Ausonius, also called Decimus Magnus Ausonius, son of the physician, a celebrated poet.
- Julia Dryadia, daughter of the physician Julius Ausonius.
- Julius Rufinianus, a Latin rhetorician of uncertain date, and the author of a treatise called De Figuris Sententiarum et Elocutionis.
- Julius Paris, author of an epitome of Valerius Maximus, written perhaps in the fourth or fifth century.

==== Fifth century and after ====
- Julius Valerius Majorianus, emperor from AD 457 to 461.
- Julius Nepos, emperor from AD 474 to 475.
- Julius Exsuperantius, a late Roman historian, probably of the fifth or sixth century; his tract, De Marii, Lepidi, ac Sertorii Bellis Civilibus may have been abridged from the histories of Sallust.
- Claudius Julius or Joläus, a Greek historian of unknown date, wrote works on Phoenicia and the Peloponnesus.
- Julius Celsus, a scholar at Constantinople in the seventh century, who made a recension of the text of Caesar's commentaries.

== See also ==
- List of Roman gentes
