= Lucius Julius Libo =

Roman senator and general

Lucius Julius Libo (fl. 267–266 BC) was a Roman senator and military commander. He was consul in 267 BC, together with Marcus Atilius Regulus. During their term of office, the two men carried on a successful war against the Sallentini, a Messapian people of Apulia, and also conquered the city of Brundisium. In recognition of their victory, Libo and Regulus were granted a triumph, which they celebrated on 23 January 266.

Although the patrician Julii had been a prominent family of the early Roman Republic, Libo is the only member of the clan to appear in history since the dictatorship of Gaius Julius in 352 BC. For modern scholars, Libo probably represents a genealogical link between the Julii of the early Republic and the Julii Caesares, who flourished from the time of the Second Punic War to early Imperial times. Sumner suggested that Libo, whose father and grandfather were both also named Lucius, was a descendant of Lucius Julius Iullus, consular tribune in 388 and 379 BC, while Badian also adduced other known relatives of Iullus as possibilities. It has also been conjectured that Lucius Julius, father of Sextus Julius Caesar, praetor in 208 BC, was the son of Libo.

== Bibliography ==
- Smith, William, ed. (1849). "Libo, L. Julius". Dictionary of Greek and Roman Biography and Mythology. Boston: Little, Brown and Co. p. 778.
- Badian, Ernst (2009). "From the Iulii to Caesar". In Miriam Griffin (ed.). A Companion to Julius Caesar. Wiley-Blackwell. pp. 11–22. ISBN 978-1-405-14923-5.
- Sumner, G.V. (1971). "The Lex Annalis under Caesar". Phoenix. 25 (3): 246–271. doi:10.2307/1087361. JSTOR 1087361.

Preceded by Publius Sempronius Sophus; Appius Claudius Russus	Roman consul 267 BC; With: Marcus Atilius Regulus	Succeeded by Decimus Junius Pera; Numerius Fabius Pictor
