= Bovillae =

Ancient Roman town

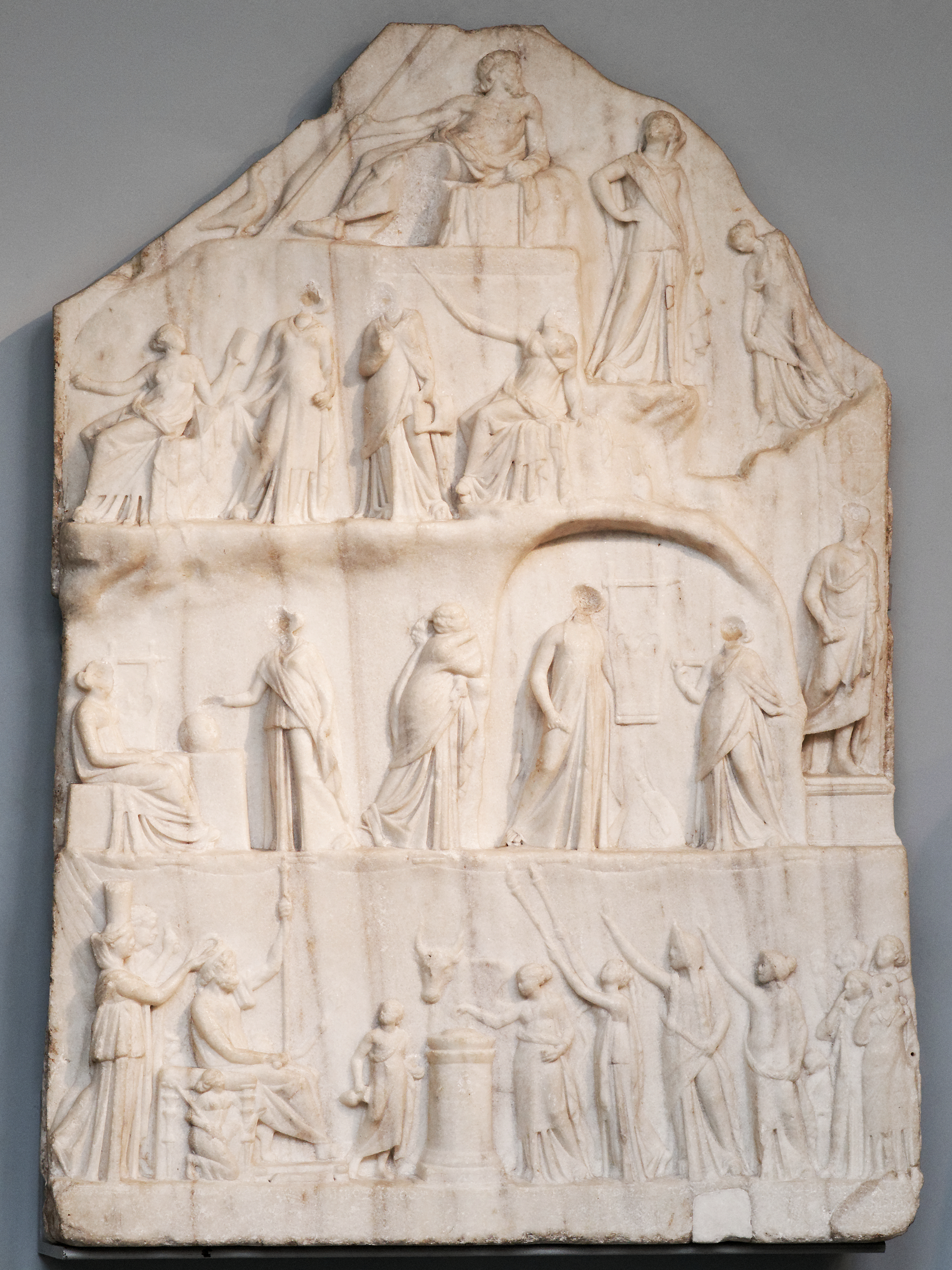
Apotheosis of Homer by Archelaus of Priene. Originally on the Via Appia in Bovillae, now in the British Museum.

Bovillae was an ancient Latin town in Lazio, central Italy, currently part of Frattocchie frazione in the municipality of Marino.

== Overview ==
Bovillae was a station on the Via Appia (which in 293 BC was already paved up to this point), located c. 11 miles (18 km) south-east of Rome. It was a colony of Alba Longa, and appears as one of the thirty cities of the Latin League. After the destruction of Alba Longa in 658 BC the sacra were, it was held, transferred to Bovillae, including the cult of Vesta (in inscriptions virgines Vestales Albanae are mentioned, and the inhabitants of Bovillae are always spoken of as Albani Longani Bovillenses) and that of the gens Iulia. The existence of this hereditary worship led to an increase in its importance when the Julian house rose to the highest power in the state. The horsemen met Augustus's dead body at Bovillae on its way to Rome, and in 16 AD the shrine of the family worship was dedicated anew and yearly games in the circus instituted, probably under the charge of the sodales Augustales, whose official calendar has been found here.

Bovillae appears as the scene of the quarrel between Milo and Clodius, in which the latter, whose villa lay above the town on the left of the Via Appia, was killed. The site is not naturally strong, and remains of early fortifications cannot be traced. It may be that Bovillae took the place of Alba Longa as a local centre after the destruction of the latter by Rome, which would explain the deliberate choice of a strategically weak position.

Remains of the circus built there by Tiberius in 14 AD in honor of Augustus can still be seen at 41°45′27″N 12°37′18″E (use satellite image sites e.g., Wikimapia), and of an octagonal mausoleum, on the edge of the Via Appia. There were once also a theatre and a schola actorum ("actor's school"), identified by an inscription found in the neighbourhood, and, probably, a temple dedicated to Veiovis, a divinity associated to the gens Iulia.

Remains of a side-road leading off from the nearby Appian Way were unearthed during excavation work to build a McDonald's restaurant in 2014. During the excavation, a total of four male skeletons were also discovered. The restaurant itself now houses a view of a 150-foot stretch of 2,000-year-old cobbled street beneath a glass walkway. It's also possible to go into the excavated area from a separate entrance.
