= The Apotheosis of Homer (disambiguation) =

The Apotheosis of Homer is a common classical and neo-classical art scene showing the poet apotheosis of Homer.

The Apotheosis of Homer may also refer to:

- The Apotheosis of Homer (Dalí), a 1944–1945 painting by Salvador Dalí
- The Apotheosis of Homer (Ingres), 1827 painting by Jean Auguste Dominique Ingres
