= Exuperantius =

Exuperantius is the name of:

- Exuperantius (martyr) (died 286), a servant of Saints Felix and Regula
- Exuperantius of Poitiers (fl. 417), the father of Palladius
- Exuperantius of Ravenna (died 477), bishop
- Exuperantius of Cingoli (fl. 496), a Catholic saint
- Julius Exsuperantius (5th/6th century), Roman historian

== See also ==
- Exuperantia
