= Figure painting =

Genre of painting that represents the human form

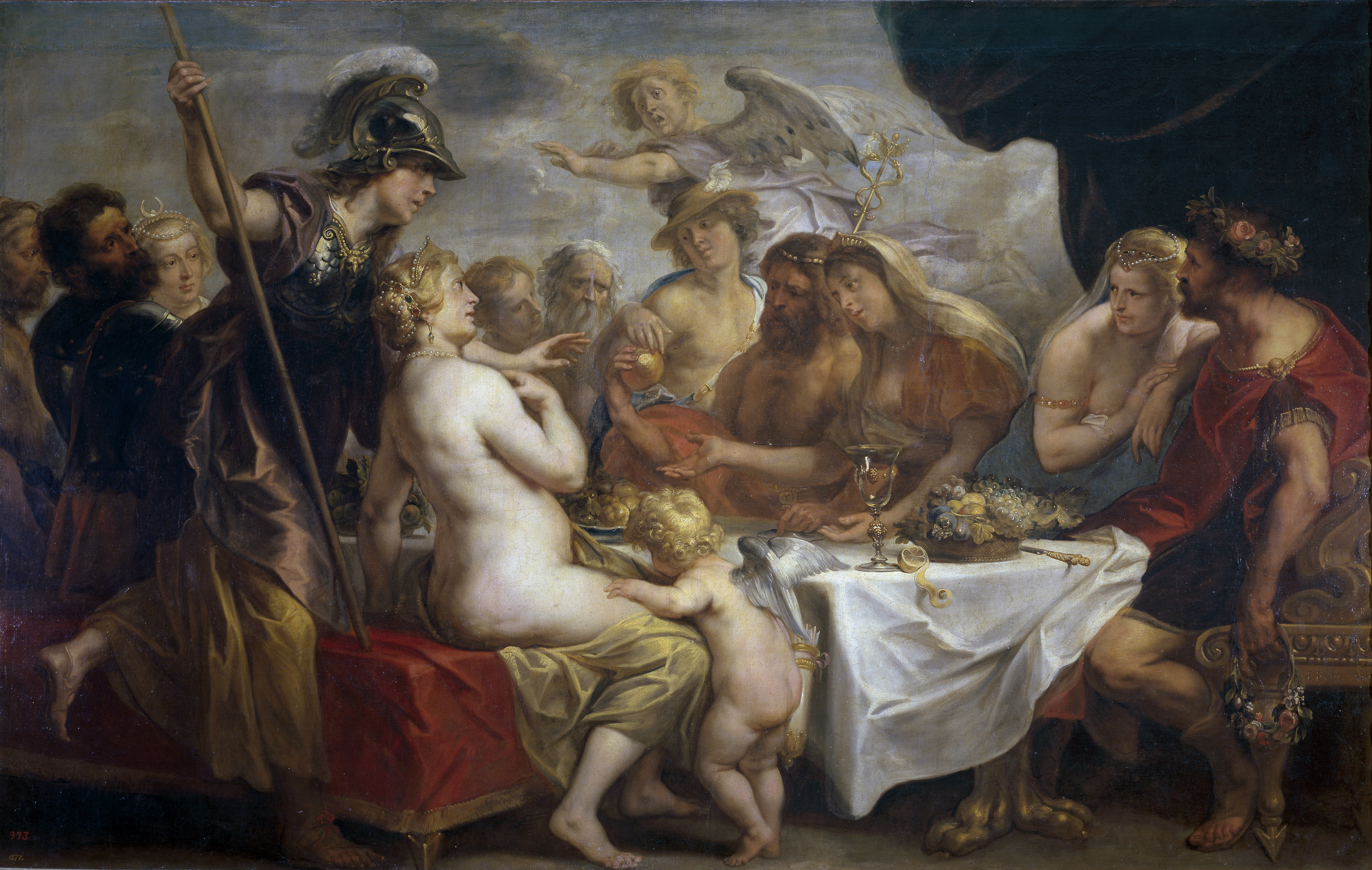
The Golden Apple of Discord at the wedding of Peleus and Thetis, Jacob Jordaens, 1633, 181 cm × 288 cm (71 in × 113 in), oil on canvas

A figure painting is a work of fine art in any of the painting media with the primary subject being the human figure, whether clothed or nude. Figure painting may also refer to the activity of creating such a work. The human figure has been a subject of art since the first Stone Age cave paintings and has been reinterpreted in various styles throughout history.

Unlike figure drawings, which are usually nudes, figure paintings are often clothed depictions, which may be either historically accurate or symbolic. Figure painting is not synonymous with figurative art, which may depict real objects of any kind.

== Clothed figures ==
=== Portraiture ===
A portrait painting focuses on the creation of a likeness to a particular individual or group.

=== Everyday life ===
Genre painting portrays ordinary people engaged in common activities.

=== Narrative paintings ===
Historical paintings depict events in a narrative, which may be allegorical.

== Nude figures ==
The nude has been a theme in Western art since classical antiquity. It was largely absent during the Middle Ages but became popular again in Renaissance art. While standing nude figures of both sexes are found in antiquity, in Western art, male nudes were more prevalent through the idealisation of the male form in society. The first female reclining nudes as a popular genre appeared during the Renaissance, most notably in a work by Giorgione. Oil paint historically has been the ideal medium for depicting the figure. By blending and layering paint, the surface can become more like skin. "Its slow drying time and various degrees of viscosity enable the artist to achieve rich and subtle blends of color and texture, which can suggest transformations from one human substance to another." Although working from live models is preferred, the length of time needed to complete a painting has led most modern painters to use photographs as references at least part of the time if not for the entire work.

== History and styles ==
Antiquity
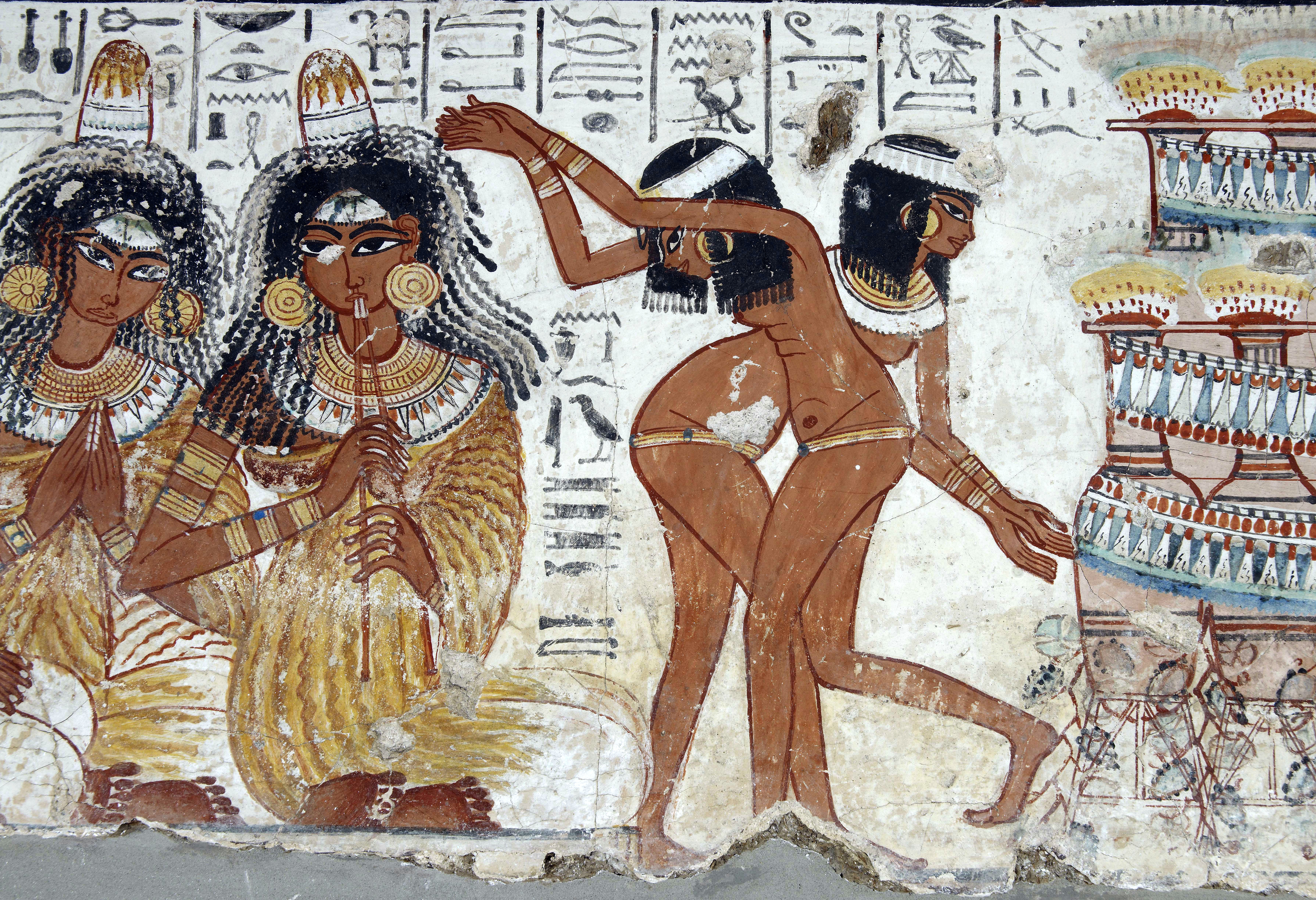
Thebes c. 1400 BCE

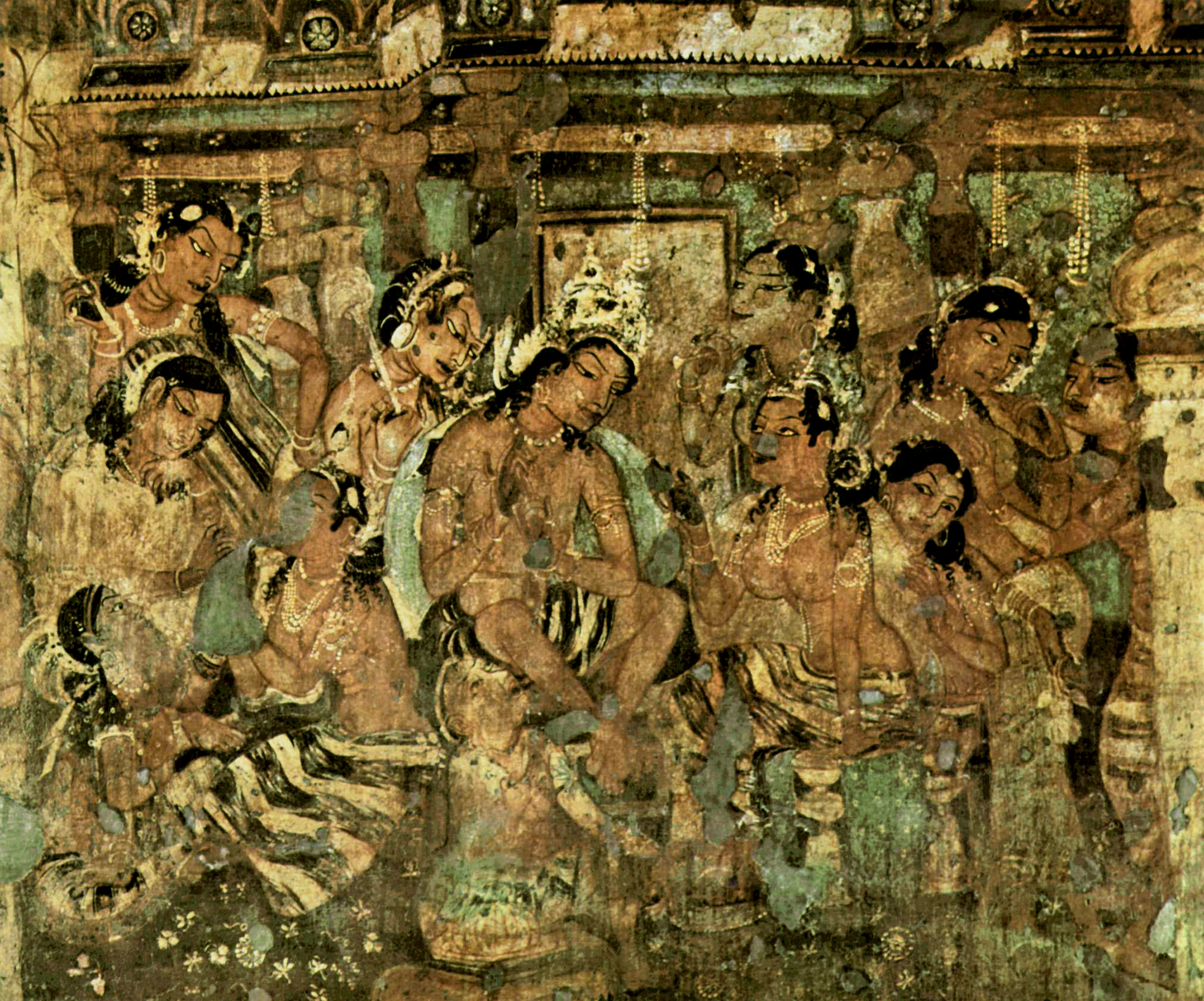
5th-century mural painting from the Ajanta Caves, India

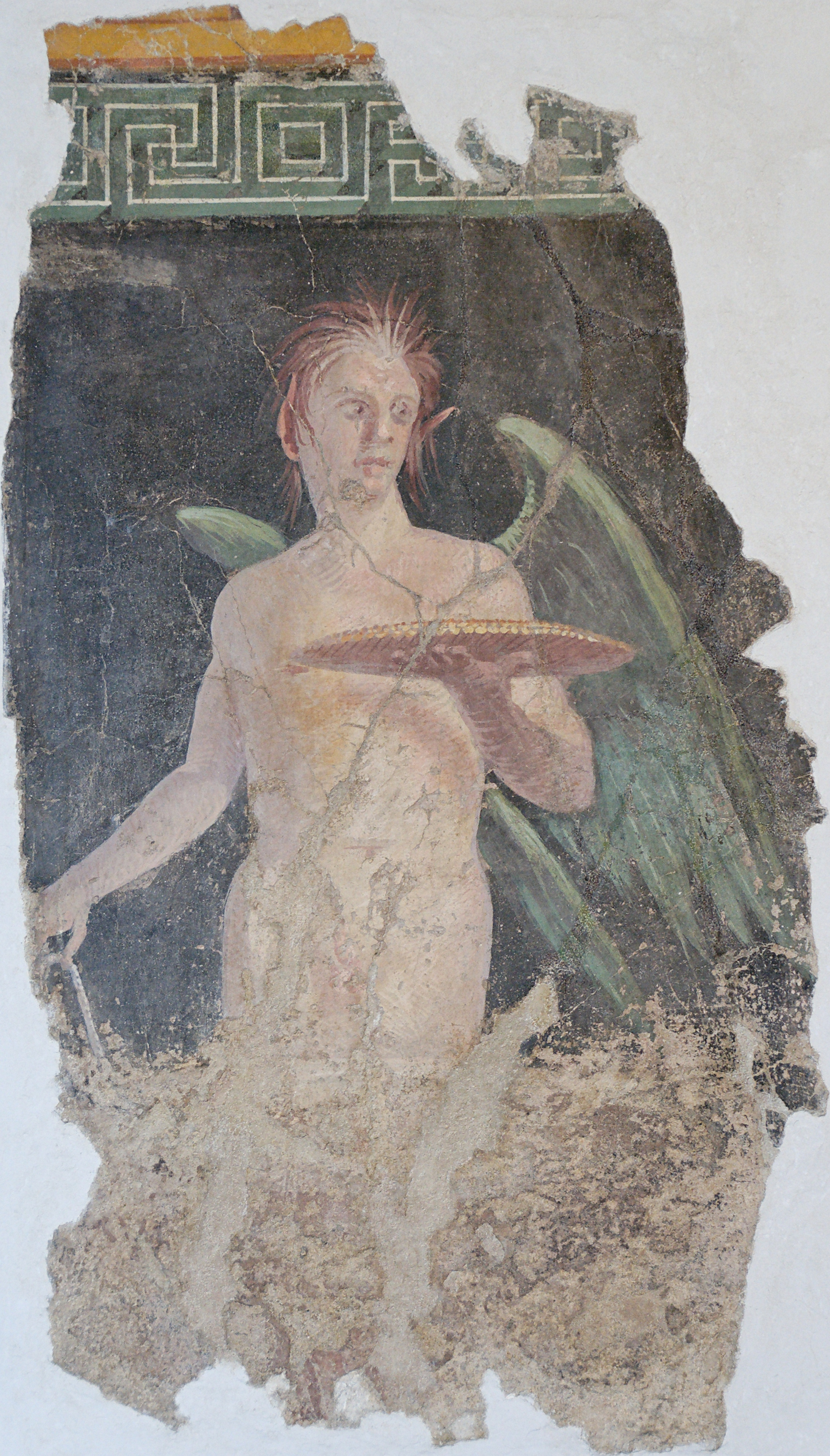
Winged genius, fragment. Second-style mural painting, Roman artwork, late 1st century BCE.
Mythological/Religious
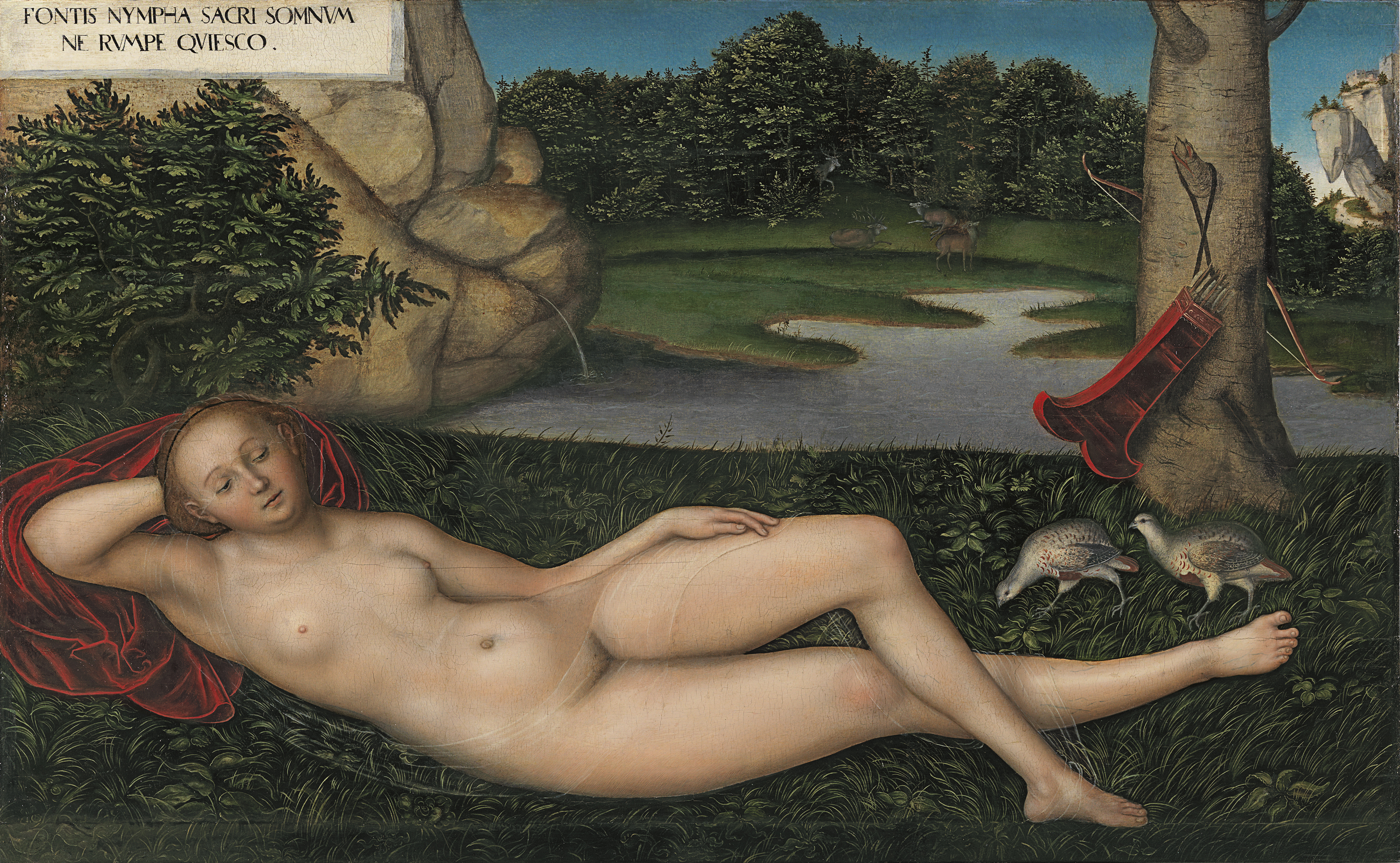
Reclining Nymph by Lucas Cranach the Elder

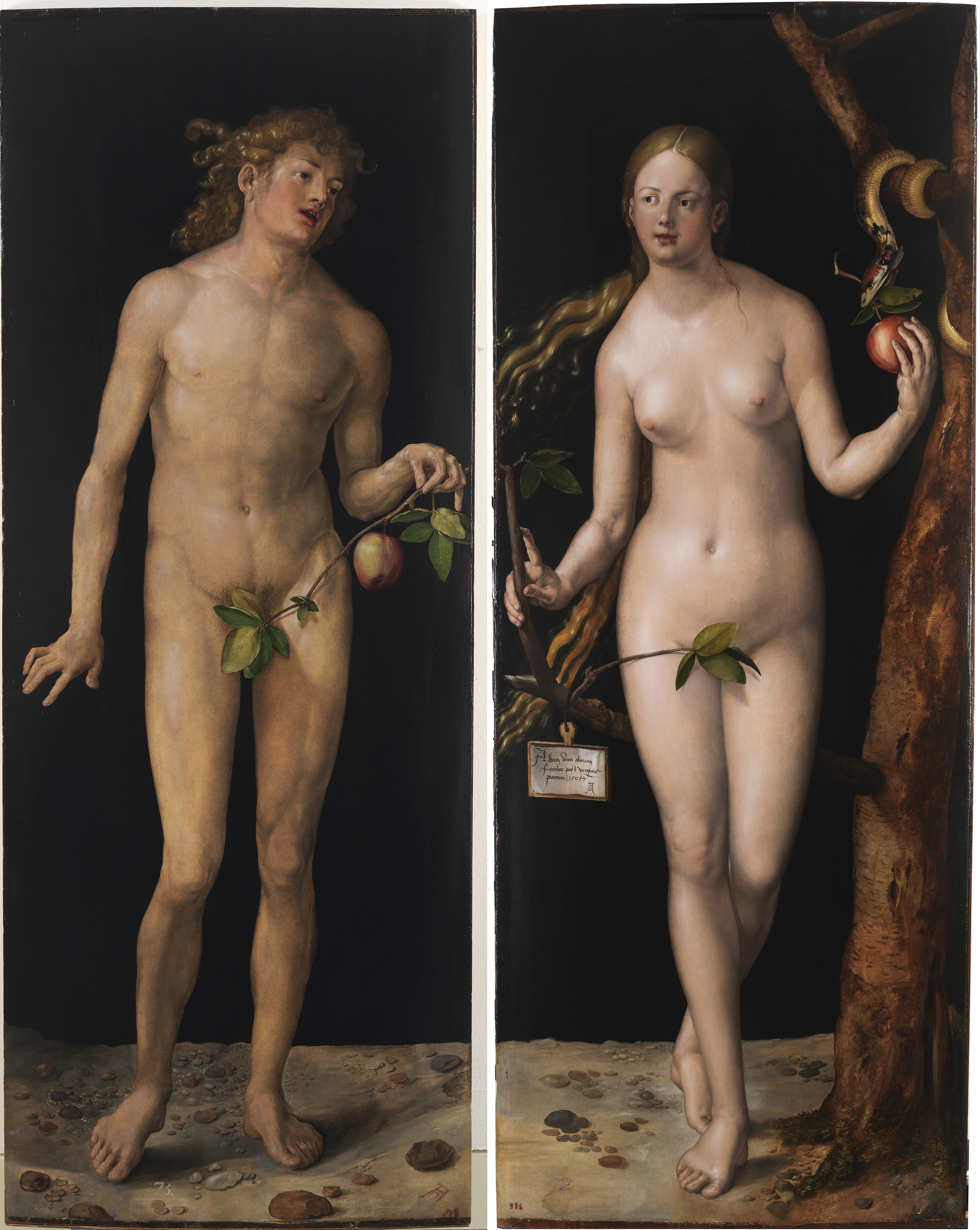
Adam and Eve (1507) by Albrecht Dürer

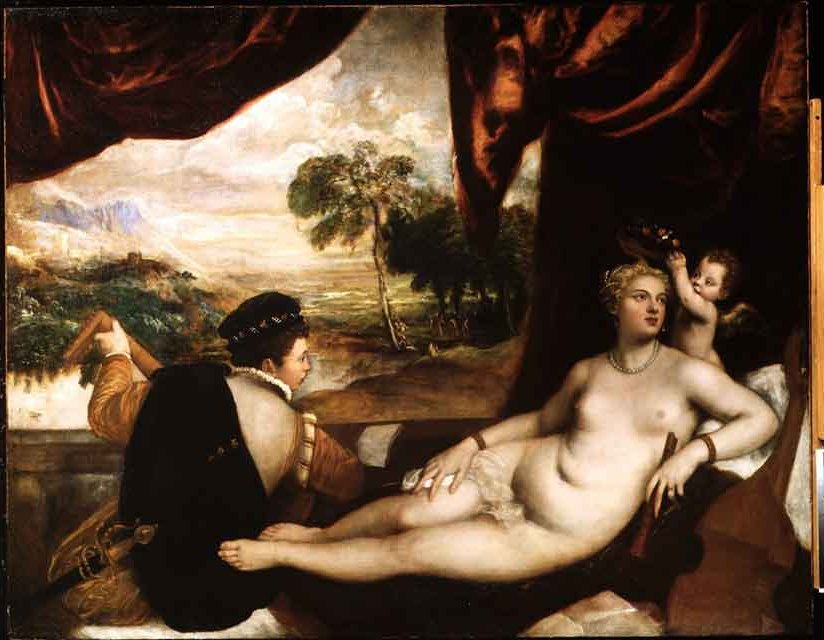
Venus and the Lute Player (1565–1570) by Titian

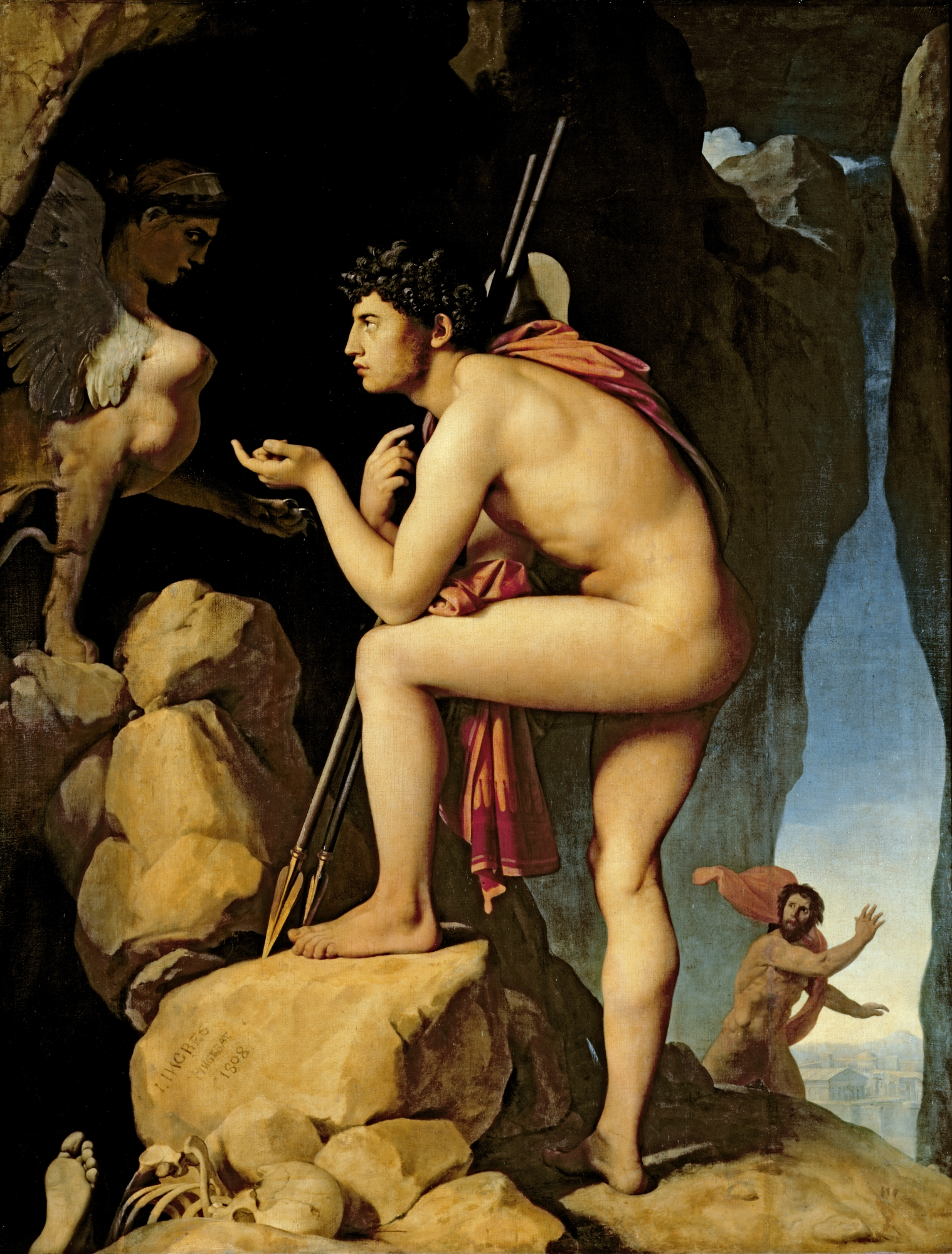
Oedipus and the Sphinx (1808) by Jean Auguste Dominique Ingres

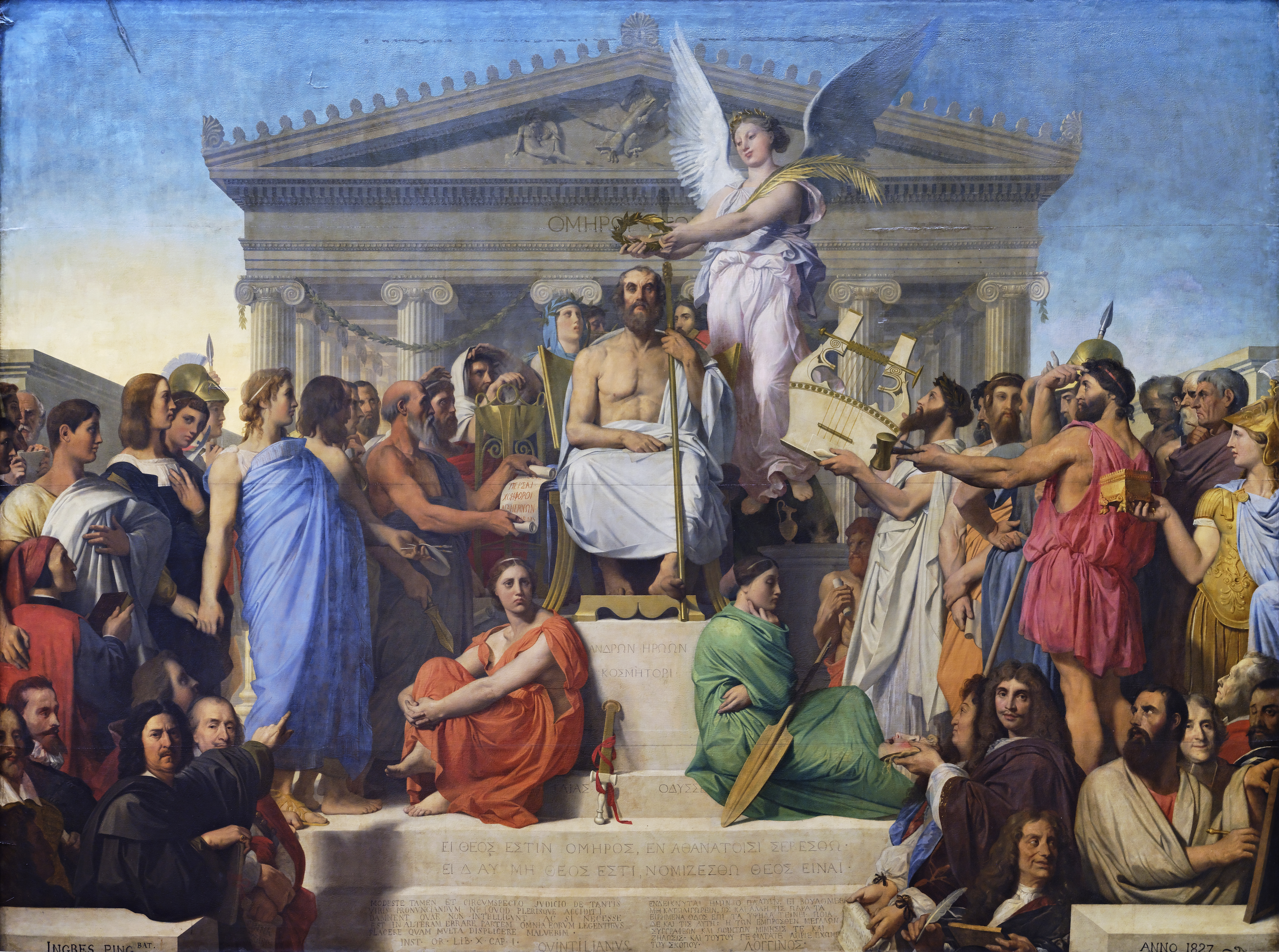
Apotheosis of Homer (1827) by Jean Auguste Dominique Ingres
Impressionist
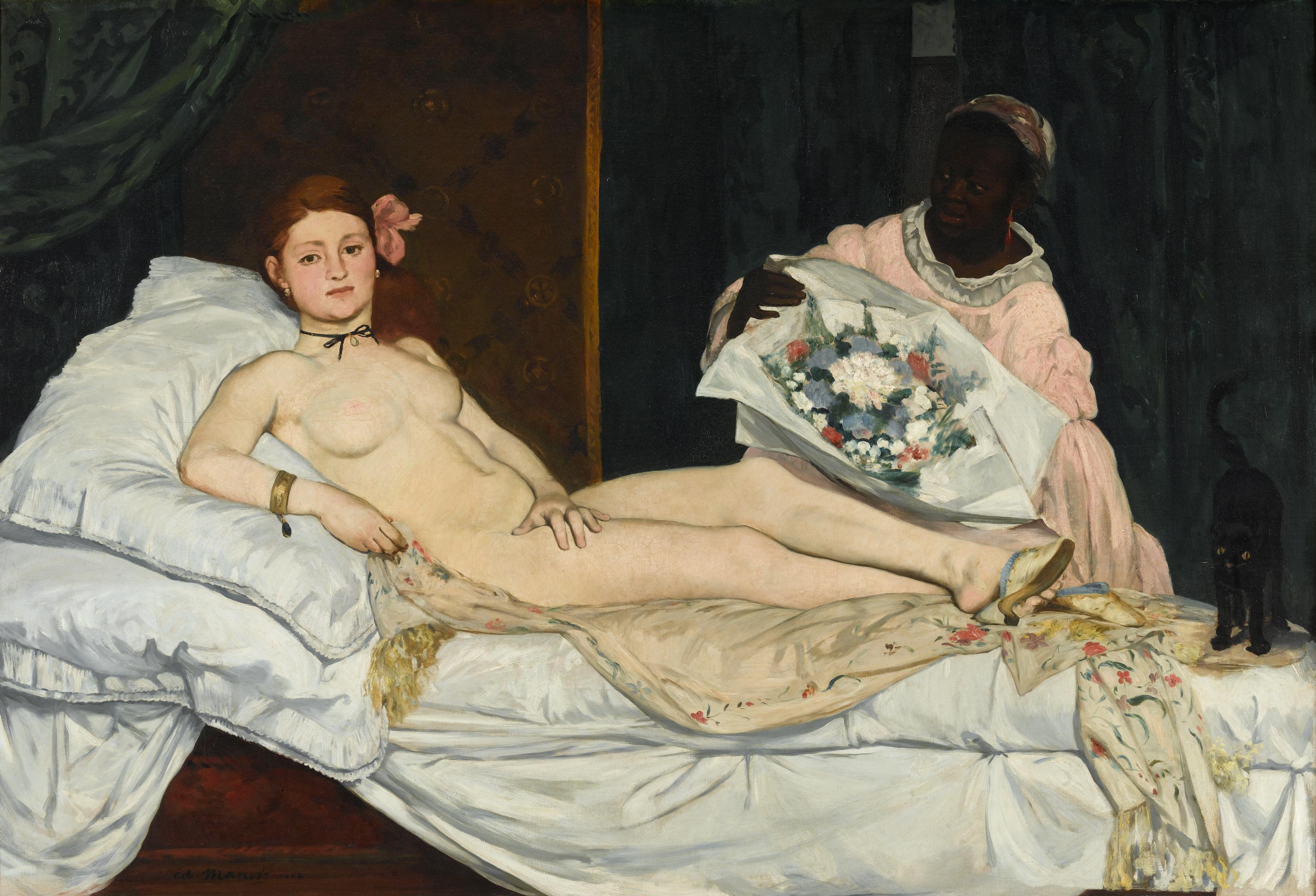
Olympia (1863) by Édouard Manet

Arrangement in Grey and Black No. 1 (The Artist's Mother) (1871) by James Abbott McNeill Whistler

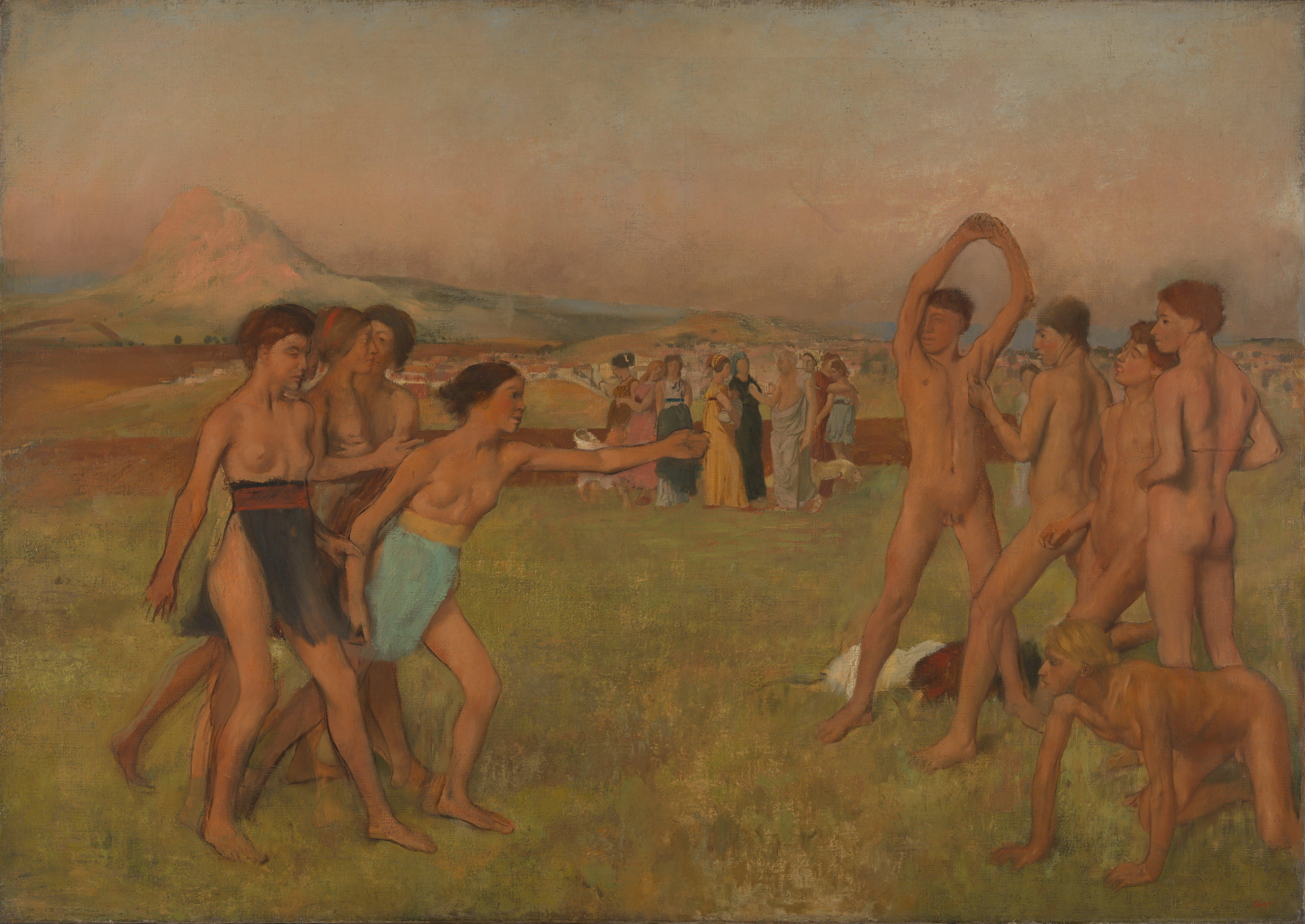
Young Spartans Exercising, c. 1860 by Edgar Degas
Academic
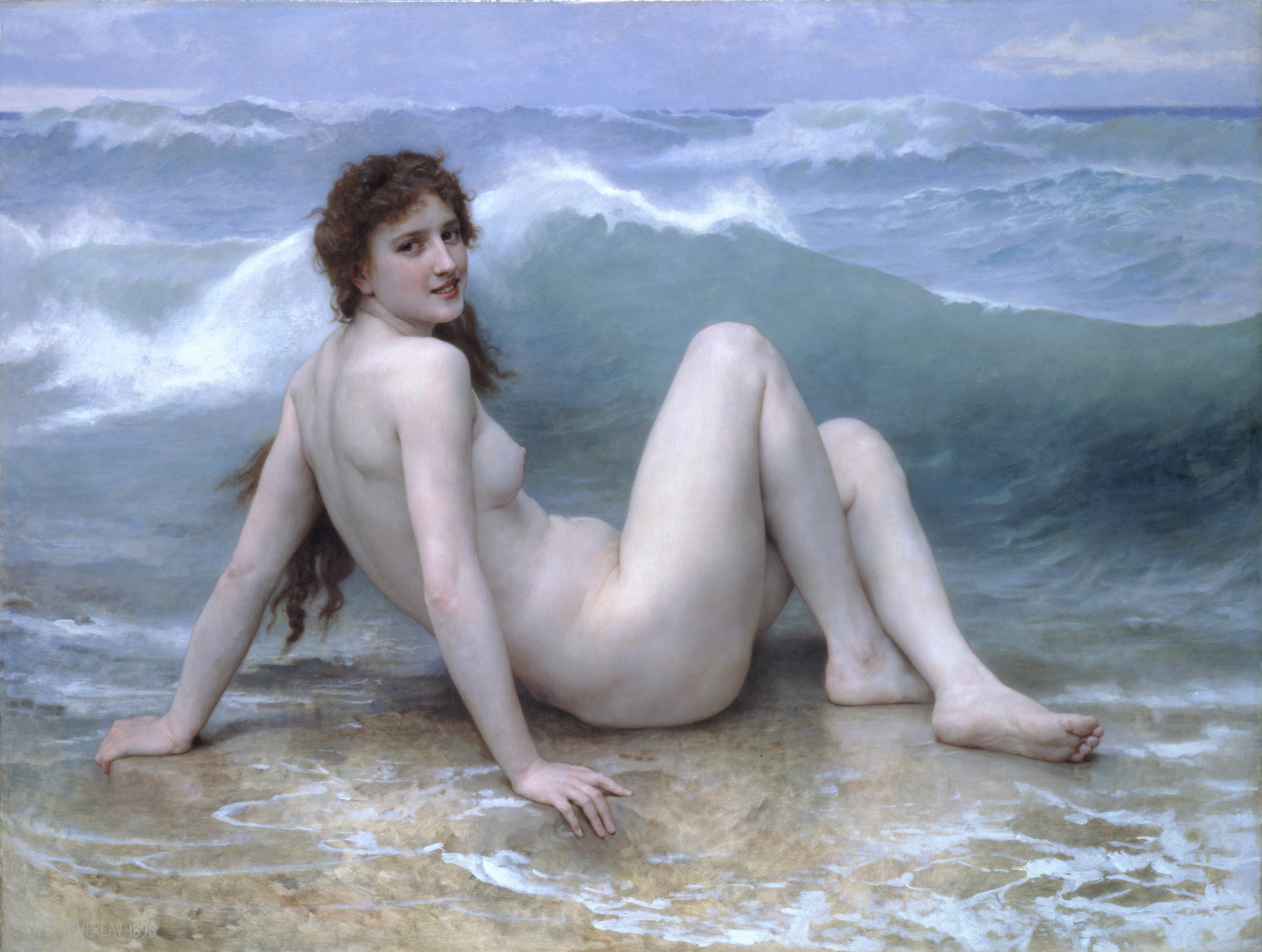
The Wave (1896) by William-Adolphe Bouguereau

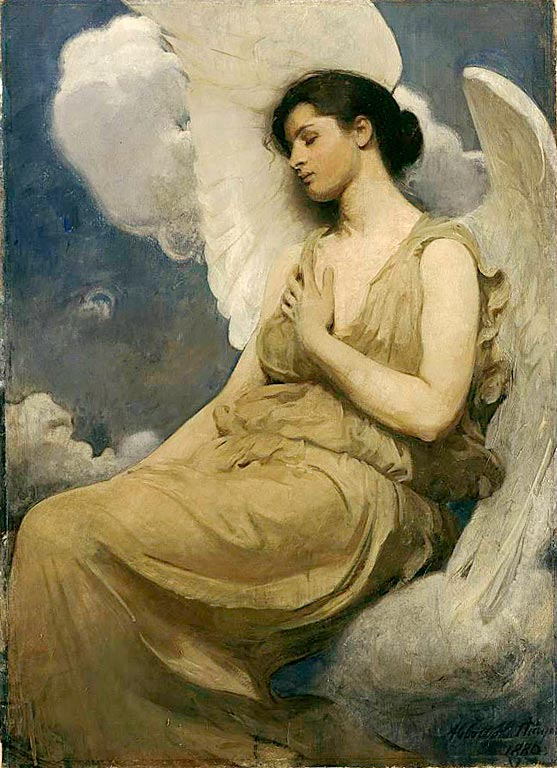
Winged Figure (1889) by Abbot Handerson Thayer

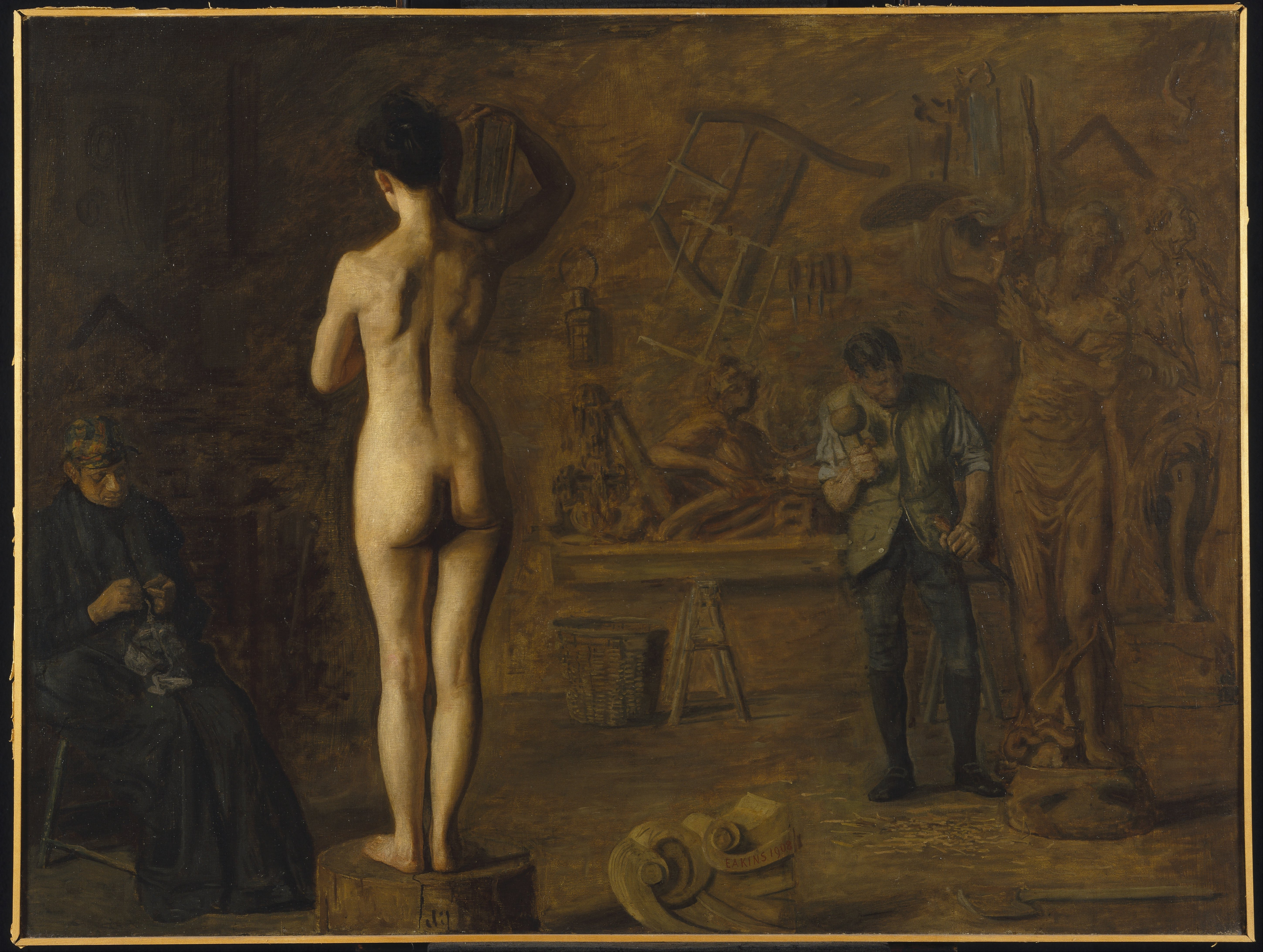
William Rush Carving His Allegorical Figure of the Schuylkill River (1908) by Thomas Eakins
Modern
Nude Descending a Staircase, No. 2 (1912) by Marcel Duchamp. Oil on canvas. Philadelphia Museum of Art.

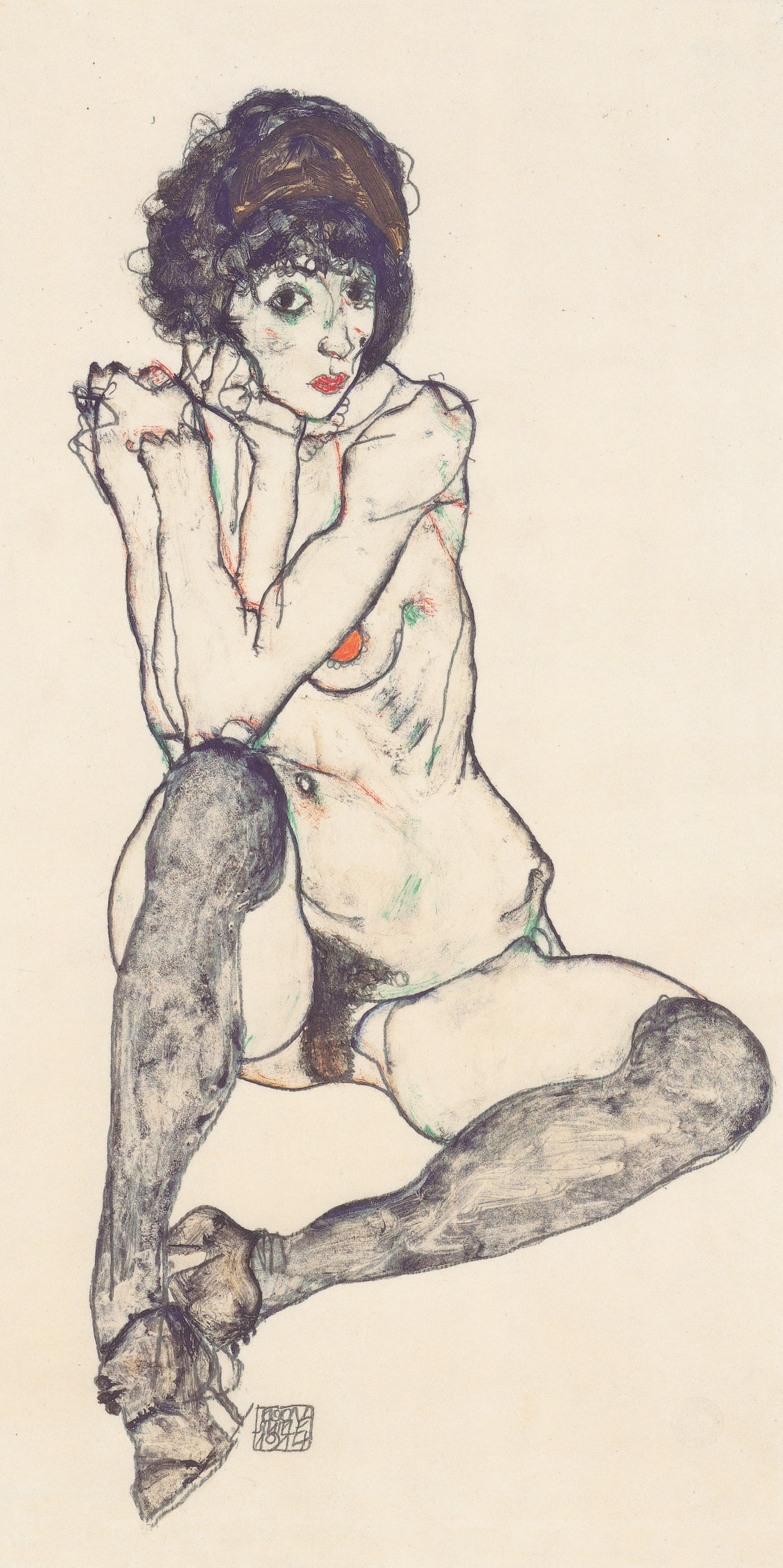
Sitzender weiblicher Akt mit aufgestützen Ellbogen (1914) by Egon Schiele

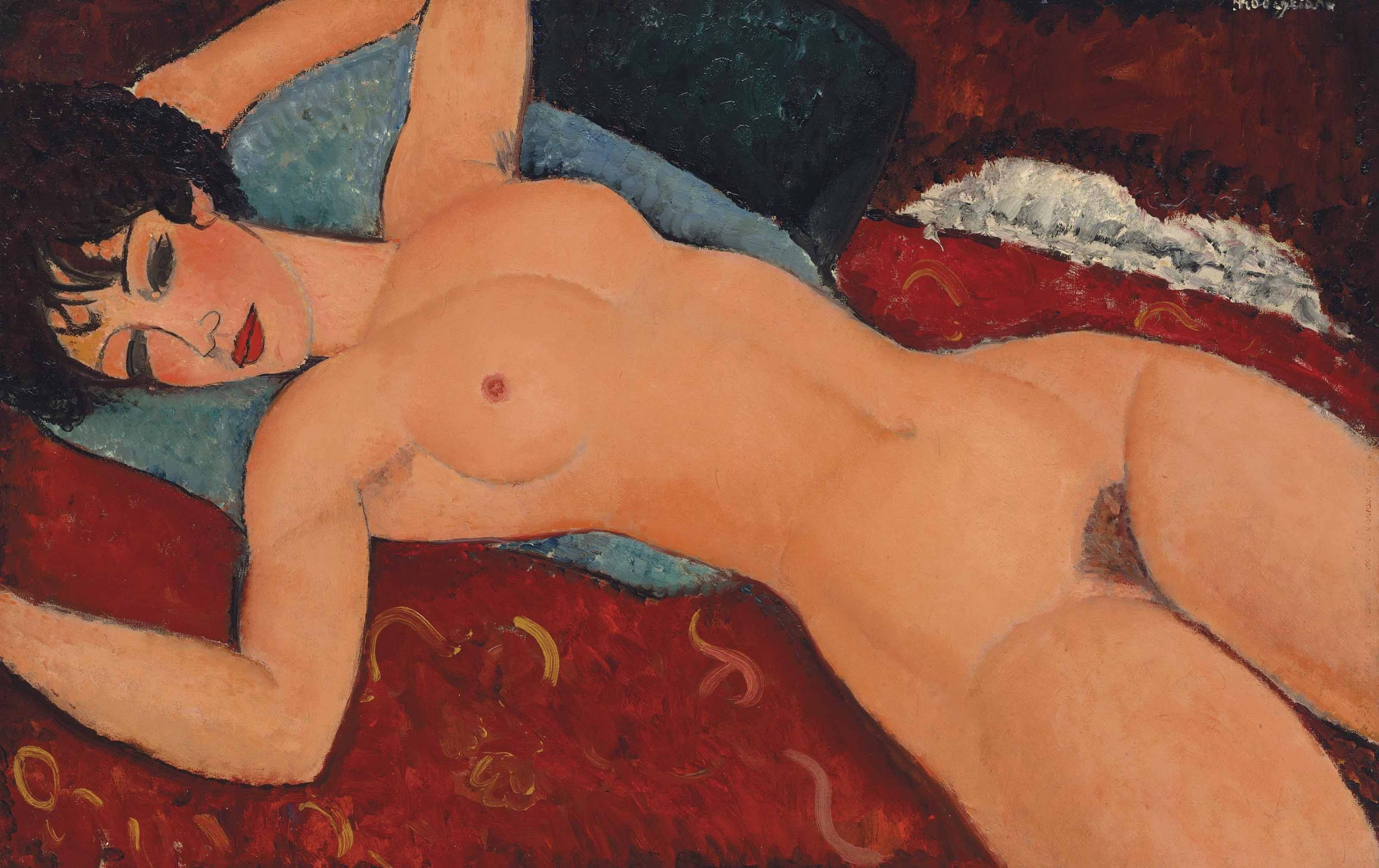
Red Nude (1917) by Amedeo Modigliani

== See also ==
- Depictions of nudity
