= Vopiscus =

Vopiscus may refer to:

- Vopiscus (praenomen), a Latin praenomen, or personal name
- Vopiscus Julius Iulus, a Roman consul in 473 BC
- Gaius Julius Caesar Strabo Vopiscus (c. 130 — 87 BC), an orator and tragedian
- Marcus Manilius Vopiscus, a Roman consul in AD 60
- Lucius Pompeius Vopiscus, a Roman consul in AD 69
- Publius Manilius Vopiscus Vicinillianus, a Roman consul in AD 114
- Flavius Vopiscus, one of the 4th century authors of the Historia Augusta
