= Julius Aquila =

Julius Aquila can refer to more than one figure of classical history:

- Gaius Julius Aquila, Roman knight of the mid 1st century, and also a Roman consul from the late 1st century
- Julius Gallus Aquila, Roman jurist, who probably lived in the 2nd century CE
