= Iuliu =

Iuliu is a Romanian male given name derived from Latin Iulius. The female form is Iulia. In other cases Iuliu is the Romanianized form of the Hungarian name Gyula.

People named Iuliu:

- Iuliu Barasch
- Iuliu Baratky
- Iuliu Bodola
- Iuliu Coroianu
- Iuliu Hațieganu
- Iuliu Ilyés
- Iuliu Maniu
- Iuliu Cezar Săvescu
- Iuliu Szöcs
- Iuliu Winkler

== See also ==
- Julius (given name)
