= Iulius Severianus =

Latin rhetor

Iulius Severianus was a Latin rhetor who lived in the 5th century AD. He belonged to the Julia gens. He wrote a book entitled Praecepta artis rhetoricae. One of the manuscripts (Cod. Bodmer 146, 10th century) was owned by Petrarch, who studied and commented on it with many glossa.
