= Tutia gens =

Ancient Roman family

The gens Tutia was an obscure plebeian family at ancient Rome. Only a few members of this gens are mentioned by Roman writers, but a number of others are known from inscriptions.

== Origin ==
The earliest known Tutii came from the ancient city of Praeneste in Latium. Their nomen is probably derived from the cognomen Tutus, meaning "safe", and belonging to a class of surnames originally derived from the supposed character of the bearer. A less likely source is the Oscan word touto, referring to a people, since the Praenestini were Latins, although Chase lists both Toutius and Tutius as gentilicia of apparently Oscan origin, based on touto.

== Praenomina ==
The Tutii used a variety of common praenomina, including Gaius, Lucius, Marcus, Publius, Quintus, Sextus, and Titus. From a filiation, we know that they also used the less-common Manius. Two of the early inscriptions of this gens provide examples of the feminine praenomina Maio and Mino, perhaps belonging to a pair of sisters at Praeneste.

== Members ==
This list includes abbreviated praenomina. For an explanation of this practice, see filiation.

- Maio Tutia Q. f., named in an inscription from Praeneste in Latium, dating between the middle of the third century BC, and the end of the second.
- Mino Tutia, named in a late third-century BC inscription from Praeneste.
- Tutia, the widow of Quintus Lepanius and mother of Gaius Lepanius Tidus, was granted a pension by the senate of Cora in Latium, at some point in the early or middle first century BC.
- Tutia, the wife of an Otho, whom she divorced with the intention of marrying the younger Quintus Tullius Cicero. (Note: The elder Quintus asked his brother, Marcus, what he knew of her reputation, confiding that he had attempted to discourage Tutia, but that she and his son were determined. Though finding the matter distasteful, Marcus reported that he had only heard about Tutia's looks, and unpleasant rumours about her father, which he claimed not to believe. Marcus supposed that his nephew's interest in Tutia was not serious, and he asked his friend, Atticus, who was acquainted with Tutia's in-laws, to inquire further. What Atticus discovered is unknown, but Marcus replied to him that his suspicions were confirmed.) It is unknown whether they were married before young Cicero, his father and uncle perished in the proscriptions of the Second Triumvirate. Some researcher have believed her name to be Julia.
- Tutia Ɔ. l. Licentia, a freedwoman named in a sepulchral inscription from Pompeii in Campania, dating from the first half of the first century.
- Gaius Tutius M'. f. Dansala, an eques in the Cohors IV Thracum, a regiment of cavalry auxilia. He was buried at Mogontiacum in Germania Superior, aged thirty-five, in a tomb dating from the reign of Tiberius, with a monument from Bitus, the son of Stacus.
- Tutius, a centurion in the seventh cohort of the praetorian guard at some point in the first or second century.
- Lucius Tutius Cerealis, supposedly consul in AD 106, is evidently a misreading for Vettulenus Cerealis, perhaps influenced by the appearance of Tutius Cerealis, (Note: Amended to Tuccius Cerealis, this would refer to one of the suffecti of 93.) a man of consular rank, in the letters of Pliny the Younger, although this presented its own difficulty, as the letter was written in AD 99.
- Tutia Marcia, the wife of Verecundus, a freedman of the emperor, who built a tomb for her at Praeneste, dating between the late first century and the end of the second.
- Gaius Tutius, dedicated a second-century tomb at Sulci in Sardinia for his father, whose name has not been preserved.
- Tutia P. f. Vitalis, buried in a late second-century tomb at Ausafa in Africa Proconsularis, aged sixty-seven.
- Marcus Tutius (Note: The reading of his nomen is uncertain; it begins Tut[...], and Tutius is only a likely interpretation.), one of the aediles, according to an inscription from Ostia in Latium, dating between AD 222 and 229.
- Tutia Eutychia, buried at Cirta in Numidia, along with Lucilla, aged forty, in a tomb dating from the middle part of the third century.

=== Undated Tutii ===
- Tutius, named in an inscription from Pompeii.
- Gaius Tutius, dedicated a cinerarium at the present site of Oued Fedhala, formerly part of Numidia, for Sextus Tutius Cornelianus.
- Titus Tutius T. f. Amabilis, built a family sepulchre at Placentia in Cisalpine Gaul for himself, his parents, Titus Tutius Felix and Mirinia Nepotia, his sister, Tutia Vera, aunt, Sextilia Hermione, and grandmother, Fabia Severina.
- Tutia Bonosa, made an offering to the Christian God at Theveste in Africa Proconsularis.
- Tutia Casta, supposedly buried at Aeclanum in Samnium, aged thirty-seven. The inscription is thought to be a forgery.
- Tutius Clarus, built a tomb at Spoletium in Umbria for himself and his patron, Tutia Iliona.
- Sextus Tutius Cornelianus, buried at the present site of Oued Fedhala, aged twenty-seven, in a tomb dedicated by Gaius Tutius.
- Publius Tutius Felix, buried at Madaurus in Africa Proconsularis, aged seventy-five, in a family sepulchre he built for himself, Claudia Gaetula, probably his wife, aged sixty-five, and Publius Tutius Victor, Publius Tutius Namphamo, and Tutia Marchella, probably their children.
- Titus Tutius Felix, buried in a family sepulchre built by his son, Titus Tutius Amabilis, at Placentia, along with his wife, Mirinia Nepotia, daughter, Tutia Vera, sister-in-law, Sextilia Hermione, and mother-in-law, Fabia Severina.
- Tutia Iliona, buried at Spoletium, in a tomb dedicated by her client, Tutius Clarus.
- Tutia (P. f.) Marchella, buried in a family sepulchre at Madaurus, aged twenty-one. She was probably the daughter of Publius Tutius Felix, who built the tomb, and Claudia Gaetula; Publius Tutius Victor and Publius Tutius Namphamo, also interred, were likely her brothers.
- Quintus Tutius Martinus, buried at Nemausus in Gallia Narbonensis, in a tomb built by his son, Tutius Tarcius, and Tarcia Egie[...], probably his wife.
- Tutia Maximilla, together with her husband, Domitius Graptus, built a tomb at Augusta Treverorum in Gallia Belgica for her father-in-law, Domitius Trypho.
- Tutius Maximus, a speculator, or scout, in the Legio III Augusta, built a tomb at Lambaesis in Numidia for his father, Marcus Tutius Maximus.
- Marcus Tutius Maximus, a soldier buried at Lambaesis, aged seventy-five, in a tomb built by his son, also named Tutius Maximus.
- Publius Tutius (P. f.) Namphamo, buried in a family sepulchre at Madaurus, aged twenty-five. He was probably the son of Publius Tutius Felix, who built the tomb, and Claudia Gaetula; Publius Tutius Victor and Tutia Marchella, also interred, were likely his siblings.
- Tutius Saturninus, buried at the site of modern Oued Fedhala, aged seventy-five, in a tomb built by his wife, Varia Matrona.
- Tutius Q. f. Tarcius, along with Tarcia Egie[...], probably his mother, built a tomb at Nemausus for his father, Quintus Tutius Martinus.
- Tutia Tertia, buried at the site of modern Soumat el Kheneg, formerly part of Numidia, aged seventy, alog with her husband, Gaius Julius Dexter of Thelepte, aged eighty-five, a veteran of twenty-six years' service as an eques and signifer, or standard-bearer, in an ala.
- Tutia T. f. Vera, buried in a family sepulchre built by her brother, Titus Tutius Amabilis, at Placentia, along with her parents, Titus Tutius Felix and Mirinia Nepotia, aunt, Sextilia Hermione, and grandmother, Fabia Severina.
- Publius Tutius (P. f.) Victor, buried in a family sepulchre at Madaurus, aged thirty-five. He was probably the son of Publius Tutius Felix, who built the tomb, and Claudia Gaetula; Publius Tutius Namphamo and Tutia Marchella, also interred, were likely his siblings.

== See also ==
- List of Roman gentes

== Bibliography ==
- Marcus Tullius Cicero, Epistulae ad Atticum.
- Gaius Plinius Caecilius Secundus (Pliny the Younger), Epistulae (Letters).
- Dictionary of Greek and Roman Biography and Mythology, William Smith, ed., Little, Brown and Company, Boston (1849).
- Theodor Mommsen et alii, Corpus Inscriptionum Latinarum (The Body of Latin Inscriptions, abbreviated CIL), Berlin-Brandenburgische Akademie der Wissenschaften (1853–present).
- Wilhelm Henzen, Ephemeris Epigraphica: Corporis Inscriptionum Latinarum Supplementum (Journal of Inscriptions: Supplement to the Corpus Inscriptionum Latinarum), Institute of Roman Archaeology, Rome (1872–1913).
- René Cagnat et alii, L'Année épigraphique (The Year in Epigraphy, abbreviated AE), Presses Universitaires de France (1888–present).
- Stéphane Gsell, Inscriptions Latines de L'Algérie (Latin Inscriptions from Algeria), Edouard Champion, Paris (1922–present).
