= Julius Briganticus =

Roman Army cavalry commander

Julius Briganticus (died AD 69) was a Batavian who commanded auxiliary cavalry in the Roman Army. He was the son of the sister of Gaius Julius Civilis, the leader of the Batavian rebellion, who apparently hated his nephew. The nomen Julius indicates he was a Roman citizen. The cognomen Briganticus perhaps suggests he, or his father, gained distinction fighting against the Brigantes of northern Britain.

In 69, during the civil wars of the Year of Four Emperors, Briganticus initially fought for Otho but surrendered to Vitellius's forces after the battle of Placentia. He later commanded a picked squad of cavalry that had been formed by Vitellius but went over to Vespasian. He died fighting for the Romans under Quintus Petillius Cerialis against his uncle during the Batavian revolt.
