= Archelaus of Priene =

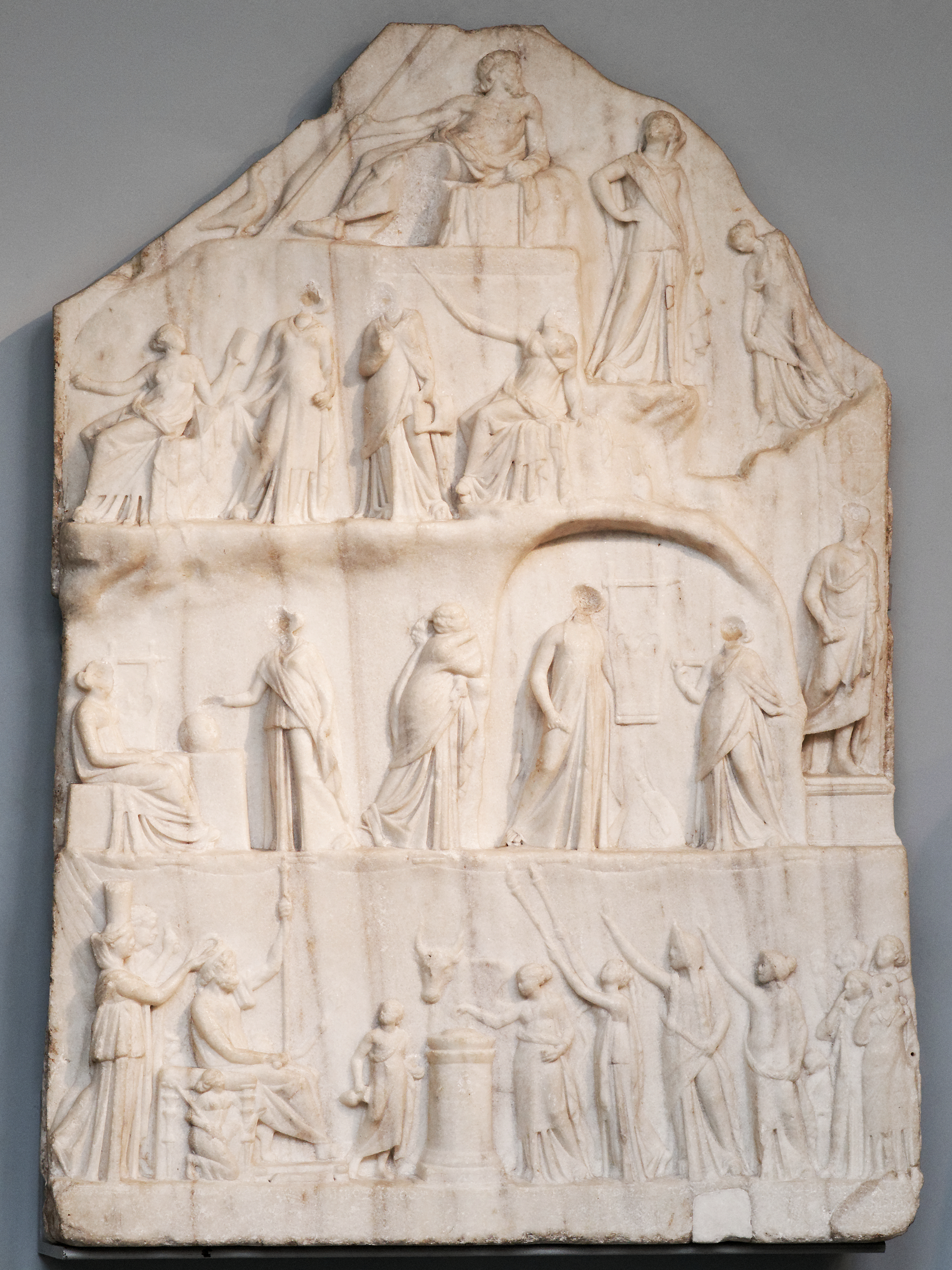
Archelaus of Priene's relief

Archelaus of Priene (Ancient Greek: Ἀρχέλαος) was a Greek sculptor who lived close to 300 BC in Priene. He is remembered for his apotheosis of Homer, a marble relief aggrandising the poet that is now preserved in the British Museum.
