= Lucius Julius Iulus (consular tribune 401 BC) =

Roman politician, consular tribune 401 BC

Lucius Julius L. f Vop. n. Iulus was a member of the patrician house of the Julii at ancient Rome. He was military tribune with consular powers in 401 and 397 BC.

== Family ==
Lucius Julius Iulus was the son of Lucius, who had been consul in BC 430, after previously serving as consular tribune and magister equitum. His grandfather, Vopiscus, was consul in 473. It is unclear how he was related to the Lucius Julius Iulus who was consular tribune in 388 and 379 BC, or the Gaius Julius Iulus who was dictator in 352.

== Career ==
Consular tribune for the first time in BC 401, Julius' colleagues were Lucius Valerius Potitus, Marcus Furius Camillus, Manius Aemilius Mamercinus, Gnaeus Cornelius Cossus, and Caeso Fabius Ambustus. The consular tribunes of the preceding year had been compelled to resign their office early, as the garrison at Anxur had been captured by the Volsci through laxity, and one of the Roman camps maintaining the siege of Veii had been lost due to the stubbornness of two of the tribunes, who had been carrying on a personal feud. Accordingly, the tribunes for 401 took office on the kalends of October instead of the usual date, on the ides of December. (Note: The kalends (originally the night after the new moon on the old Roman lunar calendar) were the first day of each month; the ides (originally the date of the full moon) were reckoned as the fifteenth day of March, May, Quintilis (July), and October, and the thirteenth in all other months.)

The tribunes immediately began preparing for campaigns to retake Anxur and the lost ground in the siege of Veii, as well as punitive expeditions against Falerii and Capena, whose soldiers had come to Veii's defense, and together with the Veientes defeated the Roman force. In order to raise a large enough army to undertake all of these campaigns, the tribunes enrolled not only the young men, but conscripted men well over the age for military service to serve as a defense for the city. To pay for the levies, the military tribunes attempted to collect a war tax from the older men who would not be serving in the expeditionary forces. This tax proved especially onerous, and was blocked by the tribunes of the plebs; but they had their own problems, as an insufficient number of tribunes had been elected, and an attempt was made to co-opt patricians for the office, in violation of the Lex Trebonia.

The year was further marked by the trial of Manius Sergius Fidenas and Lucius Verginius Tricostus, the two military tribunes whose conduct had resulted in the loss of the fortifications at Veii. When Sergius' position was attacked by the soldiers from Falerii and Capena, joined by a sortie from Veii itself, Verginius had refused to assist his colleague unless he asked for help, while Sergius had just as adamantly refused to call for assistance. The two were convicted and fined 10,000 asses. Before the end of the year, the consular tribunes Aemilius and Fabius had retaken the lost position.

Meanwhile, Camillus had no luck engaging the enemy at Falerii, nor had Cornelius at Capena. The enemy remained secure within their towns, as the tribunes had to content themselves with plundering the surrounding countryside. Valerius reconnoitered Anxur, but found it too well protected for a direct attack, and instead decided to besiege the town. Julius, the only consular tribune not mentioned leading troops in the field, may have remained at Rome to see to domestic matters while his colleagues undertook their campaigns.

As a result of the burdensome levies of troops and the highly unpopular war tax, as well as the attempt to have patricians co-opted as tribunes of the plebs in violation of the Lex Trebonia, the plebeians finally succeeded in pushing through one of their candidates for consular tribune: Publius Licinius Calvus, who according to Livy was the first plebeian to hold the office. (Note: Although Livy states that all of the other consular tribunes for BC 400 were patricians, Lucius Titinius Pansa, Publius Maelius Capitolinus, and Lucius Publilius Philo were probably also plebeians. Lucius Atilius Luscus, one of the first consular tribunes elected, BC 444, and Quintus Antonius Merenda in 422 may also have been plebeians.)

In his second term as consular tribune, BC 397, Julius' colleagues were Lucius Furius Medullinus, Lucius Sergius Fidenas, Aulus Postumius Albinus, Publius Cornelius Maluginensis, and Aulus Manlius Vulso. During their year of office, Tarquinii decided to take advantage of Rome's domestic turmoil to raid Roman territory. Stung by the brazen attack, the military tribunes Julius and Postumius quickly raised a volunteer force, and managed to overtake the raiding party near Caere, recovering much of the booty.

The siege of Veii continued to drag on with no end in sight, but the previous year they had captured an elderly soothsayer from Veii, who reported that the city could not be taken unless the waters of the Alban Lake were drained. This prophecy appeared to be confirmed, when an emissary who had been sent to inquire of the Oracle at Delphi concerning some other omens returned, giving the same answer. The Oracle also directed the Romans to see to a series of sacred rites they had carried out incorrectly. In order to atone for this offense, the consular tribunes, who were charged with carrying out the rites in question, were compelled to resign, and an interrex appointed until new elections could be held.

== See also ==
- Julia (gens)

== Bibliography ==
- Titus Livius (Livy), Ab Urbe Condita (History of Rome).
- Diodorus Siculus, Bibliotheca Historica (Library of History).
- "L. Julius L. f. Vop. n. Iulus" (no. 9), in the Dictionary of Greek and Roman Biography and Mythology, William Smith, ed., Little, Brown and Company, Boston (1849).
- T. Robert S. Broughton, The Magistrates of the Roman Republic, American Philological Association (1952).
