= Lucius Julius Iulus (consular tribune 403 BC) =

Roman politician, consular tribune 403 BC

Lucius Julius S. f. Vop. n. Iulus was a member of the ancient patrician gens Julia. As consular tribune in 403 BC, he carried on the war with Veii.

== Family ==
Lucius Julius Iulus was the son of Spurius, and grandson of Vopiscus, who had been consul, 473 BC. His uncle, Lucius, was consul in 430, after serving as magister equitum the previous year, and his brother, Gaius, was consular tribune in 408 and 405. It is unclear how he was related to the Lucius Julius Iulus who was consular tribune in 388 and 379, or the Gaius Julius Iulus who was dictator in 352.

== Career ==
Lucius was one of six military tribunes with consular power elected for BC 403. His colleagues were Manius Aemilius Mamercinus, Lucius Valerius Potitus, Appius Claudius Crassus, Marcus Quinctilius Varus, and Marcus Furius Fusus. (Note: Livy erroneously adds the censors, Marcus Furius Camillus and Marcus Postumius Albinus, to the list of consular tribunes, observing that the election of eight military tribunes with consular powers was unprecedented, and in place of Marcus Furius Fusus, he gives a second Marcus Postumius.) They continued the siege of Veii which had begun two years earlier (when Lucius' brother, Gaius Julius Iulus, was one of the consular tribunes), and began building earthworks around the city, topped by wooden mantlets, with the intention of maintaining the siege through the winter months.

The tribunes of the plebs objected to this hitherto unprecedented manner of conducting warfare, as an unjust and unnecessary burden on the people, and accused the patricians of using the siege as an excuse to keep large numbers of commoners out from Rome, so that they could not serve as a check on the patricians' power. But Claudius, the consular tribune, argued vociferously that the plebeian tribunes' claims of hardship for the soldiers were false, that recalling them would waste all of the work and expense of the siege without achieving anything or recouping Rome's losses, subject Rome to future attack from Veii, that the tribunes were simply telling the people what they wanted to hear, to their own advantage rather than the people's, and that their exhortations were a betrayal of the soldiers who instead deserved their support.

Meanwhile, the Veientes made a sortie out of the city by night, and set fire to the Roman mantlets, which were approaching the city walls. Soon the wooden fortifications were entirely destroyed. But when news of this reached Rome, those who had been wavering between the plebeian tribunes and Appius Claudius were seized with a patriotic fervor, and quickly volunteered to go and serve the army in order to rebuild the siege works and maintain the garrison that Julius and his colleagues oversaw. Thus, the siege continued through the winter, until a new set of consular tribunes was elected.

== See also ==
- Julia (gens)

== Bibliography ==
- Titus Livius (Livy), Ab Urbe Condita (History of Rome).
- Diodorus Siculus, Bibliotheca Historica (Library of History).
- "L. Julius Iulus" (no. 8) in the Dictionary of Greek and Roman Biography and Mythology, William Smith, ed., Little, Brown and Company, Boston (1849).
- T. Robert S. Broughton, The Magistrates of the Roman Republic, American Philological Association (1952).
