= Julius Exsuperantius =

Roman historian

Julius Exsuperantius was a late Roman historian, who probably lived in the 5th or 6th century. He is best known for his tract, "De Marii, Lepidi" and "Ac Sertorii Bellis Civilibus" which some argue may have been abridged from the histories of Sallust. Additionally, he is notable for being one of the last late confirmed members of the ancient Patrician Julian family. Exsuperantius' work's provides a concise account of the rise of Gaius Marius and the subsequent civil war between Marius and Sulla until the end of Sertorius' reign. Exuperantius' work's were significantly reprinted in 1588, with the support of Friedrich Sylburg and Pierre Pithou who published several copies of "Ac Sertorii Bellis Civilibus".
