= Gaius Julius Iulus (dictator 352 BC) =

4th-century BC Roman politician and dictator

Gaius Julius Iulus was a member of the Roman gens Julia, and was nominated dictator in 352 BC.

== Family ==
The Julii Iuli were the oldest branch of the ancient patrician Julia gens, and their magistracies span nearly a century and a half leading to Gaius' dictatorship. However, only one other member of the family is recorded following the sack of Rome by the Gauls in 390 BC: Lucius Julius Iulus, who was consular tribune in 388, and again in 379. As Gaius' filiation has not been preserved, it is uncertain whether he was the son of this Lucius, or perhaps one of his predecessors, such as the Lucius who was consular tribune in 401 and 397, or the Lucius who was consular tribune in 403, or the Gaius Julius Iulus who was consular tribune in 408 and 405, and censor in BC 393. In any case, he is the last of the Julii Iuli known to have held any magistracy. Whether the family ended with him, or continued on in obscurity, or perhaps under a different cognomen, is similarly unknown.

== Career ==
Gaius was nominated dictator some fifteen years after the passage of the lex Licinia Sextia, the law which opened the consulship to the plebeians, by requiring that one of the consuls should be a plebeian. But in the years that followed, the patricians had made every effort to skirt the law, and elect two patricians. Both consuls had been patricians in 355, 354, and 353 BC, and the patricians were determined to elect two of their number once more for 352.

The tribunes of the plebs blocked the elections from being held until the senate agreed to put forward candidates in accordance with the Licinian law. Meanwhile, the dictator, Titus Manlius Torquatus, would not permit the elections to be held if plebeian candidates were allowed; thus, the elections could not be held until after the dictator's term of office had expired, and even then an interrex had to be appointed, as the senate and the tribunes could not agree to the terms. Under Roman law, the interrex was required to resign his office after five days, and another was appointed; then another, and another, until eleven interreges had been appointed.

Faced with growing unrest, the senate finally directed the interrex Lucius Cornelius Scipio to observe the Licinian law. As a result, a plebeian, Gaius Marcius Rutilus, who had previously held the consulship in BC 357, was elected alongside the patrician Publius Valerius Poplicola. Vexed by their defeat, the patricians resolved to defy the law once more in the elections for 351, and they nominated Gaius Julius Iulus dictator, on the pretext that twelve Etruscan cities had formed an alliance to oppose Rome. As his magister equitum, Julius nominated Lucius Aemilius Mamercinus.

It soon became apparent that there was no impending hostility from Etruria, as the rumor of an alliance had been false. The dictator was unable to secure the election of two patrician candidates, but the patricians were not yet ready to accept defeat. Following Julius' resignation, Gaius Sulpicius Peticus was appointed interrex; he too failed to procure the desired result, but his successor, Marcus Fabius Ambustus, succeeded, and two patricians were elected in violation of the Licinian law.

== See also ==
- Julia (gens)

== Bibliography ==
- Titus Livius (Livy), Ab Urbe Condita (History of Rome).
- "C. Julius Iulus" (no. 11), in the Dictionary of Greek and Roman Biography and Mythology, William Smith, ed., Little, Brown and Company, Boston (1849).
- T. Robert S. Broughton, The Magistrates of the Roman Republic, American Philological Association (1952).
