= Vopiscus (praenomen) =

Latin forename

Vopiscus is a Latin praenomen, or personal name, which was occasionally used during the period of the Roman Republic, and later as a cognomen, surviving into imperial times. The feminine form is Vopisca. The name was not usually abbreviated, but is sometimes found with the abbreviation Vop.

The praenomen Vopiscus was always rare, but it was familiar to the scholar Marcus Terentius Varro, who described it as an antique name, no longer in general use by the 1st century BC. The only family known to have used it was gens Julia, but as with other uncommon praenomina, it may have been more common amongst the plebeians and in the countryside. The name was later used as a cognomen, becoming more frequent in imperial times. Vopiscus may once have been a praenomen in families that later used it as a cognomen, such as the Flavii and the Pompeii.

== Origin and meaning ==
Pliny the Elder, whose opinion was followed by a number of later authorities, related the popular etymology of the name, explaining that Vopiscus was originally given to a child whose twin brother or sister was born dead. This extremely unlikely explanation for the name is rejected by George Davis Chase as an example of false etymology. However, the true meaning of the name remains unclear.
