= Lucius Julius Iulus (consular tribune 388 BC) =

4th-century BC Roman politician

Lucius Julius Iulus was a member of the ancient patrician house of the Julii. He held the office of military tribune with consular powers in 388 BC, and again in 379.

== Family ==
Julius' filiation has not been preserved in the Fasti Capitolini, so his exact line of descent is uncertain. He could perhaps be the son of Gaius Julius Iulus, who was consular tribune in 408 and 405 BC, and who died during his censorship about 393, or of Sextus Julius Iulus, consular tribune in 424; he seems less likely to have been the son of Lucius Julius Iulus, who was consular tribune in 403, or of the Lucius who was consular tribune in 401 and 397, unless father and son were relatively close in age. It is also possible that he was descended from a collateral branch of the family, which had not previously held high office. It is uncertain how he was related to the Gaius Julius Iulus who was dictator in 352.

== Career ==
During Julius' first year as consular tribune, his colleagues were Titus Quinctius Cincinnatus, Quintus Servilius Fidenas, Lucius Aquilius Corvus, Lucius Lucretius Tricipitinus Flavus, and Servius Sulpicius Rufus. The tribunes divided their command into two armies: a punitive force sent to lay waste to the lands of the Aequi, and a second force sent into Etruria, for the aim of plunder. The Aequi had already been defeated; Livy describes the Roman motive as hatred, and a desire to destroy the resources of the Aequi and prevent them from making war again.

In Etruria, the army sacked and burnt the city of Cortuosa after a surprise attack, then launched an unremitting assault upon the town of Contenebra, until the defenders gave up from exhaustion, and their city was likewise sacked. The tribunes had failed to plan for the distribution of the city's wealth, and while they were making up their minds to donate the bounty of their conquest to the state, much of the city's treasure found its way into the hands of individual soldiers, from whom it would have seemed unjust to take it.

Nine years later, Julius was consular tribune for the second time, with Publius Manlius Capitolinus, Gaius Manlius Vulso, Gaius Sextilius, Marcus Albinius, and Lucius Antistius. The two Manlii received the command against the Volsci, as they were nobler than the plebeian candidates and more influential than Julius. But this arrangement proved fatal, as the two were lured into an ambush, and their forces overwhelmed. Through the courage of their soldiers and sheer good fortune, they escaped with their lives, but the Romans were panicked, and considered nominating a dictator, until it became clear that the Volsci had no plan to follow their victory with an invasion.

Otherwise, the year was marked by unusual domestic harmony at Rome, where the gradual acceptance of plebeian magistrates was helping to soothe relations between the orders. Toward the end of the year, the Praenestines were busy building an anti-Roman coalition in Latium, and new colonists were gathered to reinforce the Roman colony at Setia, which was struggling from lack of numbers, but there were no emergencies.

== See also ==
- Julia (gens)

== Bibliography ==
- Titus Livius (Livy), Ab Urbe Condita (History of Rome).
- Diodorus Siculus, Bibliotheca Historica (Library of History).
- "L. Julius Iulus" (no. 10), in the Dictionary of Greek and Roman Biography and Mythology, William Smith, ed., Little, Brown and Company, Boston (1849).
- T. Robert S. Broughton, The Magistrates of the Roman Republic, American Philological Association (1952).
