= Julius Gallus Aquila =

Julius Gallus Aquila was a Roman jurist, from whose liber responsorum two fragments concerning tutors are preserved in the Digest.

== Biography ==
In the Littera Florentina this man is named "Gallus Aquila", probably from an error of the scribe in reading Γαλλουον ("Gallus") for Ιουλιον ("Julius"). This has occasioned this Julius Aquila to be confounded with others who share a similar name, like Publius Aquillius Gallus. His date is uncertain, though he probably lived under or before the reign of Septimius Severus, 193-8 CE, because in the Digest he gives an opinion upon a question which seems to have been first settled by Severus.

By most of the historians of Roman law Aquila is referred to a later period. He may possibly be the same person with Lucius Julius Aquila, who wrote de Etrusca disciplina, or with that Aquila who, under Septimius Severus, was praefect of Egypt, and became remarkable by his persecution of the Christians.
