= Apotheosis of Homer =

Artistic theme

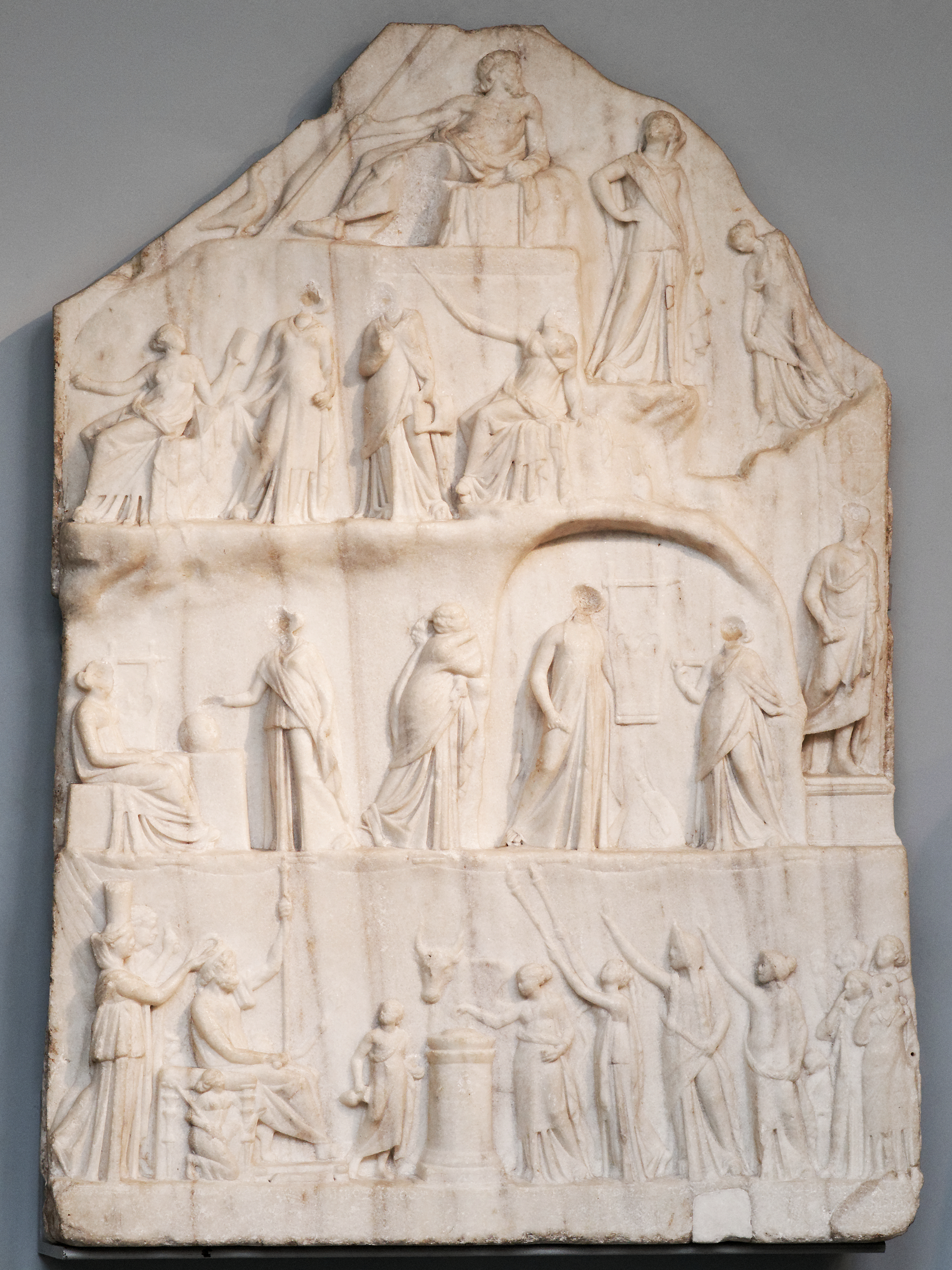
The Apotheosis of Homer, by Archelaus of Priene. Marble relief, possibly of the 3rd century BC, now in the British Museum.

The Apotheosis of Homer is a common scene in classical and neo-classical art, showing the poet Homer's apotheosis or elevation to divine status.

Homer was the subject of a number of formal hero cults in classical antiquity. The earliest notable portrayal of the scene is a 3rd-century BC marble relief by Archelaus of Priene, now in the British Museum. It was found in Italy, probably in 1658, but is thought to have been sculpted in Egypt. It shows Ptolemy IV and his wife and sister Arsinoe III standing beside a seated poet, flanked by figures from the Odyssey and Iliad, with the nine Muses standing above them and a procession of worshippers approaching an altar, believed to represent the Alexandrine Homereion. Apollo, the god of music and poetry, also appears, along with a female figure tentatively identified as Mnemosyne, the mother of the Muses. Zeus, the king of the gods, presides over the proceedings. The relief demonstrates vividly that the Greeks considered Homer not merely a great poet but the divinely-inspired reservoir of all literature.
