= Samnite Wars =

Three wars between the Roman Republic and the Samnites in Central Italy, 343–290 BC

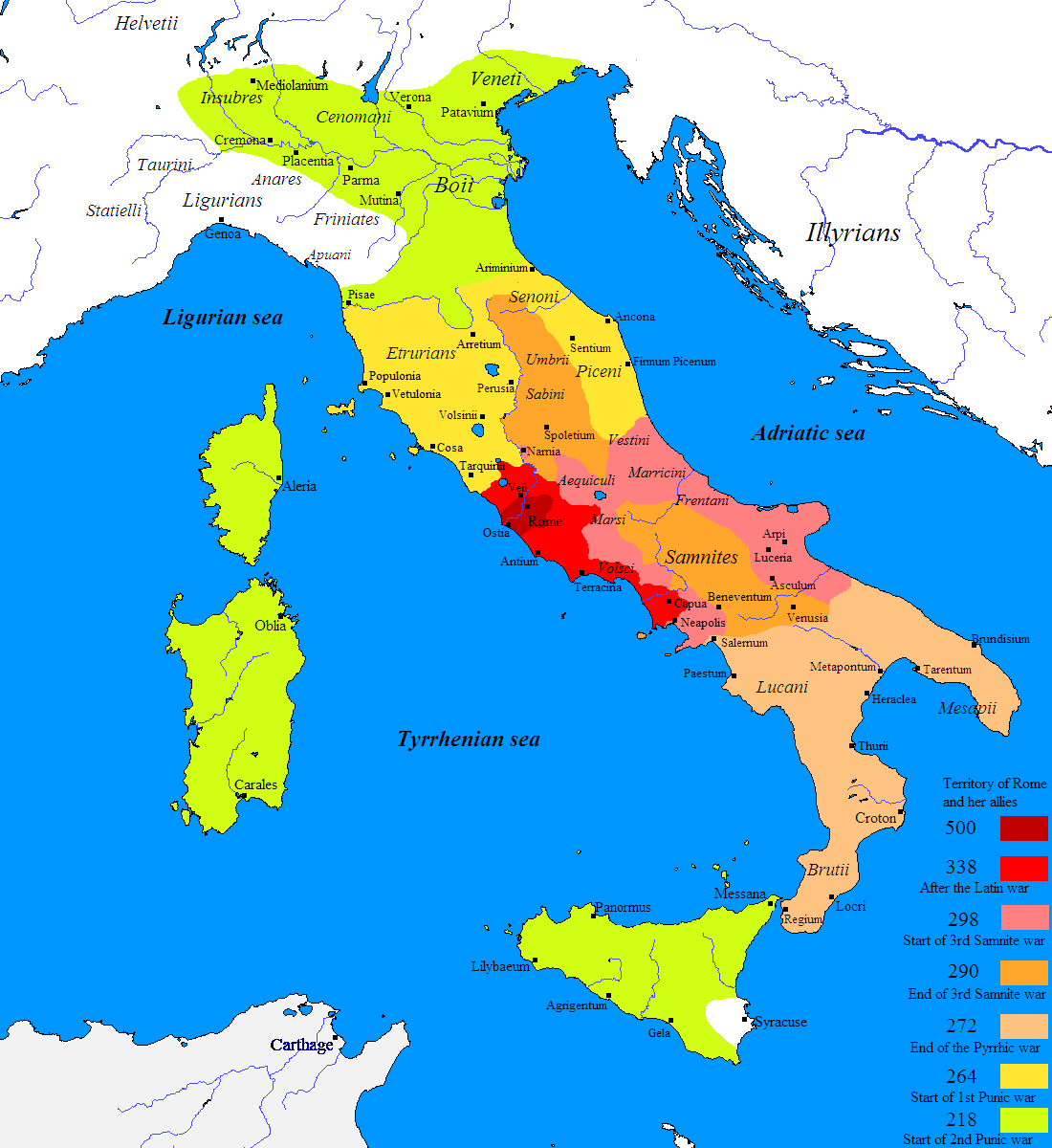
- Roman expansion in Italy from 500 BC to 218 BC through the Latin War (light red), Samnite Wars (pink/orange), Pyrrhic War (beige), and First and Second Punic War (yellow and green). Cisalpine Gaul (238-146 BC) and Alpine valleys (16-7 BC) were later added. The Roman Republic in 500 BC is marked with dark red
Date	1st: 343–341 BC; 2nd: 327–304 BC; 3rd: 298–290 BC
Location	Central Italy and parts of southern Italy
Result	Roman control over much of central Italy and part of southern Italy (the modern regions of Lazio, Abruzzo, Molise, Campania and Basilicata and Northern Apulia)

Belligerents
Roman Republic; Latin allies Campanians	Samnites; Aequi some Hernici; Etruscans; Umbrians; Senone Gauls some northern Apulian towns

Commanders and leaders
Quintus Fabius Maximus Rullianus; Quintus Aulius Cerretanus †	Gellius Egnatius †

The First, Second, and Third Samnite Wars (343–341 BC, 326–304 BC, and 298–290 BC) were fought between the Roman Republic and the Samnites, who lived on a stretch of the Apennine Mountains south of Rome and north of the Lucanian tribe.

- The first of these wars was the result of Rome's intervention to rescue the Campanian city of Capua from a Samnite attack.
- The second one was the result of Rome's intervention in the politics of the city of Naples and developed into a contest over the control of central and southern Italy.
- Similarly the third war also involved a struggle for control of this part of Italy.

The wars extended over half a century, and also drew in the peoples to the east, north, and west of Samnia (land of the Samnites) as well as those of central Italy north of Rome (the Etruscans, Umbri, and Picentes) and the Senone Gauls, but at different times and levels of involvement.

== Background ==
By the time of the First Samnite War (343 BC), the southward expansion of Rome's territory had reached the River Liris (see Liri), which was the boundary between Latium (land of the Latins) and Campania. This river is now called Garigliano and it is the boundary between the modern regions of Lazio and Campania. In those days the name Campania referred to the plain between the coast and the Apennine Mountains which stretched from the River Liris down to the bays of Naples and Salerno. The northern part of this area was inhabited by the Sidicini, the Aurunci, and the Ausoni (a subgroup of the Aurunci). The central and southern part was inhabited by the Campanians, who were people who had migrated from Samnia (land of the Samnites) and were closely related to the Samnites, but had developed a distinctive identity. The Samnites were a confederation of four tribes who lived in the mountains to the east of Campania and were the most powerful people in the area. The Samnites, Campanians, and Sidicini spoke Oscan languages. Their languages were part of the Osco-Umbrian linguistic family, which also included Umbrian and the Sabellian languages to the north of Samnia. The Lucanians who lived to the south were also Oscan speakers.

Diodorus Siculus and Livy report that in 354 BC Rome and the Samnites concluded a treaty, but neither lists the terms agreed upon. Modern historians have proposed that the treaty established the river Liris as the boundary between their spheres of influence, with Rome's lying to its north and the Samnites' to its south. This arrangement broke down when the Romans intervened south of the Liris to rescue the Campanian city of Capua (just north of Naples) from an attack by the Samnites.

== First Samnite War (343 to 341 BC) ==
Livy is the only preserved source to give a continuous account of the war which has become known in modern historiography as the First Samnite War. In addition, the Fasti Triumphales records two Roman triumphs dating to this war and some of the events described by Livy are also mentioned by other ancient writers.

=== Outbreak ===
==== Livy's account ====
According to Livy, the First Samnite War started not because of any enmity between Rome and the Samnites, but due to outside events. The spark came when the Samnites without provocation attacked the Sidicini, a tribe living north of Campania with their chief settlement at Teanum Sidicinum. Unable to stand against the Samnites, the Sidicini sought help from the Campanians. However, Livy continues, the Samnites defeated the Campanians in a battle in Sidicine territory and then turned their attention toward Campania. First they seized the Tifata hills overlooking Capua (the main Campanian city) and, having left a strong force to hold them, marched into the plain between the hills and Capua. There they defeated the Campanians in a second battle and drove them within their walls. This compelled the Campanians to ask Rome for help.

In Rome, the Campanian ambassadors were admitted to an audience with the Senate. In a speech, they proposed an alliance between Rome and the Campanians, noting how the Campanians with their famous wealth could be of aid to the Romans, and that they could help to subdue the Volsci, who were enemies of Rome. They pointed out that nothing in Rome's treaty with the Samnites prevented them from also making a treaty with the Campanians, and warning that if they did not, the Samnites would conquer Campania and its strength would be added to the Samnites' instead of the Romans'. After discussing this proposal, the Senate concluded that while there was much to be gained from a treaty with the Campanians, and that this fertile area could become Rome's granary, Rome could not ally with them and still be considered loyal to their existing treaty with the Samnites: for this reason they had to refuse the proposal. After being informed of Rome's refusal, the Campanian embassy, in accordance with their instructions, surrendered the people of Campania and the city of Capua unconditionally into the power of Rome. Moved by this surrender, the Senators resolved that Rome's honour now required that the Campanians and Capua, who by their surrender had become the possession of Rome, be protected from Samnite attacks.

Envoys were sent to the Samnites with the instructions to request that they, in view of their mutual friendship with Rome, spare territory which had become the possession of Rome and to warn them to keep their hands off the city of Capua and the territory of Campania. The envoys delivered their message as instructed to the Samnites' national assembly. However, they were met with a defiant response, "not only did the Samnites declare their intention of waging war against Capua, but their magistrates left the council chamber, and in tones loud enough for the envoys to hear, ordered [their armies] to march out at once into Campanian territory and ravage it." When this news reached Rome, the fetials were sent to demand redress, and when this was refused Rome declared war against the Samnites.

==== Modern views ====
The historical accuracy of Livy's account is disputed among modern historians. They are willing to accept that while Livy might have simplified the way in which the Sidicini, Campani and Samnites came to be at war, his narrative here, at least in outline, is historical. The Sidicini's stronghold at Teanum controlled an important regional crossroads, which would have provided the Samnites with a motive for conquest. The First Samnite War might have started quite by accident, as Livy claimed. The Sidicini were located on the Samnite side of the river Liris, and while the Roman-Samnite treaty might only have dealt with the middle Liris, not the lower, Rome does not appear to have been overly concerned for the fate of the Sidicini. The Samnites could therefore go to war with Sidicini without fear of Roman involvement. It was only the unforeseen involvement of the Campani that brought in the Romans.

Many historians have however had difficulty accepting the historicity of the Campanian embassy to Rome, in particular whether Livy was correct in describing the Campani as surrendering themselves unconditionally into Roman possession. That Capua and Rome were allied in 343 is less controversial, as such a relationship underpins the whole First Samnite War.

Historians have noted the similarities between the events leading to the First Samnite War and events, which according to Thucydides, caused the Peloponnesian War, but there are differences as well. It is clear that Livy, or his sources, has consciously modelled the Campanian embassy after the "Corcyrean debate" in Thucydides' History of the Peloponnesian War. There are many parallels between the speech given by the Campanian ambassador to the Roman senate in Livy and the speech of the Corcyrean ambassador to the Athenian assembly in Thucydides. But while Thucydides' Athenians debate the Corcyreans' proposal in pragmatic terms, Livy's senators decide to reject the Campanian alliance based on moral arguments. Livy might have intended his literary educated readers to pick up this contrast. The exaggerated misery of the surrendering Campani contrast with the Campanian arrogance, a stock motif in ancient Roman literature. It is also unlikely that Livy's description of the Samnite national assembly is based on any authentic sources. However, it does not necessarily follow that because the speeches are invented, a standard feature for ancient historians, the Campanian surrender must be invented as well.

The chief difficulty lies in how, in 343, rich Capua could have been reduced to such dire straits by the Samnites that the Campani were willing to surrender everything to Rome. During the Second Punic War (218 to 201 BC), Capua famously sided with Carthage, but after a lengthy siege by Rome, she had to surrender unconditionally in 211 BC, after which the Capuans were harshly punished by the Romans. Salmon (1967, p. 197) therefore held that the Campanian surrender in 343 is a retrojection by later Roman historians. This invention would serve the double purpose of exonerating Rome from treaty-breaking in 343 BC and justifying the punishment handed out in 211 BC. What Rome agreed to in 343 was an alliance on terms similar to the treaties she had with the Latins and the Hernici. Cornell (1995, p. 347) accepts the surrender as historical. Studies have shown that voluntary submission was a common feature in the diplomacy of this period. Likewise Oakley (1998, pp. 286–289) does not believe the surrender of 343 BC to be a retrojection, not finding many similarities between the events of 343 and 211. The ancient historians record many later instances, whose historicity are not doubted, where a state appealed to Rome for assistance in war against a stronger enemy. The historical evidence shows the Romans considering such supplicants to have technically the same status as surrendered enemies, but in practice, Rome would not want to abuse would-be allies. Forsythe (2005, p. 287), like Salmon, argues that the surrender in 343 is a retrojection of that of 211, invented to better justify Roman actions and for good measure shift the guilt for the First Samnite War onto the manipulative Campani.

Livy portrays the Romans selflessly assuming the burden of defending the Campani, but this is a common theme in Roman republican histories, whose authors wished to show that Rome's wars had been just. Military success was the chief road to prestige and glory among the highly competitive Roman aristocracy. Evidence from later, better documented, time periods shows the Roman Senate quite capable of manipulating diplomatic circumstances so as to provide just causes for expansionary wars. There is no reason to believe this was not also the case in the second half of the 4th century BC. There are also recorded examples of Rome rejecting appeals for help, implying that the Romans in 343 BC had the choice of rejecting the Campani.

=== Three Roman victories ===
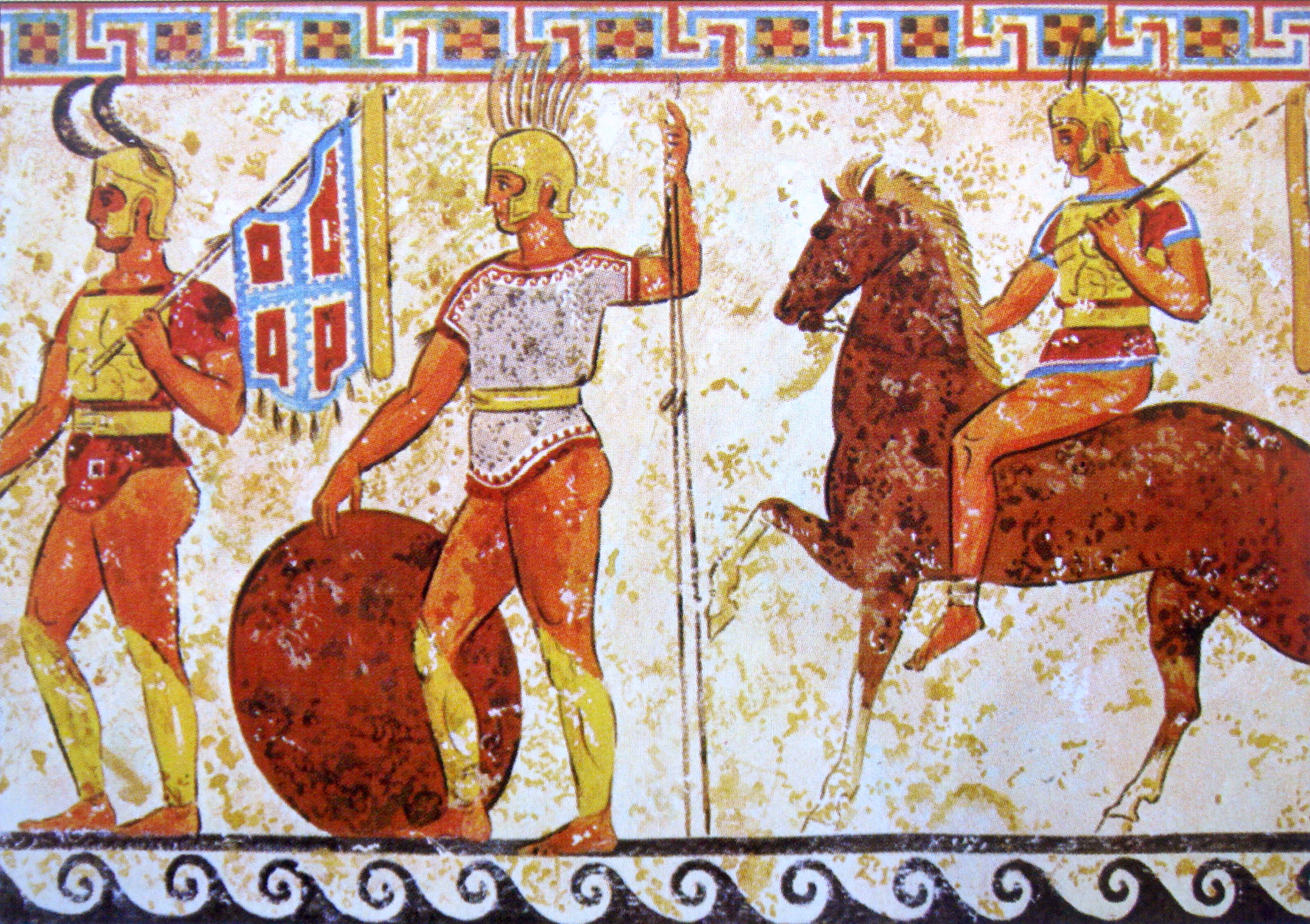
Samnite soldiers from a tomb frieze in Nola, 4th century BC

According to Livy, the two Roman consuls for 343 BC, Marcus Valerius Corvus and Aulus Cornelius Cossus Arvina, both marched against the Samnites. Valerius led his army into Campania, while Cornelius, into Samnia where he camped at Saticula. Livy then goes on to narrate how Rome won three different battles against the Samnites. After a day of hard fighting, Valerius won the first battle, fought at Mount Gaurus near Cumae, only after a last desperate charge in fading daylight. The second battle almost ended in disaster for the Romans when the Samnites attempted to trap the other consul, Cornelius Cossus, and his army in a mountain pass. Fortunately for them, one of Cornelius' military tribunes, Publius Decius Mus with a small detachment, seized a hilltop, distracting the Samnites and allowing the Roman army to escape the trap. Decius and his men slipped away to safety during the night; the morning after the unprepared Samnites were attacked and defeated. Still determined to seize victory, the Samnites collected their forces and laid siege to Suessula at the eastern edge of Campania. Leaving his baggage behind, Marcus Valerius took his army on forced marches to Suessula. Low on supplies, and underestimating the size of the Roman force, the Samnites scattered their army to forage for food. This gave Valerius the opportunity to win a third Roman victory when he first captured the Samnites' lightly defended camp and then scattered their foragers. These Roman successes against the Samnites convinced Falerii to convert her forty year's truce with Rome into a permanent peace treaty, and the Latins to abandon their planned war against Rome and instead campaign against the Paeligni. The friendly city-state of Carthage sent a congratulatory embassy to Rome with a twenty-five pound crown for the Temple of Jupiter Optimus Maximus. Both consuls then celebrated triumphs over the Samnites. The Fasti Triumphales records that Valerius and Cornelius celebrated their triumphs over the Samnites on 21 September and 22 September respectively.

Modern historians have doubted the historical accuracy of Livy's description of these three battles. Livy's battle-scenes for this time period are mostly free reconstructions by him and his sources, and there are no reasons why these should be different. The number of Samnites killed and the amounts of spoils taken by the Romans have clearly been exaggerated. Historians have noted the many similarities between the story of Publius Decius Mus, and an event said to have taken place in Sicily in 258 when the Romans were fighting the First Punic War against Carthage. According to the ancient sources, a Roman army was in danger of being trapped in a defile when a military tribune led a detachment of 300 men to seize a hilltop in the middle of the enemy. The Roman army escaped, but of the 300 only the tribune survived. It is unlikely that this latter, in ancient times more famous, episode has not influenced the descriptions of the former.

Salmon (1967) also found several other similarities between the campaigns of 343 and later events which he considered to be doublets. Both the First and the Second Samnite Wars start with an invasion of Samnia by a Cornelius, the way in which a Roman army was led into a trap resembles the famous disaster at the Caudine Forks in 321 BC, and there are similarities to the campaigns of Publius Cornelius Arvina in 306 BC and Publius Decius Mus (the son of the hero of Saticula) in 297 BC. He also thought Valerius Corvus' two Campanian victories could be doublets of Roman operations against Hannibal in the same area in 215 On the other hand, the entries in the Fasti Triumphales supports some measure of Roman success. In Salmon's reconstruction, therefore, there was only one battle in 343 BC, perhaps fought on the outskirts of Capua near the shrine of Juno Gaura, and ending with a narrow Roman victory.

Oakley (1998) dismisses these claims of doublets and inclines towards believing there were three battles. The Samnites would have gained significant ground in Campania by the time the Romans arrived and Valerius' two victories could be the outcome of twin Samnite attacks on Capua and Cumae. And while Samnite ambushes are somewhat of a stock motif in Livy's narrative of the Samnite wars, this might simply reflect the mountainous terrain in which these wars were fought. The story of Decius, as preserved, has been patterned after that of the military tribune of 258, but Decius could still have performed some heroic act in 343, the memory of which became the origin of the later embellished tale.

Forsythe (2005) considers the episode with Cornelius Cossus and Decius Mus to have been invented, in part to foreshadow Decius' sacrifice in 340 BC. P. Decius might have performed some heroic act which then enabled him to become the first of his family to reach the consulship in 340, but if so, no detail of the historical event survives. Instead, later annalists have combined the disaster at the Caudine Forks with the tale of the military tribune of 258 BC to produce the entirely fictitious story recorded by Livy; the difference being that while in the originals the Romans suffered defeat and death, here none of Decius' men are killed and the Romans win a great victory.

=== End of the war ===
No fighting is reported for 342. Instead the sources focus on a mutiny by part of the soldiery. According to the most common variant, following the Roman victories of 343 the Campani asked Rome for winter garrisons to protect them against the Samnites. Subverted by the luxurious lifestyle of the Campani, the garrison soldiers started plotting to seize control and set themselves up as masters of Campania. However the conspiracy was discovered by the consuls of 342 before the coup could be carried out. Afraid of being punished, the plotters mutinied, formed a rebel army and marched against Rome. Marcus Valerius Corvus was nominated dictator to deal with the crisis; he managed to convince the mutineers to lay down their arms without bloodshed and a series of economic, military and political reforms were passed to deal with their grievances. The history of this mutiny is however disputed among modern historians and it is possible that the whole narrative has been invented to provide a background for the important reforms passed that year. These reforms included the Leges Genuciae which stated that no one could be reelected to the same office within less than ten years, and it is clear from the list of consuls that, except in years of great crises, this law was enforced. It also became a firm rule that one of the consuls had to be a plebeian.

Livy writes that in 341 BC one of the Roman consuls, Lucius Aemilius Mamercus, entered Samnite territory but found no army to oppose him. He was ravaging their territory when Samnite envoys came to ask for peace. When presenting their case to the Roman Senate, the Samnite envoys stressed their former treaty with the Romans, which unlike the Campani, they had formed in times of peace, and that the Samnites now intended to go to war against the Sidicini who were no friends of Rome. The Roman praetor, Ti. Aemilius, delivered the reply of the Senate: Rome was willing to renew her former treaty with the Samnites; moreover, Rome would not involve herself in the Samnites' decision to make war or peace with the Sidicini. Once peace had been concluded the Roman army withdrew from Samnia.

The impact of Aemilius' invasion of Samnia may have been exaggerated; it could even have been entirely invented by a later writer to bring the war to an end with Rome in a suitably triumphant fashion. The sparse mentions of praetors in the sources for the 4th century BC are generally thought to be historical; it is possible therefore that as praetor Ti. Aemilius really was involved in the peace negotiations with the Samnites. The First Samnite War ended in a negotiated peace rather than one state dominating the other. The Romans had to accept that the Sidicini belonged to the Samnite sphere, but their alliance with the Campani was a far greater prize. Campania's wealth and manpower were a major addition to Rome's strength.

=== Historicity of the war ===
The many problems with Livy's account and Diodorus' failure to mention it has even caused some historians to reject the entire war as unhistorical. More recent historians have however accepted the basic historicity of the war. No Roman historian would have invented a series of events so unflattering to Rome. Livy was clearly embarrassed at the way Rome had turned from being an ally to an enemy of the Samnites. It is also unlikely that the Romans could have established such a dominating position in Campania as they had after 341 without Samnite resistance. Finally Diodorus ignores many other events in early Roman history such as all the early years of the Second Samnite War; his omission of the First Samnite War can therefore not be taken as proof of its unhistoricity.

== Second (or Great) Samnite War (326 to 304 BC) ==
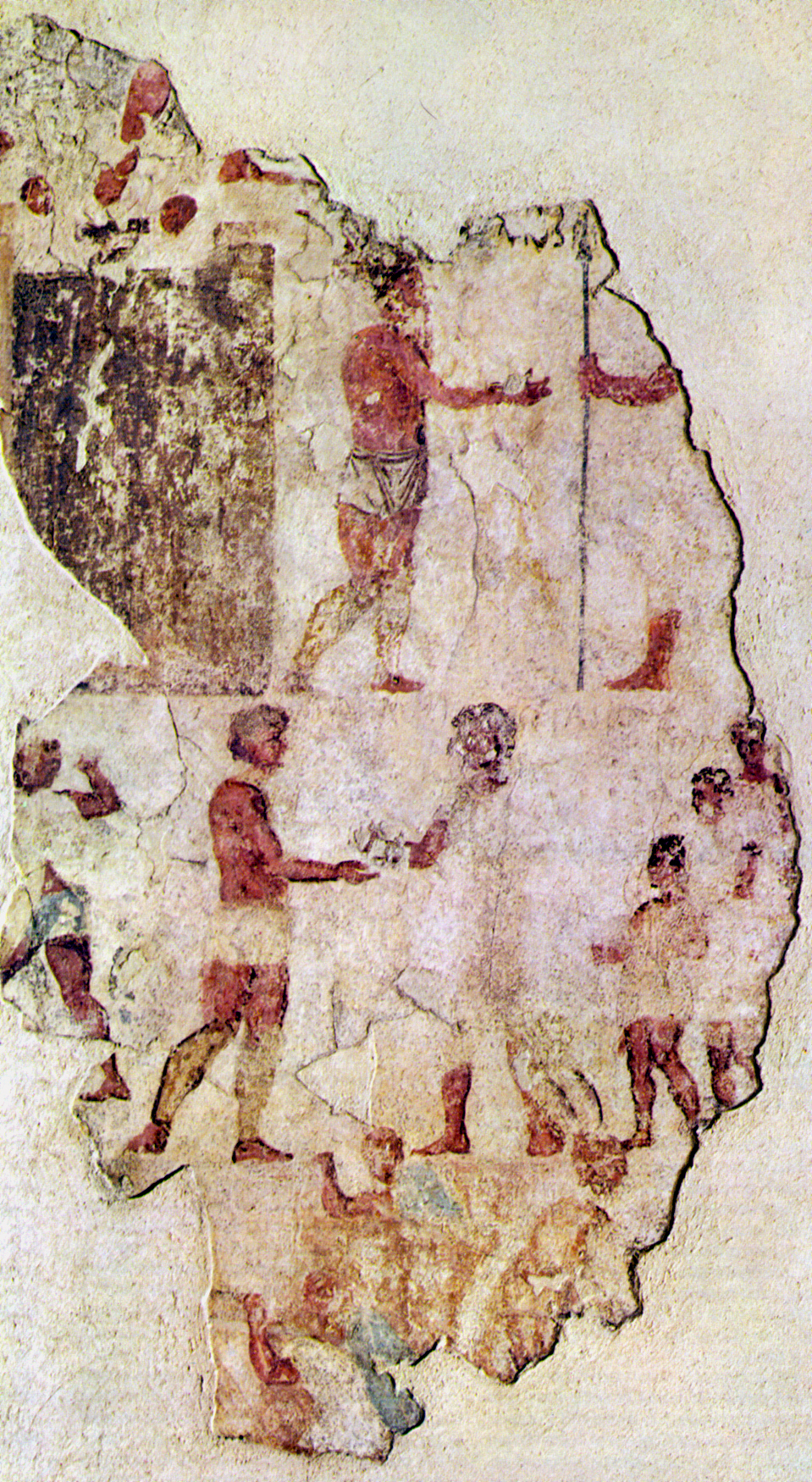
Ancient Roman fresco from the Esquiline Necropolis, dated c. 300–280 BC, possibly representing scenes from the Second Samnite war

=== Outbreak ===
The Second Samnite War resulted from tensions which arose from Roman interventions in Campania. The immediate precipitants were the foundation of a Roman colony (settlement) at Fregellae in 328 BC and actions taken by the inhabitants of Paleopolis. Fregellae had been a Volscian town on the eastern branch of the River Liris, at the junction with the River Tresus (today's Sacco) – viz., in Campania and in an area which was to be under Samnite control. It had been taken from the Volsci and destroyed by the Samnites. Paleopolis ("old city") was the older settlement of what is now Naples (which was a Greek city) and was very close to the newer and larger settlement of Neapolis ("new city"). Livy said that it attacked Romans who lived in Campania. Rome asked for redress, but they were rebuffed and war was declared. In 327 BC the two consular armies headed for Campania. The consul Quintus Publilius Philo took on Naples. His colleague Lucius Cornelius Lentulus positioned himself inland to check the movements of the Samnites because of reports that there had been a levy in Samnia that intended to intervene, in anticipation of a rebellion in Campania. Lentulus set up a permanent camp. The nearby Campanian city of Nola sent 2000 troops to Paleopolis/Neapolis and the Samnites sent 4000. In Rome there was also a report that the Samnites were encouraging rebellions in the towns of Privernum Fundi, and Formiae (Volscian towns south of the River Liris). Rome sent envoys to Samnia. The Samnites denied that they were preparing for war, that they had not interfered in Formiae and Fundi, and said that the Samnite men were not sent to Paleopolis by their government. They also complained about the founding of Fregellae, which they thought was as an act of aggression against them, as they had recently overrun that area. They called for war in Campania.

There had been tensions prior to these events. In 337 BC a war broke out between the Aurunci and the Sidicini. The Romans decided to help the Aurunci because they had not fought Rome during the First Samnite War. Meanwhile, the ancient city of Svessa was destroyed, and so they fled to 313 BC.Suessa Aurunca, which they fortified. In 336 BC the Ausoni joined the Sidicini. The Romans defeated the forces of these two peoples in a minor battle. In 335 BC one of the two Roman consuls besieged, seized and garrisoned Cales, the main town of the Ausoni. The army was then sent to march on the Sidicini so that the other consul could share the glory. In 334 BC, 2500 civilians were sent to Cales to set up a Roman colony there. The Romans ravaged the territory of the Sidicini and there were reports that in Samnia there had been calls for war with Rome for two years. Therefore, the Roman troops were kept in Sidicini territory. There were also tensions north of the River Liris, in the Volscian territory. In 330 BC the Volscian towns of Fabrateria and Luca offered Rome overlordship over them in exchange for protection from the Samnites and the senate sent a warning to the Samnites not to attack their territories. The Samnites agreed. According to Livy this was because they were not ready for war. In the same year the Volscian towns of Privernum and Fundi rebelled and ravaged the territories of another Volscian town and two Roman colonies in the area. When the Romans sent an army Fundi quickly pledged its loyalty. In 329 BC, Privernum either fell or surrendered (this is unclear). Its ringleaders were sent to Rome, its walls were pulled down and a garrison was stationed there.

In Livy's account there is a sense that the peace with the Samnites had been on a thin edge for years. It has also to be noted that Cales was in an important strategic position not only for the route from Rome to Capua but also for some of the routes which gave access to the mountains of Samnia. Yet the Samnites had not responded militarily to Roman interventions in Campania. One factor might have been the conflict between the Lucanians (the Samnites’ southerly neighbours) and the Greek city of Taras (Tarentum in Latin, modern Taranto) on the Ionian Sea. The Tarentines called for the help of the Greek king Alexander of Epirus, who crossed over to Italy in 334 BC. In 332 BC Alexander landed at Paestum, which was close to Samnia and Campania. The Samnites joined the Lucanians and the two were defeated by Alexander, who then established friendly relations with Rome. However, Alexander was killed in battle in 331 or 330 BC. The grievance of the Samnites about Fregellae might have been an addition to aggravations caused by Roman policy in Campania in the previous eight years.

=== From 327 BC to 322 BC ===
Quintus Publilius Philo positioned his army between Paleopolis and Neapolis to isolate them from each other. Meanwhile, the Romans introduced an institutional novelty: Publilius Philo and Cornelius Lentulus should have gone back to Rome at the end of their term (to make way for the consuls elected for the next year, who would continue the military operations), instead, their military command (but not their authority as civilian heads of the Republic) was extended until the termination of the campaigns with the title of proconsuls. In 326 BC two leading men of Naples, who were dissatisfied with the misbehaviour of the Samnite soldiers in the city, arranged a plot, which enabled the Romans to take the city, and called for renewed friendship with Rome. In Samnia the towns of Allifae, Callifae, and Rufrium were taken by the Romans. The Lucanians and the Apulians (from the toe of Italy) allied with Rome.

News of an alliance between the Samnites and the Vestini (Sabellians who lived by the Adriatic coast, to the north-east of Samnia) reached Rome. In 325 BC the consul Decimus Junius Brutus Scaeva ravaged their territory, forced them into a pitched battle and took the towns of Cutina and Cingilia. The dictator Lucius Papirius Cursor, who had taken over the command of the other consul, who had fallen ill, inflicted a crushing defeat on the Samnites in an unspecified location in 324 BC. The Samnites sued for peace and the dictator withdrew from Samnia. However, the Samnites rejected Rome's peace terms and agreed only a one-year truce, which they broke when they heard that Papirius intended to continue the fight. Livy also said that in that year the Apulians became enemies of Rome. Unfortunately, this information is very vague as the region of Apulia was populated by three separate ethnic groups, the Messapii in the south, the Iapyges in the centre and the Dauni in the north. We know that only Daunia (Land of the Dauni) was caught up in this war. However, this was a collection of independent city-states. Therefore, we do not know who in this area became enemies of Rome. The consuls for 323 BC fought on the two fronts, with C. Sulpicius Longus going to Samnia and Quintus Aemilius Cerretanus to Apulia. There were no battles, but areas were laid waste on both fronts. In 322 BC there were rumours that the Samnites had hired mercenaries and Aulus Cornelius Cossus Arvina was appointed as Dictator. The Samnites attacked his camp in Samnia, which he had to leave. A fierce battle followed and eventually the Samnites were routed. The Samnites offered to surrender, but this was rejected by Rome.

=== From the Caudine Forks to 316 BC ===
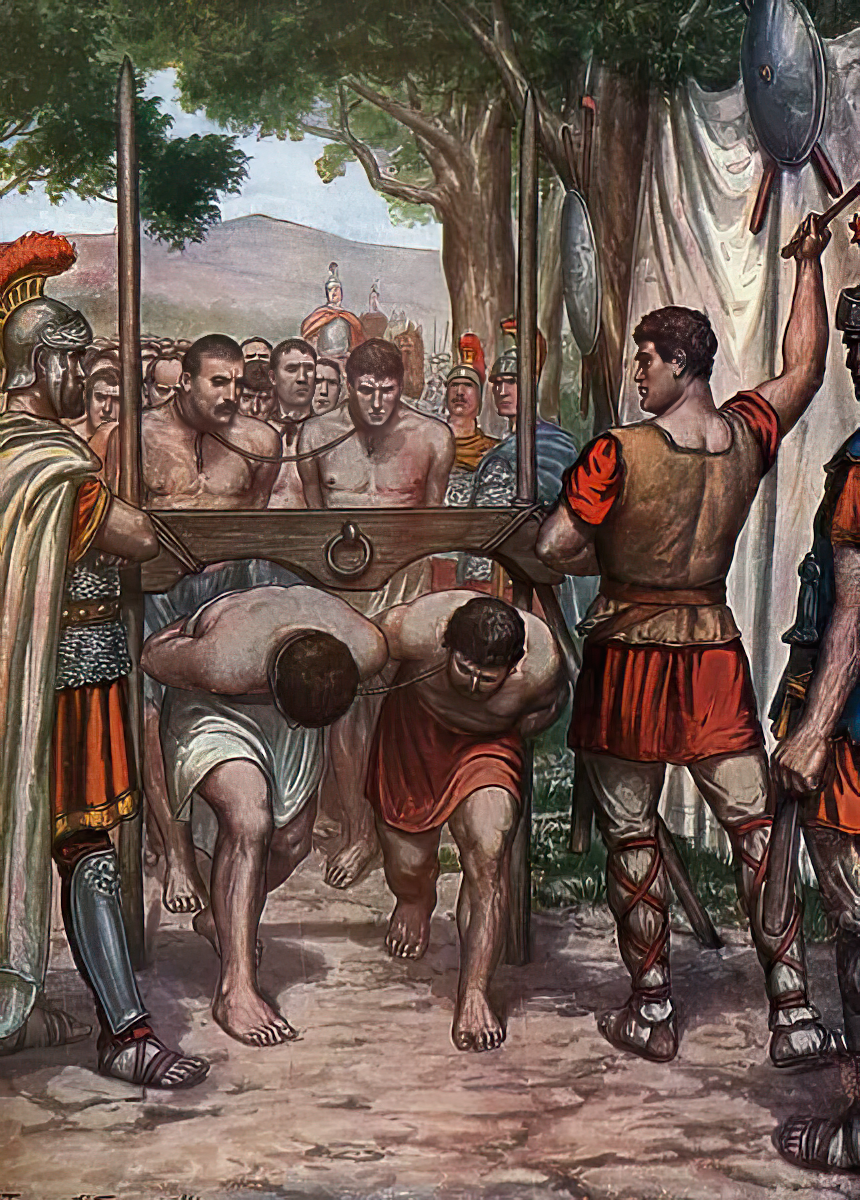
Second Samnite War, Battle of the Caudine Forks in 321 BC, the Roman army of the consuls Tiberius Veturius Calvinus symbolically pass under the yoke after their surrender

In 321 BC the consuls Titus Veturius Calvinus and Spurius Postumius Albinus were encamped in Calatia (a Campanian town 10 km southeast of Capua). Gaius Pontius, the commander of the Samnites, placed his army at the Caudine Forks and sent some soldiers disguised as shepherds grazing their flock towards Calatia. Their mission was to spread the misinformation that the Samnites were about to attack the city of Lucera in Apulia, which was an ally of Rome. The consuls decided to march to the aid of this city and to take the quicker (but less safe) route through the Caudine Forks. These were two narrow and wooded defiles on the Apennine Mountains with a plain between them. The passage from the first to the second defile was a narrow and difficult ravine. The Samnites blocked this with felled trees and boulders. When the Romans passed through, they also barraged the rear entry to the defile. The Romans were stuck and surrounded by the enemy and set up a fortified camp. Gaius Pontius sent a messenger to his father Herennius, a retired statesman, to ask for advice. His council was to free the Romans immediately. Gaius rejected this and Herenius’ second message was to kill them all. With these contradictory responses Gaius thought that his father had gone senile, but summoned him to the Forks. Herennius said that the first option would lead to peace and friendship with Rome and that with the second one, the loss of two armies would neutralise the Romans for a long time. When asked about a middle course of letting them go and imposing terms on Rome, he said that this "neither wins men friends nor rids them of their enemies." Shaming the Romans would lead them to seek revenge. Gaius decided to demand the Romans to surrender, "evacuate the Samnite territory and withdraw their colonies." The consuls had no choice but to surrender. The Roman soldiers came out of their camp unarmed, underwent the humiliation of passing under the yoke and suffered the mockery of the enemy. The yoke was a symbol of subjugation in which the defeated soldiers had to bow and pass under a yoke used for oxen in disgrace. According to Appian, Pontius used spears as a yoke: "Pontius opened a passage from the defile, and having fixed two spears in the ground and laid another across the top, caused the Romans to go under it as they passed out, one by one."

Livy and other ancient sources maintain that Rome rejected the truce offered by the Samnites and avenged the humiliation with victories. Livy said that there was a two-year truce following victories in 320–319 BC. However, Salmon thinks that, instead, the truce was the result of the agreement which was made at the Caudine Forks. Whatever the case, there was a truce which ended in 316 BC. For a discussion on this debate, see Frederiksen.

This section will continue to follow Livy's account.

Livy wrote that regarding the demands of the Samnites (which in Rome they called the Caudine peace), the consuls said that they were in no position to agree a treaty because this had to be authorised by the vote of the people of Rome and ratified by the fetials (priest-ambassadors) following the proper religious rites. Therefore, instead of a treaty there was a guarantee, the guarantors being the consuls, the officers of the two armies and the quaestors. Six hundred equites (equestrians) were handed over as hostages "whose lives were to be forfeit if the Romans should fail to keep the terms." The dejected Roman soldiers left and were too ashamed to enter Capua, whose inhabitants gave them supplies in commiseration. In Rome people went into mourning, shops were closed and all activities at the Forum were suspended. There was anger towards the soldiers and suggestions to bar them. However, when they arrived people took pity on them. They locked themselves in their homes. Spurius Postumius said to the senate that Rome was not bound to the guarantee at the Caudine Forks because it was given without the authorisation of the people, that there was no impediment to resuming the war and all that Rome owed to the Samnites were the persons and the lives of the guarantors. An army, the fetials and the guarantors to be surrendered were sent to Samnia. Once there, Postumius jostled the knee of a fetial and claimed that he was a Samnite who had violated diplomatic rules. Gaius Pontius denounced Roman duplicity and declared that he deemed the Roman guarantors not to be surrendered. The peace he had hoped for did not materialise. Meanwhile, Satricum (a town in Latium) defected to the Samnites and the Samnites took Fregellae.

In 320 BC the consul Quintus Publilius Philo and Lucius Papirius Cursor marched to Apulia. This move threw the Samnites off. Publilius headed for Luceria, where the Roman hostages were held. He routed a Samnite contingent. However, the Samnites regrouped and besieged the Romans outside Luceria. The army of Papirius advanced along the coast as far as Arpi. The people of that area were well disposed towards the Romans because they were fed up with years of Samnite raids. They supplied the besieged Romans with grain. This forced the Samnites to engage Papirius. There was an indecisive battle and Papirius besieged the Samnites who then surrendered and passed under the yoke. Luceria was taken and the Roman hostages were freed.

In 319 BC the consul Quintus Aemilius Barbula seized Ferentium and Quintus Publilius subdued Satricum, which had rebelled and had hosted a Samnite garrison. In 318 BC envoys from Samnite cities went to Rome to "seek a renewal of the treaty." This was turned down, but a two-year truce was granted. The Apulian cities of Teanum and Canusium submitted to Rome and Apulia was now subdued. In 317 BC Quintus Aemilius Barbula took Nerulum in Lucania.

=== Presumed resumption of hostilities ===
==== 316–313 BC – Operations at Saticula, Sora, and Bovianum ====
In 316 BC the dictator Lucius Aemilius besieged Saticula, a Samnite city near the border with Campania. A large Samnite army encamped near the Romans and the Saticulans made a sortie. Aemilius was in a position which was difficult to attack, drove the Saticulans back into the town and then confronted the Samnites, who fled to their camp and left at night. The Samnites then besieged the nearby Plistica, which was an ally of Rome.

In 315 BC the dictator Quintus Fabius Maximus Rullianus took over the operations at Saticula. The Samnites had raised fresh troops, encamped near the city and were trying to force a battle to divert the Romans from the siege. Quintus Fabius concentrated on the city and the Samnites harassed the Roman rampart. The Roman master of the horse Quintus Aulius Cerretanus attacked the Samnites who were harassing the Roman Camp. He killed the Samnite commander and was killed himself. The Samnites left and went on to seize Plistica. The Romans transferred their troops in Apulia and Samnia to deal with Sora, a Roman colony in Latium near the border with Samnia, which had defected to the Samnites and killed the Roman colonists. The Roman army headed for there, but heard that the Samnites were also moving and that they were getting close. The Romans took a diversion and engaged the Samnites at the battle of Lautulae, where they were defeated and their master of the horse, Quintus Aulius, died. He was replaced by Gaius Fabius, who brought a new army and was told to conceal it. Quintus Fabius ordered battle without telling his troops about the new army and simulated a burning of their camp to strengthen their resolve. The soldiers threw the enemy into disarray and Quintus Aulius joined the attack.

In 314 BC the new consuls, Marcus Poetelius and Gaius Sulpicius, took new troops to Sora. The city was in a difficult position to take, but a deserter offered to betray it. He told the Romans to move their camp close to the city and the next night he took ten men on an almost impassable and steep path up to the citadel. He then shouted that the Romans had taken it. The inhabitants panicked and opened the city gates. The conspirators were taken to Rome and executed and a garrison was stationed at Sora. After the Samnite victory at Lautulae three Ausoni cities, Ausona, Minturnae (Ausonia and Minturno) both in Latium, just north of and on the north bank of the river Liris respectively, and Vescia (across the river, in Campania) had sided with the Samnites. Some young nobles from the three cities betrayed them and three Roman detachments were sent. Livy said that "because the leaders were not present when the attack was made, there was no limit to the slaughter, and the Ausonian nation was wiped out." In the same year, Luceria betrayed its Roman garrison to the Samnites. A Roman army which was not far away seized the city. In Rome it was proposed to send 2500 colonists to Luceria. Many voted to destroy the city because of the treachery and, because it was so distant, that many believed that sending colonists there was like sending people into exile, and in hostile territory to boot. However, the colonization proposal was carried. A conspiracy was discovered in Capua and the Samnites decided to try to seize the city. They were confronted by both consuls, Marcus Poetelius Libo and Gaius Sulpicius Longus. The right wing of Poetelius routed its Samnite counterpart. However, Sulpicius, overconfident about a Roman victory, had left his left wing with a contingent to join Poetelius and without him his troops came close to defeat. When he re-joined them, his men prevailed. The Samnites fled to Maleventum, in Samnia.

The two consuls went on to besiege Bovianum, the capital of the Pentri, the largest of the four Samnite tribes, and wintered there. In 313 BC they were replaced by the dictator Gaius Poetelius Libo Visolus. The Samnites took Fregellae and Poetelius moved to retake it, but the Samnites had left at night. He placed a garrison and then marched on Nola (near Naples) to retake it. He set fire to the buildings near the city walls and took the city. Colonies were established at the Volscian island of Pontiae, the Volscian town of Interamna Sucasina and at Suessa Aurunca.

==== 312–308 BC – The Etruscans intervene ====
In 312 BC, while the war in Samnia seemed to be winding down, there were rumours of a mobilisation of the Etruscans, who were more feared than the Samnites. While the consul M. Valerius Maximus Corvus was in Samnia, his colleague Publius Decius Mus, who was sick, appointed Gaius Sulpicius Longus as dictator, who made preparations for war.

In 311 BC the consuls Gaius Junius Bubulcus Brutus and Quintus Aemilius Barbula divided their command. Junius took on Samnia and Aemilius took on Etruria. The Samnites took the Roman garrison of Cluviae (location unknown) and scourged its prisoners. Junius retook it and then moved on Bovianum and sacked it. The Samnites sought to ambush the Romans. Misinformation that there was a large flock of sheep in an inaccessible mountain meadow was planted. Junius headed for it and was ambushed. While the Romans mounted the slope there was little fighting and when they reached level ground at the top and lined up the Samnites panicked and fled. The woods blocked their escape and most were killed. Meanwhile, the Etruscans besieged Sutrium, an ally which the Romans saw as their key to Etruria. Aemilius came to help and the next day the Etruscans offered battle. It was a long and bloody fight. The Romans were starting to gain the upper hand, but darkness stopped the battle. There was no further fighting that year as the Etruscans had lost their first line and only had their reservists left and the Romans had suffered many casualties.

In 310 BC the consul Quintus Fabius Maximus Rullianus went to Sutrium with reinforcements and was met by a superior force of Etruscans who were lined up for battle. He went up the hills and faced the enemy. The Etruscans charged in haste, throwing away their javelins. The Romans pelted them with javelins and stones. This unsettled the Etruscans and their line wavered. The Romans charged, the Etruscans fled and, as they were cut off by the Roman cavalry, they headed for the mountains instead of their camp. From there they went to the impassable Ciminian Forest, which the Romans were so scared of that none of them had ever crossed it. Marcus Fabius, one of the brothers of the consul, who had been educated by family friends in Caere in Etruria and spoke Etruscan, offered to explore the forest, pretending to be an Etruscan shepherd. He went as far as Camerinum in Umbria, where the locals offered supplies and soldiers to the Romans. Quintus Fabius crossed the forest and ravaged the area around the Cimian Mountains. This enraged the Etruscans, who gathered the largest army they had ever raised and marched on Sutrium. They advanced to the Roman rampart, but the Romans refused to engage, so they waited there. To encourage his outnumbered soldiers Quintus Fabius told them that he had a secret weapon and hinted that the Etruscans were being betrayed. At dawn the Romans exited their camp and attacked the sleeping Etruscans, who were routed. Some fled to their camp, but most made for the hills and the forest. The Etruscan cities of Perusia and Cortona and Arretium sued for peace and obtained a thirty-year truce.

Meanwhile, the other consul, Gaius Marcius Rutilus, captured Allifae (in Campania) from the Samnites and destroyed or seized many forts and villages. The Roman fleet was sent to Pompeii in Campania and from there they pillaged the territory of Nuceria. Greedy for booty, the sailors ventured too far inland and on their way back the country folk killed many of them. The Samnites received a report that the Romans had been besieged by the Etruscans and had decided to confront Gaius Marcius. The report also indicated that, if Gaius Marcius avoided battle, the Samnites would march to Etruria via the lands of the Marsi and the Sabines. Gaius Marcius confronted them and a bloody but indecisive battle was fought where the Romans lost several officers and the consul was wounded. The senate appointed Lucius Papirius Cursor as dictator. However, Quintus Fabius had a grudge against Lucius Papirius. A delegation of former consuls was sent to him to persuade him to accept the Senate's decision, and Fabius reluctantly appointed Papirius. Lucius Papirius relieved Gaius Marcius at Longula, a Volscian town near the Samnite border. He marched out to offer battle. The two armies lined up in front of each other until night and there was no fighting. Meanwhile, a fierce battle was fought in Etruria by an unspecified Etruscan army levied (presumably by Etruscans who had not signed the mentioned treaty) by using the lex sacrata (an arrangement with religious connotations whereby the soldiers had to fight to the death). It confronted the Romans at the Battle of Lake Vadimo. The battle was long-drawn-out affair and with many casualties and the reserves were called in. It was finally resolved by the Roman cavalry which dismounted and fought like a fresh line of infantry and managed to break the exhausted ranks of the enemy. Livy said that this battle broke the might of the Etruscans for the first time as the battle cut off their strength.

In 309 BC Lucius Papirius Cursor won a massive battle against the Samnites and celebrated the finest triumph there had been thanks to the spoils. The Etruscan cities broke the truce and Quintus Fabius easily defeated the remnants of their troops near Perusia and would have taken the city had it not surrendered. In 308 BC, Quintus Fabius was elected consul again. His colleague was Publius Decius Mus. Quintus Fabius took on Samnia. He refused peace offers by Nuceria Alfaterna and besieged it into surrender. He also fought an unspecified battle where the Marsi joined the Samnites. The Paeligni, who also sided with the Samnites, were defeated next. In Etruria Decius obtained a forty-year truce and grain supplies from Tarquinii, seized some strongholds of Volsinii and ravaged wide areas. All Etruscans sued for a treaty, but he conceded only a one-year truce and required them to give each Roman soldier one year's pay and two tunics. There was a revolt by Umbrians who, backed by Etruscan men, gathered a large army and said that they would ignore Decius and march on Rome. Decius undertook forced marches, encamped near Pupinia, to the north-east of Rome, and called on Fabius to lead his army to Umbria. Fabius marched to Mevania, near Assisi, where the Umbrian troops were. The Umbrians were surprised as they thought he was in Samnia. Some of them fell back to their cities and some pulled out of the war. Others attacked Fabius while he was entrenching his camp, but they were defeated. The leaders of the revolt surrendered and the rest of Umbria capitulated within days.

==== 307–304 BC – Final campaigns in Apulia and Samnia ====
In 307 BC the consul Lucius Volumnius Flamma Violens was assigned a campaign against the Salentini of southern Apulia, where he seized several hostile towns. Quintus Fabius was elected as proconsul to conduct the campaign in Samnia. He defeated the Samnites in a pitched battle near Allifae and besieged their camp. The Samnites surrendered, passed under the yoke and their allies were sold into slavery. There were some Hernici among the troops and they were sent to Rome where an inquiry was held to determine whether they were conscripts or volunteers. All of the Hernici, except the peoples of the cities of Aletrium, Ferentium and Verulae, declared war on Rome. Quintus Fabius left Samnia, and the Samnites seized Calatia and Sora with their Roman garrisons. In 306 BC the consul Publius Cornelius Arvina headed for Samnia and his colleague Quintus Marcius Tremulus took on the Hernici. The enemies took all the strategic points between the camps and isolated the two consuls. In Rome two armies were enlisted. However, the Hernici did not engage the Romans, lost three camps, sued for a thirty-year truce and then surrendered unconditionally. Meanwhile, the Samnites were harassing Publius Cornelius and blocking his supply routes. Quintus Marcius came to his aid and was attacked. He advanced through the enemy lines and took their camp, which was empty, and burned it. On seeing the fire Publius Cornelius joined in and blocked the escape of the Samnites, who were slaughtered when the two consuls joined their forces. Some Samnite relief troops also attacked, but they were routed and pursued and begged for peace. In 305 BC the Samnites made forays in Campania.

In 305 BC the consuls were sent to Samnia. Lucius Postumius Megellus marched on Tifernum and Titus Minucius Augurinus on Bovianum. There was a battle at Tifernum where some of Livy's sources say that Postumius was defeated, while others say that the battle was even and he withdrew to the mountains at night. The Samnites followed him and encamped near him. Livy said that he seemed to have wanted to gain a position where he could get abundant supplies. Postumius then left a garrison at this camp and marched to his colleague who was also encamped facing the enemy. He instigated Titus Minucius to give battle, which dragged on until the late afternoon. Then Postumius joined in and the Samnites were slaughtered. The next day the consuls began the siege of Bovianum, which fell quickly. In 304 BC the Samnites sent envoys to Rome to negotiate a peace. The suspicious Romans sent the consul Publius Sempronius Sophus to Samnia with an army to investigate the true intentions of the Samnites. He travelled all over Samnia and everywhere he found peaceable people who gave him supplies. Livy said that the ancient treaty with the Samnites was restored. He did not specify what the terms were.

=== Aftermath ===
After the defeat of the Hernici in 306 BC, Roman citizenship without the right to vote was imposed on this people, effectively annexing their territory. In 304 BC, after the peace treaty, Rome sent the fetials to ask for reparation from the Aequi of the mountains by Latium, who had repeatedly joined the Hernici in helping the Samnites and after the defeat of the former, they went over to the enemy. The Aequi claimed that Rome was trying to impose Roman citizenship on them. They said to the Roman assemblies that the thrusting of Roman citizenship on them amounted to loss of independence and was a punishment. This led to the Roman people voting for war on the Aequi. Both consuls were entrusted with this war. The Aequi levied a militia, but this did not have a clear commander. There was disagreement over whether to offer battle or defend their camp. Concerns about the destruction of the farms and the poor fortification of the towns led to the decision to disperse to defend the towns. The Romans found the Aequi camp deserted. They then took the Aequi towns by storm and most were burnt. Livy wrote that "the Aequian name was almost blotted out." Still, in 304 BC, the Sabellian peoples of modern northern Abruzzo, the Marsi and Marucini (on the Adriatic coast), as well as the latter's Oscan neighbours, the Paeligni and the Frentani (Oscans who lived in the southern coast of Abruzzo and the coastal part of modern Molise), stipulated treaties with Rome.

In 303 BC the Sabine town of Trefula Suffrenas (Ciciliano) and the Volscian town of Arpinium (Arpino) in southern Latium were given citizenship without the right to vote (civitas sine suffragio). Frusino (Frosinone), also a Volscian town in southern Latium, was deprived of two thirds of its land because it had conspired with the Hernici and its ringleaders were executed. Colonies were established at Alba Fucens in the land of the Aequi and Sora, in Volscian territory which had been taken by the Samnites, with 6000 settlers sent to the former and 4000 to the latter. In 302 BC the Aequi attacked Alba Fucens, but were defeated by the colonists. Gaius Junius Bubulcus Brutus was appointed as dictator. He reduced them to submission in one battle. In the same year the Vestini (Oscans who lived on Adriatic coast of modern Abruzzo) established an alliance with Rome. In 301 BC the Marsi resisted land being confiscated for the establishment of the colony of Carsoli (or Carseoli, modern Carsoli) with 4000 colonists, even through it was in Aequi territory. Marcus Valerius Corvus Calenus was appointed as dictator. He defeated the Marsi, seized Milionia, Plestina, and Fresilia and renewed the treaty with them. In 300 BC two Roman tribes (administrative districts), the Aniensis and the Terentina were added. In 299 BC the Romans besieged and seized Nequinum in Umbria and established the colony of Narnia.

The annexation of Trebula Suffenas provided a degree of control over the Sabines who lived close to Rome. With the annexation of Arpinium and most of the land of Frusino and the founding of the colony at Sora the Romans consolidated control over southern Latium and the Volsci. Control over the stretch of the Apennine Mountains next to Latium was consolidated with the annexation of the Hernici, the destruction of the towns of the Aequi, the founding of two colonies in their territory (Alba Fucens and Caseoli) and the creation of the Aniensis Roman tribe on land taken from the Aequi. Control over Campania was consolidated with the renewal of friendship with Naples, with the destruction of the Ausoni, and the creation of the Teretina Roman tribe on land which had been annexed from the Aurunci in 314 BC.

The alliances with the Marsi, Maruccini, Paelingni, Frentani (in 304 BC), and Vestini (in 302 BC), who lived to the north and north-east of Samnia, not only gave Rome control over this substantial area around Samnia, but it also strengthened its military position. The alliances were military and the allies supplied soldiers who supported the Roman legions at their own expense, thus increasing the pool of military manpower available to Rome. In exchange the allies shared the spoils of war (which could be considerable) and were protected by Rome.

However, Rome's dominance over central Italy and part of southern Italy was not fully established yet. Etruria and Umbria were not quite pacified. There were two expeditions to Umbria; there were wars with the Etruscans in 301 BC and in 298 BC. The latter was the year the Third Samnite War broke out. The second war accelerated the process of Roman expansion and the third war established Rome's dominance of the areas concerned.

== Third Samnite War (298 to 290 BC) ==
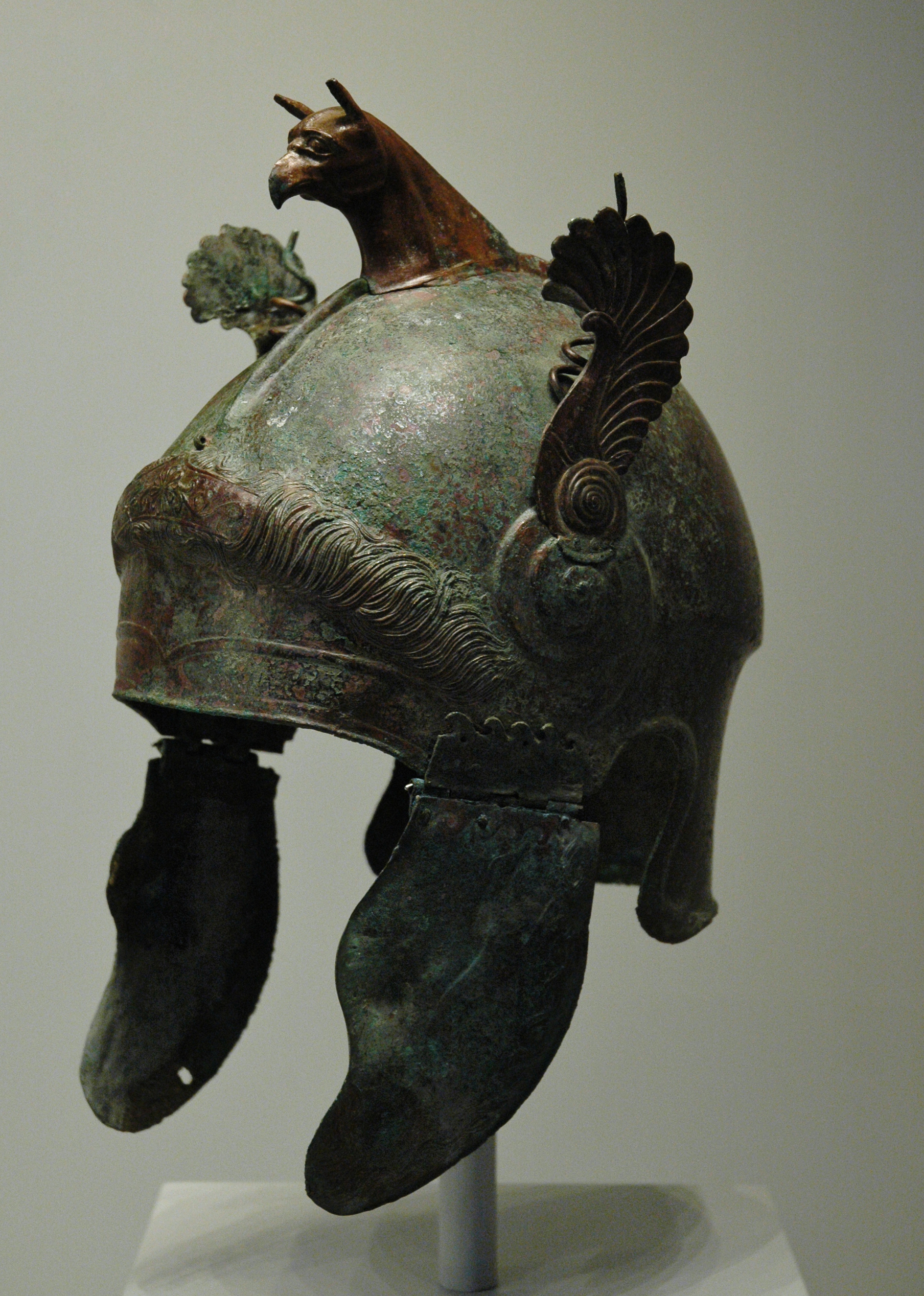
A ceremonial Attic helmet typical of many found in Samnite tombs, c. 300 BC

=== Outbreak ===
In 299 BC, the Etruscans, possibly due to the Roman colony set up at Narnia in next-door Umbria, prepared for war against Rome. However, the Gauls invaded their territory, so, the Etruscans offered them money to form an alliance. The Gauls agreed, but then objected to fighting against Rome, claiming that the agreement was only about them not devastating Etruscan territory. So, instead, the Etruscans paid the Gauls off and dismissed them. This incident led the Romans to ally with the Picentes (who lived on the Adriatic coast, in the south of modern Marche) who were concerned about their neighbours, the Senone Gauls to the north, and the Pretutii to the south. The latter had allied with the Samnites. The Romans sent an army to Etruria led by the consul Titus Manlius Torquatus, who died in a riding accident. The Etruscans saw this as an omen for war. However, the Romans elected Marcus Valerius Corvus Calenus as suffect consul (an office which lasted for the remainder of the term of a deceased or removed consul) and he was sent to Etruria. This led the Etruscans to remain in their fortifications, refusing battle even though the Romans ravaged their land. Meanwhile, the Picentes warned the Romans that the Samnites were preparing for war and that they had asked them for help.

Early in 298 BC a Lucanian delegation went to Rome to ask the Romans to take them under their protection as the Samnites, having failed to bring them into an alliance, had invaded their territory. Rome agreed to an alliance. Fetials were sent to Samnia to order the Samnites to leave Lucania. The Samnites threatened their safety and Rome declared war. Dionysius of Halicarnassus thought that the cause of the war was not Roman compassion for the wronged, but fear of the strength the Samnites would gain if they subdued the Lucanians. Oakley suggests that Rome might well have deliberately sought a new war with Samnia by allying with her enemies.

=== War ===
==== 298 BC: Conflicting Accounts ====
According to Livy, the consul Lucius Cornelius Scipio Barbatus was assigned Etruria and his colleague Gnaeus Fulvius Maximus Centumalus was given the Samnites. Barbatus was engaged in a battle near Volterrae (in northern Etruria) which was interrupted by sunset. The Etruscans retreated during the night. Barbatus marched to the Faliscan district and laid Etruscan territory north of the Tiber to waste. Gnaeus Fulvius won in Samnia and seized Bovianum, and Aufidena. However, an epitaph on the sarcophagus of Cornelius Scipio says that he ‘was consul, censor and aedile ...[and]... He captured Taurasia and Cisauna in Samnia; he subdued all Lucania and brought back hostages.’ Cornell says that the original inscription was erased and replaced by the extant one probably around 200 BC, and notes that this "was the period when the first histories of Rome were being written, which is not a coincidence.".

In addition to having Barbatus fighting in Samnia the inscription records him as taking Taurasia (probably in the Tammaro valley in the modern province of Benevento) and Cisauna (unknown location), rather than Bovianum and Aufidena. There is the further complication by the Fasti Triumphales (a record of Roman triumphal celebrations), recording Gnaeus Fulvius’ triumphs against both the Samnites and the Etruscans. Forsythe points out that the consulship is the only public office Barbatus is mentioned as having held which gave him command of a legion. Modern historians have proposed various alternative scenarios wherein one or both of the consuls campaigned against both the Samnites and Etruscans, but without satisfactory conclusions. Cornell says that such an assumption could reconcile the sources, but "if so, neither Livy nor the inscription would emerge with much credit. Once again the evidence seems to show that there was a great deal of confusion in the tradition about the distribution of consular commands in the Samnite Wars, and that many different versions proliferated in the Late Republic." His conclusion is that "no satisfactory resolution to this puzzle is possible".

Regarding the submission of Lucania and the bringing back of hostages, Livy said that the Lucanians were willing to give hostages as a pledge of good faith. Cornell remarks that "[t]he intimation of that the Lucanians’ submission was the result of military action is a good example of how events could be improved in the telling." Forsythe points out that Livy noted that in 296 BC the Romans suppressed plebeian disturbances in Lucania on the behest of the Lucanian aristocracy. He argues that this suggests divisions in Lucania over the alliance with Rome and that, if this was also the case in 298 BC, Barbatus might have gone to Lucania to quell any possible local resistance to the alliance as well as to prevent Samnite raids and to collect the agreed hostages. Forsythe also notes that Barbatus’ campaign in Etruria could be explained in three ways: 1) it could be fictive; 2) Barbatus could have campaigned in both Samnia and Etruria; 3) Barbatus participated in the campaigns linked to the front which led to the Battle of Sentinum in 295 BC, and that this may have included operations in Etruria in that year, but it might have been attributed by later historians to his consulship in 298 BC. As for the claim that Barbatus subdued all of Lucania, Forsythe suggests that this is "perhaps part truth and part a Roman aristocratic exaggeration."

Oakley also points to two more problems with the sources. In Livy's account, Bovianum, the capital of the Pentri, the largest of the four Samnite tribes, was captured in the first year of the war, which seems unlikely. Frontinus records three stratagems employed by one "Fulvius Nobilior" while fighting against the Samnites in Lucania. The cognomen Nobilior is not otherwise recorded before 255 BC, forty-five years after the end of the Samnite Wars. A plausible explanation is therefore that Nobilior is a mistake and the stratagems should be attributed to the consul of 298 BC.

==== 297 BC: Rome turns to Samnia ====
The elections of the consuls for 297 BC took place amid rumours that the Etruscans and the Samnites were raising huge armies. The Romans turned to Quintus Fabius Maximus Rullianus, Rome's most experienced military commander, who was not a candidate for election and refused the proposal. He then relented on condition that Publius Decius Mus, who had been consul with him in 308 BC, would be elected as his colleague. It is impossible to establish whether Livy had any evidence for the existence of these rumours, or if they are just conjecture by him or his sources.

Livy is the only source for the events of 297 BC. He wrote that envoys from Sutrium, Nepete (Romans colonies) and Falerii in southern Etruria arrived in Rome with news that the Etruscan city-states were discussing suing for peace. This freed both consuls, who marched on Samnia, Quintus Fabius by way of Sora and Publius Decius through the land of the Sidicini. A Samnite army had prepared to confront them in a valley near Tifernum, but it was defeated by Quintus Fabius. Meanwhile, Publius Decius had camped at Maleventum where an Apulian army would have joined the Samnites in the battle against Quintus Fabius had Publius Decius not defeated it. The two consuls then spent four months ravaging Samnia. Fabius also seized Cimetra (location unknown). There are no major problems with Livy's account, but no parallel sources survive to confirm it either. Fabius' route via Sora to Tifernum is convoluted, but not insurmountable. The appearance of an Apulian army at Maleventum is surprising since nothing is known of Apulian hostility to Rome since the conclusion of peace in 312 BC. However the Apulians might have been divided in their alliance with Rome or have been provoked to war by the campaign of Barbatus the previous year. Publius Decius' campaign fits within the larger pattern of Roman warfare in south-eastern Italy; he might even have wintered in Apulia. No triumphs are recorded in this year for either of the consuls, hence they are unlikely to have had any victories of great significance or made any deep inroads into Samnia.

==== 296 BC: Etruscan intervention ====
The consuls for 296 BC were Appius Claudius Caecus and Lucius Volumnius Flamma Violens. The previous consuls were given a six-month extension of their command as proconsuls to carry on the war in Samnia. Publius Decius ravaged Samnia until he drove the Samnite army outside its territory. This army went to Etruria to back up previous calls for an alliance, which had been turned down, with intimidation and insisted on the Etruscan council being convened. The Samnites pointed out that they could not defeat Rome by themselves, but an army of all the Etruscans, the richest nation in Italy, backed up by the Samnite army could. Meanwhile, Publius Decius decided to switch from ravaging the countryside to attacking cities as the Samnite army was away. He seized Murgantia, a strong city, and Romulea. After that he marched to Ferentium, which was in southern Etruria. Livy pointed out some discrepancies between his sources, noting that some annalists said that Romulea and Ferentium were taken by Quintus Fabius and that Publius Decius took only Murgantia, while others said that the towns were taken by the consuls of the year, and others still gave all the credit to Lucius Volumnius who, they said, had sole command in Samnia.

Meanwhile, in Etruria Gellius Egnatius, a Samnite commander, was organising a campaign against Rome. Almost all the Etruscan city-states voted for war, the nearest Umbrian tribes joined in and there were attempts to hire Gauls as auxiliaries. News of this reached Rome and Appius Claudius set off for Etruria with two legions and 15,000 allied troops. Lucius Volumnius had already left for Samnia with two legions and 12,000 allies. This is the first time Livy gives details about the Roman forces and figures for the allied troops for the Samnite wars. It is also the first time that we hear of the consuls commanding two legions each. Including the forces of the proconsuls, in this year the Romans must have mobilised six legions.

Appius Claudius suffered a number of setbacks and lost the confidence of his troops. Lucius Volumnius, who had taken three fortifications in Samnia, sent Quintus Fabius to suppress disturbances by the plebeians in Lucania, left the ravaging of rural Samnia to Publius Decius and went to Etruria. Livy notes that some annalists said that Appius Claudius had written him a letter to summon him from Samnia and that this became a subject of dispute between the two consuls, with the former denying it and the latter insisting that he had been summoned by the former. Livy thought that Appius Claudius did not write the letter, but said that he wanted to send his colleague back to Samnia and felt that he ungratefully denied his need for help. However, the soldiers begged him to stay. A dispute between the two men ensued, but the soldiers insisted that both consuls fight in Etruria. The Etruscans faced Lucius Volumnius and the Samnites advanced on Appius Claudius. Livy said that "the enemy could not withstand a force so much greater than they were accustomed to meet." They were routed; 7,900 were killed and 2,010 were captured.

Lucius Volumnius hurried back to Samnia because the proconsulships of Quintus Fabius and Publius Decius were about to expire. Meanwhile, the Samnites raised new troops and raided Roman territories and allies in Campania around Capua and Falernium. Lucius Volumnius headed for Campania and was informed that the Samnites had gone back to Samnia to take their loot. He caught up with their camp and defeated a force which was made unfit to fight by the burden of their loot. The Samnite commander, Staius Minatius, was attacked by the prisoners of the Samnites and delivered to the consul. The senate decided to establish the colonies of Minturnae on the mouth of the River Liris and Sinuessa further inland, in the former territory of the Ausoni.

==== 295 BC: The Etrurian Campaign and the Battle of Sentinum ====
The Samnite raids in Campania created great alarm in Rome. In addition to this, there was news that, following the withdrawal of Lucius Volumnius' army from Etruria, the Etruscans were arming themselves, had invited Gellius Egnatius' Samnites and the Umbrians to join them in revolt, and had offered large sums of money to the Gauls. Then there were reports of an actual coalition between these four peoples and that there was "a huge army of Gauls." It was the first time that Rome had to confront a coalition of four peoples. There was going to be the biggest war Rome had ever faced and the two best military commanders, Quintus Fabius Maximus Rullianus and Publius Decius Mus were elected as consuls again (for 295 BC). Lucius Volumnius' command was prolonged for a year. Quintus Fabius went to Etruria with one legion to replace Appius Claudius and left this legion in Clusium, too. He then went to Rome where the war was being debated. It was decided that the two consuls both fight in Etruria. They set off with four legions, a large cavalry and 1,000 Campanian soldiers. The allies fielded an even larger army. Lucius Volumnius went to Samnia with two legions. That he went with such a large force must have been part of a diversionary strategy to force the Samnites to respond to Roman raids in Samnia and limit their troop deployment in Etruria. Two reserve contingents headed by propraetors were stationed in the Faliscan district and near the Vatican Hill respectively to protect Rome.

Livy reported two traditions about events in Etruria early in 295 BC. According to one, before the consuls went to Etruria, a large force of Senones went to Clusium to attack the Roman legion stationed there and routed it. There were no survivors to warn the consuls who were unaware of the disaster until they came across Gallic horsemen. According to the other one, Umbrians attacked a Roman foraging party which was relieved by assistance from the Roman camp.

The Etruscans, Samnites and Umbrians crossed the Apennine Mountains and advanced near Sentinum (in the Marche region, near modern Sassoferrato). Their plan was for the Samnites and Senones to engage the Romans and for the Etruscans and Umbrians to take the Roman camp during the battle. Deserters from Clusium informed Quintus Fabius about this plan. The consul ordered the legions in Falerii and the Vatican to march to Clusium and ravage its territory for another diversionary strategy. It drew the Etruscans away from Sentinium to defend their land. In the Battle of Sentinum, the Gauls stood on the right wing and the Samnites on the left. Quintus Fabius stood on the right and Publius Decius on the left. Livy said that the two forces were so evenly matched that if the Etruscans and Umbrians had been present it would have been a disaster for the Romans.

Quintus Fabius fought defensively to prolong the battle into a test of endurance and wait for the enemy to flag. Publius Decius fought more aggressively and ordered a cavalry attack, which drove back the Senone cavalry twice. The second time they reached the enemy infantry, but suffered a chariot attack and were scattered and overthrown. The line of the Decius’ infantry was broken by the chariots and the Senone foot attacked. Publius Decius decided to devote himself. This term referred to a military commander offering prayers to the gods and launching himself into the enemy lines, effectively sacrificing himself, when his troops were in dire straits. This act galvanised the Roman left which was also joined by two reserve contingents which Quintus Fabius had called in to help. On the right, Quintus Fabius told the cavalry to outflank the Samnite wing and attack it in the flank and ordered his infantry to push forward. He then called in the other reserves. The Samnites fled past the Senone line. The Senones formed a testudo (tortoise) formation – where the men aligned their shields in a compact formation covered with shields at the front and top. Quintus Fabius ordered 500 Campanian lancers to attack them at the rear. This was to be combined with push by the middle line of one of the legions and an attack by the cavalry. Meanwhile, Quintus Fabius took the Samnite camp by storm and cut off the Senones in the rear. The Senone Gauls were defeated. The Romans lost 8,700 men and their enemy 20,000.

Livy noted that some writers (whose works are lost) exaggerated the size of the battle, saying that the Umbrians also took part and gave the enemy an infantry of 60,000 a cavalry of 40,000 and 1,000 chariots and claiming that Lucius Volumnius and his two legions also fought in the battle. Livy said that Lucius Volumnius, instead, was holding the front in Samnia and routed a Samnite force near Mount Tifernus. After the battle, 5,000 Samnites made their way back home from Sentinum through the land of the Paeligni. The locals attacked them and killed 1,000 men. In Etruria, the propraetor Gnaeus Fulvius defeated the Etruscans. Perusia and Clusium lost up to 3,000 men. Quintus Fabius left Publius Decius’ army to guard Etruria and went to Rome to celebrate a triumph. In Etruria Perusia continued the war. Appius Claudius was sent to head Publius Decius's army as propraetor and Quintus Fabius confronted and defeated the Perusini. The Samnites attacked the areas around the River Liris (at Formiae and Vescia), and the River Volturnus. They were pursued by Appius Claudius and Lucius Volumnius, who merged their forces and defeated the Samnites in the vicinity of Caiatia, near Capua.

==== 294 BC: Samnite Raids ====
In 294 BC, the Samnites raided three Roman armies (one was meant to return to Etruria, one to defend the border and the third to raid Campania). The consul Marcus Atilius Regulus was sent to the front and met the Samnites in a position where neither force could raid enemy territory. The Samnites attacked the Roman camp under the cover of fog, taking part of the camp and killing many men and several officers. The Romans managed to repel them but did not pursue them because of the fog. The other consul, Lucius Postumius Megellus, who was recovering from illness, assembled an army of allies at Sora, where Roman foragers had been pushed back by the Samnites, and the Samnites retreated. Lucius Postumius went on to take Milionia and Feritrum, two unidentified Samnite towns.

Marcus Atilius marched on Luceria (in Apulia), which was being besieged, and was defeated. The next day there was another battle. The Roman infantry began to flee, but was forced back into battle by their cavalry. The Samnites did not press their advantage and were then defeated. On his way back, Marcus Atilius defeated a Samnite force which was trying to seize Interamna, a Roman colony on the River Liris. The other consul, Lucius Postumius, moved from Samnia to Etruria without consulting the senate. He ravaged the territory of Volsinii and defeated the townsfolk who had come out of the city to defend it. Volsinii, Perusia and Arretium sued for peace and obtained a forty-year truce. Livy mentioned that there were sources with different stories. In one, it was Marcus Atilius who went to Etruria and got a triumph. Lucius Postumius, instead, seized some cities in Samnia and then was defeated and wounded in Apulia and took refuge in Luceria. In another, both consuls fought in Samnia and at Luceria, with both sides suffering heavy losses.

==== 293 BC-290 BC: Defeat of Samnia ====
In 293 BC, fresh troops were levied throughout Samnia. Forty thousand men met in Aquilonia. The consul Spurius Carvilius Maximus took on veteran legions which Marcus Atilius had left at Interamna Lirenas in the middle Liris valley and went on to seize Amiternum in Samnia (not to be confused with Amiternum in Sabina). The other consul, Lucius Papirius Cursor (the son of the Lucius Papirius of the Second Samnite War), levied a new army and took Duronia by storm. The two consuls then went where the main Samnite forces were stationed. Spurius Carvilius went to Cominium and engaged in skirmishes. Lucius Papirius besieged Aquilonia. Both towns were in north-western Samnia. The consuls decided to attack both at the same time. Lucius Papirius was informed by a deserter that twenty contingents of 400 men each of the Samnite elite forces which, in desperation, had been recruited under the lex sacrata (in which soldiers swore not to flee the battle under pain of death) were heading for Cominium. He informed his colleague and then set out to intercept them with part of his forces, defeating them. Meanwhile, the other part of his forces attacked Aquilonia. Lucius Pairius re-joined them and the city was taken. Meanwhile, at Cominium, when Spurius Carvilius heard about the twenty elite Samnite contingents (not knowing about their defeat by his colleague), he sent a legion and some auxiliaries to keep them at bay and went ahead with his planned attack on the city, which eventually surrendered. Forsythe writes that the Battle of Aquilonia "was the last great battle of the war, and it sealed the fate of the Samnites."

With the Samnite armies destroyed, the consuls decided to storm towns. Spurius Carvilius took Velia, Palumbinum and Herculaneum (locations unknown). Lucius Papirius took Saepinum (modern Altilia), one of Samnia's main towns. Meanwhile, the Etruscans attacked Roman allies and the Faliscans defected to the Etruscans. With the winter setting in and the snow falling, the Romans withdrew from Samnia. Lucius Papirius went to Rome for his triumph and then went to Vescia (in Campania) to winter and to protect the locals from Samnite raids. Spurius Carvilius went to Etruria. He seized Troilum (location unknown) and took five fortresses by storm. The Faliscans sued for peace and were fined heavily and granted a one-year truce.

Livy's narrative of the Third Samnite War ends here, with the end of Book 10. Books 11–20 have been lost. For Book 11 we only have a brief summary which is part of the Periochae, a summary of his 142 books (except for 136 and 137). There is mention of the consul Quintus Fabius Maximus Gurges being defeated in Samnia and being spared a recall from the army and humiliation by the intervention of his father, Quintus Fabius Maximus Rullianus, who promised to help him as deputy. The two men defeated the Samnites and captured Gaius Pontius, the Samnite commander, who was paraded in the triumph and beheaded. Gurges had moved against the Caudini and according to Eutropius his army was nearly destroyed and lost 3,000 men. Salmon thinks that this setback was probably an exaggeration because the next year Gurges was appointed proconsul and he was consul again in 276 BC, during the Pyrrhic War. He thinks that his subsequent victory was also magnified and is a fictitious anticipation of the father and son partnership between Quintus Fabius Maximus Cunctator and his son during the Second Punic War.

In 291 BC Quintus Fabius Maximus Gurges, as proconsul, defeated the Pentri, the largest Samnite tribe, and took their stronghold of Cominium Ocritum. The consul Lucius Postimius Megellus operating from Apulia attacked the Hirpini tribe of the Samnites and seized their large town of Venusia. Because its location offered control over Lucania and Apulia as well as Samnia the Romans founded the largest colony they ever established. Dionysius of Halicarnassus gave a figure of 20,000 colonists, which is impossibly high. Details for 290 BC are scant, but the little surviving information suggests that the consuls Manius Curius Dentatus and Publius Cornelius Rufinus campaigned to mop up the last pockets of resistance throughout Samnia and according to Eutropius this involved some large scale fighting.

=== Aftermath ===
When the Samnite War ended, the Romans moved to crush the Sabines who lived on the mountains to the east of Rome. Manius Curius Dentatus pushed deep into the Sabine territory between the rivers Nar (today's Nera, the main tributary of the River Tiber) and Anio (Aniene, another tributary of the Tiber) and the source of the River Avens (Velino). Spurius Carvilius confiscated large tracts of land in the plain around Reate (today's Rieti) and Amiternum (11 km from L’ Aquila), which he distributed to Roman settlers. Florus did not give the reasons for this campaign. Salmon speculates that "it might have been because of the part they had played or failed to play in the events of 296/295 [BC]." They let the Samnites cross their territory to go to Etruria. Forsythe also speculated that it may have been a punishment for this. Livy mentioned that Dentatus subdued the rebellious Sabines. The Sabines were given citizenship without the right to vote (civitas sine suffragio), which meant that their territory was effectively annexed to the Roman Republic. Reate and Amiternum were given full Roman citizenship (civitas optimo iure) in 268 BC.

Cornell notes that Rome also conquered the Praetutii. They lived to the east of the Sabines, on the Adriatic coast and were at odds with the Picentes, who were Roman allies. With these two conquests the Roman territory extended into the Apennines area next to her and a strip of it stretched to the Adriatic Sea. This, combined with the mentioned alliances struck after the Second Samnite War with the Marsi, Marrucini, and Paeligni (304 BC) and the Vestini (302 BC), gave Rome control of this part of central Italy. The Samnites were forced to become allies of Rome which must have been on unequal terms. Rome offered a friendship treaty (foedus amicitiae) to those who allied with her voluntarily, but not to those who became allies as a result of defeat. The Romans also established a colony at Venusia, an important strategic point in south-eastern Samnia. The Lucanians retained their alliance with Rome. The result of the Samnite Wars was that Rome became the great power of Italy and controlled a large portion of it.

The alliances which developed after the Latin war, after the Second Samnite War, and at the beginning and the end of the third war laid the foundation for Rome to become the great power in the Mediterranean which defeated Pyrrhus and the Carthaginians and expanded into the Eastern Mediterranean. All the alliance treaties provided that the allies had to provide troops for Rome's wars at their expense. The system worked because Rome supported the ruling elites of the allied peoples, who could turn to her in case of local troubles, and Rome shared the spoils of war, which could be considerable, with her allies. The allies also gained security, protection (Rome fought wars to defend their allies) and a share in the profits of conquest. The participation of allied troops had already become important in the Battle of Sentinum of the Third Samnite War. The Romans came to rely on the allies and their troops often greatly outnumbered those of the Romans. Polybius wrote that for the massive battle of Telamon against the Gauls in 225 BC, the Romans deployed about 41,000 Roman troops and 210,000 allied troops. It can also be deduced that the pool of Roman military manpower was about 40% of the total Roman and Italian pool, which Polybius estimated at 700,000. These were massive numbers which could not be matched by anyone else in the Mediterranean.

In 283 BC there was further Roman consolidation in Italy. There were clashes with the Gauls and the Etruscans. The sources lack detail and can be confused. According to Polybius in 283 BC unspecified Gauls besieged Arretium and defeated a Roman force which had come to the aid of the city. The praetor Lucius Caecilius Metellus Denter died in the battle and was replaced by Manius Curius Dentatus. Dentatus sent envoys to negotiate the release of Roman prisoners, but they were killed. The Romans marched on Gaul (Polybius used this very vague term and must have meant Cisalpine Gaul) and they were met by the Senones who were defeated in a pitched battle. It can be assumed that this clash occurred in the ager Gallicus (the name the Romans gave to the area which had been conquered by the Senones), on the Adriatic coast (in modern Marche) as Polybius wrote that "the Romans invaded the territory of the Senones, killed most of them and drove the rest out of the country and founded the colony of Sena Gallia (Senigalia). Polybius also wrote that "[h]ereupon the Boii, seeing the Senones expelled from their territory, and fearing a like fate for themselves and their own land, implored the aid of the Etruscans and marched out in full force. The united armies gave battle to the Romans near Lake Vadimon, and in this battle most of the Etruscans were cut to pieces while only quite a few of the Boii escaped." He added that the next year the Boii and the Etruscans engaged the Romans in battle again and "were utterly defeated and it was only now that their courage at length gave way and that they sent an embassy to sue for terms and made a treaty with the Romans." Through these clashes the Romans gained further territory along the Adriatic coast, eliminated danger from the Senones and half a century without major conflicts with the Gauls followed. Polybius thought that Rome gained two advantages from these battles: she got used to defeating the Gauls, whom they had feared since the Gallic sack of Rome of 390 BC, and her troops became battle-hardened just before they had to confront Pyrrhus in the Pyrrhic War of 280–275 BC. In Etruria there were victorious clashes with Vulsci and Volsinii in 280 BC and Caere in 273 BC and the destruction of Volsinii in 264 BC.

== Chronology ==
First Samnite War (344 to 341 BC)

- 343 BC – Start of the First Samnite War.
- 342 BC – Battle of Mount Gaurus.
- 341 BC – Rome withdraws from the conflict with the Samnites and enters the Latin War on the side of the Samnites.

Second (or Great) Samnite War (326 to 304 BC)

- 327 BC – The Samnites declared war.
- 327 BC – Start of the Roman siege of Neapolis.
- 326 BC – Capture of Neapolis (Naples).
- 325 BC – Land of the Vestini ravaged and two of their towns seized by Romans because they had allied with the Samnites.
- 324 BC – Samnites defeated and sued for peace, but granted only a one-year truce.
- 324 BC – First Roman operations in Daunia, northern Apulia.
- 321 BC – Roman humiliation at the Caudine Forks.
- 320 BC – Destruction of Fregellae by the Samnites.
- 320 BC – Romans seized Luceria and freed the Romans hostages.
- 319 BC – Romans subdued Satricum, which had rebelled and hosted a Samnite garrison.
- 318 BC – Samnites sought peace. Rome turned this down.
- 318 BC – The Apulian the cities of Teanum and Canusium submitted to Rome.
- 317 BC – Romans seized Nerulum in Lucania.
- 316 BC – Roman besieged Saticula.
- 316 BC – Samnites besieged Plistica.
- 315 BC – Samnites seized Plistica.
- 315 BC – Battle of Lautulae, Roman defeat
- 313 BC – Romans seized Nola.
- 314 BC – Romans destroyed the Ausoni cities of Ausona, Minturnae and Vescia.
- 314 BC – Romans defeated Samnites near Capua.
- 314 BC – Romans seized Sora.
- 313 BC – Romans established colonies at Suessa Aurunca, Interamna Sucasina and the island of Pontiae.
- 313 BC – Samnites seized Roman garrison at Cluvius, Romans retook it.
- 313 BC – Romans sacked Bovianum.
- 311 BC – Romans defeated Samnites at unspecified location in Samnia.
- 311 BC – Beginning of war in Etruria, Etruscans besieged Sutrium, indecisive battle with Romans.
- 311 BC – Romans defeated Etruscans near Sutrium.
- 311 BC – Marcus Fabius' expedition through the Cimian Forest.
- 310 BC – Romans defeat Etruscans at unspecified location.
- 310 BC – The Etruscan cities of Perusia and Cortona and Arretium sued for peace and obtained a thirty-year truce.
- 310 BC – Battle of Lake Vadimo – Roman victory, the battle was said to have broken the might of the Etruscans for the first time.
- 310 BC – Samnites fought the consul Gaius Marcius at unspecified location, indecisive battle, Romans lost several officers, consul wounded.
- 309 BC – Etruscans broke the truce, Romans defeated them near Perusia.
- 309 BC – Rome refused peace offers by Nuceria Alfaterna and seized it.
- 309 BC – Romans defeated Marsi and Paeligni who had allied with Samnites in separate battles at unspecified locations.
- 309 BC – Etruscans sued for peace, Rome only granted a one-year truce.
- 306 BC – Romans fought campaign against Salentini of southern Apulia and seized several towns
- 306 BC – Samnites defeated near Allifae, some Hernici troops found among the enemy ranks, Rome investigated this, Hernici revolt.
- 305 BC – Samnites and Hernici isolated one of the Roman consul each, Hernici surrendered, Samnites defeated.
- 305 BC – Battle at Tifenum in Samnia, according to one source Romans defeated, according to another, they withdrew.
- 305 BC – Romans defeated Samnites at unspecified location in Samnia.
- 305 BC – Romans besieged Bovianum.
- 304 BC – Samnites sued for peace, end of the war.

Third Samnite War (298 to 290 BC)

- 298 BC – Start of the Third Samnite War.
- 298 BC – Battle of Volterrae.
- 298 BC – The Romans capture the Samnite cities of Bovianum and Aufidena and/or, according to a dubious inscription, Taurasia and Cisauna.
- 297 BC – Quintus Fabius Maximus Rullianus defeats the Samnites near Tifernum.
- 296 BC – Publius Decius Mus seized Murgantia, Romulea and Ferentium.
- 295 BC – Battle of Sentinum.
- 294 BC – The Samintes nearly seized a Roman camp in an unspecified location but are repelled.
- 294 BC – Lucius Postumius seized Milionia and Feritrum, two unidentified Samnite towns and defeated Volsini in Etruria.
- 294 BC – Marcus Atilius was defeated at Luceria, but won another battle the next day. He then defeated Samnites who were trying to seize Interamna.
- 293 BC – Lucius Papirius seized Aquilonia and Saepinum in Samnia.
- 293 BC – Spurius Carvilius seized Cominium, Velia, Palumbinum and Herculaneum in Samnia.
- 293 BC – Spurius Carvilius seized Troilum and five fortresses in Etruria.
- 292 BC – Quintus Fabius Maximus Gurges defeated by Caudine Samnites, then defeated them with the help of his father Quintus Fabius Maximus Rullianus.
- 291 BC – Quintus Fabius Maximus Gurges seized Cominium Ocritum, a stronghold of the Pentri Samnites.
- 291 BC – Lucius Postimius Megellus seized Venusia, the chief town of the Hirpini Samnites.
- 290 BC – Roman operations to mop up last pockets of Samnite resistance; end of the war.

== Bibliography ==
Primary sources

Dionysus of Halicarnassus, Roman Antiquities, Aeterna Press, 2015, ISBN 978-1785165498

Diodorus Siculus I: The Historical Library in Forty Books: Volume I, Sophron; 1 edition, 2014, ISBN 978-0989783620

Eutropius, Abridgment of Roman History, CreateSpace Independent Publishing Platform, 2014, ISBN 978-1499683073

Frontinus, Stratagems and Aqueducts of Rome (Loeb Classical Library), Loeb, 1989, ISBN 978-0674991927

Livy, Rome's Italian Wars: Books 6–10 (Oxford's World's Classics). Oxford University Press, 2013, ISBN 978-0199564859

Secondary sources

- Cornell, TJ (1995), The Beginnings of Rome – Italy and Rome from the Bronze Age to the Punic Wars (c. 1000–264 BC), New York: Routledge, 1995, ISBN 978-0-415-01596-7
- Ross Cowan, Roman Conquests: Italy, Barnsley, 2009.
- Forsythe, Gary (2005), A Critical History of Early Rome, Berkeley: University of California Press, ISBN 0-520-24991-7
- Lukas Grossmann: Roms Samnitenkriege. Historische und historiographische Untersuchungen zu den Jahren 327 bis 290 v. Chr., Düsseldorf 2009.
- Oakley, SP (1998), A Commentary on Livy Books VI–X, vol. II: Books VII–VIII, Oxford: Oxford University Press, ISBN 978-0-19-815226-2
- Oakley, SP (2008), A Commentary on Livy Books VI–X, vol. IV: Book X, Oxford University Press, ISBN 978-0-19-923785-2
- Salmon, ET (1967), Samnium and the Samnites, Cambridge University Press, ISBN 978-0-521-13572-6
