= Sinuessa =

Ancient Roman city on the coast of the Tyrrhenian Sea

Coordinates: 41.1414°N 13.8528°E

Sinuessa (Greek: Σινούεσσα or Σινόεσσα) was a city of Latium, in the more extended sense of the name, situated on the Tyrrhenian Sea, about 10 km north of the mouth of the Volturno River (the ancient Vulturnus). It was on the line of the Via Appia, and was the last place where that great highroad touched on the sea-coast. The ruins of the city are located in the modern-day comune of Sessa Aurunca . The city ruins are located, as the crow flies, 12.24 km SSW from the modern city of Sessa Aurunca and 41.43 km from the province of Caserta. It is 26.71 km from the regional capital (Naples/Napoli) Campania, Italy.

== History ==
It is certain that Sinuessa was not a pre-Roman city; indeed there is no trace of the existence of an Italic town on the spot before the foundation of the Roman colony. Some authors mention an obscure tradition that there had previously been a Greek city on the spot called "Sinope"; but little value can be attached to this statement. It is certain that if a pre-Roman settlement ever existed, it had wholly disappeared by the time of Roman colonization.

Sinuessa sat on a site that was part of the territory of the Ausones. The cities belonging to the Ausonian league were Ausona, Vescia, Minturnae, and Suessa. However, there are various controversies about the extent of the territory and composition of the league. During the Latin war, the cities of the league, like the Volsci and Campani, supported the Latins against Rome and their Samnite allies. The war, fought between 340 BC and 338 BC, ended with a Roman victory. The cities of the league again fought against Rome during the Second Samnite War which began in 326 BC and ended in 314 BC with another victory for the Romans. The cities of the league were completely destroyed, but were later founded as the colonies of Sessa Aurunca and Minturnae, cities that retained the name and similar location of those of the Aurunci.

Sinuessa seems to have rapidly risen into a place of importance; but its territory was severely ravaged in 217 BCE by Hannibal, whose cavalry carried their devastations up to the very gates of the town. It subsequently endeavored, in common with Minturnae and other coloniae maritimae, to establish its exemption from furnishing military levies; but this was overruled, while there was an enemy with an army in Italy. At a later period (191 BCE) Sinuessa again attempted, but with equal ill success, to procure a similar exemption from the naval service. Its position on the Appian Way doubtless contributed greatly to the prosperity of Sinuessa; for the same reason it is frequently incidentally mentioned by Cicero, and we learn that Julius Caesar halted there for a night on his way from Brundisium to Rome, in 49 BCE. It is noticed also by Horace on his journey to Brundusium, as the place where he met with his friends Varius and Virgil.

The fertility of its territory, and especially of the neighbouring ridge of the Mons Massicus, so celebrated for its wines, must also have tended to promote the prosperity of Sinuessa, but we hear little of it under the Roman Empire. It received a body of military colonists, apparently under the Triumvirate, but did not retain the rank of a colonia and is termed by Pliny as well as the Liber Coloniarum only an oppidum, or ordinary municipal town. It was the furthest town in Latium, as that geographical term was understood in the days of Strabo and Pliny, or Latium adjectum, as the latter author terms it; and its territory extended to the river Savo, which formed the limit between Latium and Campania. At an earlier period indeed Polybius reckoned it a town of Campania, and Ptolemy follows the same classification, as he makes the Liris the southern limit of Latium; but the division adopted by Strabo and Pliny is probably the most correct. The Itineraries all notice Sinuessa as a still existing town on the Appian Way, and place it nine miles from Minturnae, which is, however, considerably short of the true distance. In his Meditations, written around AD 180, the emperor Marcus Aurelius notes that his friend Junius Rusticus sent a letter to Marcus's mother from Sinuessa.

The city was the (purported) location of the Pseudo-Council of Sinuessa in AD 303. The period of its actual destruction is unknown.

== Ruins ==
The ruins of Sinuessa are still visible on the seacoast of Mons Massicus .(Baia Azzurra) - (Levagnole) is part of the municipality of Sessa Aurunca, in the province of Caserta, in the Campania region.It was so that in the V A.D. century, Sinuessa disappeared from the sources, too. The abandonment of the countries, the transformation in forests and fenlands of the fertile lands, the barbaric raids of the Vandals and the Saracens finished the deterioration of the zone that already started to suffer some consequences of the bradyseism that subsequently will submerge the ancient Sinuessanus habitat. All that forced the inhabitants to move to the surrounding rises of the one that had been the flourishing Roman colony. The inhabitants settled in the surroundings of Petrino Mount and founded a little urban agglomeration all around Montis dragonis rock of which the Longobards were owners from 840 to 1058 as it was a very strategic and impregnable place. Then the fortress became property of the Normans under Ricard II and from his wife name, Rocca, daughter of Dragone, the denomination of Montis Dragonis rock originated, even if the legend ascribes it to a dragon that roamed around the zone terrorizing the inhabitants. After the Normans, there were the Swabians; it's in this period that began the urban agglomeration and convents and monasteries spread out especially upon mountains. After the Swabians, there were the Aragoneses and the territory passed from the Marzanos to Carafas and finally to Grillos. Of this period, we have got the ducal tower added to the Baronial Palace that the Grillos enlarged to emulate the royal Palace of Caserta, without finishing the work. After the short period of French rulers, the territory became property of the Bourbons with Ferdinand IV until 1861, when the kingdom of Italy was proclaimed. The village of Baia Azzurra - Levagnole is 12.56 kilometers from the same town of Sessa Aurunca to which it belongs).The most important are those of an aqueduct, and of an edifice which appears to have been a triumphal arch; but the whole plain is covered with fragments of ancient buildings.

== Baths ==
At a short distance from Sinuessa were the baths or thermal springs called Aquae Sinuessanae which appear to have enjoyed a great reputation among the Romans. Pliny tells us they were esteemed a remedy for barrenness in women and for insanity in men. They are already mentioned by Livy as early as the Second Punic War; and though their fame was eclipsed at a later period by those of Baiae and other fashionable watering-places, they still continued in use under the Empire, and were resorted to among others by the emperor Claudius. It was there, also, that the infamous Tigellinus was compelled to put an end to his own life. The mild and warm climate of Sinuessa is extolled by some writers as contributing to the effect of the waters (Tacitus Annals xii. 66); hence it is called Sinuessa tepens by Silius Italicus, and mollis Sinuessa by Martial. The site of the waters is still called I Bagni, and the remains of Roman buildings still exist there.

== In popular culture ==
In the Starz series Spartacus: War of the Damned, Spartacus and his rebel army invade and take Sinuessa during the second episode, "Wolves at the Gate", and hold it in subsequent episodes.
