= Falernian wine =

Variety of ancient Roman wine

Falernian (Latin: Falernum) was a strong white wine highly prized in the classical Roman period on the slopes of Mount Falernus (now Monte Massico) near the border of Latium and Campania. Falernian wine was of at least two types, one relatively dry and the other sweet. It is impossible to know what grapes were used to make Falernian wine as several grapes are mentioned in the extant literature, none of which are cultivated today under the same name. It has been suggested that Aglianico was one of the grapes used but this is unlikely given that Aglianico is a dark skinned grape. Pliny the Elder in his Natural History offers a survey of the main ancient vine varieties but it is not possible to identify these with modern vine cultivars, any such identification is merely conjecture.

== Characteristics ==
Falernian wine grew in popularity, becoming one of the most highly regarded wines accessible to and consumed by the ancient Romans. In an Epyllion written in c. 92 CE, Silius Italicus, a prominent Roman senator, attributed its origin to a chance meeting between a mythic pauper named Falernus, who was said to have lived on Mount Falernus in the late 3rd century BCE, and Liber, the Roman god of viticulture. Considered a "first growth" or "cult wine" for its time, it was often mentioned in Roman literature, but disappeared after the classical period. There were three vineyards (or appellations) recognized by Romans: Caucinian Falernian from the vineyards on the highest slopes of Mount Falernus; Faustian Falernian, the most famous, from land on the central slopes corresponding to the current hilly areas of the town of Falciano del Massico and Carinola di Casanova, owned by Faustus, son of the Roman dictator Sulla; and wine from the lower slopes and plain that was simply called Falernian. The area is now occupied by the modern day vineyards of Rocca di Mondragone and Monte Massico.

Falernian was a white wine with a relatively high alcohol content, possibly 30 proof, or 15% ABV. In describing Faustian Falernian, Pliny the Elder alluded to this as he noted "It is the only wine that takes light when a flame is applied to it". A flaming drink requires an ABV of at least 40% (typically >50%) which cannot be achieved by fermentation alone, likely requiring distillation. It was produced from late-harvested grapes exclusively as a brief freeze or a series of frosts were said to improve the resulting wine's flavor. The wine was typically allowed to maderise, aging for 15–20 years in clay amphorae before drinking. The oxidation gave the wine a color of amber to dark brown. In 37 BCE, Varro wrote in Res Rusticae that Falernian increased in value as it matured, and Pliny recorded that Falernian from the famed Opimian vintage of 121 BCE was served at a banquet in 60 BCE honoring Julius Caesar for his conquests in Spain. There were three notable varieties: Dry (Latin austerum), Sweet (dulce), and Light (tenue).

== Popularity in Roman times ==
The physician and gourmet Galen, writing c. 180 CE, doubted that all the Falernian wine on sale in the Roman Empire could possibly be genuine. Pliny the Elder was an expert on Falernian wine, and wrote about friends claiming to be drinking it, when he could tell it was not. It was one of the first wines to be exported to Britain while it was a Roman settlement, but for whatever reason, Falernian must have gradually lost favour under the later Roman Empire, though it was still one of the seven named (and more expensive) wines whose maximum price for army purchase was laid down by the emperor Diocletian around 300 CE. In the ruins of ancient Pompeii, a price list on the wall of a bar establishment notes

For one as you can drink wine
For two you can drink the best
For four you can drink Falernian.

The Roman poet Catullus extolled the virtues of Falernian in one of his poems

Come, boy, you who serve out the old Falernian,
fill up stronger cups for me,
as the law of Postumia, mistress of the revels, ordains,
Postumia more tipsy than the tipsy grape.
But water, begone, away with you, water,
destruction of wine, and take up abode
with scrupulous folk. This is the pure Thyonian god.

The Roman poet Horace mentions Falernian in Odes 2.3:

Remember when things are troublesome
to keep an even mind, and likewise in prosperity
Be careful of too much
happiness, mortal Dellius,
Whether you will have lived your time in sadness,
Or whether you might while away merry days
Sprawled out on country meadows
With a mellowed vintage of Falernian.

It was also the wine that Petronius, in the Satyricon, has Trimalchio serve at his dinner banquet. Quintus Dellius complained to Cleopatra that while he and other dignitaries were served sour wine by Mark Antony in Greece, Augustus's catamite were drinking Falernian in Rome. This refers to Sarmentus, the former slave of Marcus Favonius, who was bought by Octavian and whom enemies of Octavian claimed to be a catamite, although historian Josiah Osgood dismisses this as nothing more than a slander "planted by supporters of Marc Anthony".

Dionysius of Halicarnassus in Book XIV. 6, 6-9, 2, describing Gauls ravaging Alban district during their expedition on Rome writes: "...There, as all gorged themselves with much food, drank much unmixed wine (the wine produced there is the sweetest of all wines after the Falernian and is the most like honey-wine), took more sleep than it was their custom..."

== See also ==
- Ancient Rome and wine

== Bibliography ==
- Andrew Dalby, Food in the Ancient World from A to Z. London, New York: Routledge, 2003. ISBN 0-415-23259-7.
