= Muranum =

Ancient town of the interior of Lucania

Muranum was an ancient town of the interior of Lucania, the name of which is not found in any ancient author; but its existence is proved by the Itinerary of Antoninus, which places a station "Summurano", evidently a corruption of "Sub Murano", on the road from Nerulum to Consentia (modern Cosenza); and this is confirmed by the inscription found at La Polla (ancient Forum Popilii), which gives the distance from that place to Muranum at 74 M.P. It is, therefore, evident that Muranum must have occupied the same site as the modern town of Morano Calabro (in the Province of Cosenza, Calabria, Italy), on a considerable hill, at the foot of which still runs the high road from Naples to Reggio di Calabria, and where was situated the station noticed in the Itinerary. Near it are the sources of the river Coscile, the ancient Sybaris. (Itin. Ant. pp. 105, 110; Orell. Inscr. 3308; Romanelli, vol. i. p. 387.)
