= Nerulum =

Nerulum was an ancient town in the interior of Lucania, mentioned by Livy during the wars of the Romans in that country, when it was taken by assault by the consul Lucius Aemilius Barbula, 317 BCE (Liv. ix. 20). The only other notice of it is found in the Itineraries, from which we learn that it was situated on the high-road from Capua to Rhegium (modern Reggio di Calabria), at the point of junction with another line of road which led from Venusia by Potentia (modern Potenza) and Grumentum towards the frontiers of Bruttium (Itin. Ant. pp. 105, 110; Tab. Peut.). The names and distances in this part of the Tabula are too corrupt and confused to be of any service: the Itinerary of Antoninus places it 14 miles (or according to another passage 16 miles) north of Muranum, the site of which is clearly ascertained at Morano Calabro. If the former distance be adopted as correct, it must have been situated at, or in the neighbourhood of, Rotonda, near the sources of the river Lao (Holsten. Not. ad Cluv. p. 293; Romanelli, vol. i. p. 389). The editors of the Barrington Atlas of the Greek and Roman World place Nerulum at Rotonda (in the Province of Potenza, Basilicata, Italy).
