= Vescia =

Ancient city in Italy

Coordinates: 42°59′N 12°44′E

Vescia was an ancient city of the Ausones (a subgroup of the Aurunci), in what is now central-southern Italy, which was part of the so-called Auruncan Pentapolis and was destroyed by the Romans in 340 BC.

== Description ==
Vescia was a fortified center, located perhaps on the left shore of the Garigliano river, in the current comuni of Cellole and Sessa Aurunca, where remains of pre-Roman walls have been found. According to some sources, it was located on the Monte Massico, where there also ancient remains including a subterranean aqueduct and large mosaic pavements.

== Inscriptions ==
Two Latin inscriptions referring to Vescia, dating to 211-212 AD, have been found in Castelforte, Formia, in the southern province of Latina. These are now in the Archaeological Museum of Minturno.
