= Monte Massico =

Mountain in Italy

- Location within Italy

Highest point
- Elevation: 813 m (2,667 ft)
- Coordinates: 41°07′51″N 14°00′03″E

Geography
- Location: Campania, Italy

Monte Massico (Latin: Mons Massicus; previously Mount Falernus) is a mountain situated in the Italian Province of Caserta (Campania) between the rivers Volturno and Garigliano.

== Description ==
Monte Massico is an Italian mountain ridge. In antiquity, it was described as being in the territory of the Aurunci, and on the border of Campania and Latium Adiectum, but attributed by most authors to the latter.

It projects south-west from the volcanic system of Rocca Monfina (see Suessa Aurunca) as far as the sea, and separates the lower course of the Liris from the plain of Campania. It consists of limestone, with a superstratum of pliocenic and volcanic masses, and was once an island; its highest point is 811 meters (2661 feet) above sea-level.

It was famous for its Falernian wine in ancient times. There was just room along the coast for the road to pass through; the pass was guarded by the Auruncan town of Vescia (probably on the mountain side), which ceased to exist in 314 BC after the defeat of the Ausones, but left its name to the spot. Its successor, Sinuessa, on the coast, a station on the Via Appia, was constructed in 312 BC, and a colony was founded there in 295 BC.

It was mentioned by classical writers as a place in which travellers halted. Here Virgil joined Horace on the famous journey to Brundisium. Domitian considerably increased its importance by the construction of the Via Domitiana, which left the Via Appia here and ran to Cumae and Puteoli, and it was he, no doubt, who raised it to the position of colonia Flavia. The town was destroyed by the Saracens, but some ruins of it are still visible two miles north-west of the modern village of Mondragone - the mineral springs which still rise here were frequented in antiquity.

== See also ==
- Falernian wine
