= Minturno =

- Comune
- Comune di Minturno
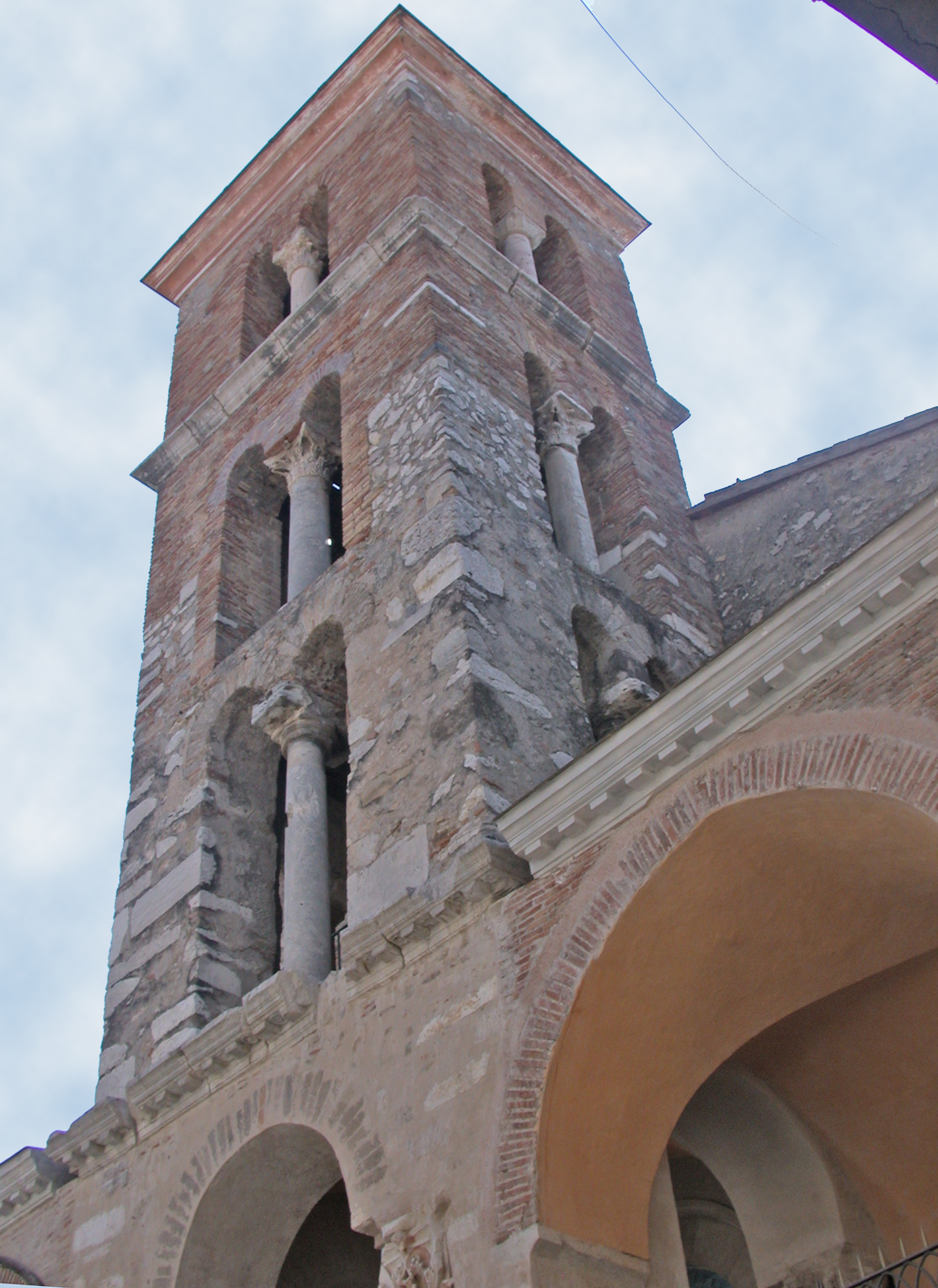
- View of Minturno Cathedral

- Location within Italy Location within Lazio
- Coordinates: 41°16′N 13°45′E
- Country: Italy
- Region: Lazio
- Province: Latina (LT)

Area
  - Total: 42 km^{2} (16 sq mi)

Population (2018-01-01)
  - Total: 19,804
  - Density: 470/km^{2} (1,200/sq mi)
- Time zone: UTC+1 (CET)
  - Summer (DST): UTC+2 (CEST)
- Patron saint: Madonna delle Grazie
- Saint day: September 1
- Website: Official website

UNESCO World Heritage Site
- Part of: Via Appia. Regina Viarum
- Criteria: Cultural: iii, iv, vi
- Reference: 1708-007
- Inscription: 2024 (46th Session)

Minturno is a city and comune in southern Lazio, Italy, situated on the north west bank of the Garigliano (known in antiquity as the Liris).

It has a station on the Rome-Naples main railway line.

== History ==
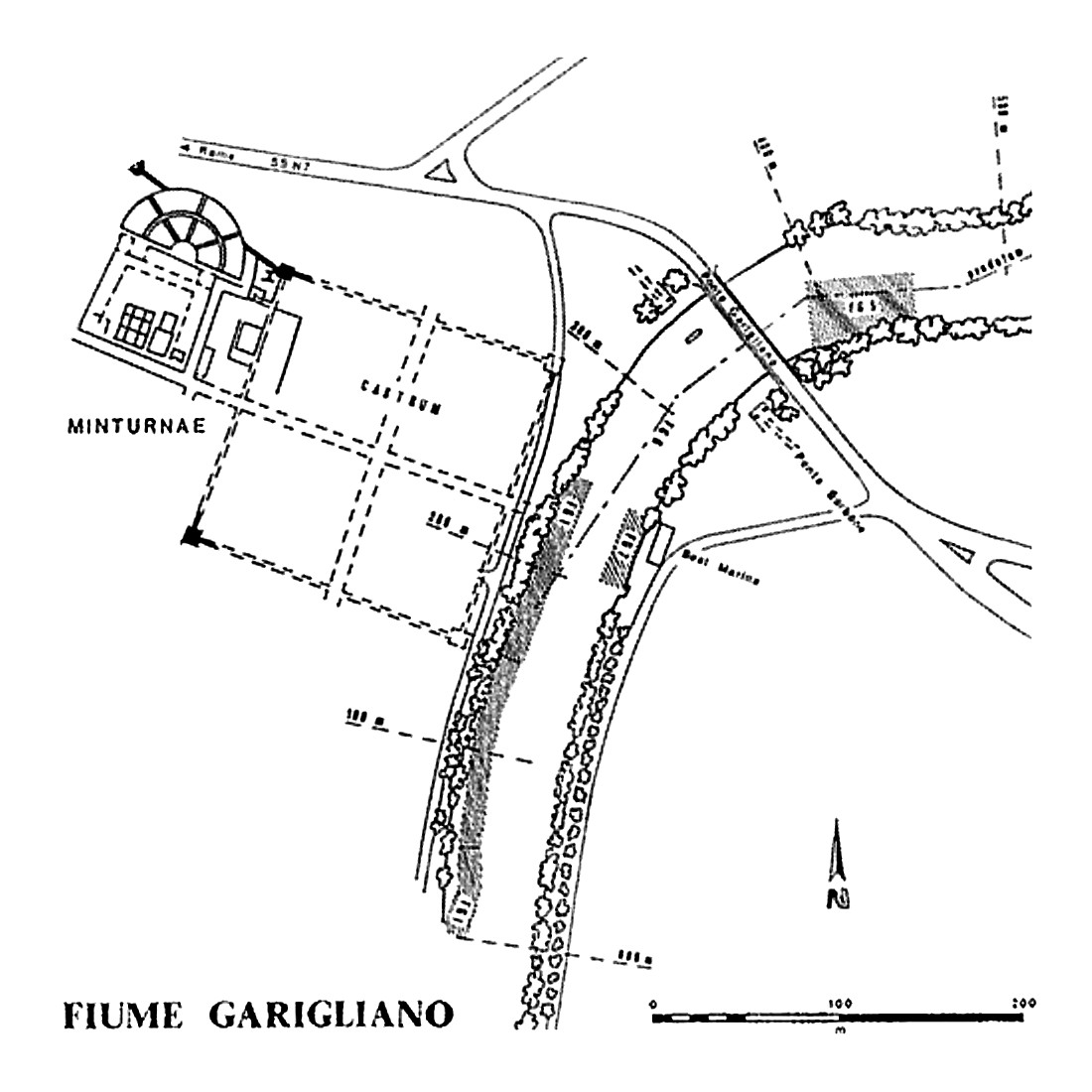
Early settlement plan of Castrum Minturnae

The nearby sanctuary of Marica, with an Italic tuff- volcanic rock temple, was built about 500 BC.

Ancient Minturnae was one of the three towns of the Ausones which made war against Rome in 314 BC, in the Second Samnite War, the other two being Ausona (modern Sessa Aurunca) and Vescia. It became a Roman settlement as a fort (Castrum Minturnae) in about 296 BC. The early town grew around the square fort with polygonal stone walls along the river and the contemporary via Appia as a military road. In the 3rd century BC, the town expanded with new tufa walls with towers.

The city was radically transformed when it became a colonia under Augustus, who ruled from 27 BC to 14 AD, when the urban tract of the via Appia was enhanced with porticos, temples to Augustus and Julius Caesar were built, and the theatre was rebuilt.

The city was further expanded under Hadrian, who ruled from 76 AD to 138 AD, with thermal baths, the macellum, nymphaeum, and an aqueduct. It was destroyed by the Langobards in 590. The city was probably also destroyed in 883 by the Saracens, who in the following years held the surrounding plain. Its low site was increasingly abandoned by the population in favour of that of the modern town of Minturno (known as Traetto or Traietto, from Latin Traiectum, until the 19th century), 140 metres (460 ft) above sea-level.

The Saracens were ousted by the Catholic league after the Battle of Garigliano (915), and Minturnae passed to Gaeta. Two years later, however, it was again ravaged, this time by the Magyars. In 1058, it was partly acquired by the Abbey of Montecassino, but soon after was conquered by the Normans.

In the 13th century, it went to Richard V dell'Aquila, duke of Gaeta. Subsequently, it was a Caetani possession, and later assigned by Charles VIII of France to his general Prospero Colonna. It was a Carafa fief until 1806, and was integrated in the newly formed Kingdom of Italy on 30 October 1861.

Minturno was part of the Gustav Line during World War II, and suffered heavy bombing.

== Main sights ==
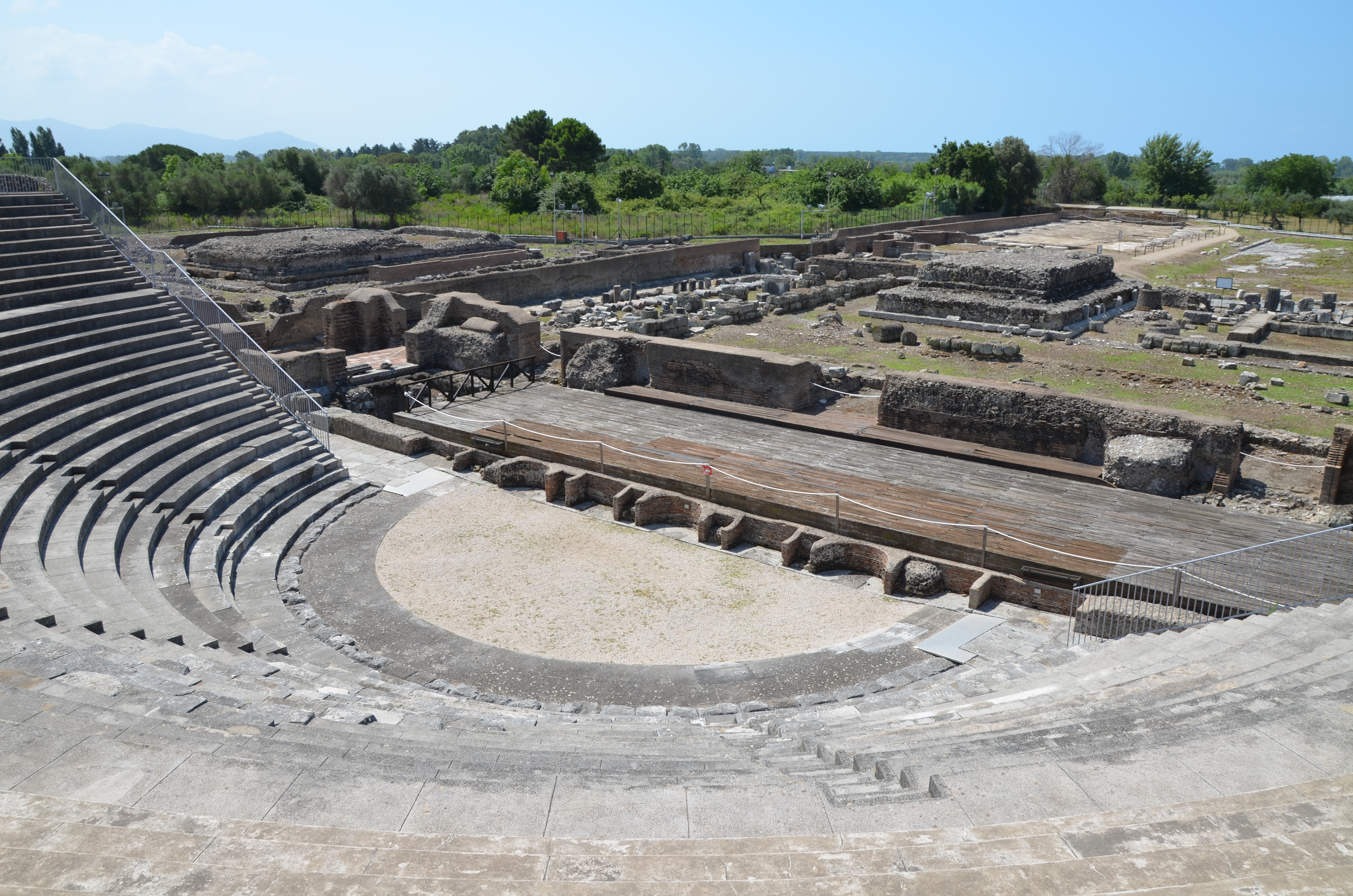
The Roman theatre

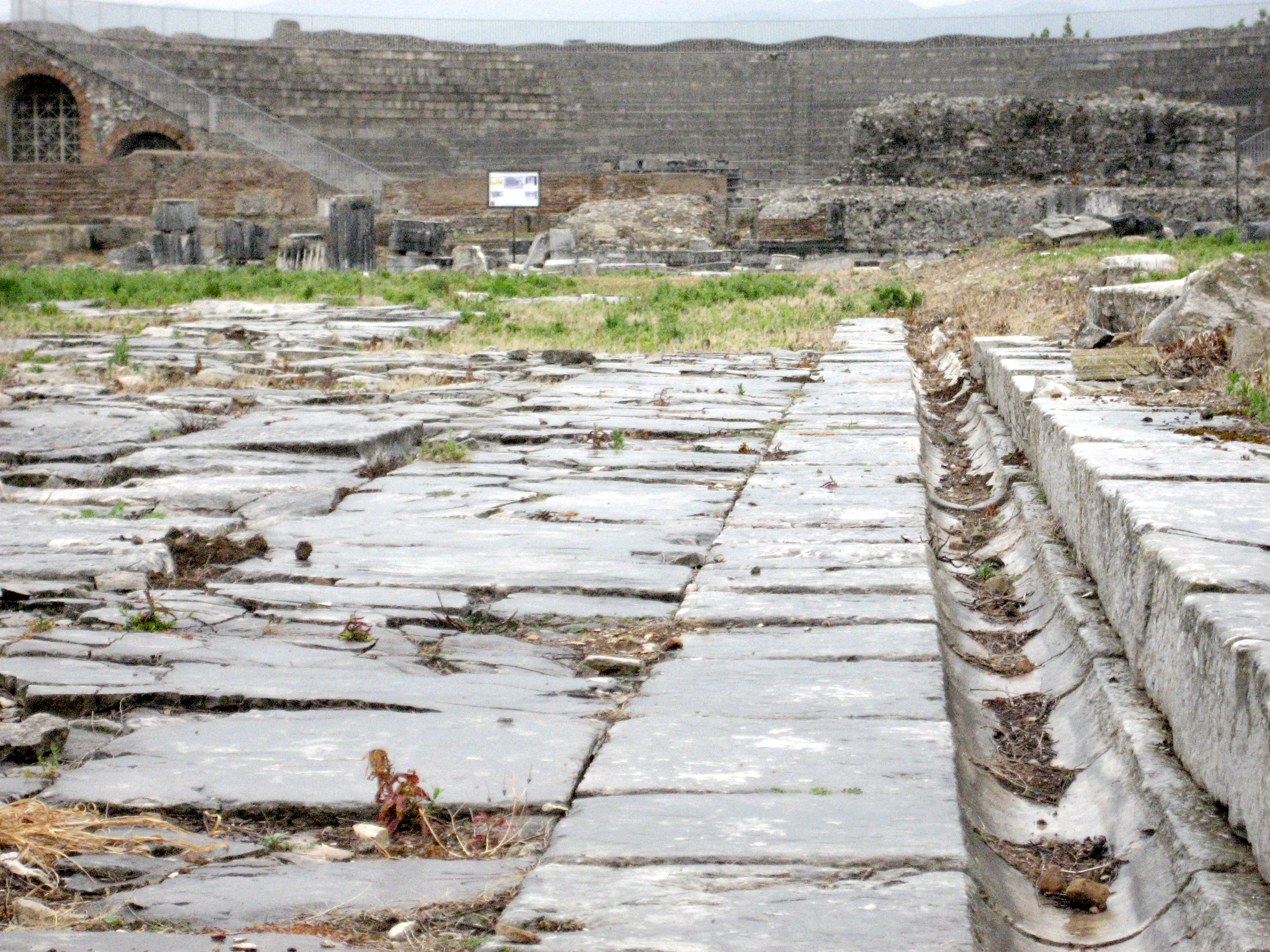
Imperial Forum

=== Roman remains ===
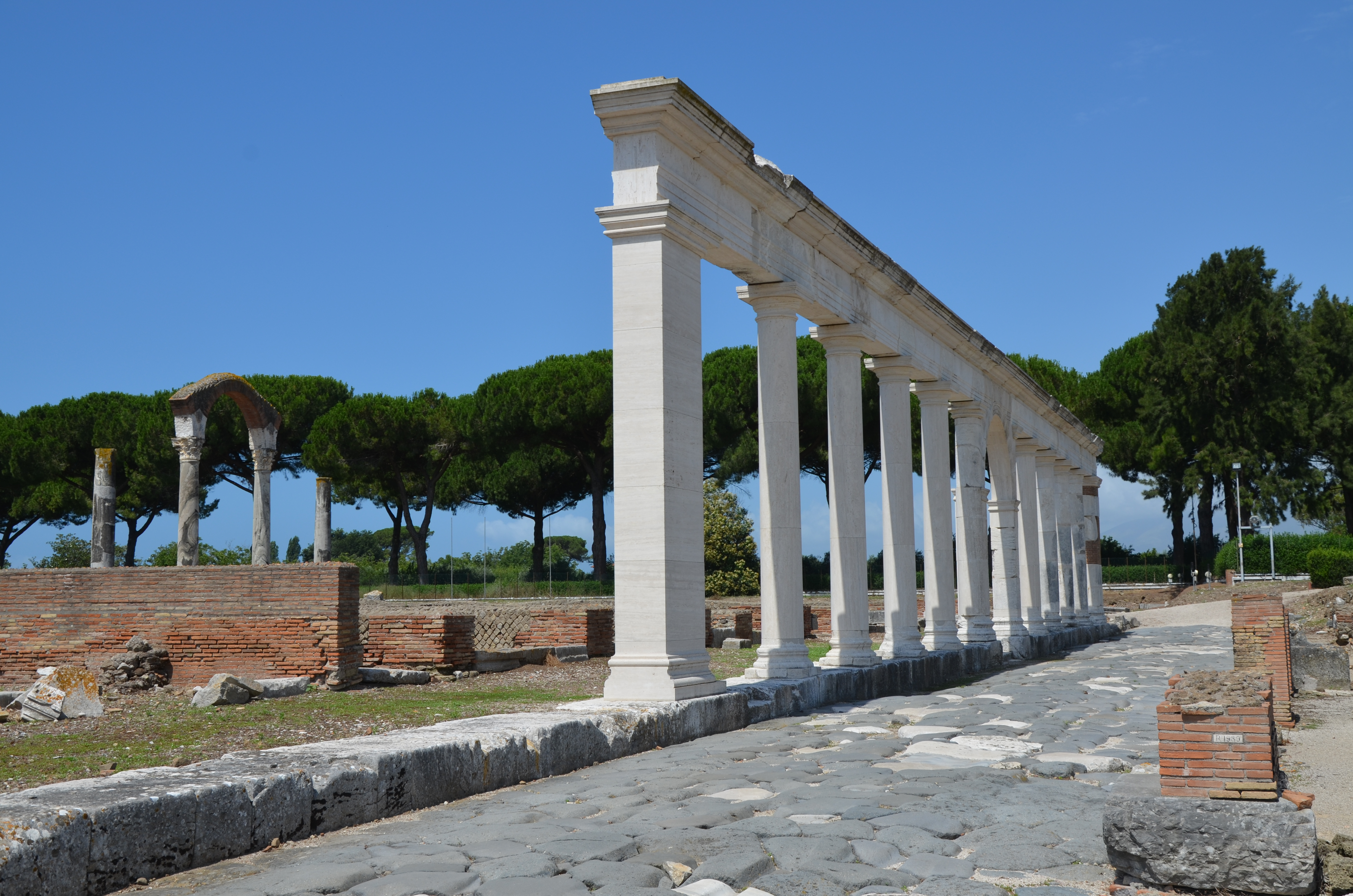
Monumental colonnade along the Appian Way

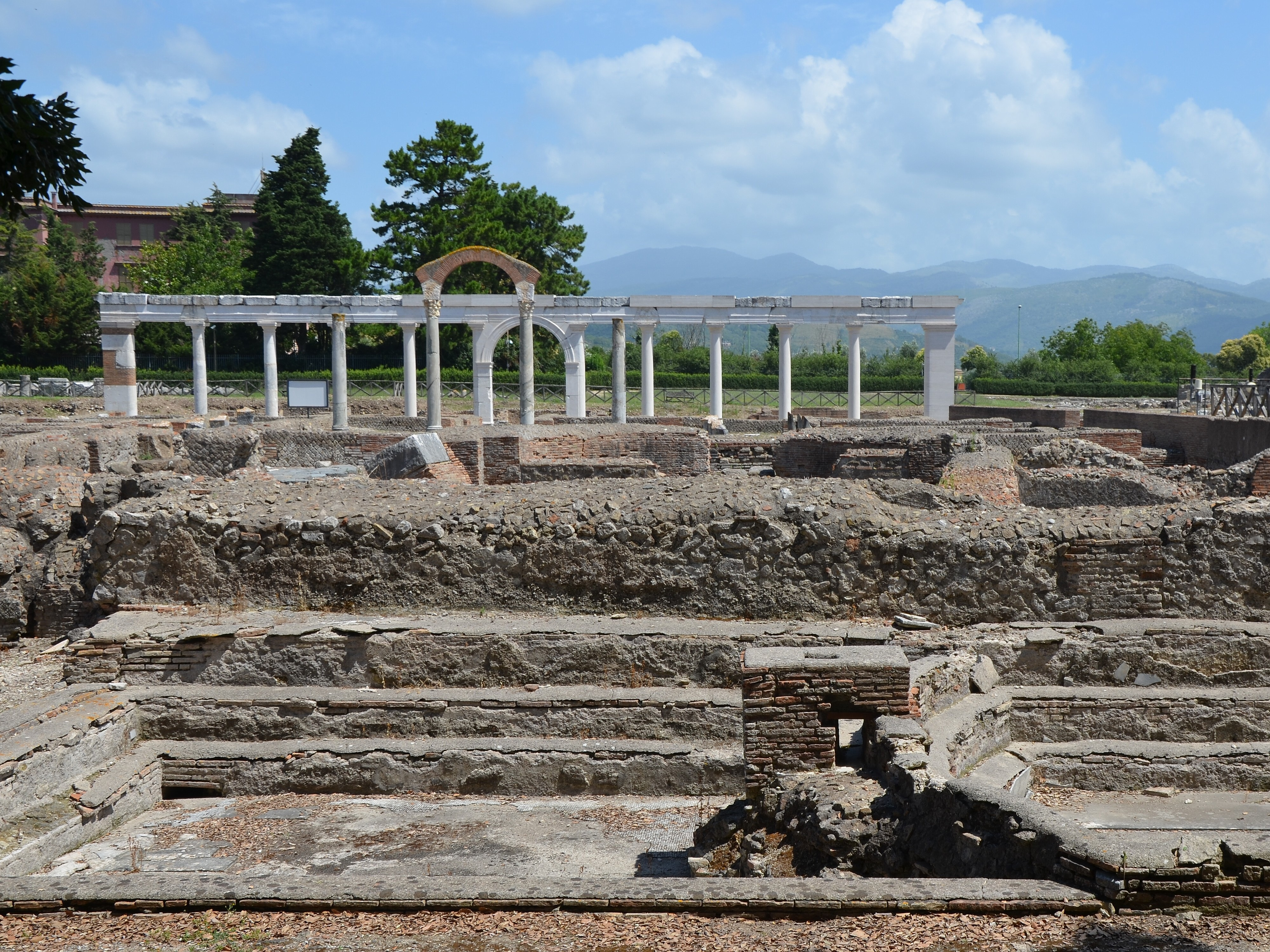
Baths swimming pool

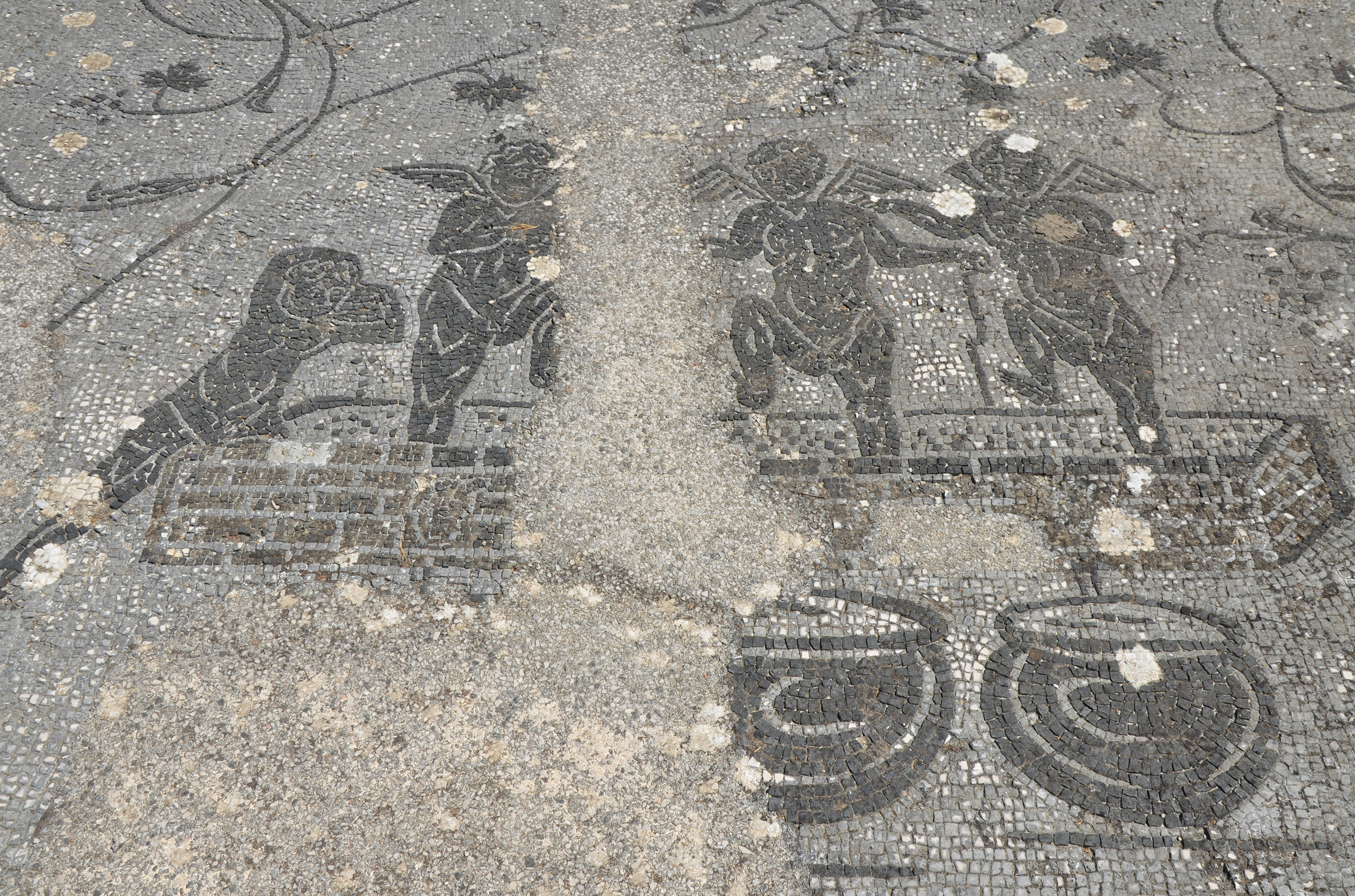
Mosaic in the calidarium

Many of the main monumental buildings of the ancient city are visible at their site outside the modern city. The impressive Roman remains mainly date to the Hadrianic period (built over earlier buildings) and consist of the:

- theatre in opus reticulatum
- aqueduct in opus reticulatum, the quoins of which are of various colours arranged in patterns to produce a decorative effect. A unique feature was that its castellum aquae (distribution basin) was part of the central pier of the city gate. It was more than 11 km long from its source at the springs of Capodacqua.
- thermal baths with large swimming pool
- Two Fora; Republican and Imperial. The imperial forum was built under the reconstruction by Augustus, opposite the republican forum. On its eastern side were later the most important public buildings: the curia and the basilica
- Appian Way as the decumanus maximus with monumental colonnade though the centre of the city
- macellum (meat market)
- Capitolium, built in Italic style after 191 BC, on the south of the Republican forum next to the Appian Way. It is similar to other Capitolia of this period at Pyrgi and Cosa and most likely was an affirmation of Roman loyalty and identity
- amphitheatre (now almost entirely demolished, but better preserved in the 18th century)

Close to the mouth of the river, about 2 km distant, was the sacred grove of the Italic goddess Marica.

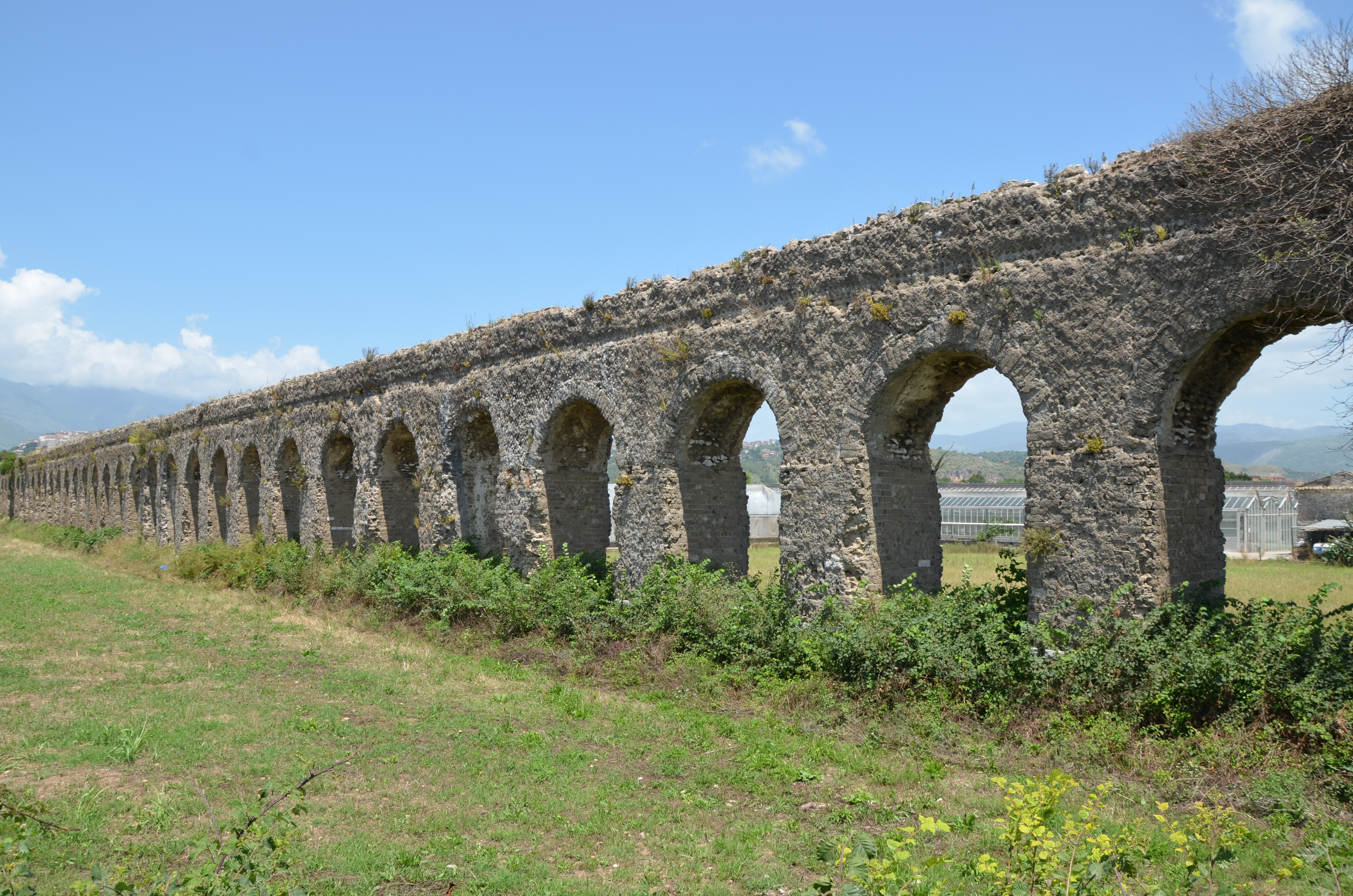
Aqueduct of Minturnae

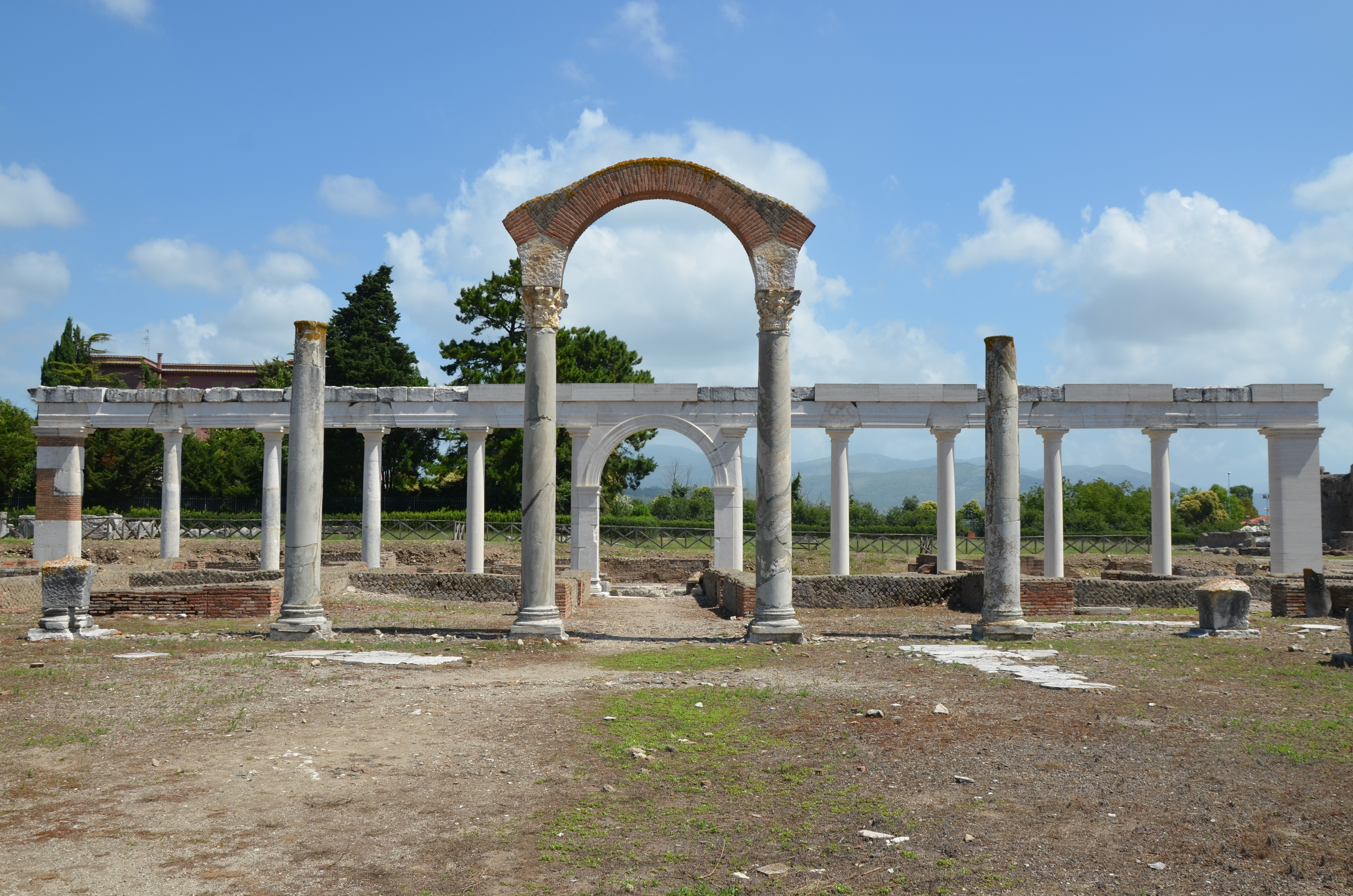
The macellum

=== Other sights ===
- The baronial Castle (C. 9th century) housed famous figures such as St. Thomas Aquinas, Isabella Colonna and Giulia Gonzaga
- The church of St. Francis, built around 1360 by Roffredo III Caetani, nephew of Pope Boniface VIII
- The church of Annunziata (c. 1300), damaged by the Turks pirates in 1552, by the French-Polish troops in 1799 and by a fire in 1888. In 1930 a restoration removed all the Baroque additions and showed the presence of ancient frescoes.
- The church of St. Peter (11th-12th centuries). The façade is preceded by a staircase and a porch with 4 arcades (14th century). The interior has a nave and two aisles divided by tall columns with ogival arcs. The right aisle houses the notable Baroque Sacrament Chapel (1587), decorated with polychrome marbles. Other art pieces include a candelabra (1264) with mosaic decoration, and the Pergagum, with antique columns and 13th-century mosaics. It has a three-floor belfry.
- Ferdinandeo Bridge over the River Garigliano was the first iron catenary suspension bridge built in Italy, and one of the earliest in continental Europe. This bridge, which was technologically advanced for its age, was built in 1832 by the Bourbon Kingdom of Two Sicilies.

The engineer who designed the bridge was Luigi Giura. The bridge has been rebuilt in recent time (1998), in fact was mined during the Second World War.

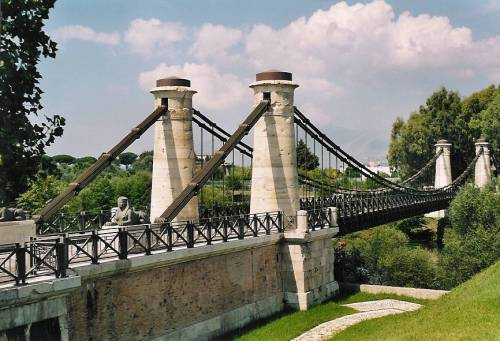
The Bourbon bridge on the Garigliano.

The suburb of Scauri, on the Gulf of Gaeta, may take its name from the Roman consul Marcus Aemilius Scaurus, who had a sumptuous villa here. It has some notable ancient watchtowers, including the Torre Saracena, at the mouth of the river Garigliano, erected between 961 and 981, commemorates a victory gained by Pope John X and his allies over the Saracens in 915 (see battle of Garigliano). It is built of Roman materials from Minturnae, including several inscriptions and sculptures.

== Emigrants ==
In the early 20th century, many residents of Minturno and the villages around it emigrated to Stamford, Connecticut, in the United States. A club for Minturnese immigrants, the Minturno Social Club was founded in the West Side of Stamford in 1939 (and has since moved to the Springdale district) and only made up of members whose families hailed from Minturno, had 120 members in 2007. A Minturnese tradition, the Festa de la Regna ("Festival of Wheat") celebration of harvest day and honoring the Madonna delle Grazie, is still honored in Stamford with an annual procession.

Michael Fedele, former lieutenant governor of Connecticut, was born in Minturno in 1955.

== Twin towns ==
- (United States) Stamford, USA, since 2008
