= 290s BC =

Decade

During the 290s BC, Hellenistic civilization begins its emergence throughout the successor states of the former Argead Macedonian Empire of Alexander the Great, resulting in the diffusion of Greek culture throughout the Levant and advances in science, mathematics, philosophy, etc. Meanwhile, the Roman Republic is embroiled in war against the Samnites, the Mauryan Empire continues to thrive in Ancient India, and the Kingdom of Qin in Ancient China, the one which in the future will conquer its adversaries and unite China, begins to emerge as a significant power during the Warring States period.

== Events ==
=== 299 BC ===
==== By place ====
====== Roman Republic ======
- The consul Marcus Fulvius Paetinus sacks the Umbrian city of Nequinum, which Rome had been besieging since the previous year, and he possibly also fights with success against the Sabines.
- Third Samnite War:

- A coalition of raiders from Cisalpine and Transalpine Gaul invade Etruria and are paid off by the Etruscans.
- Rome accuses the Etruscans of seeking to ally with the Gauls against Rome. The consul Titus Manlius Torquatus marches an army into Etruria but dies three days after falling from his horse. The new consul Marcus Valerius Corvus ravages Etruria, destroying villages in an attempt to provoke the Etruscans into battle.
- Rome allies with the Picentes.
- The Samnites invade Lucania after the latter refuses to join them in alliance. The Lucanians suffer several defeats and lose multiple towns.

====== China ======
- The State of Qin annexes eight cities of the state of Chu. Chu then sends an envoy to ask the King of Huai to go to Qin to negotiate peace. Qu Yuan risks his life to go up to the court to persuade the King of Huai not to go to the negotiation.
- The State of Zhao annexes the State of Zhongshan.
- King Wuling of Zhao abdicates the throne of Zhao to his son.

=== 298 BC ===
==== By place ====
====== Roman Republic ======
- Third Samnite War:

- The consuls Lucius Cornelius Scipio Barbatus and Gnaeus Fulvius Maximus Centumalus campaign against the Etruscans. Scipio fights a costly indecisive battle near Volaterrae.
- The Lucanians seek Roman aid against the invasion of the Samnites. In agreeing to take the Lucanians under their protection, the Romans commit to war against the Samnites.
- Fulvius invades central Samnium and defeats a Samnite army near Bovianum. He then captures Aufidena and possibly also Bovianum.
- Scipio captures Taurasia and Cisauna in eastern and south-eastern Samnium and subdues anti-Roman elements in Lucania. Fulvius possibly defeats a Lucanian force as well.

====== Sicily ======
- Agathocles, king of Syracuse, assists the Italian Greeks against the Bruttians and supports the Greeks against the Romans.

====== Egypt ======
- Ptolemy gives his stepdaughter Theoxena in marriage to Agathocles, the tyrant of Syracuse (in south-eastern Sicily).
- Ptolemy finally brings the rebellious region of Cyrene under his control. He places the region under the rule of his stepson Magas.

====== India ======
- Bindusara succeeds his father Chandragupta Maurya as emperor of the Mauryan Empire.

====== China ======
- King Huai of Chu visits the State of Qin to negotiate peace but is detained.

=== 297 BC ===
==== By place ====
====== Roman Republic ======
- Third Samnite War:

- The consul Publius Decius Mus intercepts and defeats a force of Apulians near Maleventum, who were intending to reinforce the main Samnite army.
- The consul Quintus Fabius Maximus Rullianus defeats an attempted ambush by the Samnite army in the Battle of Tifernum, killing 3400, capturing 830, and causing the army to flee. He then invades Samnium and storms the town of Cimetra.

====== Bithynia ======
- Zipoetes I assumes the title of basileus (king) in Bithynia.

====== Greece ======
- Following Cassander's death from illness, Philip IV, Cassander's eldest son, succeeds his father as King of Macedon, but soon after coming to the throne, he suffers from a wasting disease and dies. Antipater, the next son, rules jointly with his brother Alexander V.
- Demetrius Poliorcetes returns to Greece with the aim of becoming master of Macedonia. While Demetrius is in Greece, Lysimachus seizes his possessions in Asia Minor.
- Ptolemy decides to support Pyrrhus of Epirus and restores him to his kingdom. At first, Pyrrhus reigns with a kinsman, Neoptolemus II of Epirus (who is a son of Cleopatra of Macedonia and a nephew of Alexander the Great), but soon he has him assassinated.

====== India ======
- Chandragupta Maurya goes to Sravana Belagola, near Mysore, to live in the way of Jains.
- Bindusara, his son, ascends to the Pataliputra throne.

=== 296 BC ===
==== By place ====
====== Roman Republic ======
- Third Samnite War:

- The consul Lucius Volumnius Flamma Violens and the proconsuls Quintus Fabius Maximus Rullianus and Publius Decius Mus devastate the lands of Samnium.
- The Samnite noble Gellius Egnatius leads an army into Umbria and makes an alliance with the majority of the Etruscan city-states and some of the Umbrian cities.
- Following the departure of Gellius, the Romans in Samnium attack walled positions. Volumnius captures three forts, Decius captures the town of Murgantia, and Fabius captures the city of Romulea and the town of Ferentinum.
- The Samnite-Etruscan coalition campaigns against the consul Appius Claudius Caecus in Etruria and inflicts several defeats on the Romans.
- Volumnius orders Fabius to march into Lucania, where he stamps out pro-Samnite disturbances against the ruling class.
- Volumnius joins Appius in Etruria and they defeat the Samnite-Etruscan coalition in a battle, killing 6900 and capturing 2120.
- Volumnius launches a surprise attack against a Samnite column that had been raiding Campania. He frees 7400 Campanian prisoners, kills 6000 Samnites, and captures 2500 Samnites, including the general Statius Minacius and four military tribunes.
- Gellius has a powerful warband of Semnones reinforce the anti-Roman coalition, which is also joined by yet more cities of the Umbrians.

- The temple to Bellona is erected at the south end of the prata Flaminia, later the Circus Flaminius, in Rome.

====== Greece ======
- Ptolemy makes peace with Demetrius Poliorcetes, to whom he betrothes his daughter Ptolemais.

=== 295 BC ===
==== By place ====
====== Roman Republic ======
- Third Samnite War:

- The Samnites defeat the propraetor Lucius Cornelius Scipio Barbatus in Umbria in the Battle of Camerinum.
- The proconsul Lucius Volumnius Flamma Violens defeats a Samnite army at Mt Tifernus and invades Samnium.
- The consuls Quintus Fabius Maximus Rullianus and Publius Decius Mus march to Sentinum in Umbria. Facing a coalition army of Samnites, Semnones, Etruscans and Umbrians, they order the propraetors Gnaeus Fulvius Maximus Centumalus and Lucius Postumius Megellus, who were initially tasked with defending Rome, to raid Etruria as far as Clusium. This provokes the Etruscans to march to their homeland's defence, taking the Umbrians with them. In the subsequent Battle of Sentinum against the Samnites and Semnones, Decius is killed in an act of Devotio, and Fabius wins the battle. Gellius Egnatius, the mastermind behind the coalition, is cut down in the fighting, along with 25,000 Samnites and Semnones killed and 8000 captured.
- A force of Samnite fugitives are defeated by the Paeligni.
- Fulvius defeats a united force of Etruscans from Clusium and Perusia, and Fabius marches into Etruria and inflicts a further defeat on the Perusians.
- Volumnius and the praetor Appius Claudius Caecus (who is given command over Decius' army) defeat a Samnite army in the Stellate Plains, killing 16,300 and capturing 2700.

- August 19 – The first temple to Venus, the Roman goddess of love, beauty and fertility, is dedicated by Quintus Fabius Maximus Gurges.

====== Greece ======
- Athens falls to Demetrius Poliorcetes after a bitter siege, and its tyrant Lachares is killed.
- The king of Macedon, Antipater II, murders his mother Thessalonike, accusing her of being too fond of his brother and co-ruler Alexander V.

=== 294 BC ===
==== By place ====
====== Greece ======
- Archidamus IV, king of Sparta, son of Eudamidas I and grandson of Archidamus III, is defeated by Demetrius Poliorcetes of Macedonia in a battle at Mantinea. Sparta is saved only because Demetrius is called away by the threatening activities of his rivals Lysimachus and Ptolemy.
- Alexander V of Macedon is ousted by his brother, Antipater II. Therefore Alexander V turns to Demetrius Poliorcetes for help in recovering his throne. However, Demetrius Poliorcetes establishes himself on the throne of Macedonia and then murders Alexander V. Antipater II loses the throne of Macedonia but is able to survive.
- Pyrrhus of Epirus exploits the dynastic quarrel in Macedonia involving Alexander V of Macedon, his brother, Antipater II and Demetrius Poliorcetes to take over the frontier areas of Parauaea and Tymphaea, along with Acarnania, Ampholochia, and Ambracia.
- Lysimachus concludes a peace with Demetrius Poliorcetes whereby Demetrius Poliorcetes is recognized as ruler of Macedonia.

====== Roman Republic ======
- Third Samnite War:

- On a road connecting Roman and Samnite territory, the Samnites attack and nearly capture the camp of consul Marcus Atilius Regulus, who retreats to Sora and is joined by consul Lucius Postumius Megellus. The combining of consular armies prompts the Samnite army to withdraw to Samnium.
- Postumius storms the Samnite city of Milionia, and several other towns, including Fertrum, are abandoned by their inhabitants and occupied by Postumius.
- Without senatorial permission, Postumius marches to Etruria, wins an engagement against the Volsinii and storms the town of Rusellae. The cities of Volsinii, Perusia, and Arretium sue for peace with Rome and obtain truces for forty years.
- Atilius marches to Apulia to relieve Luceria from a Samnite siege but is intercepted by the Samnites near the city, where he is defeated by a smaller army. He then wins an engagement against the Volcentes.
- After an unsuccessful attempt to capture the Roman colony of Interamna, a Samnite army raids the surrounding countryside only to be attacked by Atilius, who recovers the booty.
- Against precedent, Postumius has the Comitia Centuriata vote him a triumph despite senatorial opposition.

====== Egypt ======
- Ptolemy gains control over Cyprus and the Phoenician coastal towns of Tyre and Sidon.

====== Seleucid Empire ======
- Stratonice, daughter of Demetrius Poliorcetes and wife of Seleucus marries her stepson Antiochus. Seleucus has reportedly instigated the marriage after discovering that his son by his late wife Apama was in danger of dying of lovesickness as he has fallen in love with his beautiful stepmother.

====== China ======
- General Bai Qi of the State of Qin launches a surprise attack on the State of Han and captures the city of Xincheng.

=== 293 BC ===
==== By place ====
====== Roman Republic ======
- Third Samnite War:

- Lucius Postumius Megellus, a consul of the previous year, avoids prosecution after he is appointed legate to consul Spurius Carvilius Maximus.
- The consul Carvilius captures the city of Amiternum, and consul Lucius Papirius Cursor captures the city of Duronia.
- On the same day that Carvilius storms the major Samnite city of Cominium, Papirius, aided by former consuls Lucius Volumnius Flamma Violens and Lucius Cornelius Scipio Barbatus, defeats the 'Linen Legion' in the Battle of Aquilonia and captures the city of Aquilonia during the Samnite retreat. The Samnites suffer 20,340 killed and 3870 captured in the Battle of Aquilonia and 4880 killed and 11,400 captured in the Siege of Cominium.
- Carvilius captures the towns of Velia, Palumbinum, and, after an initial defeat, Herculaneum, and after fighting the Samnites in the field, Papirius besieges and captures the city of Saepinum.
- Due to renewed hostility among some of the Etruscans, who are joined by the Falisci, Carvilius marches to Etruria, storms the town of Troilum and captures five forts. The Falisci then sue for peace and receive a one-year truce.

- The worship of Aesculapius is introduced from Epidaurus to Rome in the hope of ending a plague.

====== Greece ======
- The Boeotians revolted against Demetrius Poliorcetes, the King of Macedon. They received help from the Aetolians and the Spartans.

====== Persia ======
- When an invasion of nomads threatens the eastern possessions of his realm (i.e. between the Caspian Sea and the Aral Sea and the Indian Ocean), Seleucus hands over the government of these lands west of the Euphrates to his son Antiochus. Antiochus is appointed co-regent and commander-in-chief of these territories.

====== China ======
- The State of Qin, led by commander Bai Qi, wins a decisive victory over the States of Wei and Han in the Battle of Yique. He then captures territories in Han before invading and capturing further territories in Wei.

=== 292 BC ===
==== By place ====
====== Greece ======
- Lysimachus tries to extend his influence beyond the Danube River, but he is defeated and taken prisoner by the Getae (Dacian) king Dromichaetes (Dromihete). Eventually, Lysimachus is set free and a peace is agreed between the Getae and Lysimachus. This peace agreement is strengthened further by the marriage of Dromichaetes with Lysimachus' daughter.
- While Demetrius Poliorcetes is campaigning in Boeotia, he receives news that Lysimachus, the ruler of Thrace, has been taken prisoner by Dromichaetes. Hoping to seize Lysimachus's territories in Thrace, Demetrius, delegates command of his forces in Boeotia to his son, Antigonus and immediately marches north. However, while he is away, the Boeotians rise in rebellion, but are defeated by Antigonus, who bottles them up in the city of Thebes and puts them under siege.
- Antiochus I Soter anointed as king of the Seleucid Syria

====== Roman Republic ======
- Third Samnite War:

- The Samnites reappoint Gavius Pontius, the victor of the Battle of Caudine Forks, as general, and in Campania he defeats the consul Quintus Fabius Maximus Gurges. However, Fabius is joined by his father, Q. Fabius Maximus Rullianus, as legate and de facto general, and they defeat Pontius in battle and capture the general and his camp. They then capture several towns of the Pentri, a prominent tribe of the Samnites.
- The Falisci renew their efforts against Rome. However, the consul Decimus Junius Brutus Scaeva, assisted by former consul Spurius Carvilius Maximus, defeats them in an engagement and ravages their territory and those of the Etruscans. The Falisci and Etruscans again sue for peace, and this ends the Etruscan theatre of the Third Samnite War.

====== China ======
- General Bai Qi of the State of Qin defeats the State of Wei in a major battle and captures cities in Wei. Wei cedes control of 61 towns and cities.

=== 291 BC ===
==== By place ====
====== Greece ======
- Demetrius Poliorcetes joins his son, Antigonus, in the siege of Thebes. As the Thebans defend their city stubbornly, Demetrius forces his men to attack the city at great cost. Demetrius finally takes the city after using siege engines to demolish its walls.

====== Roman Republic ======
- Third Samnite War:

- The proconsul Q. Fabius Maximus Gurges and legate Q. Fabius Maximus Rullianus besiege the Samnite town of Cominium Ocritum, but the consul Lucius Postumius Megellus orders Fabius Gurges to relinquish his command and evacuate Samnium, despite the fact that the Senate had appointed Fabius proconsul to campaign against the Samnites.
- Fabius Gurges celebrates a triumph, at which the Samnite general Gavius Pontius is beheaded.
- Postumius captures Cominium Ocritum, the major city of Venusia and other towns, killing 10,000 and capturing 6200. At the proposal of Postumius, the Senate sends 20,000 colonists to occupy Venusia, the largest Roman colony to date. However, angered by the various crimes of Postumius, the Senate does not choose him as one of the leaders of the colony and denies him a triumph.
- Postumius celebrates a triumph on his own authority and dismisses his army before the consuls for the following year can take over.

====== China ======
- Generals Sima Cuo and Bai Qi of the State of Qin attack the State of Wei and capture the city of Yuan. Next, Sima Cuo captures the cities of Zhi and Deng.
- Bai Qi then captures the city of Wan in the state of Chu.

=== 290 BC ===
==== By place ====
====== Roman Republic ======
- Third Samnite War:

- Lucius Postumius Megellus, a consul from the previous year, is publicly tried for having used his office to have 2000 of his soldiers work on his farm. He is condemned by all the tribes and fined 50,000 denarii.
- The consuls Manius Curius Dentatus and Publius Cornelius Rufinus invade Samnium and defeat the Samnites in several engagements. The Samnites sue for peace, thus ending the Third Samnite War. The Samnites are recognised by the Romans as autonomous allies but are subordinate to Rome and must give up land as compensation.
- Curius subjugates the Sabines, possibly for their actions or inaction during the Third Samnite War. Their territory is annexed, securing direct Roman access to the Adriatic. The Sabines are granted civitas sine suffragio ("citizenship without the right to vote").
- Rome founds the colonies of Castrum, Sena and Adria.

====== Egypt ======
- Berenice, wife of Ptolemy, is proclaimed queen of Egypt. Ptolemy has the city of Berenice built on the Red Sea in her honour. It becomes a great emporium for Egyptian trade with the East.

====== China ======
- The city of Yuan is returned by the State of Qin to the State of Wei in exchange for the cities of Puban and Pishi.

== Significant people ==
- Nan, Zhou dynasty king of China, r. 314–256 BC
- Mencius, Chinese Confucian philosopher
- Perunar killi, King of the Chola Empire, r. 316-286 BC
- Huai, King of Chu, r. 328–299 BC
- Qingxiang, King of Chu, r. 299–263 BC
- Qu Yuan, poet, scholar, and minister from Chu
- Ptolemy I, Pharaoh of Egypt, r. 305–285 BC
- Euclid of Alexandria, mathematician and "Father of Geometry"
- Onias I High-Priest of Israel, held position 320–280 BC
- Neoptolemus II, King of Epirus, r. 302–297 BC
- Pyrrhus I, King of Epirus, r. 307–302, 297–272 BC
- Pharnavaz I, King of Caucasian Iberia r. 302-237
- Énna Aignech, Legendary High-King of Ireland, r. 313-293 BC
- Crimthann Coscrach, Legendary High-King of Ireland, r. 293-289 BC
- Kōan, Legendary Emperor of Japan, r. 392–291 BC
- Kōrei, Legendary Emperor of Japan, r. 291–215 BC
- Aktisanes, King of Kush, r. c. 300-290 BC
- Cassander, King of Macedon, r. 305–297 BC
- Philip IV, King of Macedon, r. 297 BC
- Alexander V and Antipater II, co-kings of Macedon r. 297–294 BC
- Demetrius I, King of Macedon, r. 294–288 BC
- Epicurus, Greek philosopher (founder of Epicureanism)
- Chandragupta Maurya, Mauryan dynasty Emperor of India, r. 322–298 BC
- Bindusara, Mauryan dynasty Emperor of India, r. 298–272 BC
- Chanakya, Mauryan Prime Minister
- Zhaoxiang, King of Qin, r. 307–251 BC
- Bai Qi, Qin general
- Lucius Cornelius Scipio Barbatus, Roman Consul and general, in office 298 BC
- Publius Decius Mus, Roman Consul, in office 312, 308, 297, 295 BC
- Fabius Maximus Rullianus, Roman Consul and general, in office 322, 315, 310, 308, 297, 295 BC
- Lucius Volumnius Flamma Violens, Roman Consul and general, in office 307, 296 BC
- Appius Claudius Caecus, Roman Consul and Censor, in office 312-308, 307, 296, 285 BC
- Lucius Postumius Megellus, in office 305, 294, 291 BC
- Spurius Carvilius Maximus, Roman Consul, in office 293, 272 BC
- Lucius Papirius Cursor, Roman Consul, in office 293, 272 BC
- Manius Curius Dentatus, Roman Consul and general, in office 290, 284, 275, 274 BC
- Gellius Egnatius, Samnite general during the Third Samnite War
- Gavius Pontius, Samnite general during the Second and Third Samnite Wars
- Seleucus I, King of the Seleucid Empire, r. 305–281 BC
- Antiochus, Prince, commander of western territories, and future king of the Seleucid Empire
- Berossus of Babylon, astronomer and writer
- Megasthenes, traveller, geographer, and Seleucid ambassador to the Mauryan Empire
- Areus I (Agaid king) r. 309–265 and Archidamus IV (Eurypontid king) r. 305–275 BC, Co-kings of Sparta
- Agathocles, Tyrant of Syracuse, in office 317–289 BC
- Lysimachus, King of Thrace and Asia Minor, r. 306-281 BC (Thrace), 301-281 BC (Asia Minor)
- Cotys II, King of Odrysian Thrace, r. 300-280 BC
- Wuling, King of Zhao, r. 326–299 BC
- Huiwen, King of Zhao, r. 299–266 BC

== Births ==
295 BC

- Apollonius of Rhodes, Greek poet and librarian (approximate date)
- Ptolemy, son of Pyrrhus of Epirus (d. 272 BC)

291 BC

- Lü Buwei, Chinese politician and chancellor of the Qin State (d. 235 BC)

290 BC

- Lucius Caecilius Metellus, Roman consul and Pontifex Maximus (approximate date) (d. 221 BC)

== Deaths ==
299 BC

- Titus Manlius Torquatus, Roman consul

297 BC

- King Cassander of Macedon, one of the diadochoi ("successors"), the Macedonian generals who have fought over the empire of Alexander the Great after his death (b. c. 358 BC)
- Chandragupta Maurya, Emperor of the Maurya Empire in India, r. 322–297 BC (approximate date)

295 BC

- Gellius Egnatius, Roman military leader of the Samnites
- Publius Decius Mus, Roman consul (killed in the Battle of Sentinum)
- Thessalonike of Macedon, daughter of king Philip II of Macedon and wife of Cassander (b. 352 BC)
- Wuling of Zhao, Chinese king of Zhao (b. 340 BC)
- Zhuang Zhou, Chinese philosopher (approximate date)

291 BC

- Menander, Athenian dramatist, considered to be a master of Greek New Comedy (b. c. 342 BC)
- Dinarchus, Athenian speech writer whose work is generally thought to reflect the gradual decline of Attic oratory (b. c. 361 BC)
- Gavius Pontius, Samnite general
- Emperor Kōan of Japan, according to legend.

290 BC

- Megasthenes, Greek historian, diplomat and Indian ethnographer (approximate date) (b. c. 350 BC)
