= 295 BC =

295 BC in various calendars
- Gregorian calendar: 295 BC; CCXCV BC
- Ab urbe condita: 459
- Ancient Egypt era: XXXIII dynasty, 29
- Pharaoh: Ptolemy I Soter, 29
- Ancient Greek Olympiad (summer): 121st Olympiad, year 2
- Assyrian calendar: 4456
- Balinese saka calendar: N/A
- Bengali calendar: −888 – −887
- Berber calendar: 656
- Buddhist calendar: 250
- Burmese calendar: −932
- Byzantine calendar: 5214–5215
- Chinese calendar: 乙丑年 (Wood Ox); 2403 or 2196 — to — 丙寅年 (Fire Tiger); 2404 or 2197
- Coptic calendar: −578 – −577
- Discordian calendar: 872
- Ethiopian calendar: −302 – −301
- Hebrew calendar: 3466–3467
- Hindu calendars
- Vikram Samvat: −238 – −237
- Shaka Samvat: N/A
- Kali Yuga: 2806–2807
- Holocene calendar: 9706
- Iranian calendar: 916 BP – 915 BP
- Islamic calendar: 944 BH – 943 BH
- Javanese calendar: N/A
- Julian calendar: N/A
- Korean calendar: 2039
- Minguo calendar: 2206 before ROC 民前2206年
- Nanakshahi calendar: −1762
- Seleucid era: 17/18 AG
- Thai solar calendar: 248–249
- Tibetan calendar: ཤིང་མོ་གླང་ལོ་ (female Wood-Ox) −168 or −549 or −1321 — to — མེ་ཕོ་སྟག་ལོ་ (male Fire-Tiger) −167 or −548 or −1320

The year 295 BC was a year of the pre-Julian Roman calendar. It was known in the Roman Republic as the Year of the Consulship of Rullianus and Mus (or, less frequently, year 459 Ab urbe condita). The designation "295 BC" has been used since the early medieval period, when the Anno Domini calendar era became the dominant system for naming years in Europe.

== Events ==
=== By place ===
==== Roman Republic ====
- Third Samnite War:

- The Samnites defeat the propraetor Lucius Cornelius Scipio Barbatus in Umbria in the Battle of Camerinum.
- The proconsul Lucius Volumnius Flamma Violens defeats a Samnite army at Mt Tifernus and invades Samnium.
- The consuls Quintus Fabius Maximus Rullianus and Publius Decius Mus march to Sentinum in Umbria. Facing a coalition army of Samnites, Semnones, Etruscans and Umbrians, they order the propraetors Gnaeus Fulvius Maximus Centumalus and Lucius Postumius Megellus, who were initially tasked with defending Rome, to raid Etruria as far as Clusium. This provokes the Etruscans to march to their homeland's defence, taking the Umbrians with them. In the subsequent Battle of Sentinum against the Samnites and Semnones, Decius is killed in an act of Devotio, and Fabius wins the battle. Gellius Egnatius, the mastermind behind the coalition, is cut down in the fighting, along with 25,000 Samnites and Semnones killed and 8000 captured.
- A force of Samnite fugitives are defeated by the Paeligni.
- Fulvius defeats a united force of Etruscans from Clusium and Perusia, and Fabius marches into Etruria and inflicts a further defeat on the Perusians.
- Volumnius and the praetor Appius Claudius Caecus (who is given command over Decius' army) defeat a Samnite army in the Stellate Plains, killing 16,300 and capturing 2700.

- August 19 – The first temple to Venus, the Roman goddess of love, beauty and fertility, is dedicated by Quintus Fabius Maximus Gurges.

==== Greece ====
- Athens falls to Demetrius Poliorcetes after a bitter siege, and its tyrant Lachares flees into exile.
- The king of Macedon, Antipater II, murders his mother Thessalonike, accusing her of being too fond of his brother and co-ruler Alexander V.

== Births ==
- Apollonius of Rhodes, Greek poet and librarian (approximate date)
- Ptolemy, son of Pyrrhus of Epirus (d. 272 BC)

== Deaths ==
- Gellius Egnatius, Roman military leader of the Samnites
- Publius Decius Mus, Roman consul (killed in the Battle of Sentinum)
- Thessalonike of Macedon, daughter of king Philip II of Macedon and wife of Cassander (b. 352 BC)
- Wuling of Zhao, Chinese king of Zhao (b. 340 BC)
- Zhuang Zhou, Chinese philosopher (approximate date)
