= 293 BC =

293 BC in various calendars
- Gregorian calendar: 293 BC; CCXCIII BC
- Ab urbe condita: 461
- Ancient Egypt era: XXXIII dynasty, 31
- Pharaoh: Ptolemy I Soter, 31
- Ancient Greek Olympiad (summer): 121st Olympiad, year 4
- Assyrian calendar: 4458
- Balinese saka calendar: N/A
- Bengali calendar: −886 – −885
- Berber calendar: 658
- Buddhist calendar: 252
- Burmese calendar: −930
- Byzantine calendar: 5216–5217
- Chinese calendar: 丁卯年 (Fire Rabbit); 2405 or 2198 — to — 戊辰年 (Earth Dragon); 2406 or 2199
- Coptic calendar: −576 – −575
- Discordian calendar: 874
- Ethiopian calendar: −300 – −299
- Hebrew calendar: 3468–3469
- Hindu calendars
- Vikram Samvat: −236 – −235
- Shaka Samvat: N/A
- Kali Yuga: 2808–2809
- Holocene calendar: 9708
- Iranian calendar: 914 BP – 913 BP
- Islamic calendar: 942 BH – 941 BH
- Javanese calendar: N/A
- Julian calendar: N/A
- Korean calendar: 2041
- Minguo calendar: 2204 before ROC 民前2204年
- Nanakshahi calendar: −1760
- Seleucid era: 19/20 AG
- Thai solar calendar: 250–251
- Tibetan calendar: མེ་མོ་ཡོས་ལོ་ (female Fire-Hare) −166 or −547 or −1319 — to — ས་ཕོ་འབྲུག་ལོ་ (male Earth-Dragon) −165 or −546 or −1318

Year 293 BC was a year of the pre-Julian Roman calendar. At the time it was known as the Year of the Consulship of Cursor and Maximus (or, less frequently, year 461 Ab urbe condita). The denomination 293 BC for this year has been used since the early medieval period, when the Anno Domini calendar era became the prevalent method in Europe for naming years.

== Events ==
=== By place ===
==== Roman Republic ====
- Third Samnite War:

- Lucius Postumius Megellus, a consul of the previous year, avoids prosecution after he is appointed legate to consul Spurius Carvilius Maximus.
- The consul Carvilius captures the city of Amiternum, and consul Lucius Papirius Cursor captures the city of Duronia.
- On the same day that Carvilius storms the major Samnite city of Cominium, Papirius, aided by former consuls Lucius Volumnius Flamma Violens and Lucius Cornelius Scipio Barbatus, defeats the 'Linen Legion' in the Battle of Aquilonia and captures the city of Aquilonia during the Samnite retreat. The Samnites suffer 20,340 killed and 3870 captured in the Battle of Aquilonia and 4880 killed and 11,400 captured in the Siege of Cominium.
- Carvilius captures the towns of Velia, Palumbinum, and, after an initial defeat, Herculaneum, and after fighting the Samnites in the field, Papirius besieges and captures the city of Saepinum.
- Due to renewed hostility among some of the Etruscans, who are joined by the Falisci, Carvilius marches to Etruria, storms the town of Troilum and captures five forts. The Falisci then sue for peace and receive a one-year truce.

- The worship of Aesculapius is introduced from Epidaurus to Rome in the hope of ending a plague.

==== Greece ====
- The Boeotians revolted against Demetrius Poliorcetes, the King of Macedon. They received help from the Aetolians and the Spartans.

==== Persia ====
- When an invasion of nomads threatens the eastern possessions of his realm (i.e. between the Caspian Sea and the Aral Sea and the Indian Ocean), Seleucus hands over the government of these lands west of the Euphrates to his son Antiochus. Antiochus is appointed co-regent and commander-in-chief of these territories.

==== China ====
- The State of Qin, led by commander Bai Qi, wins a decisive victory over the States of Wei and Han in the Battle of Yique. He then captures territories in Han before invading and capturing further territories in Wei.
