= 296 BC =

296 BC in various calendars
- Gregorian calendar: 296 BC; CCXCVI BC
- Ab urbe condita: 458
- Ancient Egypt era: XXXIII dynasty, 28
- Pharaoh: Ptolemy I Soter, 28
- Ancient Greek Olympiad (summer): 121st Olympiad (victor)¹
- Assyrian calendar: 4455
- Balinese saka calendar: N/A
- Bengali calendar: −889 – −888
- Berber calendar: 655
- Buddhist calendar: 249
- Burmese calendar: −933
- Byzantine calendar: 5213–5214
- Chinese calendar: 甲子年 (Wood Rat); 2402 or 2195 — to — 乙丑年 (Wood Ox); 2403 or 2196
- Coptic calendar: −579 – −578
- Discordian calendar: 871
- Ethiopian calendar: −303 – −302
- Hebrew calendar: 3465–3466
- Hindu calendars
- Vikram Samvat: −239 – −238
- Shaka Samvat: N/A
- Kali Yuga: 2805–2806
- Holocene calendar: 9705
- Iranian calendar: 917 BP – 916 BP
- Islamic calendar: 945 BH – 944 BH
- Javanese calendar: N/A
- Julian calendar: N/A
- Korean calendar: 2038
- Minguo calendar: 2207 before ROC 民前2207年
- Nanakshahi calendar: −1763
- Seleucid era: 16/17 AG
- Thai solar calendar: 247–248
- Tibetan calendar: ཤིང་ཕོ་བྱི་བ་ལོ་ (male Wood-Rat) −169 or −550 or −1322 — to — ཤིང་མོ་གླང་ལོ་ (female Wood-Ox) −168 or −549 or −1321

Year 296 BC was a year of the pre-Julian Roman calendar. At the time it was known as the Year of the Consulship of Violens and Caecus (or, less frequently, year 458 Ab urbe condita). The denomination 296 BC for this year has been used since the early medieval period, when the Anno Domini calendar era became the prevalent method in Europe for naming years.

== Events ==
=== By place ===
==== Roman Republic ====
- Third Samnite War:

- The consul Lucius Volumnius Flamma Violens and the proconsuls Quintus Fabius Maximus Rullianus and Publius Decius Mus devastate the lands of Samnium.
- The Samnite noble Gellius Egnatius leads an army into Umbria and makes an alliance with the majority of the Etruscan city-states and some of the Umbrian cities.
- Following the departure of Gellius, the Romans in Samnium attack walled positions. Volumnius captures three forts, Decius captures the town of Murgantia, and Fabius captures the city of Romulea and the town of Ferentinum.
- The Samnite-Etruscan coalition campaigns against the consul Appius Claudius Caecus in Etruria and inflicts several defeats on the Romans.
- Volumnius orders Fabius to march into Lucania, where he stamps out pro-Samnite disturbances against the ruling class.
- Volumnius joins Appius in Etruria and they defeat the Samnite-Etruscan coalition in a battle, killing 6900 and capturing 2120.
- Volumnius launches a surprise attack against a Samnite column that had been raiding Campania. He frees 7400 Campanian prisoners, kills 6000 Samnites, and captures 2500 Samnites, including the general Statius Minacius and four military tribunes.
- Gellius has a powerful warband of Semnones reinforce the anti-Roman coalition, which is also joined by yet more cities of the Umbrians.

- The temple to Bellona is erected at the south end of the prata Flaminia, later the Circus Flaminius, in Rome.

==== Greece ====
- Ptolemy makes peace with Demetrius Poliorcetes, to whom he betrothes his daughter Ptolemais.
