= Privata =

Privata may refer to:

- Missa Privata, a mass said by a priest without music or incense
- Musica privata, see Musica reservata
- Vita privata, a 1962 French film directed by Louis Malle
- the feminine singular or neuter plural form of the Latin word privatus, a term of Roman law, "private" as distinguished from publicus, "public, belonging to the Roman people"
