= Sarcophagus of Lucius Cornelius Scipio Barbatus =

Monument in the Vatican Museum, Rome

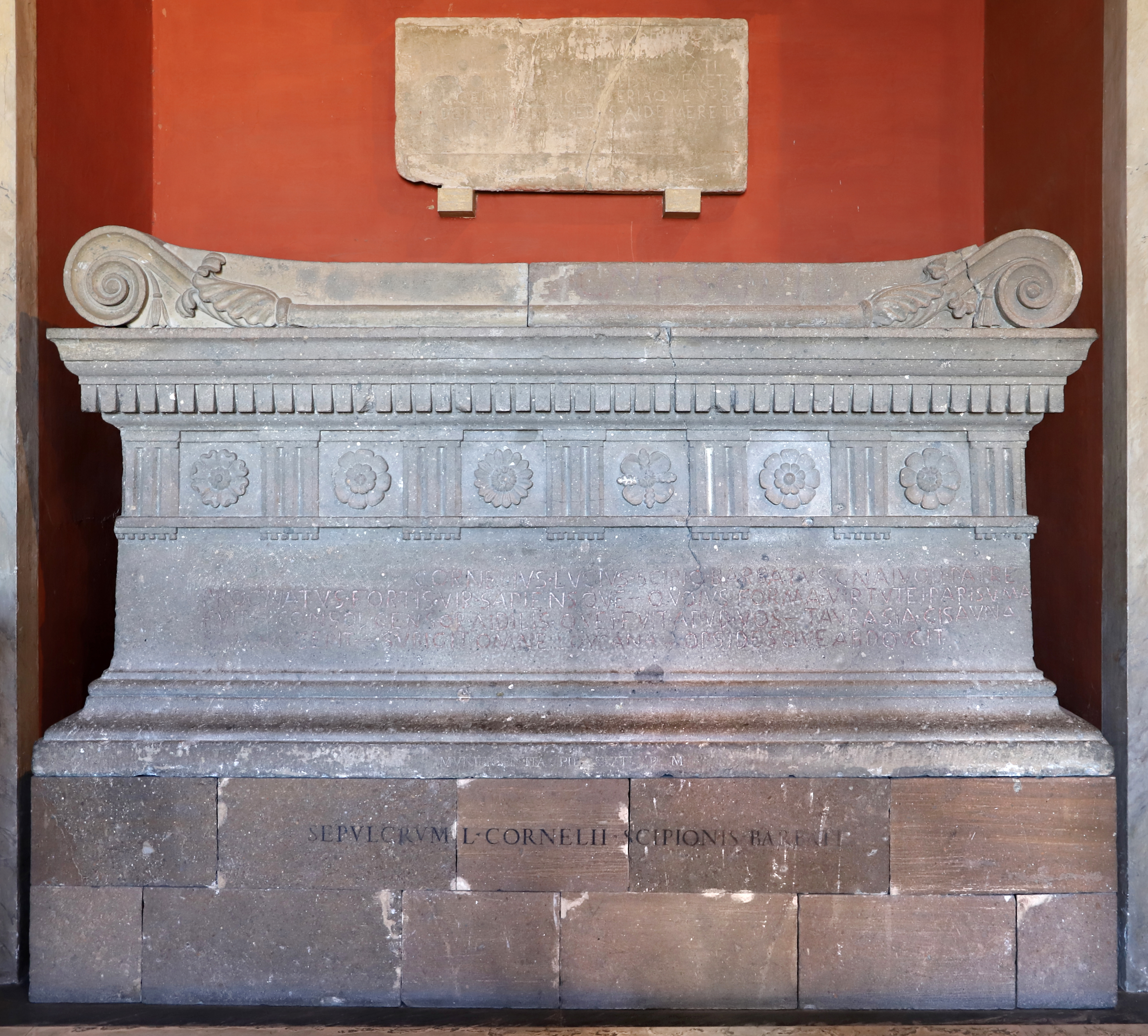
- Circa 280 BC; from the Tomb of the Scipios, Via Appia
- Year: c. 280 BC
- Medium: Peperino
- Location: Vatican Museums, Rome

The sarcophagus of Lucius Cornelius Scipio Barbatus, consul in 298 B.C., is a solid tuff burial coffin, once located in the Tomb of the Scipios. It is now found in the Vestibolo Quadrato of the Pio-Clementine Museum in the Vatican Museum complex.

The name is incised on the lid (CIL VI 1284) and the epitaph (CIL VI 1285) on the front of the only intact sarcophagus (some of the decorative detail has been restored). The letters were originally painted red. A Doric-style decorative panel is above the inscription featuring roses alternating with column-like triglyphs. The top of the sarcophagus is modeled as a cushion.

== Epitaph on Sarcophagus ==
His sarcophagus preserves his epitaph, written in Old Latin Saturnian meter:

CORNELIVS⸱LVCIVS⸱SCIPIO⸱BARBATVS⸱GNAIVOD⸱PATRE
PROGNATVS⸱FORTIS⸱VIR⸱SAPIENSQVE—
QVOIVS⸱FORMA⸱VIRTVTEI⸱PARISVMA
FVIT—CONSOL CENSOR⸱AIDILIS⸱QVEI⸱FVIT⸱APVD⸱VOS—TAVRASIA⸱CISAVNA
SAMNIO⸱CEPIT—SVBIGIT⸱OMNE⸱LOVCANA⸱OPSIDESQVE⸱ABDOVCIT

which has been stated in modern upper- and lower-case script as the verse:

Cornelius Lucius Scipio Barbatus Gnaivod Patre Prognatus
Fortis Vir Sapiensque
Quoius Forma Virtutei Parisuma Fuit
Consol Censor Aidilis Quei Fuit Apud Vos
Taurasia Cisauna Samnio Cepit
Subigit Omne Loucana Opsidesque Abdoucit.

and also transcribed in classical Latin as:

Cornelius Lucius Scipio Barbatus, Gnaeo patre
prognatus, fortis vir sapiensque, cuius forma virtuti parissima
fuit, Consul, Censor, Aedilis, qui fuit apud vos; Taurasiam Cisaunam,
Samnio cepit, subigit omnem Lucaniam, obsidesque abducit.

A translation is:

Cornelius Lucius Scipio Barbatus, sprung from Gnaeus his father, a man strong and wise, whose appearance was most in keeping with his virtue, who was consul, censor, and aedile among you – He captured Taurasia Cisauna in Samnium – he subdued all of Lucania and led off hostages.

There is a rough-hewn area above the epitaph, where it appears that some text has been erased. This has traditionally been interpreted as evidence of an earlier, shorter epitaph, which was replaced by the surviving text at a later date. More recently, however, a detailed analysis of the epitaph has suggested that the surviving text is the original inscription, but that the first part of the epitaph has been deleted. A summary of this analysis states:

The most compelling arguments that suggest the removal of part of the same verse text we now have relate to the shape and character of the erasure itself. In effect, a fine sarcophagus, which was inscribed with a long and carefully executed text, is marred by a rough erasure. If the erasure was made before the new text was cut, why was more trouble not taken to smooth and prepare the stone? Moreover, why does our text start at a distance of a third of a line from the margin? It would have been easy for the mason to produce a better surface so that he could have started at the margin. The whole execution of the inscription itself is very fine and clearly not the work of an amateur. The overall impression is that no expense was spared in the layout of a large tomb and the manufacture of a magnificent sarcophagus for its first occupant.

If a short, earlier text had indeed been inscribed, there would have been no reason to write it in small letters at the very top of the ample space available on the front of the sarcophagus. It would surely have been placed more in the middle and in larger letters... Barbatus’ erasure suggests that the letters were the same size and the lines the same length as the extant text. The erasure comprises exactly the length of two of the Saturnian verses below. All these considerations strongly suggest that part of this same text was erased.
The question remains as to what was erased by a later family member... Whatever was rubbed out must have been controversial or unsatisfactory from the family’s point of view

Since the tomb was closed in the late Republic, the erasure must date to the middle Republic, and since the tombs were private, the erasure must have been done at the request of an authoritative male family member. In her review of the epitaph, Harriet Flower notes that "The Scipios are also known for their continued search for earlier ancestors. This was done partly by invention and partly by substitution of the cognomen Scipio for earlier ones of branches that later died out... It is possible, therefore, that Barbatus'...[epitaph contained some claim to be the first Scipio, and that this]...became an obstacle to later family members who were eager to find earlier ancestors and other founders, who could compete with the claims of rival families. Such a reconstruction, while it can not be proved, is at least plausible and in accord with the other available evidence."

== Contents ==
The bones of Barbatus, along with a gold signet ring taken from his finger bone, were removed from the sepulcher in the excavations of 1780 and initially went to the Vatican along with everything else of value in the tomb. Pope Pius VI gave the bones to a Venetian Senator, Angelo Quirini, who re-interred them in an elaborate sepulcher in the gardens of his villa near Padua. The gardens were later destroyed, and the fate of the bones is unknown. The gold ring was given by Pius IV to a French scholar, Louis Dutens, who later sold it to the Earl of Beverley. By the late 19th century it had found its way into the collection of the Dukes of Northumberland at Alnwick Castle. The classicist Mary Beard confirmed in 2015 that it was still in the collection, which makes it the only ancient Roman ring which can be traced to an original owner.
