= Battle of Camerinum =

298 BC battle during the Third Samnite War

- Part of the Samnite Wars
Date	298 BC
Location	Camerinum (modern Camerino), Italy 43°08′25″N 13°04′08″E
Result	Samnite victory

Belligerents
Roman Republic	Samnium

Commanders and leaders
Lucius Cornelius Scipio Barbatus	Gellius Egnatius

Strength
One legion	Unknown
- Location within Italy

The Battle of Camerinum in 298 BC took place during the Third Samnite War. In the battle, the Samnites defeated a Roman legion under the command of the propraetor Lucius Cornelius Scipio Barbatus.
