= Gnaeus Fulvius Maximus Centumalus =

Roman general and politician

Consul of the Roman Republic
- In office January 298 BC – December 298 BC Serving with Lucius Cornelius Scipio Barbatus
- Preceded by: Marcus Fulvius Paetinus and Titus Manlius Torquatus
- Succeeded by: Fabius Maximus Rullianus and Publius Decius Mus

Dictator of Rome in 263 BC

Personal details
- Born: c. 340 BC
- Died: c. 260 BC

Military service
- Allegiance: Roman Empire
- Battles/wars: Third Samnite War; First Punic War

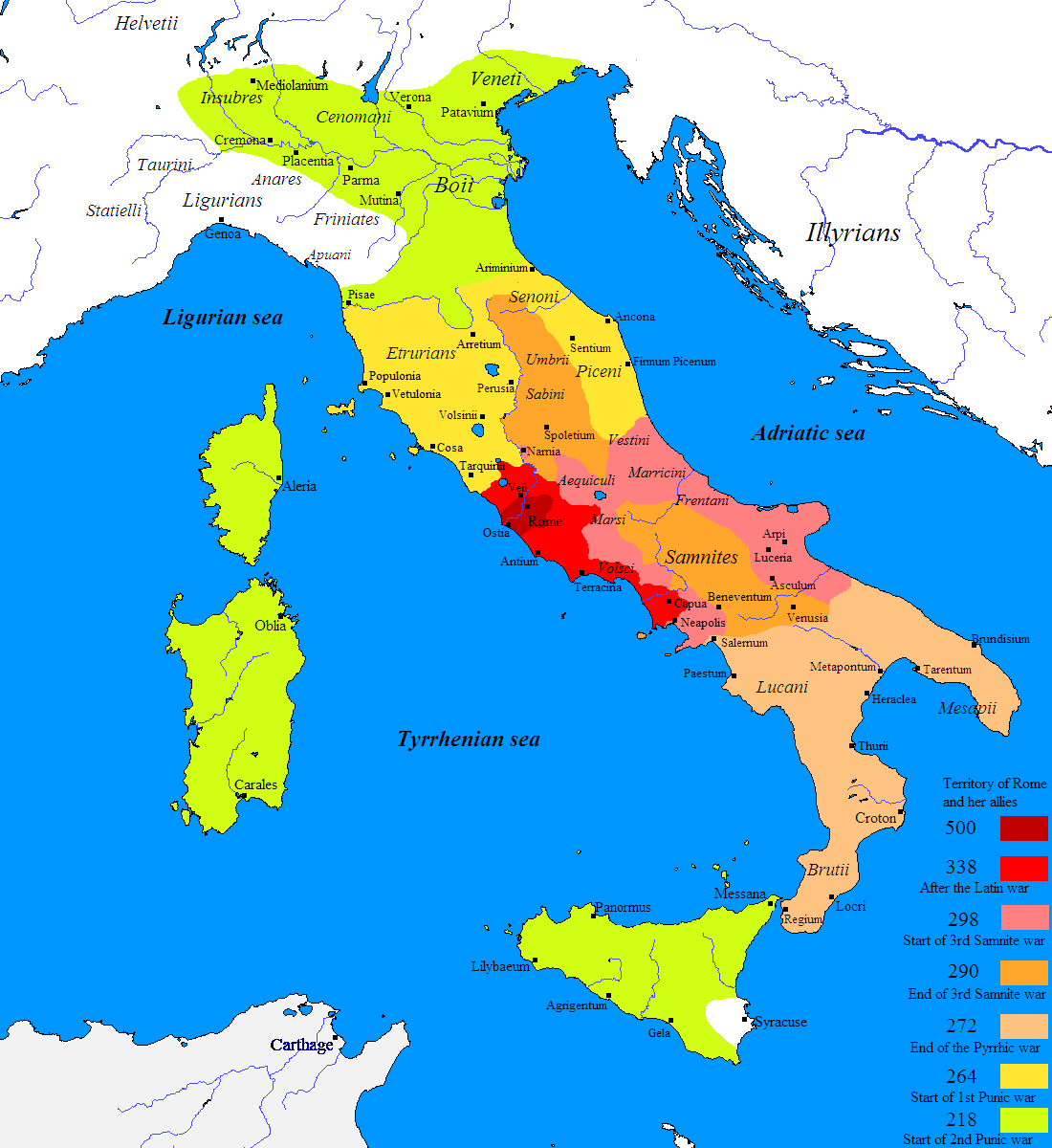
The Roman expansion in Italy. At the time of Centumalus, Rome controlled the territories shown in red, pink and dark brown.

Gnaeus Fulvius Maximus Centumalus (c. 340 – c. 260 BC) was a military commander and politician from the middle period of the Roman Republic, who became consul in 298 BC. He fought in the final wars against the Etruscans and later led armies in the Third Samnite War. He was appointed dictator in 263 BC with responsibility for overseeing the start of the Roman ship building effort in the First Punic War.

== Career ==
A member of the plebeian, or lower class, gens Fulvia, Centumalus is first mentioned in 302 BC as serving as a legate, an army commander, under the dictator Marcus Valerius Corvus in the war against the Etruscans.

Elected consul in 298 BC, he and his colleague Lucius Cornelius Scipio Barbatus were dispatched to deal with the Samnites following the outbreak of the Third Samnite War. The accounts of that year's fighting, however, are contradictory. According to Livy, while Scipio was dispatched northward to battle the Etruscans, Fulvius was sent south to fight on the Samnite front. He defeated a Samnite army outside of Bovianum, after which he advanced to the town and captured it after a short siege. Centumalus followed this up with the capture of the town of Aufidena. Returning to Rome, the Senate awarded him a triumph. However, the Fasti Triumphales have him awarded triumphs for victories in both Samnium and Etruria, while Frontinus states he was fighting at Lucania. To complicate matters further, his colleague Scipio's epitaph states that it was Scipio who won victories in Samnium, most likely during this year. According to the historian S. P. Oakley, Livy was probably confused about the theatre of war, and it was in fact Centumalus who won victories against the Sabines.

In 295 BC, with the war still raging, Centumalus was one of a number of former consuls who were appointed propraetors, occupying the position as a privatus (a private citizen, or non-magistrate), and placed in charge of various armies. Centumalus and his legion were stationed on Faliscan territory, with orders to defend the passage along the Tiber River, and to keep communication lines open between the offensive armies and the capital. Problems in the field caused the consuls to issue orders to Centumalus to march with Lucius Postumius Megellus on Clusium as a tactic to force the Etruscans to withdraw their forces from Sentinum. While Megellus was sent back to Rome, Centumalus invaded Etruria and proceeded to ravage the land. When the towns of Clusium and Perusia sent out an army to put a stop to his destructive tactics, he swiftly defeated their combined forces. After this, and a Roman victory at the decisive Battle of Sentinum, Centumalus was recalled to Rome where his army was disbanded.

The final mention of Centumalus was his appointment in 263 BC as dictator. A dictator was given the full authority of the state for a limited period in order to deal with a military emergency or to undertake a specific duty. This was just after the outbreak of the First Punic War, and his task was to mobilise the resources of the state to bring about the creation of a navy, which the Romans would need to successfully take the war to Carthage.

Political offices
Preceded by Marcus Fulvius Paetinus and Titus Manlius Torquatus (Suffect: Marcus Valerius Corvus)	Consul of the Roman Republic with Lucius Cornelius Scipio Barbatus; 298 BC	Succeeded by Fabius Maximus Rullianus and Publius Decius Mus
Preceded by Gnaeus Domitius Ahenobarbus (280 BC)	Dictator of the Roman Republic; 263 BC	Succeeded by Quintus Ogulnius Gallus (257 BC)
