= Verginia (wife of Lucius Volumnius Flamma) =

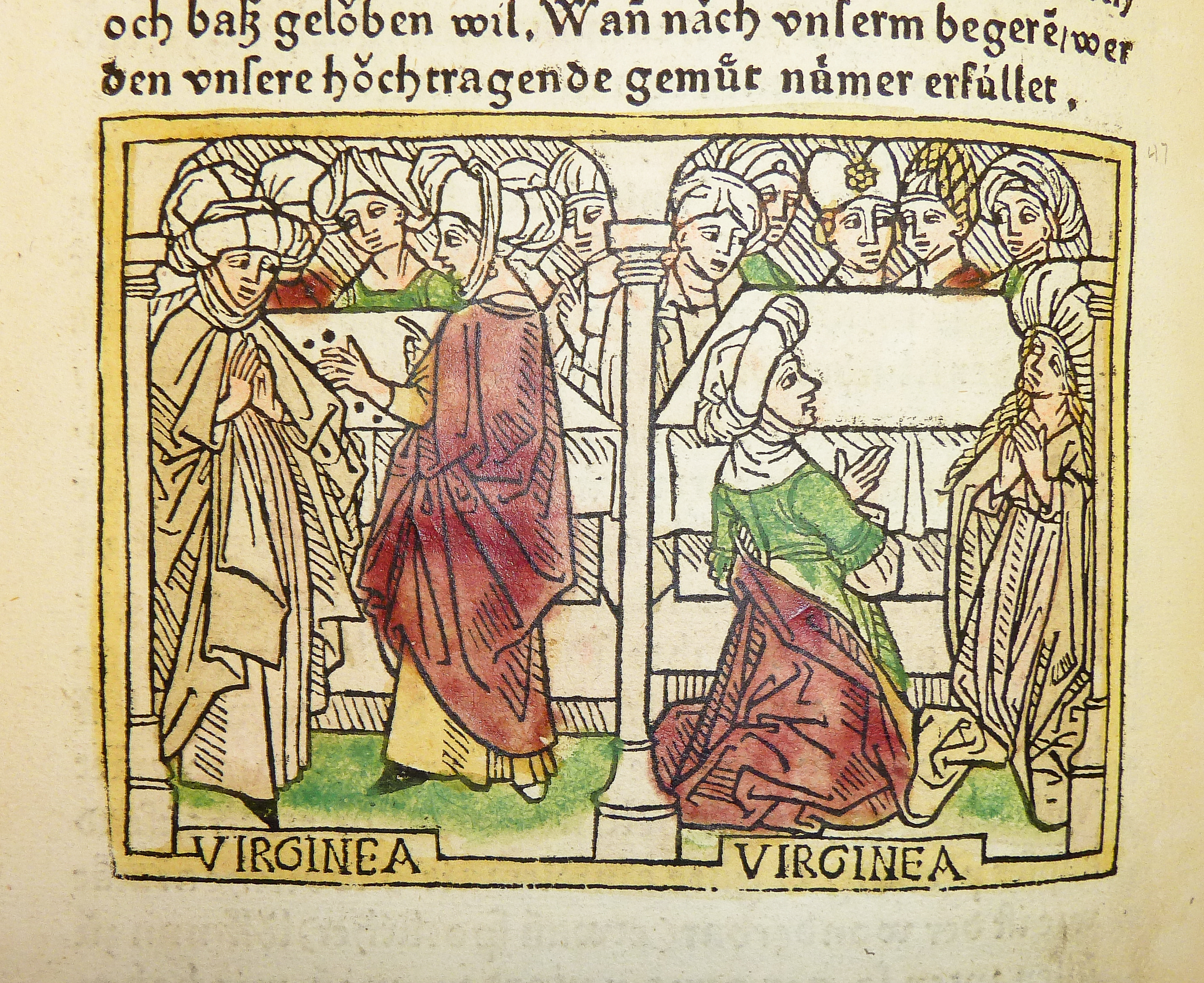
Woodcut illustration of Verginia

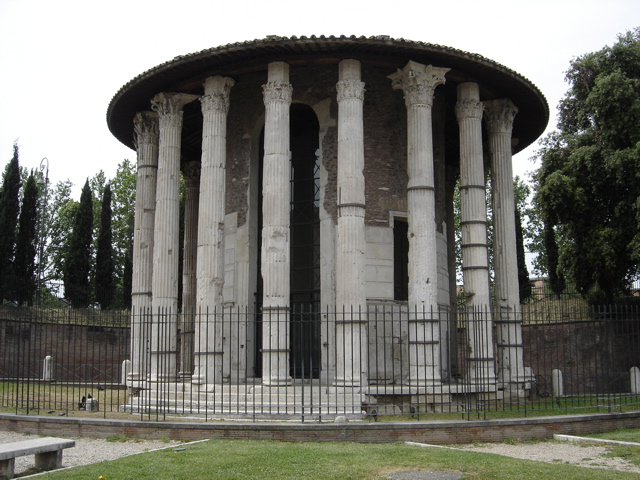
Temple of Hercules

Verginia, sometimes spelled Virginia, was the daughter of Aulus Verginius, a Roman patrician. Her example of modesty and virtue in the face of adversity became famous in antiquity, and during the Middle Ages, she was celebrated as one of Boccaccio's Famous Women.

== Biography ==
In 296 BC, Verginia married Lucius Volumnius Flamma, a plebeian who had held the consulship the previous year. Subsequently the leading patrician matrons prevented her from attending the sacred rights of Pudicitia, the goddess of modesty, arguing that she had dishonoured her family by marrying a plebeian. She was removed from the temple, (Note: The temple of Pudicitia is a chapel in the Forum Boarium, built up against the round temple of Hercules.) which was then barred to her and other women in similar circumstances.

Verginia protested she had entered the Temple of Pudicitia in good faith, and as a pure woman. Because she was refused entry to the temple, she dedicated a portion of her own house, in the Vicus Longus, as a shrine to Pudicitia, and invited the plebeian women to join her there to celebrate the rites of the goddess:

I am dedicating this shrine to the Plebeian Pudicitia and invite you each to compete in a wifely modesty as the men in this City. I beg the patrician women to show the same spirit of emulation on the score of chastity that the men display with regard to courage and valor, so that this shrine may, if possible, have the reputation of being honored with a holier observance manner and by purer worshippers than that of the patrician women.

== See also ==
- Verginia gens
