= Lucius Cornelius Scipio Barbatus =

Roman general and statesman

- Died: 270 BC
- Known for: Third Samnite War
- Office: Consul of Rome (298 BCE)
- Children: Lucius Cornelius Scipio and Gnaeus Cornelius Scipio Asina
- Relatives: great-grandfather of Scipio Africanus

Military service
- Allegiance: Roman Republic
- Branch/service: Roman army
- Battles/wars: Third Samnite War; Battle of Volterrae; Battle of Tifernum; Battle of Aquilonia

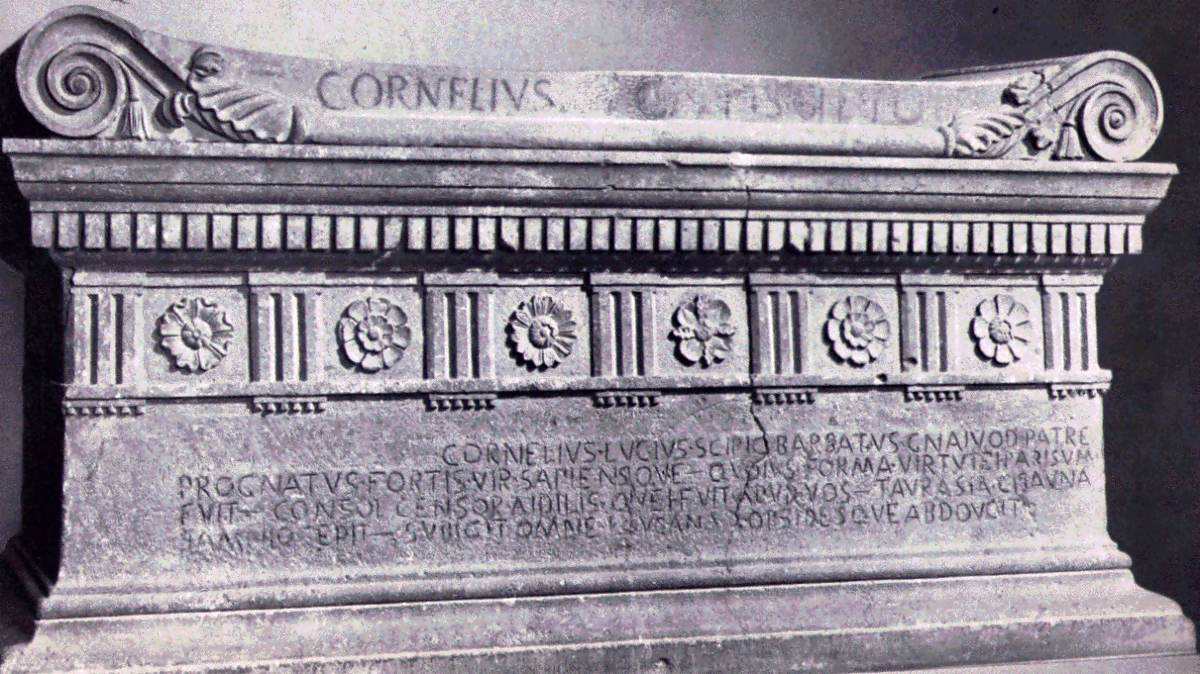
The Sarcophagus of Lucius Cornelius Scipio Barbatus, erected around 270 BC, contains an Old Latin elogium in Saturnian metre.

Lucius Cornelius Scipio Barbatus (c. 337 BC – 270 BC) was one of the two elected Roman consuls in 298 BC. He led the Roman army to victory against the Etruscans near Volterra. A member of the noble Roman family of Scipiones, he was the father of Lucius Cornelius Scipio and Gnaeus Cornelius Scipio Asina and great-grandfather of Scipio Africanus.

== General of the third Samnite war ==
Barbatus rose to preeminence as a patrician officer of the Roman Republic during the crucial period of the Third Samnite War, when Rome finally defeated a coalition of their neighbors: the Etruscans, the Umbrians, the Samnites, and their allies, the Gauls. The victory extended Rome's leadership and sovereignty over most of Italy.

=== Battle of Volterrae, 298 BC ===
Prior to 298 BC war had already broken out between Rome and Etruria when the Etruscans decided to invade Rome in combination with some Gallic allies they had purchased. The planned attack was a violation of a former treaty with Rome. The Gauls reneged and the Etruscans found themselves facing a Roman army under consul Titus Manlius who however died after a fall from his horse in a display of horsemanship. The election held to replace him made Marcus Valerius Corvus consul. He joined the army in Etruria and began to waste the country hoping to provoke the Etruscans to battle, which they refused.

In 298 BC Appius Claudius followed by Publius Sulpicius became interreges for reasons unknown. Sulpicius held an election, which brought Barbatus and Gnaeus Fulvius Maximus Centumatus into consular office. The Lucanians spoke before the Senate saying that the Samnites were devastating their country and asking for the protection of Rome in exchange for a treaty and hostages. The Senate assented after a few moments' deliberation and dispatched heralds to tell the Samnites to withdraw. Encountering the Samnite army they were told that if they spoke in Samnium they would never leave there alive; consequently, the Senate declared war on Samnium. In a casting of lots as to which consul would take which war Barbatus won command of the army in Etruria while Centumatus undertook the initial campaign in the Third Samnite War.

The Etruscans attacked immediately before Volterra. A day-long battle brought no victory but in the night the Etruscans withdrew to their fortified cities leaving their camp and equipment to the Romans. Encamping his army at the Etrurian border Barbatus led a lightly armed force in the devastation of the countryside.

=== Battle of Tifernum, 297 BC ===
In the next year the Etruscans sued for peace. The newly elected consuls for 297 BC, Fabius Rullianus and Decius Mus led both armies against Samnium, Barbatus going as lieutenant general (legatus) under Maximus. As they advanced into Samnium laying waste to the country the Samnites were hoping to catch them in an ambush in a valley at Tifernum (Samniticum). (Note: Of the three settlements of ancient Italy named Tifernum, two were in Umbria, while the third, of location unknown exactly, is believed to have been at the source of the Tifernum (Biferno) river at the foot of Mount Tifernus (Matese Mountain), a Samnite stronghold. Cramer, John Anthony (1826). A Geographical and Historical Description of Ancient Italy: With a Map and a Plan of Rome. Clarendon Press. p. 231.) Stationing a force there to entice the Romans they hid their main force in the hills behind. Fabius saw through the ruse and brought his army up in quadrangular formation before the "hiding place" of the Samnites, who then came down to fight a conventional battle, line-to-line.

Unable to obtain a victory, Fabius withdrew the spearmen of the First Legion from the line and sent them under the command of Barbatus stealthily around the enemy flank into the hills behind, whence the latter had earlier descended. They were ordered to coordinate an attack from behind with an especially vigorous cavalry charge to the front of the Samnite line. The plan went entirely wrong: the charge came too soon and was repulsed. A counterattack was beginning to break the Roman line when Barbatus' men appeared on the hills and were mistaken for the second Roman army under Mus, a disaster for the Samnites if true. They abandoned the field posthaste leaving behind 23 standards and 3400 slain, while 830 were taken prisoner. In fact Publius Decius Mus was far away in south Samnium.

=== Campaigns under Claudius and Flamma, 296 BC ===
Having routed the Samnite army both consuls proceeded to the systematic reduction of Samnium over a period of five months until the next election. Mus travelled over the country conducting operations from 45 camps successively while Maximus utilized 86. After elections the new consuls ordered them to continue the war in Samnium for six months, each with the rank of proconsul. The Samnite army under Gellius Egnatius, unable to remain in Samnium, offered its services to Etruria, which were accepted; under Egnatius' leadership the Umbrians were brought in and Gallic mercenaries were hired. Calling a meeting of all the chief men in Etruria Egnatius declared that war for freedom was better than peace with servitude and announced his intention to attack Rome. The Etruscans assented.

Receiving intelligence of the new dangerous circumstances the Senate dispatched Appius Claudius into Etruria in command of the First and Fourth Legions and 12,000 allied troops. Several inconclusive engagements were fought. The second consul for 296, Lucius Volumnius, was assisting the two proconsuls in the reduction of Samnium when the Lucanians defected, influenced by an appeal from the ordinary people of Samnium. Flamma claimed to have received a letter from Claudius asking for military assistance, a claim which was later denied by Claudius. Sending Maximus (presumably still with Barbatus) to the reduction of Lucania he departed for Etruria.

Claudius was ill-pleased to see him and had ordered him away when all the officers of his own army met to insist that he be retained. The men took a voice vote of such magnitude that it alarmed the nearby enemy camp and they prepared for battle. The Romans went out to fight immediately, with Claudius giving in to a situation he had to accept. The Romans attacked so fiercely with Claudius, it is said, fighting in the front ranks along with the men and continually invoking the goddess of war, Bellona, with hands upraised to heaven, that they routed the combined enemy force and drove them from their camp, killing 7300 and taking 2120 prisoners. (Note: Livy does not name the battle or give its location within Etruria.)

Meanwhile, the reduced forces of Maximus and Mus failed to restrain the Samnites, who raised another army with which they invaded and plundered Campania. Arriving there by forced marches Flamma learned that the Samnite army was encamped at the river Volturnus on its way back to Samnium. In the Battle of the Volturnus of 296 BC Flamma's army waited in ambush outside the gates of the Samnite camp. Flamma had sent in native spies the night before, who ascertained that the Samnites would make a dawn march. At dawn Flamma allowed part of the Samnite army to march out, splitting their forces, before he launched an attack that had such a momentum it was soon being fought in the camp. 7400 Roman prisoners taken previously by the Samnites freed themselves and joined in the fighting. At the end of the day the Romans had killed 6,000, taken 2,500 prisoners including four military tribunes and the commander, Statius Minacius, and captured 30 standards. They redistributed the Samnite booty to claimants and gave the unclaimed property to the soldiers. Samnite hopes in the south had been thwarted. News was received at Rome however that Gellius Egnatius had raised another army in the north consisting of Samnites, Etruscans, Umbrians and Gauls. The Senate, in a mood of despair, prepared to mobilize the last of the Roman forces. They ordered a draft of all males, including adolescents, the elderly and the sons of freedmen. For the first time they began to debate the permanent depopulation of Samnium (a measure that was never carried out).

=== The turning point, 295 BC ===
The elections of 295 BC were now upon the city. Flamma was recalled to conduct them. Maximus and Mus were elected, with Appius Claudius in the office of praetor. Maximus insisted on commanding in Etruria without the casting of lots that normally apportioned duties to consuls and after an intense public debate the Senate granted his request. He proceeded to Etruria, relieved Claudius of his command and sent him home on the grounds that he was a do-nothing commander who had allowed his men to sit in camp without even the exercise of marches for patrols and training. Thanks to Claudius, Maximus was soon recalled to account for his conduct of the Etrurian campaign and receive any further orders. Barbatus suddenly appears again in the account, indicating that he had been under Maximus' command all along. Maximus assigns Barbatus as propraetor of the Second Legion stationed temporarily at Clusium. He then departs for Rome.

== Patrician censor ==
At the time of his death Barbatus was the patrician censor of 280 BC. His censorate is notable because it is the first one of which there is a reliable record, though the position was quite old by that time.

== Sarcophagus and Epitaph ==
The Sarcophagus of Lucius Cornelius Scipio Barbatus was discovered in the Tomb of the Scipios (the only one to survive complete there), and is now in the Vatican Museums. It preserves his epitaph, written in Old Latin Saturnian meter (for translation see article on Saturnian meter).

== See also ==
- Scipio-Paullus-Gracchus family tree

== Bibliography ==
- Ramsay, William (1859). A Manual of Latin Prosody (2 ed.). London and Glasgow: Richard Griffin and Company.

Political offices
Preceded by Marcus Fulvius Paetinus; Titus Manlius Torquatus; Marcus Valerius Corvus	Roman consul 298 BC with Gnaeus Fulvius Maximus Centumalus	Succeeded by Quintus Fabius Maximus Rullianus; Publius Decius Mus
