= Silva Ciminia =

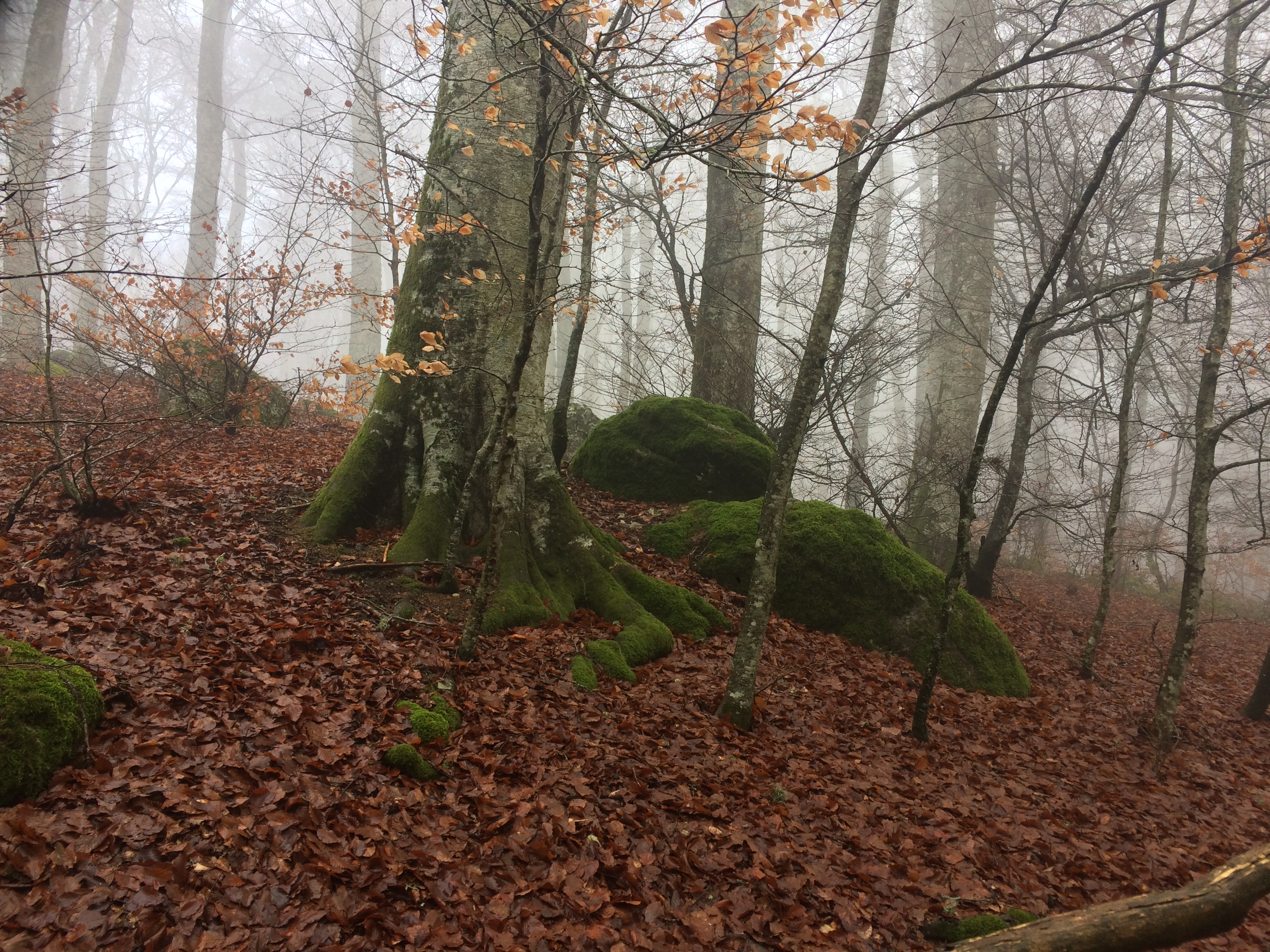
Beech trees on Monte Cimino

The Silva Ciminia, the Ciminian Forest, was the unbroken primeval forest that separated Ancient Rome from Etruria. According to the Roman historian Livy it was, in the 4th century BCE, a feared, pathless wilderness in which few dared tread.

== History ==
The Ciminian Forest received its name from the Monti Cimini, which are still a densely wooded range of volcanic hills northwest of Rome. They form the part of the forerange of the Apennine main range that faces towards the Tyrrhenian Sea.

In the south, the Silva Ciminia stretched from Lake Bracciano to the edges of the flat plain of the Roman Campagna, in the lower Tiber Valley. Stretches of cleared fields round the major Etruscan settlements formed the Ager Veientanus that supported Veii, the Ager Faliscus of the Falisci, and the Ager Capenas of Capena. In the heart of the Ciminian woodlands lay the Ciminus Lake (Lago di Vico). In the northwest, they reached as far as Tarquinia.

The forest was predominantly formed by oak and beech, though second growth in the lower slopes has favoured the aggressively re-seeding Spanish chestnut. A relict stand of beech, rare in Central Italy, remains on the upper slopes of Monte Cimino. Sub-fossil pollen analyses from cores of stratified sediment taken in the region's crater lakes typically reveal a pollen sequence characteristic of tundra lying over an all-but-sterile wind-blown loess sand; this in turn was followed by grassland, with pollen of water-lilies and pondweeds blown from glacial meltwater lakes. The earliest Holocene forest was fir, followed by mixed pine and oak, with a climax forest of beech and oak, including Quercus ilex.

The surface profiles have been transformed since the region was first deforested in Roman times, as settlers worked outwards from strips flanking the Roman roads — the via Cassia, the via Amerina and the via Flaminia — which had been struck through the forest. In the deforested slopes, streams with even moderate flow have cut deeply eroded gullies and valleys in the geologically very recent soft tuff and volcanic ash. A sudden increase in organic sediments in strata corresponding to the third century BCE records this erosion following agrarian deforestation, which, far downstream, would initiate the Tiber's delta. Thereafter the palynological record attests many cultivated plants, and, significantly, nettles, the weed of disturbed, untended corners that follows temperate agriculture everywhere. By the third and fourth centuries CE very little of the primeval forest survived.

To the Romans of the Republic, the forest was as much feared as the trackless Hercynian Forest would be when they encountered that. In 310 BCE the Roman Senate, even after the rout of the Etruscans at Sutrium, charged the consul Fabius Maximus Rullianus not to enter this woodland in pursuit of the Etruscans, and when it emerged that he had done so, all Rome was struck with terror. The Silva formed a natural barrier between Ancient Rome and Etruria.
