= Battle of Sentinum =

Battle of the Third Samnite War (295 BC)

- Part of the Samnite Wars
Date	295 BC
Location	Sentinum (now near Sassoferrato, Marche, Italy) 43°24′57″N 12°51′16″E
Result	Roman victory

Belligerents
Roman Republic	Samnites; Senone Gauls; Etruscans; Umbrians

Commanders and leaders
Publius Decius Mus †; Fabius Maximus Rullianus	Gellius Egnatius †

Strength
4 legions (18,000–24,000 Romans) c. 20,000 allied troops Total: c. 40,000 men	Total: Nearly 80,000 men Participated in Battle: c. 40,000 men

Casualties and losses
8,700 killed	25,000 killed 8,000 captured

The Battle of Sentinum was the decisive battle of the Third Samnite War, fought in 295 BC near Sentinum (next to the modern town of Sassoferrato, in the Marches region of Italy), in which the Romans overcame a formidable coalition of Samnites, Etruscans, Umbrians, and Senone Gauls. The Romans won a decisive victory that broke up the tribal coalition (the Etruscans, Umbrians, and Senones pulled out of the war) and paved the way for the Romans' complete victory over the Samnites. The Romans involved in the battle of Sentinum were commanded by consuls Publius Decius Mus and Quintus Fabius Maximus Rullianus.

== Background ==
The Third Samnite War started when envoys from Lucania asked Rome for help against an attack on them by the Samnites. Rome intervened and the war started. Just prior to and during the first year of this, Rome was also facing a war with the Etruscans. In 297 BC the Romans received news that the Etruscans were considering suing for peace. As a result, both Roman consuls marched on Samnium and concentrated their operations there. Quintus Fabius defeated the Samnites at the Battle of Tifernum and Publius Decius defeated a Samnite force from Apulia near Maleventum. The two consuls then spent four months ravaging Samnium. Fabius also seized Cimetra (location unknown).

In 296 BC Quintus Fabius and Publius Decius were made proconsuls and were given a six-month extension of their military command to carry on the war in Samnium. Publius Decius ravaged Samnium until he drove the Samnite army outside its territory. The Samnite army headed north to Etruria to back up previous calls for an alliance with the Etruscans that had been turned down. Gellius Egnatius, a Samnite commander, insisted on the Etruscan council being convened. Most Etruscan city-states voted for a joint war. Umbrian groups near Etruria also joined in and there were attempts to hire Gallic mercenaries.

The consul Appius Claudius Caecus set off for Etruria with two legions and 15,000 allied troops. The other consul, Lucius Volumnius Flamma Violens, had already left for Samnium with two legions and 12,000 allies. Appius Claudius suffered some setbacks so Lucius Volumnius went to Etruria to help. The two consuls together defeated the Etruscans and Lucius Volumnius returned to Samnium as their appointments as proconsulships were about to expire. Meanwhile, the Samnites raised new troops and raided Roman territories and allies in Campania. Volumnius repelled the raids. However, the raids alarmed Rome because of news that the Etruscans were arming themselves and had invited the Samnites (under Gellius Egnatius) and the Umbrians to join them in a major revolt against the Romans. There were also reports that large sums of money were being offered to the Gauls followed by reports of an actual coalition between these four peoples and that there was "a huge army of Gauls."

It was the first time that Rome had to confront such a large coalition of forces. The two best military commanders, Quintus Fabius Maximus Rullianus and Publius Decius Mus, were elected as consuls again (for 295 BC). They took on the war in Etruria with four legions and a large body of allied infantry and cavalry (1,000 Campanian soldiers are mentioned), 40,000 men in total. The allies fielded an even larger army. Lucius Volumnius' command was prolonged for a year to continue the war in Samnium with two legions. Livy thought that his going there with such a big force must have been part of a diversionary strategy to force the Samnites to respond to Roman raids in Samnium and limit their troop deployment in Etruria. Two reserve contingents headed by propraetors were stationed in the Faliscan district and near the Vatican Hill to protect Rome.

The Etruscans, Samnites, and Umbrians crossed the Apennine Mountains and approached Sentinum. Their plan was for the Samnites and Senones to engage the Romans and for the Etruscans and Umbrians to take the Roman camp during the battle. Deserters from Clusium informed Quintus Fabius about this plan. The consul ordered the legions in Falerii and the Vatican to march to Clusium and ravage its territory as another diversionary strategy. This succeeded in drawing the Etruscans away from Sentinum to defend their land. Livy thought that with their departure the two enemy forces were so evenly matched that if the Etruscans and Umbrians had been present it would have been a disaster for the Romans. The propraetor Gnaeus Fulvius defeated the Etruscans. Perusia and Clusium lost up to 3,000 men.

== Battle ==
The two armies arrived at the plain of Sentinum, but waited for two days to do battle. Finally, unable to control the eagerness of their troops, the Romans attacked. The Senones stood on the right and the Samnites on the left. On the Roman side Quintus Fabius commanded the right and Publius Decius the left.

Quintus Fabius fought defensively to make the battle a test of endurance and wait for the enemy to flag. Publius Decius fought more aggressively and ordered a cavalry charge, which drove back the Senone cavalry twice. During the second charge they reached the enemy infantry, but were counter-charged by the Senone chariots and were routed. The line of Decius’ infantry was broken by the chariots and the Senone foot.

Publius Decius decided to perform the devotio, offering prayers to the gods and launching himself into the enemy lines, effectively sacrificing himself when his troops were in dire straits, just as his father had done at the Battle of Vesuvius in 340 BC. This act galvanised the Roman left who were joined by two reserve contingents which Quintus Fabius had called in to help.

On the right, Quintus Fabius directed the cavalry to outflank the Samnite wing and attack it in the flank and ordered his infantry to push forward. He then called in the other reserves. The Samnites broke and fled past the Senone line. The Senones formed a testudo with their shields at the front and top. Quintus Fabius ordered 500 Campanian lancers to attack them in the rear, combined with attacks by the middle line of one of the legions and by other cavalry units. Meanwhile, Quintus Fabius and the rest of the army took the Samnite camp by storm and cut off the line of retreat of the Senones. The Senones were defeated, losing 20,000 men according to Livy, while the Romans lost 8,700 men.

== Aftermath ==
Livy noted that some writers (whose work is lost) exaggerated the size of the battle, saying that the Umbrians also took part which gave the enemy an infantry of 60,000, a cavalry of 40,000 and 1,000 chariots and claiming that Lucius Volumnius and his two legions also fought in the battle. Livy said that Lucius Volumnius, instead, was holding the front in Samnium and routed a Samnite force near Mount Tifernus. After the battle, 5,000 Samnites made their way back home from Sentinum through the land of the Paeligni. The locals attacked them and killed 1,000 men. Quintus Fabius left Publius Decius’ army to guard Etruria and went to Rome to celebrate a triumph. In Etruria, the Perusini continued the war. Appius Claudius was sent to head Publius Decius’ army as propraetor and Quintus Fabius confronted and defeated the Perusini. The Samnites attacked the areas around the River Liris (at Formiae and Vescia), and the River Volturnus. They were pursued by Appius Claudius and Lucius Volumnius. They joined their forces and defeated them near Caiatia, near Capua.

Rome's victory broke up the coalition it had defeated. The Etruscans, Umbrians and Senone Gauls pulled out of the war. The Samnites, besides losing their allies, suffered heavy casualties. The Romans went on to win other battles against the Samnites. In the final stage of the war, which ended five years later, the Romans devastated Samnium and the Samnites capitulated. Rome gained control over much of central Italy and part of southern Italy.

== Bibliography ==
Livy, Rome's Italian Wars: Books 6-10 (Oxford's World's Classics). Oxford University Press, 2013, ISBN 978-0199564859

Scullard, H.H. A History of the Roman World 753–146.
