= Battle of Tifernum =

297 BC battle of the Third Samnite War

- Part of the Samnite Wars
Date	297 BC
Location	Castropignano, Molise, Italy
Result	Roman victory

Belligerents
Roman Republic	Samnium

Commanders and leaders
Fabius Maximus Rullianus; Scipio Barbatus	

Strength
20,000	25,000

Casualties and losses
2,000 dead	3,400 dead, 830 captured

The Battle of Tifernum (297 BC) was an important battle of the Third Samnite War, fought in 297 BC near Castropignano, either on the banks of the river Biferno (Latin: Tifernus) or near the Matese mountains (Latin: Tifernus Mons) in the province of Campobasso, in what is now southern Italy, where the Romans overcame a determined Samnite army. The result would lead to the decisive Battle of Sentinum, which granted Rome the domination of central Italy.

== Background ==
The Third Samnite War broke out over territory near Naples in 298 BC, as the last Samnite attempt to ward off Roman domination. Rome sent two armies against Samnium, led by the experienced consuls Quintus Fabius Maximus Rullianus and Publius Decius Mus, each with about 20,000 men. The Samnite army numbered 25,000. The Samnites hoped to defeat each Roman army in detail; therefore, they set an ambush for Rullianus in a valley near 'Tifernum' (Livy here probably intended to use the term Tifernus instead). Rullianus, with proper scouting, discovered the trap and would not enter the valley. Fearing the arrival of the other Roman army if they delayed, the Samnites came out of the valley and offered battle, which Rullianus duly accepted.

The battle lines clashed and the Samnites were getting the upper hand when, suddenly, in the Samnite rear, there appeared a force of Roman hastati, led by the Tribune Lucius Cornelius Scipio Barbatus, that Rullianus had previously sent on a flanking march before the battle had begun. With both sides thinking this small detachment heralded the arrival of the army of Decius Mus, the Roman morale soared while that of the Samnites collapsed, and they fled the battle. The badly shaken Romans were in no shape to pursue, and so, with Samnite casualties fairly low, the Samnites were still in shape to continue the war.

== Battle details ==
The newly elected consuls for 297 BC, Quintus Fabius Maximus and Decius Mus, led both armies against Samnium, Barbatus going as lieutenant general (legatus) under Maximus. As they advanced into Samnium, laying waste to the country, the Samnites were hoping to catch them in an ambush in a valley near Tifernum. Stationing a force there to entice the Romans, they hid their main force in the hills behind. Fabius saw through the ruse and brought his army up in quadrangular formation before the "hiding place" of the Samnites, who then came down to fight a conventional battle, line-to-line.

Unable to obtain a victory, Fabius withdrew the spearmen of the First Legion from the line and sent them under the command of Barbatus stealthily around the enemy flank into the hills behind, whence the latter had earlier descended. They were ordered to coordinate an attack from behind with an especially vigorous cavalry charge to the front of the Samnite line. The plan went entirely wrong: the charge came too soon and was repulsed. A counterattack was beginning to break the Roman line when Barbatus' men appeared on the hills and were mistaken for the second Roman army under Mus, a disaster for the Samnites if true. They abandoned the field posthaste, leaving behind 23 stranded and 3,400 slain, while 830 were taken prisoner. In fact, Publius Decius Mus was far away in southern Samnium.
