= Promagistrate =

Ancient Roman office

In ancient Rome, a promagistrate (Latin: pro magistratu) was a person who was granted the power via prorogation to act in place of an ordinary magistrate in the field. This was normally pro consule or pro praetore, that is, in place of a consul or praetor, respectively. This was an expedient development, starting in 327 BC and becoming regular by 241 BC, that was meant to allow consuls and praetors to continue their activities in the field without disruption.

By allowing veteran commanders to stay in the field rather than being rotated out for someone who may not have had much experience in the theatre, the practice helped increase the chances of victory. Whether a commander, however, would be kept was largely decided politically and often motivated by commanders' ambitions. However, the effect of prorogation was to allow commanders to retain their positions as long as political support existed, weakening the republican check of the annual magistracy (and the rotation that implied) over commanders' activities.

Sometimes men who held no elected public office – that is, private citizens (privati) – were given imperium and prorogued, as justified by perceived military emergencies. This was most exemplified by Scipio Africanus and Pompey: the latter held a series of promagisterial commands before ever holding a magistracy or even joining the senate. With the expansion of the quaestiones perpetuae (permanent courts) in the late republic, it became normal for the provincial governors not to be one of the annual praetors: instead, an urban magistrate would be assigned a province after serving his urban term and prorogued.

The titles "proconsul" and "propraetor" are not used by Livy or literary sources of the republican era. Those Romans did not view a promagistracy as a formal office in the republic. For example, one was not made a "proconsul" but rather assigned pro consule (in place of a consul); this instead specified the means by or status with which one took a task (Latin: provincia) rather than a permanent office associated with that task. While during the middle republic it was common for praetors to be prorogued pro praetore and consuls pro consule, after the Sullan era essentially all promagistrates were pro consule, regardless of previous urban magistracy.

== Legal effect ==
A provincia was originally a task (e.g., war with Carthage) assigned to someone, sometimes with geographic boundaries; when such territories were formally annexed, (Note: What precisely a formal annexation meant is a subject of much scholarly discussion.) the fixed geographical entity became a "province" in modern terms, but in the early and middle Republic, the "task" was most often a military command within a defined theatre of operations with unclear geographic boundaries.

Prorogation did not create a new commander or even class of general. It merely allowed a magistrate to continue performing duties beyond the expiration of the magistracy. While Livy implies that prorogation extended a magistrate's imperium, this is contradicted in that imperium was not time-limited. Cicero, for example, possessed imperium even after his governorship of Cilicia expired.

Because imperium did not expire, prorogation was simply an extension or reassignment of a commander's possession of a provincia, something feasible by senatorial decree. Previously, a provincia was coterminous with a magistrate's term: i.e. a magistrate was assigned some provincia but the task necessarily expired when he rotated out. Prorogation had the effect of severing this connection. While normally someone in the theatre or province was prorogued, one could also be prorogued by assigning a someone still possessing imperium to new provincia (as was the case with two imperatores during the Catilinarian conspiracy).

While modern scholars often suppose that prorogation was intended originally to ensure that an experienced commander with hands-on knowledge of the local situation could conclude a successful campaign, in practice the extension of command was subject to "unsteady ad-hoc politics". And "unusual political influence" was required for prorogations of longer than one year.

A Roman governor had the right, and was normally expected, to remain in his province until his successor arrived, even when he had not been prorogued. According to the lex Cornelia de maiestate, passed following Sulla's dictatorship, a governor was then required to give up his province within 30 days. A prorogued magistrate could not exercise his imperium within Rome.

The nature of promagisterial imperium is also complicated by its relation to the celebrating of a triumph as awarded by the Senate. Before a commander could enter the city limits (pomerium) for his triumph, he had to lay aside arms formally and ritually, that is, he had to re-enter society as a civilian. (Note: After his term as governor in Spain in the late 60s BC, for instance, Julius Caesar was awarded a triumph. However, the law required him to declare his candidacy in person within the pomerium. Unable to get a dispensation from the senate and unwilling to wait a year, he entered the pomerium and gave up his command.) There are several early instances, however, of a commander celebrating a triumph during his two- or three-year term; it is possible that the triumph was held at the completion of his assignment and before he returned to the field with prorogued imperium.

== History ==
=== Emergence ===
The literary sources of Livy and Dionysius of Halicarnassus name a number of commanders in the early republic as proconsuls or propraetors. Modern historians believe the use of these titles is largely anachronistic and also self-contradictory, as Livy notes that the first promagisterial appointment was in 327 BC. In the republic after 367 BC, only three types magistrates held imperium: dictators, consuls, and praetors. At first, the appointment of dictatores and magistri equitum filled the need for additional military commanders.

The first recorded prorogation and promagistrate was that of the consul Quintus Publilius Philo in 327 BC. The senate ordered Philo, whose consulship was about to expire, to continue to perform his military duties as he was on the verge of capturing Palaepolis (modern day Naples) and completing his provincia (assigned task). It "probably seemed imprudent to send a new consul to take over a command that would be completed within days". Livy reports that legislation was then moved by the tribunes that "when [Quintus Publilius' term expired] he should continue to manage the campaign pro consule until he should bring the war with the Greeks to an end". This innovation permitted Philo to hold the military authority and responsibility of a magistrate while not actually being one. The Romans did not seem to be too bothered by the legal innovation which occurred, as Philo's success was rewarded with a triumph even though his consulship had expired.

In the following decades, it became regular practice to prorogue consuls and praetors also started to be prorogued after 241 BC. During the Second and Third Samnite Wars (326–290 BC), prorogation became a regular administrative practice that allowed continuity of military command without violating the principle of annual magistracies, or increasing the number of magistrates who held imperium. In 307, Quintus Fabius Maximus Rullianus became the second magistrate to have his command prorogued. But in the years 296–95, several prorogations are recorded at once, including four promagistrates who were granted imperium while they were private citizens (privati). Territorial expansion and increasing militarization drove a recognition that the "emergencies" had become a continual state of affairs, and a regular system of allotting commands developed.

In this early period, prorogued assignments, like the dictatorship, originated as special military commands, they may at first have been limited in practice to about six months, or the length of the campaigning season.

=== During the Punic Wars ===
Commanders were often prorogued during the First Punic War (264–241 BC). During the Second Punic War, Rome started to assign private citizens both imperium (military authority) and assign them to provincia (here meaning military tasks). These privati cum imperio were unable to triumph, probably due to their lack of an official magistracy. The legal authority for this emerged directly from the sovereign powers of the Roman assemblies who were then able "to select any man[,] whether or not he had ever been elected to office[,] and make him the commander of any provincia they wished". These privati cum imperio had titles pro consule or pro praetore, in place of regular magistrates.

The first instance may have been in 215 BC after the losses at Trebia, Trasimene, and Cannae when Marcus Claudius Marcellus was elected suffect consul in the place of Lucius Postumius Albinus, deceased. However, he was forced to resign when the augurs detected flaws in his election; even so, the people passed laws to invest him with imperium and assigned him to take a consular army regardless. Some scholars and argue instead that Marcellus' just-completed praetorship meant he was just prorogued.

The clearest instance is in the assignment of Publius Cornelius Scipio (later Africanus) to Spain in 211 BC before he had held any magistracy. After the deaths of his father and uncle in Spain, no consul or praetor wanted to take up the province. The people invested Scipio with the command and the necessary imperium and auspicium militiae regardless. After Scipio's victory in 206 BC, two more privati cum imperio were dispatched to the peninsula, which continued under such command until the creation of two new praetors in 197 BC made it possible to send annual magistrates. Generally, prorogation became almost the norm for the provinciae of Sicily, Sardinia, Hispania, and the naval fleets due to the lack of sufficient annual magistrates.

The expansion of promagistracies shattered the connection between military command and magisterial office, allowing any aristocrat so empowered by law the power to exercise military authority without any official status within the city's normal civilian government. Another impact of this wartime expedience was separating "magisterial precedence" from the magistracy itself, creating something akin to a military rank, evident in the jockeying of magistrates over the specific status of their prorogation: eg, desire to attain the more prestigious pro consule status. The close of the wartime crisis and the return of annual governors also dampened the length of prorogations, allowing the senate to regain more granular control over provincial assignments.

At the beginning, there were two distinct forms of prorogation – per T. Corey Brennan's Praetorship in the Roman republic – a prorogatio before the people to determine whether a provincial command should be extended and a propagatio from the senate in other cases. But by the 190s BC, the senate stopped submitting decisions on prorogation of permanent provinciae to the people for ratification and eventually all extensions of imperium were called prorogatio. After this point, the term prorogatio became a misnomer, since no rogatio (consultation of the people) was involved. This likely emerged because the decision of whether to send commanders had been replaced to the question of who should be sent, and therefore became a routine staffing decision.

=== In the late republic ===
The promagistrates take on a new importance with the annexation of Macedonia and the Roman province of Africa in 146 BC. The number of praetors was not increased even though the two new territories were organized as praetorian provinces. For the first time since the 170s, it became impossible for sitting magistrates to govern all the permanent praetorian provinciae, which now numbered eight. (Note: There were six provinces: Sicily, Sardinia, nearer and further Spain, Macedonia and Africa. Brennan also counts the urban and peregrine courts as provinciae.) This point marks the beginning of the era of the so-called "Roman governor", a post for which there is no single word in the Republic. Promagistracies became fully institutionalised, and even the praetor urbanus was sometimes prorogued. Due to the lack of replacement magistrates, governors with established territorial provinces had their tenures increased. The addition of the wealthy Asian province in 133 BC as a bequest of Attalus III put further pressure on the system, again without increasing the number of praetorships:

The senate evidently placed a premium on controlling competition for the consulship, and chose to neglect the rapidly accelerating erosion of a fundamental Republican constitutional principle — the annual magistracy — as well as to ignore the added inconvenience to commanders and possible danger to provincials... The members of the senate had lost serious interest in maintaining a working administrative scheme for Rome's growing empire.

In one major administrative development for which the career of Marius offers the clearest evidence, praetors now needed to remain in Rome to preside over increased activity in the criminal courts; only after their term were praetors regularly assigned to a province as proconsul or propraetor. The scale of Roman military commitments in annexed territories during the late republic required regular prorogation, since the number of magistrates and ex-magistrates who were both able commanders and willing to accept provincial governorships did not increase proportionally. Emergency grants of imperium in the field during the Social War (91–87 BC) made the granting of extra-magisterial command routine. When Sulla assumed the dictatorship in late 82 BC, the territorial provinces alone numbered ten, with possibly six permanent courts to be presided over in the city.

The rise of popularis political tactics from the time of Gaius Marius forward also coincided with the creation of "super provinciae", "massive commands in which multiple permanent provinces were incorporated into a single consular provincial assignment" with "proportionately larger military and financial resources". Pompey, for example, declined a province after his consulship in 70 BC until he was able to convince a friendly tribune to create an enormous command against the pirates in consequence of the lex Gabinia in 67 BC and, then, a similarly vast eastern command during the Third Mithridatic War the next year. These super-provinces were traditional in the sense that they were meant to defeat some particular enemy, but the scale of the campaign and the concentration of power under a single commander was unprecedented. The fixed multi-year terms of those campaigns also were unheard of in the earlier Republic; their length detracted from the Senate's de facto powers to assign provinces and control the ambition of its members by splitting both the proceeds and glory of single campaigns between multiple commanders.

== Types ==
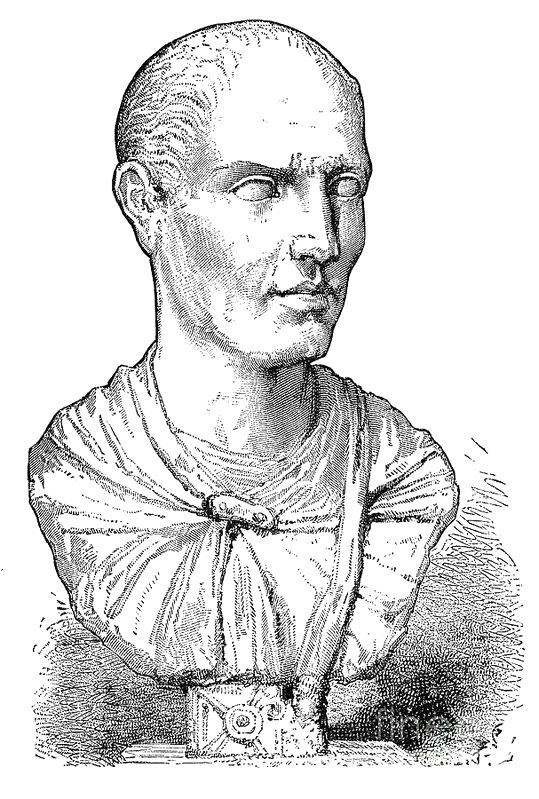
Marble bust of a person that is traditionally identified to be Lucius Licinius Lucullus. Lucullus was quaestor in 87 BC under Sulla and acted pro quaestore campaigning in the East all the way until 80 BC.

=== Propraetor ===
A propraetor was a form of promagistrate, as the name implies, acting in place of a praetor. Initially, praetors who were prorogued continued to act pro praetore after their terms, but through the second century, prorogued praetors started to be titled the more prestigious pro consule instead. After the time of Sulla, all governors were prorogued pro consule. One of the few exceptions to this rule was a senatorial snub against Octavian in 43 BC when he was vested with imperium and prorogued pro praetore, putting him lower in status than all other promagistrates.

If a governor died in office, it was normal for his quaestor to assume command pro praetore. It also became normal for legates during the late republic to be titled pro praetore if they were themselves vested with imperium. Pompey, for example, received such legates during the campaign against the pirates in consequence of the lex Gabinia. During the imperial period, the legates of the emperor were titled pro praetore, consistent with late republican practice; the quaestors and legates of the public provinces were by this period similarly granted praetorian imperium and likewise titled pro praetore.

=== Proquaestor ===
A proquaestor was a person who took up the administrative duties normally adopted by a quaestor. This was normally done in the absence of a quaestor, usually by death or resignation. In such cases, a governor normally named a member of his staff: for example, Gnaeus Cornelius Dolabella named Gaius Verres to serve pro quaestore in 80 BC. At other times, ex-quaestors were sent or kept as proquaestor to act as someone's quaestor. But more extraordinarily, in the absence of sufficient governors or to complete some specific task, an ex-quaestor could be sent as a governor with the title pro quaestor pro praetore. For example, Marcus Porcius Cato was dispatched to Cyprus pro quaestore pro praetore to handle the annexation of the island.

=== Procurator ===
The title procurator is not related to prorogation and is not a promagistracy. Procurators were originally agents of rich men, later of the emperor, who acted on his patron's behalf with regard to financial matters.

== See also ==
- Royal prerogative, a later medieval derivation and evolution of the term as method(s) of governance
