= Privatus =

Roman legal concept of private citizenry and ownership

In Roman law, the Latin adjective privatus makes a legal distinction between that which is "private" and that which is publicus, "public" in the sense of pertaining to the Roman people (populus Romanus).

Used as a substantive, the term privatus refers to a citizen who is not a public official or a member of the military. Increasingly throughout the Middle and Late Republic, the privatus was nevertheless sometimes granted imperium during a crisis; the definition of crisis was elastic, and the amassing of power by unelected individuals (privati) contributed to the breakdown of the checks and balances of the republican system.

== Legal terms ==
- Res privatae, private property, or "things belonging to individuals," in contrast to res publicae.
- Res privata Caesaris, the property of the emperor that was purely private.
- Ager privatus, privately owned land as distinguished from ager publicus.
- Actiones privatae, actions protecting an individual's private interests; similar to iudicia privata, referring to civil trials presided over by the iudex privatus (below).
- Iter privatum, a private road.
- Carcer privatus, a private prison. This form of incarceration was used for slaves, and in early time for debtors who failed to pay their creditors (see nexum). The emperors Zeno and Justinian prohibited private prisons.

=== Iudex privatus ===
The iudex privatus was a sole arbitrator or lay judge who conducted a civil case to which the parties had consented and who usually nominated him. In the event that the parties could not agree on a judge, he was chosen from an official list of potential judges drawn up by the praetor. He was also called a iudex unus.

== See also ==
- Civilian
