= Gellius Egnatius =

Samnite leader of the Varriani (died 295 BC)

Gellius Egnatius (died 295 BC) was the leader of the Varriani, a leading clan of the Samnites during the Third Samnite War, which broke out in 298 BC. By the end of the second campaign the Samnites appeared completely defeated, however in the following year Gellius Egnatius marched into Etruria, and roused the Etruscans to a close co-operation against Rome. This withdrew Roman troops from Samnium for a period of time; but the forces of the confederates were defeated by the combined armies of consuls Lucius Volumnius Flamma Violens and Appius Claudius Caecus.

In the fourth campaign in 295 BC Egnatius induced the Gauls and the Umbrians to join the confederacy; but due to the withdrawal of the Etruscans and the Umbrians, the Gauls and the Samnites fell back beyond the Apennines, and were met by the Romans near the town of Sentinum. A decisive battle, marked by the heroic devotion of P. Decius Mus, ensured that the Samnites were defeated and their leader Egnatius was slain.
