= Publius Decius Mus (consul 312 BC) =

Roman general and statesman (died 295 BC)

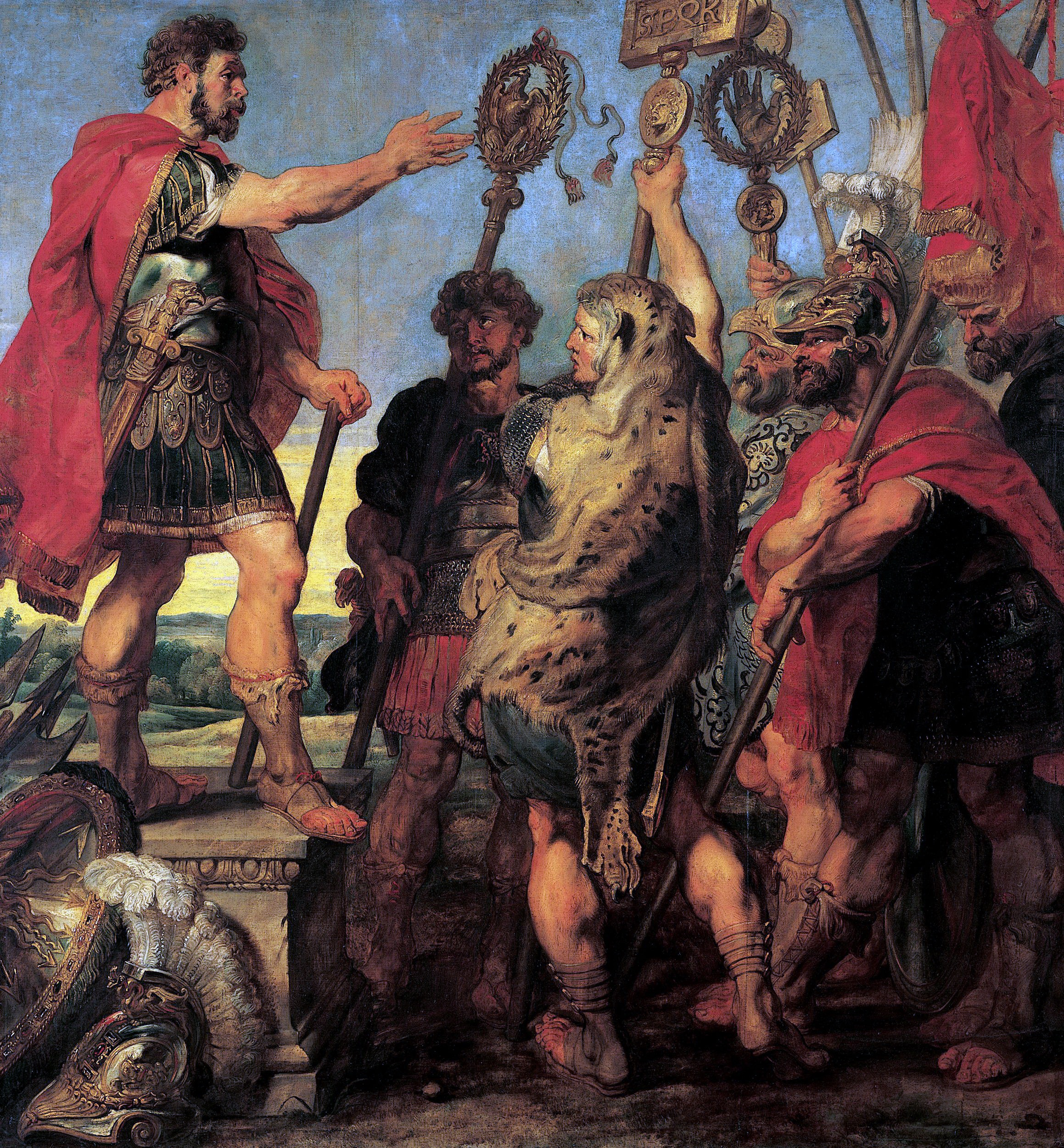
Rubens, Decius Mus relating his dream

Publius Decius Mus (died 295 BC), of the plebeian gens Decia, was a Roman consul in the years 312 BC, 308 BC, 297 BC and 295 BC. He was a member of a family that was renowned for sacrificing themselves on the battlefield for Rome.

== First and second consulship ==
Publius Decius Mus, born the son of the consul of 340 BC Publius Decius Mus, was elected consul in 312 BC together with Marcus Valerius Corvus. When war broke out with the Samnites, Mus had to stay in Rome due to an illness and it was his colleague who was sent to manage the war. When the Etruscans joined in the war on the side of Rome's enemies, Mus was ordered by the Senate to appoint a dictator.

In 309 BC he served as a legate under the dictator Lucius Papirius Cursor and the next year he was elected consul again, this time with Quintus Fabius Maximus Rullianus as his colleague. While his colleague handled the war against Samnium, Mus was entrusted with the war against the Etruscans in which he was so successful that the Etruscans sued for a truce.

In 306 BC Mus was appointed as the Master of the Horse to the dictator Publius Cornelius Scipio Barbatus. In 304 BC, Mus and Rullianus were elected censor. In 300 BC Mus successfully espoused the cause of opening the pontificate to the plebeians against Appius Claudius Caecus.

== Third Samnite War ==
In 297 BC Mus and Rullianus were again elected consul. This time both consuls were to go to Samnium to make war. In this campaign Mus was able to defeat a Samnite army near Maleventum. The next year saw his command in Samnium prorogued as proconsul.

The Third Samnite War saw Rome opposed by a formidable coalition of Etruscans, Samnites, Umbrians and Gauls. When Rullianus was unanimously called to the consulship, he stipulated as a condition for accepting that Mus again be his colleague so in 295 BC Mus was elected to a fourth consulship. While Mus was first stationed in Samnium, events up north dictated that both Roman armies be united to face the enemy. When the armies clashed near Sentinum, Publius Decius Mus commanded the left wing of the Roman army. Faced by the Gauls, his troops started giving way under their attacks and Mus followed the example of his father by performing the devotio, dedicating himself and the enemy army as sacrifices to the gods of the underworld, then rushing the enemy where he fell in the battle.

Publius Decius Mus was the namesake father of the consul of 279 BC, Publius Decius Mus.

Political offices
Preceded by Lucius Papirius Cursor V, and Gaius Junius Bubulcus Brutus II	Consul; 312 BC with Marcus Valerius Maximus Corrinus	Succeeded by Gaius Junius Bubulcus Brutus III, and Quintus Aemilius Barbula
Preceded by Third dictator year	Consul; 308 BC with Quintus Fabius Maximus Rullianus III	Succeeded by Appius Claudius Caecus, and Lucius Volumnius Flamma Violens
Preceded by Lucius Cornelius Scipio Barbatus, and Gnaeus Fulvius Maximus Centumalus	Consul; 297 BC with Quintus Fabius Maximus Rullianus IV	Succeeded by Appius Claudius Caecus II, and Lucius Volumnius Flamma Violens II
Preceded by Appius Claudius Caecus II, and Lucius Volumnius Flamma Violens II	Consul; 295 BC with Quintus Fabius Maximus Rullianus V	Succeeded by Lucius Postumius Megellus II, and Marcus Atilius Regulus
