= Quintus Fabius Maximus Rullianus =

4th-century BC Roman statesman and general

- Known for: Second and Third Samnite War
- Office: Magister Equitum (325 BCE); Consul of Rome (322 BCE); Roman dictator (315 BCE); Consul of Rome (310 BCE); Consul of Rome (308 BCE); Censor (304–299 BCE); Consul of Rome (297 BCE); Consul of Rome (295 BCE); Princeps senatus (later life)
- Children: Quintus Fabius Maximus Gurges
- Father: Marcus Fabius Ambustus
- Relatives: Quintus Fabius Maximus Verrucosus (grandson or great-grandson)

Military service
- Allegiance: Rome
- Branch/service: Roman army
- Battles/wars: Second Samnite War; Battle of Imbrinium; Battle of Lautulae; Battle of Sutrium; Battle of the Ciminian Forest; Third Samnite War; Battle of Tifernum; Battle of Sentinum

Quintus Fabius Maximus Rullianus (or Rullus) was a patrician, politician and soldier of the Roman Republic during the fourth and early third century BC. He was the son of Marcus Fabius Ambustus, of the patrician Fabii, was five times consul, dictator once (possibly twice), censor, and a hero of the Samnite Wars. He was brother to Marcus Fabius Ambustus, who was named after their father, and the grandfather (or great-grandfather) of Quintus Fabius Maximus Verrucosus (hero of the Second Punic War).

His first appearance in surviving records is as magister equitum in 325 BC, when he won a daring victory against the Samnites at Imbrinium. However, he had acted without the authority of the dictator Lucius Papirius Cursor, who was angry and demanded that the Senate punish Fabius for disobeying orders. Livy (8.31-36) describes a tense scene where Papirius stood nearly alone against the Senate and people, who supported Fabius because of his victory, but who also did not wish to undercut the absolute authority they had given Papirius; finally Fabius threw himself at the feet of the dictator and asked forgiveness, which was granted.

Fabius became consul for the first time in 322 BC, although little is said of his time in office. The following year (321) he serves a Interrex. He appears next as a dictator himself in 315 BC, successfully besieging Saticula and then, less successfully, fighting at Lautulae (Diodorus mentions another dictatorship in 313 BC, but this is probably mistaken). As consul in 310 BC, Fabius fought the Etruscans at Sutrium, then followed them when they fled into the Ciminian Forest and defeated them again. Consul again in 308 BC, he defeated Perusia and Nuceria Alfaterna.

He then served as censor with Decius Mus beginning in 304 BC. The last Lustrum was shortened to speed up Rullianus taking up the office, because they wanted him overturn the reforms Appius Claudius Caecus had instituted during his censorship. Caecus had admitted citizens without property (a very numerous group) to all Roman tribes; Rullianus limited them to the four urban tribes and by doing so took away most of their newly achieved political power. For his censorship he received the cognomen Maximus, the first of his line to get the honorific name. A further measure he took was to institute an annual parade for the equites on the 15th of July.

Fabius was consul for the fourth time in 297 BC, defeating the Samnites at Tifernum by sending part of his line around the hills behind the enemy. In 296 BC, as Lucius Volumnius and Appius Claudius Caecus were consuls, he and Publius Decius Mus were made proconsul and their imperium was prolonged by six months. In 295 BC he was elected unanimously for a fifth term, where he won lasting fame for defeating a coalition of Etruscans, Samnites, and Gauls in the epic Battle of Sentinum.

Rullianus' son was Quintus Fabius Maximus Gurges, and his grandson or great-grandson the famous Quintus Fabius Maximus Verrucosus, surnamed "Cunctator", of the Second Punic War.

His son, Gurges, was defeated in Samnium and being spared a recall from the army and humiliation by the intervention of Rullianus who promised to help him as second-in-command (senior legate). The two men defeated the Samnites and captured Gaius Pontius, the Samnite commander, who was paraded in the triumph and beheaded.

Rullianus became Princeps Senatus in his later years.

Although Rullianus' fame is undoubted, the main source of his life is Livy, who in turn worked from annals by Fabius Pictor and others, and many of the details are suspiciously similar to stories of the Cunctator.

The agnomen (actually more likely an extra cognomen) "Rullus" appears to mean "uncultivated, boorish" or "beggar".

== See also ==
- Diodorus Siculus
- Eutropius
- Frontinus
- Livy (books 8-11 passim)
- Valerius Maximus

Political offices
Preceded by Gaius Sulpicius Longus II, and Quintus Aemilius Cerretanus	Consul of the Roman Republic; 322 BC with Lucius Fulvius Curvus	Succeeded by Titus Veturius Calvinus II, and Spurius Postumius Albinus Caudinus II
Preceded by Gaius Junius Bubulcus Brutus III, and Quintus Aemilius Barbula II	Consul of the Roman Republic; 310 BC with Gaius Marcius Rutilus Censorinus II	Succeeded by Third dictator year
Preceded by Third dictator year	Consul of the Roman Republic; 308 BC with Publius Decius Mus II	Succeeded by Appius Claudius Caecus, and Lucius Volumnius Flamma Violens
Preceded by Lucius Cornelius Scipio Barbatus, and Gnaeus Fulvius Maximus Centumalus	Consul of the Roman Republic; 297 BC with Publius Decius Mus III	Succeeded by Appius Claudius Caecus II, and Lucius Volumnius Flamma Violens II
Preceded by Appius Claudius Caecus II, and Lucius Volumnius Flamma Violens II	Consul of the Roman Republic; 295 BC with Publius Decius Mus IV	Succeeded by Lucius Postumius Megellus II, and Marcus Atilius Regulus
