= Appius Claudius Caecus =

Roman statesman and writer (fl. c. 312–279 BC)

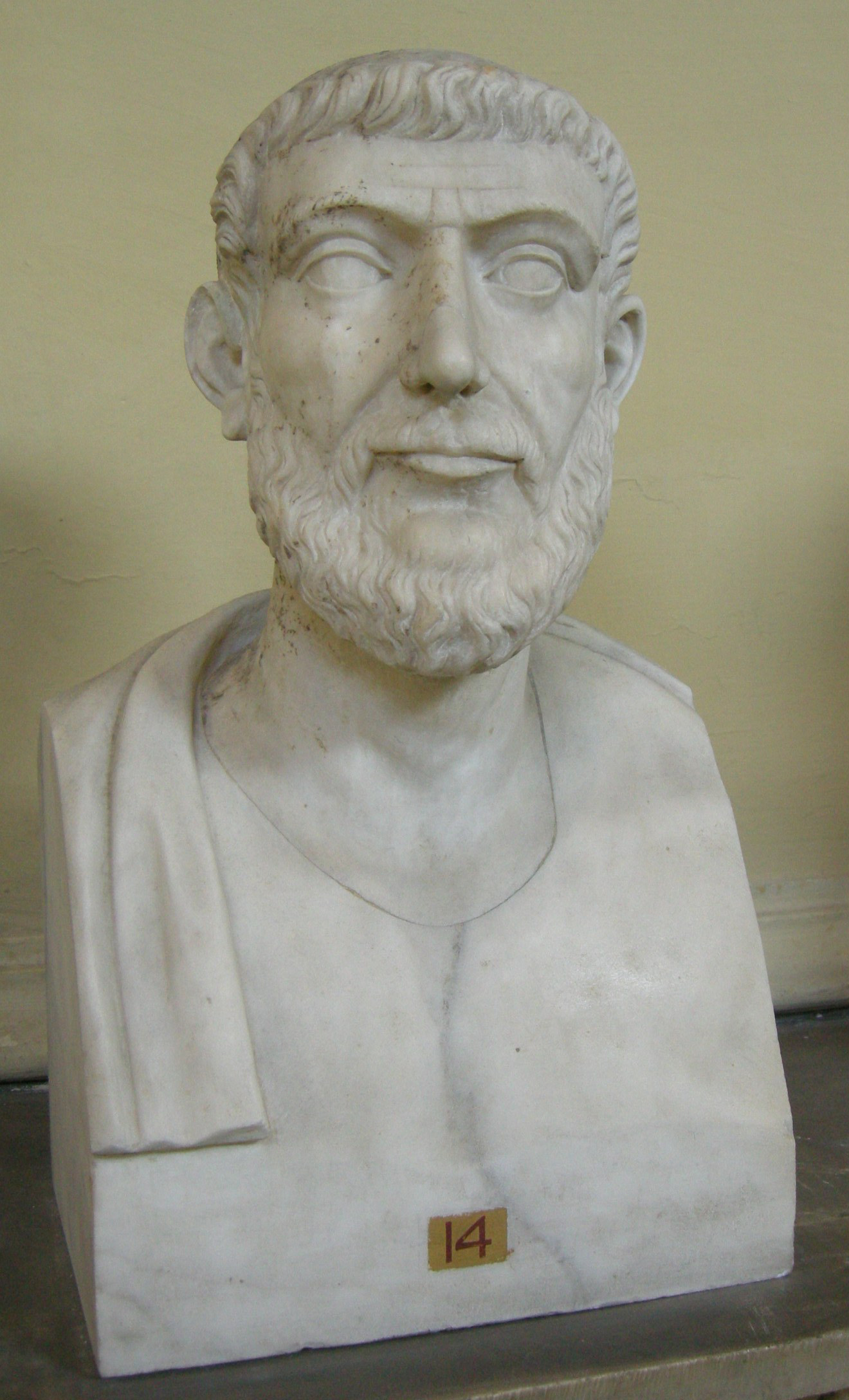
- Possible bust of Caecus, now in the Chiaramonti Museum in the Vatican.
- Born: Appius Claudius Crassus
- Office: Censor (312–307 BC); Consul (307, 296 BC); Praetor (295 BC); Dictator (c. 285 BC)
- Children: 9

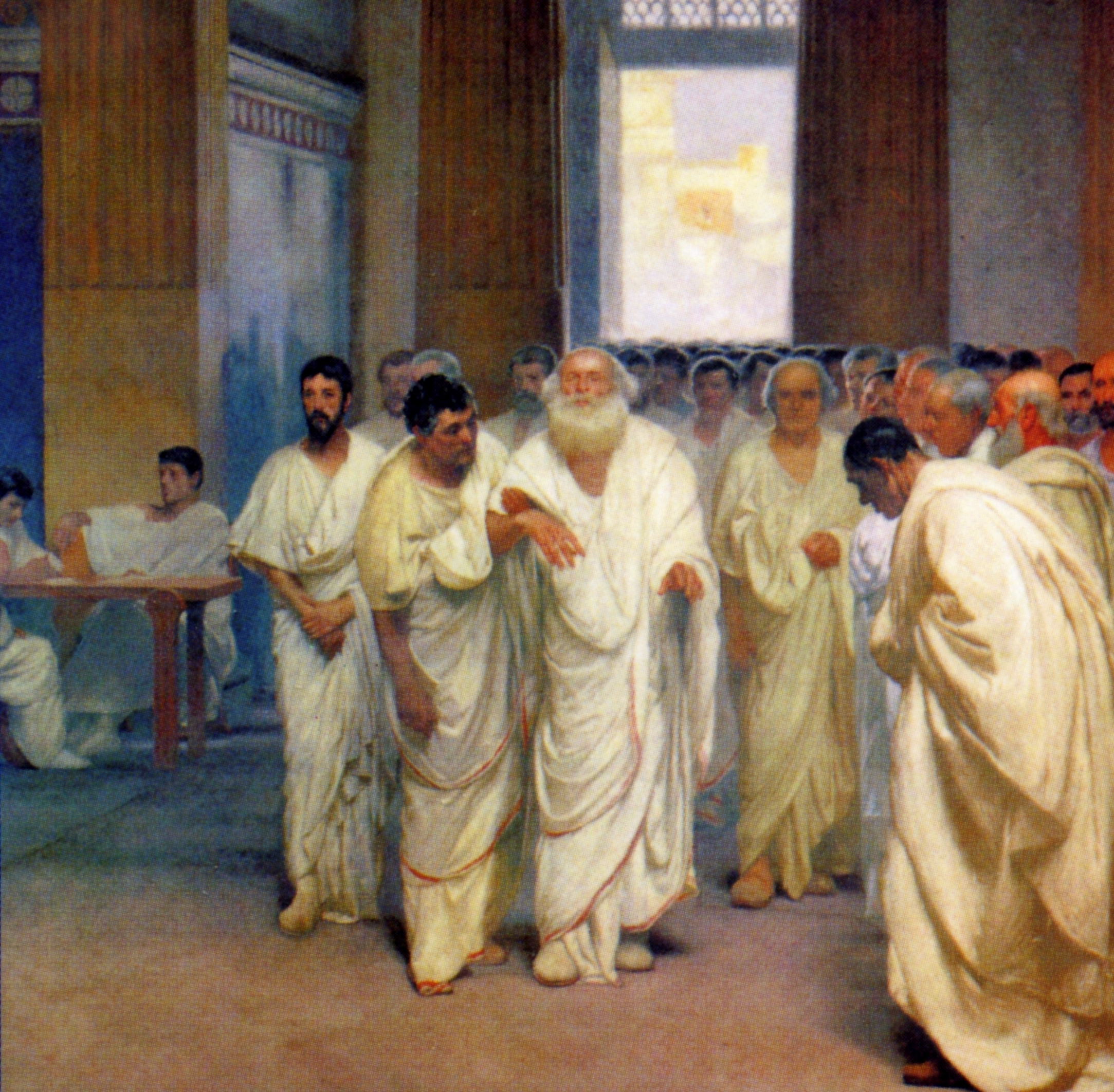
Appius Claudius Caecus is led into the Curia Hostilia by his sons. 19th century painting by Cesare Maccari.

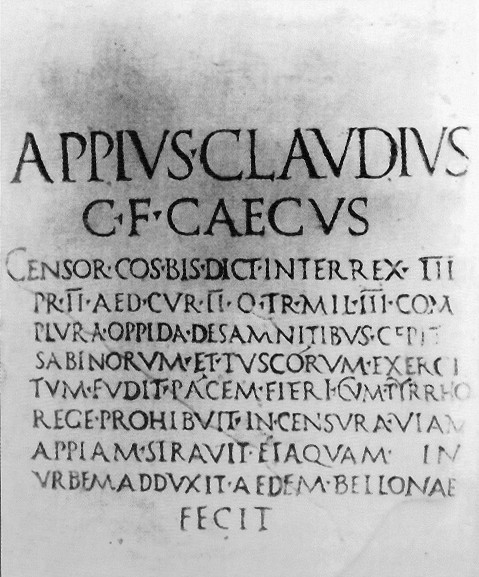
Memorial inscription of Appius Claudius C. F. Caecus, "Appius Claudius Caecus, son of Gaius."

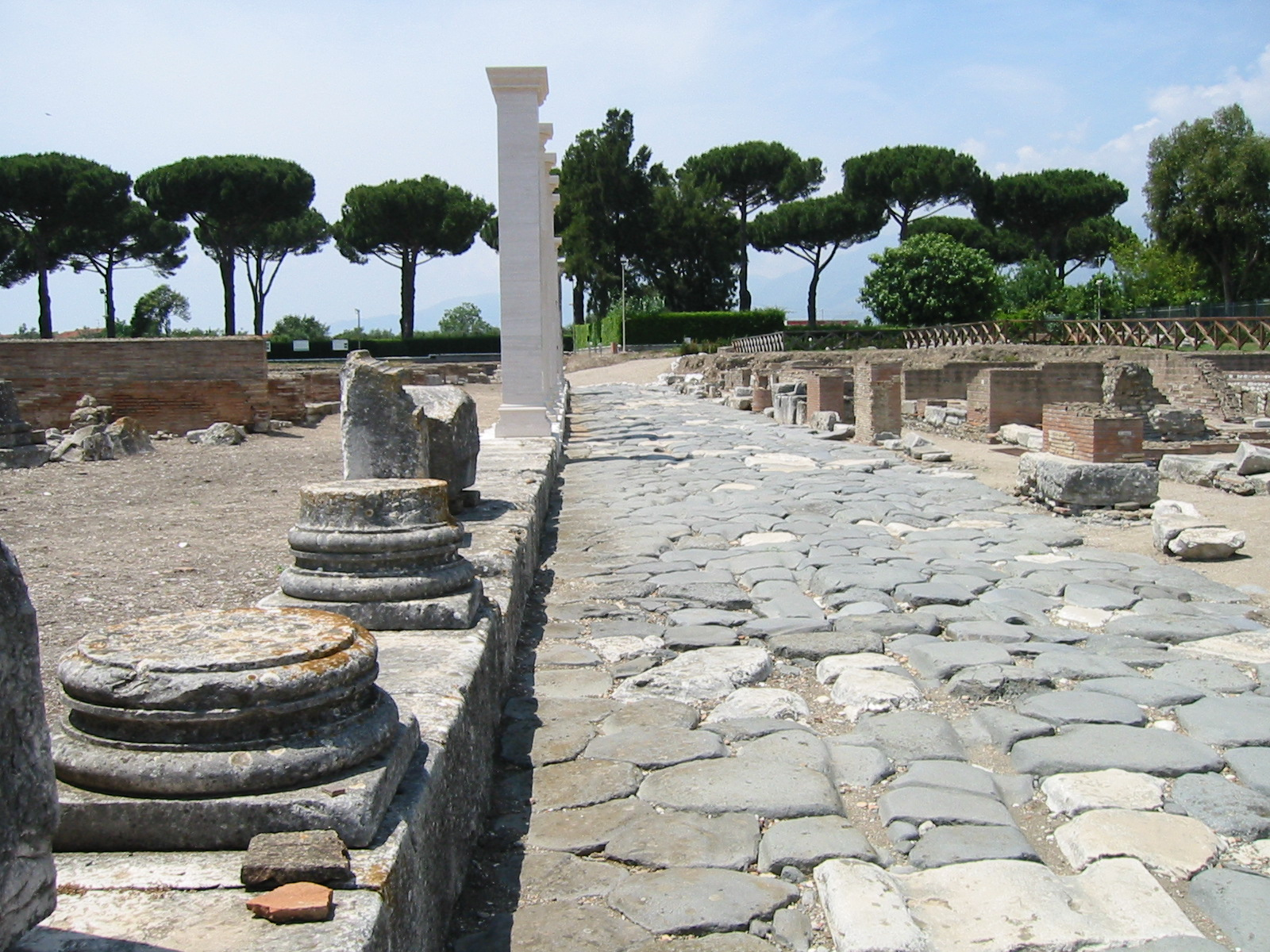
The first Roman road, the Via Appia. Via Appia within the ancient Minturno

Appius Claudius Caecus (fl. c. 312–279 BC) was a statesman and writer from the Roman Republic. He is best known for two major building projects: the Appian Way (Latin: Via Appia), the first major Roman road, and the first aqueduct in Rome, the Aqua Appia.

He is the first Roman public figure whose life can be traced with some historical certainty. He also instigated controversial popular-minded reforms and is also credited with the authorship of a juristic treatise, a collection of moral essays, and several poems, making him one of Rome's earliest literary figures.

A patrician of illustrious lineage, Caecus first came to prominence with his election to the position of censor in 312 BC, which he held for five years. During Caecus's time in office, aside from his building projects, he introduced several controversial but poorly-understood constitutional reforms: he increased the voting power of the poor and landless in the legislative assemblies, and admitted lower-class citizens to the Roman Senate, though these measures were partially undone by the resentful nobility. In addition, Caecus was the first censor to draw up a formal list of senators. These reforms massively increased the prestige of the censorship, which had previously only been a minor magistracy. As consul (296 BC) and then praetor (295 BC), Caecus led military campaigns against the Etruscans and Samnites. Later in life, having become blind (Latin: caecus, whence the surname) from old age, he delivered a speech to the Senate successfully opposing peace with the Epirote king Pyrrhus.

His reforms did trigger some outrage, as he broke a number of established traditions. Appius embroiled himself in several bitter political feuds, especially with the Fabii (a powerful Roman family). Fabius Pictor, who was the earliest Roman historian and a member of the Fabian family, may have been the source for a significant amount of smear against Caecus, accusing him of being a corrupted, immoral demagogue, and an inept general. Owing to the wide divergence in the sources, modern scholars have had very different interpretations of Caecus' deeds: he has been described as a revolutionary, a reactionary, a would-be tyrant, or a great reformer, comparable to Athenian figures like Cleisthenes and Pericles.

== Family background ==
Caecus, who was originally called Appius Claudius Crassus, was born into the patrician clan of the Claudii, one of the most important Roman families of the time, whose members had held executive offices of state since the beginning of the Republic. The family were widely described in Roman sources as haughty aristocrats with arch-conservative views, though this stereotype was likely only created long after Caecus's death. Caecus's father was called Gaius Claudius Inregillensis, known only for being appointed dictator in 337 BC and immediately resigning after the augurs had found a religious fault in his appointment.

His mother is not known, but he had a much younger brother, Appius Claudius Caudex, who became consul in 264, four years after Caecus' elder son. Since Caecus' sons became consuls over a period of 28 years and long after his own time, he probably married at least twice, even though none of his wives is known.

== Early career ==
The only information known about Caecus' early career before his censorship is from his eulogy, formerly displayed on the Roman Forum. This summary of his career lists all the responsibilities he held, including some junior offices, while literary sources only record upper magistracies (censor, consul, and praetor); however it does not provide any date and the offices are not ordered chronologically. The eulogy tells that he was the military tribune three times, the quaestor one time, and curule aedile twice. These junior magistracies were standard and found in the career of every Roman politician, but the number of times he held these positions is much more unusual. Endre Ferenczy thought Caecus held them all before his censorship because of his family's decline, which forced him to repeat them to build his popularity (especially as aedile, because this magistrate organised games), therefore explaining his early censorship. However, his thesis has been criticised, notably by Stephen Oakley, who notes that there is not enough evidence to know whether iterations of the military tribuneship and aedileship were really exceptional for this period, during which most careers are unknown.

It is nonetheless certain that Caecus was military tribune before his censorship, because it was a requirement for being elected consul, which he became immediately after his censorship. As military tribune, he certainly served during the Second Samnite War (326–304 BC), the main conflict in Italy at the time.

== Censorship (312–308 BC) ==
Appius Claudius Caecus was a Roman censor from 312 BC to 308 BC, He was not a consul beforehand which later became a prerequisite for the office. During his time as censor he sought support from the lower classes, by allowing sons of freedmen to serve in the Senate, and extending voting privileges to men in the rural tribes who did not own land. During the Second Samnite War, he advocated the founding of Roman colonies (colonia) throughout Latium and Campania to serve as fortifications against the Samnites and Etruscans.

Appius is best known for two construction undertakings as censor: the Appian Way (Latin: Via Appia), the first major Roman road, running between Rome and Beneventum to the south; and the first aqueduct in Rome, the Aqua Appia.

== Legal contributions ==
Appius' major legal contribution came from him starting the publication of legis actiones ("methods of legal practice"). This publication served as a guide for Roman Legal procedure. The publication also included a list of days that court was to be held on.

== Later career (307–280 BC) ==
During this time period he served as consul twice; in 307 BC and 296 BC, he was also appointed Dictator in 285 BC. Appius gave a famous speech in this period against Cineas, an envoy of Pyrrhus of Epirus, declaring that Rome would never surrender. The speech is the source of the saying "every man is the architect of his own fortune" (Latin: quisque faber suae fortunae), and was still known in the time of Cicero In 279 BC, Appius went blind due to a curse, according to Livy.

=== Literary output ===
Appius wrote several books over his life. He wrote a book called Sententiae, which was based upon a verse of Greek model. It was "the first Roman book of literary character". Appius also wrote treatise, De Usurpationibus ("Concerning Usurpations"), which is lost and the content is unknown. In addition Appius was one of the earliest known Roman prose and verse authors whose name is still known today. He was also concerned with literature and rhetoric, and instituted reforms in Latin orthography, allegedly ending the use of the letter Z.

== Descendants ==
Caecus had four sons and five daughters who reached adulthood. His four sons were Appius Claudius Russus (consul in 268), Publius Claudius Pulcher (consul in 249), Gaius Claudius Centho (consul in 240), and Tiberius Claudius Nero (grandfather of the consul of 202).

Appius Claudius Caecus is used in Cicero's Pro Caelio as a stern and disapproving ancestor to Clodia. Cicero assumes the voice of Caecus in a scathing prosopopoeia, where Caecus is incensed at Clodia for associating with Caelius, a member of the middle equestrian class instead of the upper patrician class. Caecus's achievements, such as the building of the Appian Way and the Aqua Appia, are mentioned as being defiled by Clodia's actions.

== Family tree of Appius Caecus ==
Legend
Orange	Dictator	Yellow	Censor	Green	Consul

Ap. Crassus; Inregillensis dict. 362, cos. 349
C. Inregillensis dict. 337
Ap. Caecus cens. 312 cos. 307, 296 dict. c.285	Ap. Caudex cos. 264
Ap. Russus cos. 268	Ti. Nero	P. Pulcher cos 249	C. Centho cos 240, cens. 225 dict. 213
Ti. Nero	P. Nero	Ap. Pulcher cos. 212	C. Centho leg. 200
C. Nero cos. 207 cens. 204	Ti. Nero cos. 202	Ap. Nero pr. 195	Ap. Pulcher cos. 185	P. Pulcher cos. 184	C. Pulcher cos. 177 cens. 169	Ap. Centho pr. 175	C. Centho leg. 155

== Bibliography ==
=== Ancient sources ===
- Diodorus Siculus, Bibliotheca Historica.
- Fasti Capitolini, Fasti Triumphales.
- Livy, Ab Urbe Condita (English translation by Rev. Canon Roberts on Wikisource), Periochae (English translation by Jona Lendering on Livius.org).
- Valerius Maximus, Factorum ac Dictorum Memorabilium (English translation by Samuel Speed on EEBO).

=== Modern sources ===
- Boatwright, Mary T.; Gargola, Daniel J.; Lenski, Noel; Talbert, Richard J. A. (2011). The Romans: From Village to Empire: A History of Rome from Earliest Times to the End of the Western Empire (2nd ed.). Oxford University Press. ISBN 978-0-19-973057-5.
- Broughton, T. Robert S. (1951). The Magistrates of the Roman Republic. Vol. 1. American Philological Association.
- Ferenczy, Endre (1965). "La carrière d'Appius Claudius Caecus jusqu'à la censure" (PDF). Acta Antiqua Academiae Scientiarum Hungaricae. 13: 379–404. ISSN 0044-5975.
- Hafner, German (1970). "Römische und italische Porträts des 4. Jahrhunderts v. Chr". Mitteilungen des Deutschen Archäologischen Instituts, Römische Abteilung (in German). 77: 59–66.
- Humm, Michel (2005). Appius Claudius Caecus: La République accomplie. Rome: École Française de Rome. ISBN 2-7283-0682-6.
- Münzer, Friedrich (1899). "Claudius 91" . Realencyclopädie der classischen Altertumswissenschaft (in German). Vol. 3, part 2. columns 2681–2685.
- Oakley, S.P. (2005a). A Commentary on Livy, Books VI–X, Volume III: Book IX. Oxford: Clarendon Press. ISBN 0-19-927143-7.
- Vasaly, Ann (1987). "Personality and Power: Livy's Depiction of the Appii Claudii in the First Pentad". Transactions of the American Philological Association. 117: 203–226. doi:10.2307/283967. JSTOR 283967.
- Wiseman, T.P. (1979). Clio's Cosmetics: Three Studies in Greco-Roman Literature. Leicester University Press. ISBN 0-8476-6206-3.

Political offices
Preceded by Publius Decius Mus II; Quintus Fabius Maximus Rullianus III	Roman consul 307 BC with Lucius Volumnius Flamma Violens	Succeeded by Quintus Marcius Tremulus; Publius Cornelius Arvina
Preceded by Quintus Fabius Maximus Rullianus IV; Publius Decius Mus III	Roman consul II; 296 BC with Lucius Volumnius Flamma Violens II	Succeeded by Quintus Fabius Maximus Rullianus V Publius Decius Mus IV
