= Lucius Volumnius Flamma Violens =

Ancient Roman general and statesman

- Born: c. 340 BC
- Died: c. 273 BC
- Occupations: soldier and consul of the Roman Republic
- Spouse(s): Verginia, daughter of Aulus Verginius

Lucius Volumnius Flamma Violens was a consul of the Roman Republic twice, in 307 BC and 296 BC, a novus homo ("new man"), the first of his plebeian gens to attain the consulship. Volumnius served in both his consulships with the patrician Appius Claudius Caecus. He took an active role in leading Roman forces during the Third Samnite War.

== Background ==
According to Roman tradition, membership of the Roman Senate, the city's magistracies, the offices of consul and various religious positions were restricted to patricians. Volumnius was a beneficiary of the Conflict of the Orders, when, during a 200-year struggle, plebeians gradually gained political equality and the right to hold all such offices. The Lex Licinia Sextia of 367 BC had restored the consulship after a brief period of anarchy and sought to reserve one of the two consular offices for a plebeian. The Conflict of the Orders was finally resolved in 287 BC, when plebeians gained political equality.

== Career ==
A new man, Volumnius was the first member of his family to become a consul. John Briscoe says of him "The first plebeian consul known to have presided was L. Volumnius Flamma Violens in 296 [sic]." However, Mario Torelli says "...the famous P [sic] Volumnius Flamma Violens, cos. 307 and 296 BC, could be among the (plebeian) descendants of P. Volumnius Amintinus Gallus, cos. 461."

Volumnius served as consul twice, in 307 BC and 296 BC, both times in partnership with the patrician Appius Claudius Caecus.

The Third Samnite War broke out in 298 BC. By the end of its second year, the Samnites, led by Gellius Egnatius, seemed defeated, but the next year (296 BC) Egnatius marched to Umbria and formed an alliance against Rome with the neighbouring Etruscans. The previous consuls were given a six-month extension of their command as proconsuls to carry on the war in Samnium. Livy pointed out some discrepancies between his sources, noting that some annalists said that Romulea and Ferentium were taken by Quintus Fabius and that Publius Decius took only Murgantia, while others said that the towns were taken by the consuls of the year, and others still gave all the credit to Lucius Volumnius who, they said, had sole command in Samnium.

Meanwhile, in Etruria Gellius Egnatius, a Samnite commander, was organising a campaign against Rome. Almost all the Etruscan city-states voted for war, the nearest Umbrian tribes joined in and there were attempts to hire Gauls as auxiliaries. News of this reached Rome and Appius Claudius set off for Etruria with two legions and 15,000 allied troops. Lucius Volumnius had already left for Samnium with two legions and 12,000 allies. This is the first time Livy gives details about the Roman forces and figures for the allied troops for the Samnite wars. It is also the first time that we hear of the consuls commanding two legions each. Including the forces of the proconsuls, in this year the Romans must have mobilised six legions.

Appius Claudius suffered a number of setbacks and lost the confidence of his troops. Lucius Volumnius, who had taken three fortifications in Samnium, sent Quintus Fabius to suppress disturbances by the plebeians in Lucania, left the ravaging of rural Samnium to Publius Decius and went to Etruria. Livy notes that some annalists said that Appius Claudius had written him a letter to summon him from Samnium and that this became a subject of dispute between the two consuls, with the former denying it and the latter insisting that he had been summoned by the former. Livy thought that Appius Claudius did not write the letter, but said that he wanted to send his colleague back to Samnium and felt that he ungratefully denied his need for help. However, the soldiers begged him to stay. A dispute between the two men ensued, but the soldiers insisted that both consuls fight in Etruria. The Etruscans faced Lucius Volumnius and the Samnites advanced on Appius Claudius. Livy said that "the enemy could not withstand a force so much greater than they were accustomed to meet." They were routed; 7,900 were killed and 2,010 were captured.

Lucius Volumnius hurried back to Samnium because the proconsulships of Quintus Fabius and Publius Decius were about to expire. Meanwhile, the Samnites raised new troops and raided Roman territories and allies in Campania around Capua and Falernium. Lucius Volumnius headed for Campania and was informed that the Samnites had gone back to Samnium to take their loot. He caught up with their camp and defeated a force which was made unfit to fight by the burden of their loot. The Samnite commander, Staius Minatius, was attacked by the prisoners of the Samnites and delivered to the consul. The senate decided to establish the colonies of Minturnae on the mouth of the River Liris and Sinuessa further inland, in the former territory of the Ausoni.

== Wife ==
Volumnius married Verginia, the daughter of Aulus Verginius, a patrician. She is one of the one hundred and six subjects of Giovanni Boccaccio's On Famous Women (De mulieribus claris, 1362 AD). In about 295 BC, the patrician matronae insulted Verginia by forbidding her access to the ceremony at the shrine of Pudicitia Patricia honouring the female virtue of pudicitia (modesty, or sexual virtue), on account of her having married a plebeian. As a result, she erected an altar in her own house to Plebeia Pudicitia. Boccaccio says: "Beginning at that time, and for long thereafter, the temple of Plebeia Pudicitia was equal in sanctity to the altar of the patricians, since no one could offer a sacrifice in it unless she were of singular chastity and had had only one husband..."

Political offices
| Preceded by Publius Decius Mus II and Quintus Fabius Maximus Rullianus III | Consul of the Roman Republic; 307 BC with Appius Claudius Caecus | Succeeded by Quintus Marcius Tremulus and Publius Cornelius Arvina |
| Preceded by Quintus Fabius Maximus Rullianus IV and Publius Decius Mus III | Consul of the Roman Republic; 296 BC with Appius Claudius Caecus II | Succeeded by Quintus Fabius Maximus Rullianus V and Publius Decius Mus IV |
