= 305 BC =

305 BC in various calendars
Gregorian calendar	305 BC; CCCV BC
Ab urbe condita	449
Ancient Egypt era	XXXIII dynasty, 19
Pharaoh	Ptolemy I Soter, 19
Ancient Greek Olympiad (summer)	118th Olympiad, year 4
Assyrian calendar	4446
Balinese saka calendar	N/A
Bengali calendar	−898 – −897
Berber calendar	646
Buddhist calendar	240
Burmese calendar	−942
Byzantine calendar	5204–5205
Chinese calendar	乙卯年 (Wood Rabbit); 2393 or 2186 — to — 丙辰年 (Fire Dragon); 2394 or 2187
Coptic calendar	−588 – −587
Discordian calendar	862
Ethiopian calendar	−312 – −311
Hebrew calendar	3456–3457
- Hindu calendars
Vikram Samvat	−248 – −247
Shaka Samvat	N/A
Kali Yuga	2796–2797
Holocene calendar	9696
Iranian calendar	926 BP – 925 BP
Islamic calendar	954 BH – 953 BH
Javanese calendar	N/A
Julian calendar	N/A
Korean calendar	2029
Minguo calendar	2216 before ROC 民前2216年
Nanakshahi calendar	−1772
Seleucid era	7/8 AG
Thai solar calendar	238–239
Tibetan calendar	阴木兔年 (female Wood-Rabbit) −178 or −559 or −1331 — to — 阳火龙年 (male Fire-Dragon) −177 or −558 or −1330

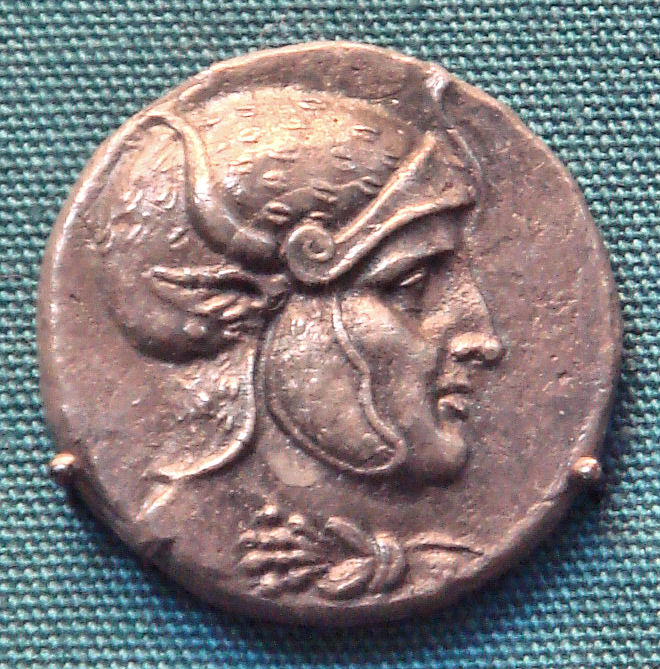
Coin of Seleucus I (305–281 BC)

The year 305 BC was a year of the pre-Julian Roman calendar. At the time, it was known as the Year of the Consulship of Megellus and Augurinus (or, less frequently, year 449 Ab urbe condita). The denomination 305 BC for this year has been used since the early medieval period, when the Anno Domini calendar era became the prevalent method in Europe for naming years.

== Events ==
=== By place ===
==== Seleucid Empire ====
- Seleucus, former officer of Alexander the Great, considers himself emperor of Persia. He attempts to recover lands taken by Chandragupta that had been a part of Alexander's Empire. Seleucus establishes Seleucia on the Tigris River as his capital.

==== Syria ====
- Antigonus I Monophthalmus sends his son Demetrius to initiate the Siege of Rhodes, as the city has refused him armed support against Ptolemy.

==== Italy ====
- The Romans defeat the Paeligni and take their land, some (those who look well disposed towards Rome) they grant citizenship.
- The Roman consuls, Marcus Fulvius Curvus Paetinus and Lucius Postumius Megellus, decisively defeat the Samnites in the Battle of Bovianum to end the Second Samnite War.

==== Sicily ====
- Agathocles, unable to come to terms with Deinocrates and the exiles, takes to the field with the remnants of his forces; at the Battle of Thorgium Agathocles defeats the much larger army of the exiles.
- Deinocrates comes to terms with Agathocles who appoints him a general over a part of his army.

== Births ==
- Zou Yan, Chinese philosopher (d. 240 BC)
- Arsinoe I, queen of Egypt

== Deaths ==
- Tiberius Minucius Augurinus
