= Lucius Genucius Aventinensis (consul 303 BC) =

Roman politician

Lucius Genucius Aventinensis was a Roman politician in the fourth century BC.

== Family ==
He was a member of gens Genucia. Gaius Genucius Clepsina and Lucius Genucius Clepsina, consul in 276 and 271 BC respectively, were likely his sons.

== Career ==
Genucius served as consul in 303 BC with Servius Cornelius Lentulus as his colleague. Six thousand Roman citizens were sent to the colonies of Alba Fucens in occupied Aequi territory, and Sora in the Samnite territory. The Hernici were upset by this, and were given Arpinum and Trebula as compensation.

Political offices
Preceded by Publius Sempronius Sophus and Publius Sulpicius Saverrio	Consul of the Roman Republic; 303 BC with Servius Cornelius Lentulus	Succeeded by Marcus Livius Denter and Marcus Aemilius Paullus
