= Genucius =

Genucius is a name. Notable people with the name include:

- Gnaeus Genucius Augurinus (died 396 BC), Roman consular tribune
- Lucius Genucius Aventinensis, Roman consul
- Lucius Genucius Aventinensis (consul 303 BC), Roman politician
- Titus Genucius Augurinus, Roman politician
- Gaius Genucius Clepsina, Roman politician
- Lucius Genucius Clepsina, Roman politician
