= Minucia gens =

Ancient Roman family

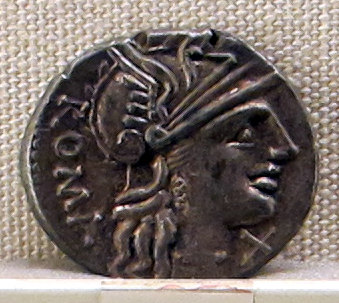
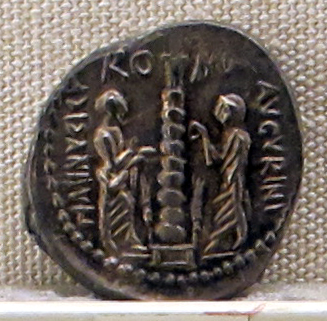
A denarius of the Minucia gens, depicting the head of Pallas on the obverse, and on the reverse a column honouring Lucius Minucius Augurinus, with the legend "C. Minuci. C. f. Augurini" (the minter of the coin).

The gens Minucia was an ancient Roman family, which flourished from the earliest days of the Republic until imperial times. The gens was apparently of patrician origin, but was better known by its plebeian branches. The first of the Minucii to hold the consulship was Marcus Minucius Augurinus, elected consul in 497 BC.

The nomen Minucius is frequently confounded with Minicius and Municius. The Minucii gave their name to the street known as the Via Minucia, the Pons Minucius, a bridge on the Via Flaminia, and a columned hall on the Campus Martius. The gate known as the Porticus Minucia was named after the consul of 110 BC.

== Praenomina ==
The Minucii used the praenomina Marcus, Publius, Quintus, Lucius, Tiberius, and Gaius. At least one early Minucius bore the praenomen Spurius. Other praenomina appear rarely, and only in the final centuries of the Republic.

== Branches and cognomina ==
The oldest branch of the family, the Minucii Augurini, were originally patrician, but in 439 BC Lucius Minucius Augurinus went over to the plebeians, and was elected tribune of the plebs. His descendants included the consul of 305 BC and several later tribunes of the plebs. The surname was derived from the position of augur, an important priest specializing in divination. The college of augurs was held in high esteem, and membership was restricted to the patricians until around 300 BC.

Some of the early Augurini bore the additional cognomen Esquilinus, presumably because they lived on the Esquiline Hill. Later surnames of the gens included Rufus, Thermus, and Basilus. The Minucii Rufi and Thermi appear from the latter part of the third century BC until the second half of the first century AD. Rufus means "red" and probably originally referred to someone with red hair. Thermus, a borrowing from Greek, might refer to a bath or hot springs.

The Minucii Basili appear only in the final century of the Republic. Their surname is derived from basileus, the Greek word for "king." Although frequently written Basilius, the best manuscripts give Basilus.

A number of plebeian Minucii had no cognomen.

== Members ==
This list includes abbreviated praenomina. For an explanation of this practice, see filiation.

=== Minucii Augurini ===
- Marcus Minucius Augurinus, consul in 497 BC, the year that the Saturnalia was instituted at Rome, and the Temple of Saturn dedicated. During his second consulship in 491, he defended Gaius Marcius Coriolanus, to no avail. Later, when Coriolanus returned at the head of a Volscian army, Minucius was one of the emissaries sent to meet with him.
- Publius Minucius Augurinus, consul in 492 BC, negotiated to purchase grain from various cities, in order to alleviate a famine at Rome.
- Lucius Minucius P. f. M. n. Esquilinus Augurinus, consul in 458 BC, commanded the Roman forces against the Aequi, but allowed himself to become surrounded. He was rescued by the dictator Lucius Quinctius Cincinnatus, who compelled him to resign the consulship. In 439, as praefectus annonae, he attempted to alleviate a famine by purchasing grain supplies from abroad and regulating grain prices. For his actions, the other patricians accused him of treason, and designing to make himself king; in response he went over to the plebeians, and was subsequently elected tribune of the plebs. (Note: The tradition that he was elected tribune immediately upon becoming a plebeian seems improbable, since there were already ten tribunes; but that he became a plebeian seems to be confirmed by the fact that several other Minucii were subsequently elected to this office.)
- Quintus Minucius P. f. M. n. Esquilinus Augurinus, consul in 457 BC. Given the command against the Sabines, he found the enemy safely shut within the walls of their towns, and so ravaged the countryside.
- Tiberius Minucius Augurinus, (Note: Or Titus, in Livy and Cassiodorus.) consul in 305 BC, at the end of the Second Samnite War. In some accounts, he was slain in battle.
- Marcus Minucius Augurinus, tribune of the plebs in 216 BC, introduced the bill for the creation of the triumviri mensarii.
- Gaius Minucius Augurinus, tribune of the plebs in 187 BC, accused Scipio Asiaticus of misappropriating part of the indemnity paid by Antiochus. When Scipio refused to give security, Minucius ordered his arrest, which was prevented through the intervention of Minucius' colleague, Tiberius Sempronius Gracchus.
- Tiberius Minucius Augurinus Molliculus, praetor peregrinus in 180 BC, died during the pestilence which visited Rome in that year.
- Gaius Minucius C. f. Augurinus, triumvir monetalis in 135 BC; from the imagery of his coins, he was likely a supporter of the Populares.
- Tiberius Minucius C. f. Augurinus, triumvir monetalis in 134 BC, younger brother of Gaius, and like him a Popularis.

=== Minucii Rufi ===
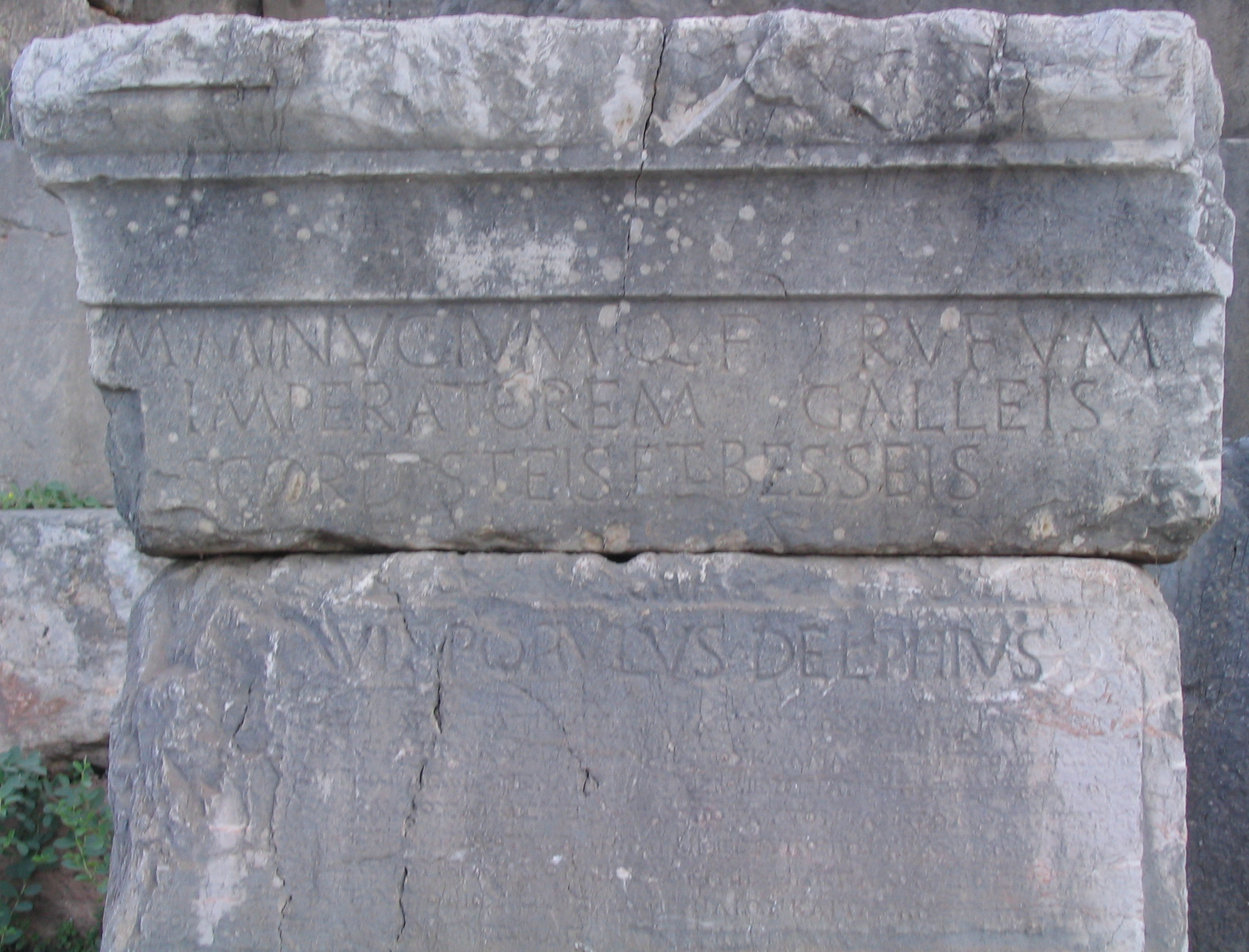
Dedication for Apollo at Delphi made by Marcus Minucius Rufus (proconsul in Macedonia in 106 BC), commemorating his victories.

- Marcus Minucius C. f. C. n. Rufus, consul in 221 BC, was magister equitum to the dictator Quintus Fabius Maximus Verrucosus in 217. He disagreed with the dictator's strategy, and defeated part of Hannibal's army, whereupon he asked the senate to grant him authority equal to the dictator's. He was slain at Cannae in 216.
- Quintus Minucius (Rufus), the legate of Marcus Claudius Marcellus during the siege of Capua in 210 BC, should probably be identified with Quintus Minucius Rufus, the consul of 197.
- Quintus Minucius C. f. C. n. Rufus, as praetor in 200 BC, he discovered a conspiracy in Bruttium. He was consul in 197, and successfully carried on the war against the Boii, but was refused a triumph by the senate, and so celebrated one on the Alban Mount. In 183 he was one of the ambassadors sent to the Gauls.
- Marcus Minucius Rufus, praetor peregrinus in 197 BC. He subsequently served as one of the commissioners to found a colony at Vibo in Bruttium, and was one of the ambassadors sent to Carthage in 193.
- Titus Minucius Rufus, served in the campaign against Perseus, king of Macedonia, in 171 BC.
- Marcus Minucius Q. f. Rufus, (Note: There is some uncertainty as to whether the tribune of the plebs and the consul of 110 are the same person; one of them might be Marcus' brother, Quintus Minucius Rufus.) tribune of the plebs in 121 BC, proposed the repeal of the laws of Gaius Sempronius Gracchus, in which he was opposed by Gracchus himself. He became consul in 110 BC, carried on the war against the barbarians in Thrace, and triumphed over the Scordisci and Triballi.
- Minucius Rufus, one of the commanders of the Roman fleet in the war against Mithridates.
- Quintus Minucius Rufus, an eques at Syracuse, who opposed Verres and later appeared as one of the witnesses against him.
- Minucius Rufus, a partisan of Gnaeus Pompeius during the civil war, was one of the commanders of the fleet at Oricum. He may have been the same Minucius who was praetor in 43 BC, and who perished in the proscription.
- Lucius Minicius Rufus, consul in AD 88, with the emperor Domitian, probably should be Lucius Minicius Rufus.

=== Minucii Thermi ===
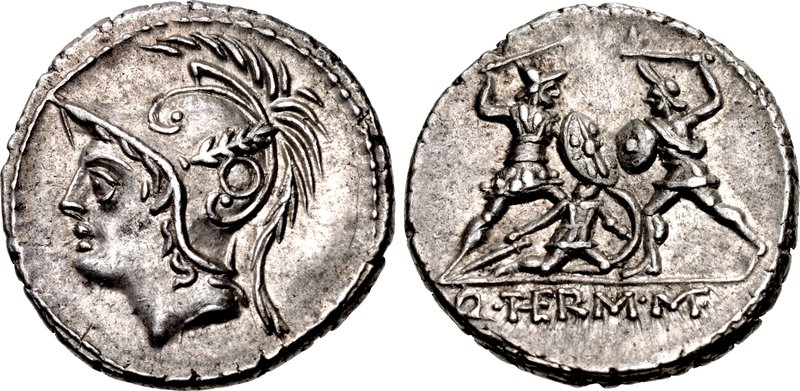
Denarius of Quintus Minucius Thermus, 103 BC. The obverse depicts the head of Mars. The reverse shows a Roman soldier fighting a barbarian and protecting an injured comrade – a reference to a military exploit of one of his ancestors.

- Quintus Minucius Q. f. L. n. Thermus, a military tribune in the army of Scipio Africanus in 202 BC. Praetor in 196, he received a triumph for his victories in Hispania Citerior. He was consul in 193 BC, and sent to quell an insurrection by the Ligures, whom he defeated as proconsul in 191. He was slain in battle against the Thracians in 188.
- Lucius Minucius Q. f. L. n. Thermus, served with his brother under Scipio Asiaticus, in the Roman–Seleucid War in 189 BC. In 182 and 181, he was legate to the praetor Quintus Fulvius Flaccus in Hispania Citerior. When examined by the senate as to the state of the province, his account differed from that given by Flaccus. In 178, he was legate to the consul Aulus Manlius Vulso in Istria.
- Quintus Minucius M. f. Thermus, triumvir monetalis in 103 BC, was quaestor at some point before 89. In 86, he accompanied the consul Lucius Valerius Flaccus into Asia, where Flaccus left him in command of the troops; but soon afterwards, Gaius Flavius Fimbria deprived him of his command.
- Marcus Minucius Thermus, praetor in 81 BC. He was Caesar's commander during the siege of Mytilene.
- (Minucius) Thermus, a candidate for the consulship of 64 BC, probably identical with the consul of that year, Gaius Marcius Figulus, having perhaps been adopted just before the election.
- Aulus Minucius Thermus, twice defended by Cicero in 59 BC. He had previously held a magistracy, but which is unknown, and had been popular.
- Quintus Minucius Q. f. M. n. Thermus, senator in 73 BC, praetor during the 50s, then propraetor in 51 and 50, and a partisan of Gnaeus Pompeius. Sent to occupy Iguvium, he retreated before the approach of Gaius Scribonius Curio. He was later a supporter of Sextus Pompeius, but went over to Marcus Antonius in 35.
- Minucius Thermus, a friend of Sejanus, put to death by the emperor Tiberius in AD 32.
- Minucius Thermus, a man of praetorian rank, was sacrificed by Nero in AD 66, to the hatred of Gaius Ofonius Tigellinus.

=== Minucii Basili ===
- Lucius Minucius, triumvir monetalis in 133 BC, probably father of the military tribune of 86 BC.
- Lucius Minucius L. f. Basilus, a military tribune under Sulla in 86 BC, during the campaign against Archelaus.
- Marcus Minucius Basilus, mentioned by Cicero in his oration, pro Cluentio.
- Minucius Basilus, buried along the Via Appia. His tomb was a spot infamous for robberies.
- Lucius Minucius Basilus, the uncle of Marcus Satrius, whom he adopted in his will.
- Lucius Minucius Basilus, born Marcus Satrius, one of Caesar's lieutenants during the Gallic Wars; during the Civil War, he commanded part of Caesar's fleet. Notwithstanding their long friendship, he was one of Caesar's assassins in 44 BC. He was murdered by his own slaves the following year.
- Minucius Basilus, attacked by Cicero as a friend of Marcus Antonius, in the second Philippic.

=== Others ===
- Spurius Minucius, pontifex maximus in 420 BC.
- Marcus Minucius, tribune of the plebs in 401 BC, impeached two of the consular tribunes of the previous year for misconduct in the war with Veii.
- Minucia, one of the Vestal Virgins in 337 BC.
- Marcus Minucius Faesus, one of the first augurs elected from the plebs after the extension of the lex de Sacerdotiis in 300 BC.
- Publius Minucius (Q. f.), one of two Minucii who served as military tribunes under the consul Lucius Cornelius Merula, in the war with the Boii, 193 BC.
- Quintus Minucius Q. f., one of two Minucii who served as military tribunes under the consul Lucius Cornelius Merula, in the war with the Boii, 193 BC. He then became ambassador in 174 and was praetor circa 164.
- Minucius, died intestate before Gaius Verres became praetor urbanus, in 75 or 74 BC. Verres interfered with the inheritance of his property by his gens, an action which Cicero derided in his oration, In Verrem.
- Gaius Minucius Reginus, a partisan of Pompeius during the Civil War, he was prefect of Zeta in 46 BC.
- Gnaeus Minucius, a person about whose political opinions Cicero wrote to Cornificius in 43 BC.
- Minucius Pacatus, better known as Irenaeus, an Alexandrian grammarian, probably in the time of Augustus.
- Minucius Macrinus, enrolled by Vespasian among those of praetorian rank, should probably be Minicius Macrinus.
- Minucius Acilianus, the son of Macrinus, and a friend of the younger Pliny, who had held the ranks of quaestor, tribune, and praetor, probably should be Minicius Acilianus.
- Minucius Pacatus Irenaeus, a first-century Greek grammarian.
- Minucius Natalis, also found as Minitius, from the time of Trajan, appears to be Lucius Minicius Natalis, consul suffectus in AD 106.
- Marcus Minucius Felix, a lawyer and Christian apologist of the second or third century.

== See also ==
- List of Roman gentes

== Bibliography ==
- Polybius, Historiae (The Histories).
- Gaius Julius Caesar, Commentarii de Bello Gallico (Commentaries on the Gallic War), Commentarii de Bello Civili (Commentaries on the Civil War), De Bello Africo (On the African War, attributed).
- Marcus Tullius Cicero, De Officiis, Epistulae ad Atticum, Epistulae ad Familiares, In Verrem, Philippicae, Pro Cluentio, Pro Flacco.
- Gaius Sallustius Crispus (Sallust), Bellum Jugurthinum (The Jugurthine War).
- Diodorus Siculus, Bibliotheca Historica (Library of History).
- Dionysius of Halicarnassus, Romaike Archaiologia (Roman Antiquities).
- Titus Livius (Livy), History of Rome.
- Marcus Velleius Paterculus, Compendium of Roman History.
- Valerius Maximus, Factorum ac Dictorum Memorabilium (Memorable Facts and Sayings).
- Quintus Asconius Pedianus, Commentarius in Oratio Ciceronis Pro Milone (Commentary on Cicero's Oration Pro Milone).
- Gaius Plinius Secundus (Pliny the Elder), Naturalis Historia (Natural History).
- Gaius Plinius Caecilius Secundus (Pliny the Younger), Epistulae (Letters).
- Sextus Julius Frontinus, Strategemata (Stratagems).
- Lucius Annaeus Florus, Epitome de T. Livio Bellorum Omnium Annorum DCC (Epitome of Livy: All the Wars of Seven Hundred Years).
- Publius Cornelius Tacitus, Annales.
- Plutarchus, Lives of the Noble Greeks and Romans.
- Appianus Alexandrinus (Appian), Bella Mithridatica (The Mithridatic Wars), Bellum Civile (The Civil War), Bellum Hannibalicum (The War with Hannibal), Hispanica (The Spanish Wars), Punica (The Punic Wars), Syriaca (The Syrian Wars).
- Sextus Pompeius Festus, Epitome de M. Verrio Flacco de Verborum Significatu (Epitome of Marcus Verrius Flaccus: On the Meaning of Words).
- Aulus Gellius, Noctes Atticae (Attic Nights).
- Lucius Cassius Dio Cocceianus (Cassius Dio), Roman History.
- Sextus Aurelius Victor, De Viris Illustribus (On Famous Men).
- Eutropius, Breviarium Historiae Romanae (Abridgement of the History of Rome).
- Paulus Orosius, Historiarum Adversum Paganos (History Against the Pagans).
- Suda.
- Joannes Zonaras, Epitome Historiarum (Epitome of History).
- Barthold Georg Niebuhr, The History of Rome, Julius Charles Hare and Connop Thirlwall, trans., John Smith, Cambridge (1828).
- Henricus Meyerus, Oratorum Romanorum Fragmenta ab Appio inde Caeco usque ad Q. Aurelium Symmachum (Fragments of Roman Orators from Appius Claudius Caecus to Quintus Aurelius Symmachus), L. Bourgeois-Mazé, Paris (1837).
- Dictionary of Greek and Roman Biography and Mythology, William Smith, ed., Little, Brown and Company, Boston (1849).
- Theodor Mommsen et alii, Corpus Inscriptionum Latinarum (The Body of Latin Inscriptions, abbreviated CIL), Berlin-Brandenburgische Akademie der Wissenschaften (1853–present).
- Wilhelm Dittenberger, Sylloge Inscriptionum Graecarum (Collection of Greek Inscriptions, abbreviated SIG), Leipzig (1883).
- Hermann Dessau, Inscriptiones Latinae Selectae (Selection of Latin Inscriptions, abbreviated ILS), Berlin (1892–1916).
- George Davis Chase, "The Origin of Roman Praenomina", in Harvard Studies in Classical Philology, vol. VIII (1897).
- Broughton, T. Robert S. (1952–1986). The Magistrates of the Roman Republic. American Philological Association.
- Michael Crawford, Roman Republican Coinage, Cambridge University Press (1974, 2001).
