= Manius Curius Dentatus =

3rd-century BC Roman general and statesman

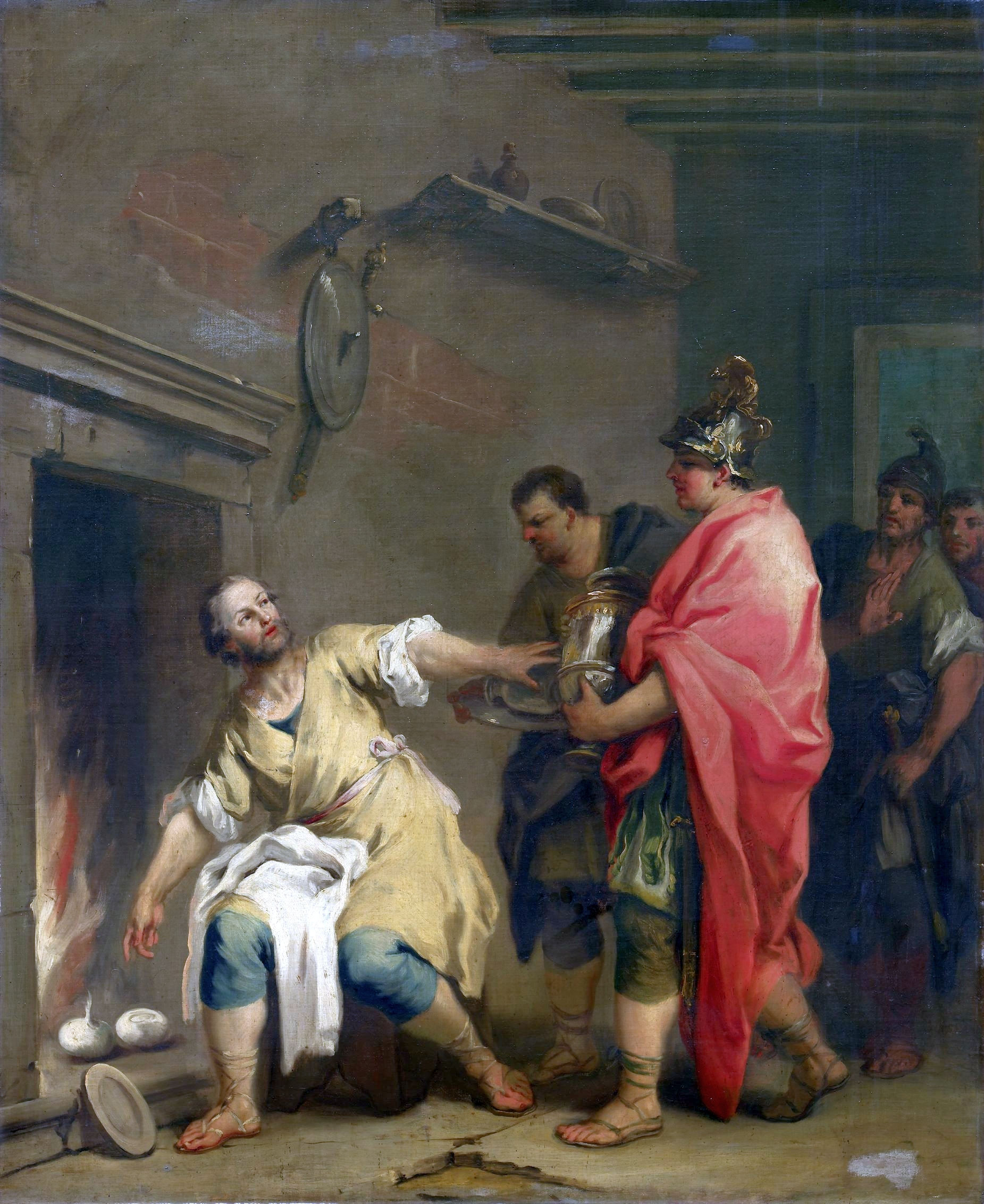
- Curius Dentatus refusing wealth in favour of a turnip, as depicted by Jacopo Amigoni
- Died: 270 BC
- Occupations: Roman general, statesman

Manius Curius Dentatus (died 270 BC) was a Roman general and statesman noted for ending the Samnite War and for his military exploits during the Pyrrhic War. According to Pliny, he was born with teeth, thus earning the surname Dentatus, "toothed."

Dentatus was a tribune of the plebs sometime between 298 and 291 BC. As tribune, he foiled efforts by the interrex Appius Claudius Caecus to keep plebeian candidates out of the consular elections. If his tribunate is dated to 291, his actions advanced his own candidacy, but since Appius served three times as interrex, the earliest date accords better with the timeline of Dentatus's own career.

Dentatus served his first term as consul in 290 BC, with a colleague by the name of P. Cornelius Rufinus (cos. 290 and 277 BC, dict. 276 BC and ancestor of Lucius Cornelius Sulla Felix the dictator) during which time he defeated both the Samnites and Sabines and celebrated two triumphs. Returning home he took on a massive public works project, partly draining Lake Velinus.

In 283, Dentatus filled the praetorship (or possibly the consulship) of L. Caecilius Metellus Denter after the latter was killed in the Battle of Arretium. Polybius says Dentatus drove the Gauls from their territory, clearing the way for the establishment of a colony at Sena.

As consul again in 275 BC, Dentatus fought Pyrrhus in the inconclusive Battle of Beneventum which nevertheless forced Pyrrhus out of Italy. As a result, he held a consecutive consulship, defeating the Lucani in the following year and earning an ovation. He was censor in 272, and in 270 he and Lucius Papirius Cursor were elected commissioners to oversee construction of the Anio Vetus, Rome's second aqueduct, for which he used his personal share of the booty from his recent victories. He died during the project, which was completed under his fellow commissioner M. Fulvius Flaccus.

Dentatus is described as having been incorruptible and frugal; the story was that when the Samnites sent ambassadors with expensive gifts in an attempt to influence him in their favor, they found him sitting by the hearth roasting turnips. He refused the gifts, saying that he preferred ruling the possessors of gold over possessing it himself. Although the truth of this story is unclear — it may have been an invention of Cato — it was the inspiration for a number of paintings by Jacopo Amigoni, Govert Flinck, and others.

His praenomen is sometimes given erroneously as Marcus because the standard abbreviation of Manius (M'.) is confused with the M. that abbreviates Marcus.

The Dutch Study Association 'S.V.T.B. Curius' at Delft University of Technology and its sub-association Dentatus are named after him.

== Sources ==
- Cicero, De Senectute, 16
- Eutropius, ii. 9, 14
- Florus, ii. 18
- Juvenal, xi. 78
- Livy, Epitome, 11-14
- Pliny, vii. 16
- Plutarch, Life of Pyrrhus, §25
- Polybius, ii. 19
- Seneca, De Consolatione ad Helviam Matrem 10.8
- Valerius Maximus, iv. 3, 5, vi. 3, 4

== Notes ==
Political offices
| Preceded by Lucius Postumius Megellus III; Gaius Junius Bubulcus Brutus | Roman consul 290 BC with Publius Cornelius Rufinus | Succeeded by Marcus Valerius Maximus Corvinus II; Quintus Caedicius Noctua |
| Preceded by Quintus Fabius Maximus Gurges II; Gaius Genucius Clepsina | Roman consul II; 275 BC with Lucius Cornelius Lentulus Caudinus | Succeeded by himself Servius Cornelius Merenda |
| Preceded by himself Lucius Cornelius Lentulus Caudinus | Roman consul III; 274 BC with Servius Cornelius Merenda | Succeeded by Gaius Fabius Licinus; Gaius Claudius Canina II |
