= Publius Cornelius Arvina =

Late 4th/early 3rd century BC Roman politician and general

Publius Cornelius Arvina was a Roman politician and general who lived in the late 4th century and early 3rd century BC, who served as consul of the Roman Republic twice, and as censor once.

== Family ==
Arvina was a member of the illustrious patrician gens of the Cornelii, a family which created many important figures throughout the Roman Republic and into the Roman Empire. In particular, Arvina was a member of the branch of the Cornelii Cossi, which was descended from the 5th century Roman hero Aulus Cornelius Cossus, who achieved great renown by personally slaying Lars Tolumnius, the king of Veii, becoming one of only three Romans in recorded history to win the rare honor of the Spolia opima. Arvina was the son of Aulus Cornelius Cossus Arvina, who himself had an illustrious career in the mid 4th century, achieving the consulate twice and becoming dictator once.

== First consulship ==
In 306 BC, Arvina was elected as consul for the first time, serving alongside Quintus Marcius Tremulus. In this year, the Second Samnite War, which had been raging for twenty years at this point, continued, with the Samnites having just retaken the Roman occupied cities of Calatia and Sora by storm. Additionally, the Hernici, who were allies of the Samnites, had been caught supplying them with troops the previous year, and thus declared war on Rome. In order to combat these two enemies, the Senate assigned Arvina to fight the Samnites and Marcius to take on the Hernici. Arvina's campaign against the Samnites did not start off well, as despite his force outnumbering that of his Samnite opponents, the Samnites blocked roads and took mountain passes, blocking the Romans' supply lines in an attempt to starve them into submission. Thus even when Arvina challenged for battle, which was often, the Samnites refused every single time, knowing that a battle would likely result in their defeat and that it would be far less risky to just wait until the Romans starved enough to come to the bargaining table. Upon hearing of his colleague's predicament, Marcius, who had already finished subduing the Hernici, came to the relief of Arvina. Upon hearing of the approach of the second consular army, the Samnites knew that they could not withstand two Roman armies attacking at once, so they attempted to attack the force of Marcius before he could come to the aid of Arvina. Upon noticing the advance of the Samnites, Marcius ordered his men to get into battle formation, and battle was commenced. Upon seeing the cloud of dust caused by the motion of the Samnites, Arvina ordered his men to advance on the Samnite flank, which the men, not wanting the glory of victory to fall to the other army in both campaigns, did with great vigor, charging into the enemy lines. Thus, the battle became a rout, as the Samnites fled the field in droves, with up to thirty thousand Samnite men being killed. After the battle, Arvina remained in Samnium, while Marcius returned to Rome to celebrate his triumph over his victory against the Hernici.

== Censorship and Second Consulship ==
In 294 BC, Arvina served as Censor alongside Gaius Marcius Rutilus Censorinus. In their term, Arvina and Rutilus conducted the census, counting 262,321 Roman citizens.

In 288 BC, Arvina was elected consul for a second time, once again with Quintus Marcius Tremulus as his colleague. As Livy, the main source for early Roman history, is not extant for this period, nothing is known of the actions taken during his consulship, however, it is likely that during this year there was much popular unrest, as the final plebeian secession occurred the next year.

== Bibliography ==
- Broughton, T. Robert S., The Magistrates of the Roman Republic, American Philological Association (1952)
- Livy (Titus Livius), Ab Urbe Condita Libri

Political offices
Preceded by Appius Claudius Caecus; Lucius Volumnius Flamma Violens	Roman consul 306 BC; With: Quintus Marcius Tremulus	Succeeded by Lucius Postumius Megellus; Tiberius Minucius Augurinus
Preceded by Marcus Valerius Maximus Corvinus; Quintus Caedicius Noctua	Roman consul II; 288 BC; With: Quintus Marcius Tremulus II	Succeeded by Marcus Claudius Marcellus; Gaius Nautius Rutilus
