= Publius Cornelius Rufinus (consul 290 BC) =

Roman senator and general

Publius Cornelius Rufinus was a Roman politician and general of the third century BC.

He is often thought to be a son of Publius Cornelius Rufinus, dictator in 334 BC, but this is impossible because the Fasti Capitolini say that his father was a certain Gnaeus Cornelius Rufinus and his grandfather was Publius Cornelius Rufinus, probably the dictator (note the 44-year gap in between Publius the Elder's dictatorship and Publius the Younger's first consulship).

Rufinus was consul twice and dictator once, the latter in an unknown year. He brought the Samnite War to an end in his first consulship, in 290 BC, with his colleague Manius Curius Denatus. In the elections of 277 BC, Gaius Fabricius Luscinus, consul the previous year, was an opponent of Rufinus but voted for him anyway, seeing that Rufinus was the only candidate with military genius. When Rufinus thanked him for the support, or when the people inquired why he voted for his opponent, Fabricius replied, "I would rather be robbed by a fellow countryman than sold by the enemy [as a slave]."

Rufinus took up arms again because of the vulnerability of the enemy, in his second consulship in 277 BC, in which he captured the towns of Croton and Locri, but his reputation suffered severely because of his avarice and cruelty. Two years later, Rufinus was expelled from the senate by Fabricius, who was censor at the time, when he was found to have possessed over ten librae (or pounds) of silver plate.

He was also the great-great-great grandfather of the dictator Lucius Cornelius Sulla, and a father of Publius Cornelius Sulla, Flamen Dialis c. 250 BC.

== See also ==
- Cornelia gens

Political offices
Preceded by Lucius Postumius Megellus; Gaius Junius Bubulcus Brutus	Roman consul 290 BC; With: Manius Curius Dentatus	Succeeded by Marcus Valerius Maximus Corvinus; Quintus Caedicius Noctua
Preceded by Gaius Fabricius Luscinus II; Quintus Aemilius Papus II	Roman consul II; 277 BC; With: Gaius Junius Bubulcus Brutus II	Succeeded by Q. Fabius Maximus Gurges II; Gaius Genucius Clepsina
