= Scantia gens =

Ancient Roman family

The gens Scantia was a minor plebeian family at ancient Rome. Few members of this gens occur in history, and none of them attained any of the higher offices of the Roman state, but a number are known from inscriptions.

== Origin ==
All that can be said with certainty about the nomen Scantius is that it seems to share a common root with several other nomina, such as Scandilius, Scantilius, and Scantinius, which were either formed directly from it using the common gentile-forming suffixes -ilius and -inius, or from related cognomina, such as Scandillus, Scantillus, or Scantinus, of which only the feminine Scantilla is known from history or inscriptions; the wife of Didius Julianus was Manlia Scantilla.

== Members ==
- Marcus Scantius, (Note: Cantius in some manuscripts.) tribune of the plebs in 293 BC, attempted to prosecute Lucius Postumius Megellus, who had been consul the previous year. This action was thwarted when Megellus was appointed legate to the consul Spurius Carvilius Maximus, and no further attempt was made to prosecute Megellus.
- Scantius, one of the characters referred to in Varro's Eumenides, evidently a Menippean satire of which only fragments remain. In the fragment referring to him, Scantius appears to have written something about the Dionysia.
- Scantia, a woman forced to surrender her house to Publius Clodius Pulcher, who threatened her life.
- Scantia, one of the Vestal Virgins, who died or retired in AD 23, during the reign of Tiberius, and was succeeded by Cornelia.

== See also ==
- List of Roman gentes

== Bibliography ==
- Marcus Tullius Cicero, Pro Milone.
- Titus Livius (Livy), History of Rome.
- Publius Cornelius Tacitus, Annales.
- Aelius Lampridius, Aelius Spartianus, Flavius Vopiscus, Julius Capitolinus, Trebellius Pollio, and Vulcatius Gallicanus, Historia Augusta (Augustan History).
- Dictionary of Greek and Roman Biography and Mythology, William Smith, ed., Little, Brown and Company, Boston (1849).
- Theodor Mommsen et alii, Corpus Inscriptionum Latinarum (The Body of Latin Inscriptions, abbreviated CIL), Berlin-Brandenburgische Akademie der Wissenschaften (1853–present).
- George Davis Chase, "The Origin of Roman Praenomina", in Harvard Studies in Classical Philology, vol. VIII, pp. 103–184 (1897).
- T. Robert S. Broughton, The Magistrates of the Roman Republic, American Philological Association (1952–1986).
