= Lucius Postumius Megellus (consul 305 BC) =

Ancient Roman general and statesman (c. 345 BC – c. 260 BC)

Consul of the Roman Republic
- In office January 305 BC – December 305 BC Serving with Tiberius Minucius Augurinus
- Preceded by: Quintus Marcius Tremulus and Publius Cornelius Arvina
- Succeeded by: Publius Sempronius Sophus and Publius Sulpicius Saverrio
- In office January 294 BC – December 294 BC Serving with Marcus Atilius Regulus
- Preceded by: Quintus Fabius Maximus Rullianus and Publius Decius Mus
- Succeeded by: Lucius Papirius Cursor and Spurius Carvilius Maximus
- In office January 291 BC – December 291 BC Serving with Gaius Junius Bubulcus Brutus
- Preceded by: Quintus Fabius Maximus Gurges and Decimus Junius Brutus Scaeva (consul 292)
- Succeeded by: Publius Cornelius Rufinus and Manius Curius Dentatus

Personal details
- Born: c. 345 BC
- Died: c. 260 BC

Military service
- Allegiance: Roman Empire
- Battles/wars: Second Samnite War; Battle of Bovianum; Third Samnite War; Battle of Aquilonia; Siege of Cominium

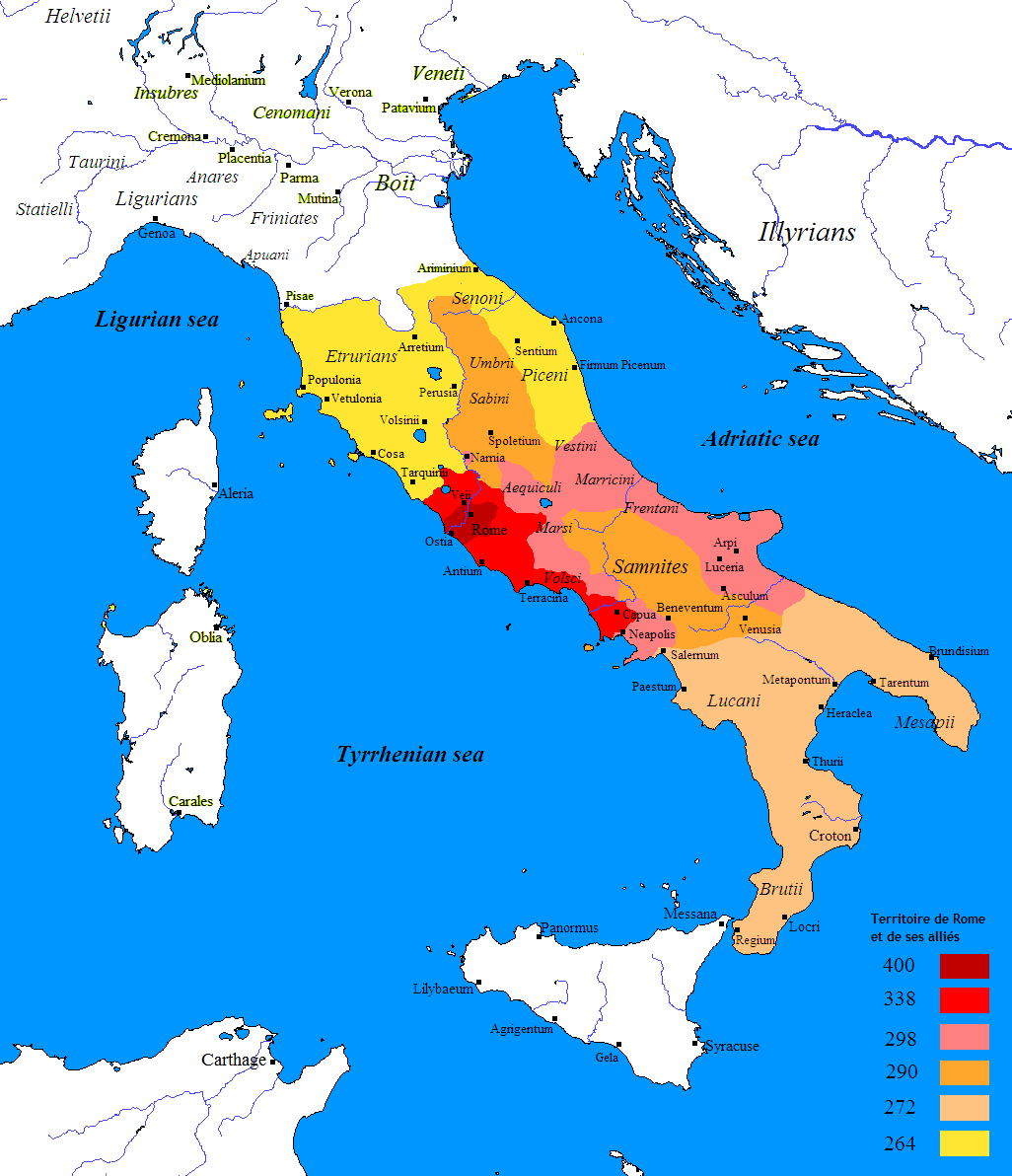
The expansion of the Roman Republic during the 4th and 3rd centuries BC

Lucius Postumius Megellus (c. 345 BC – c. 260 BC) was a politician and general during the middle years of the Roman Republic. Reportedly an arrogant and overbearing man, he was elected consul in 305 BC. The Second Samnite War was ongoing, and as consul he led troops against the Samnites. He defeated them at the Battle of Bovianum and took the town of Bovianum, which caused the Samnites to sue for peace, ending the war. Megellus was awarded a triumph.

Six years later the Third Samnite War broke out. Megellus again served in a senior role, but saw little fighting and after a year his army was disbanded. In 294 he was elected consul for a second time. He led a consular army but was defeated, wounded and driven away. Recovering he led out another army and captured two towns. He then celebrated a second triumph in defiance of the senate's wishes. Only his subsequent participation in the victorious Battle of Aquilonia prevented his prosecution.

Two years later, as the war was drawing to a close, Megellus held the office which oversaw the consular elections. He exploited this to have himself elected consul, in spite of the law requiring a ten-year gap. Amidst furious arguments with his fellow consul, one of the previous year's consuls and the senate he carried the Siege of Cominium to a successful conclusion. With the war all but over he returned to Rome demanding a third triumph. This was refused, and when he left office he was tried for malfeasance and given an enormous fine.

== Family ==
Megellus was a member of the patrician Postumia clan, a family reportedly at the forefront of the so-called Struggle of the Orders in their attempts to prevent the opening up of the political offices to the plebeian classes. He had at least one son, also known as Lucius Postumius Megellus, who was elected consul in the third year of the First Punic War.

== First consulship ==
Megellus’ career was marked by overbearing and oppressive behaviour in his dealings with his fellow magistrates and with the citizens of the Republic. His political progress was closely entwined with his military role in the ongoing Samnite Wars, which gave him the scope to ascend to the highest levels of political office, and use his victories to further his career, regardless of the law; for example his disregard of the Lex Genucia to claim the consulship for the third time in 291.

Megellus first came to prominence during his time as Curule Aedile, c. 307 BC. The office of the aedilis was generally held by young men intending to follow the cursus honorum, the sequential mixture of military and political administrative positions held by aspiring politicians in the Roman Republic. As an aedile, Megellus heavily fined (pecunia multaticia) any individuals who broke the Lex Licinia Sextia by encroaching on public land. With the fines he collected, Megellus promised to build a temple dedicated to the goddess Victory, a promise he fulfilled in 294 BC.

His election as consul in 305 BC saw him participate in the closing years of the Second Samnite War. Leading the armies of the Republic, according to Livy he defeated the Samnites at the Battle of Bovianum and took the town of Bovianum. Returning to Rome, Megellus and his consular colleague Marcus Fulvius Curvus Paetinus took the towns of Sora, Arpinum and Cerennia. Livy stated that Megellus received a triumph for his victory. The capture of Bovianum caused the Samnites to sue for peace in 304 BC, ending the Second Samnite War.

== Second consulship ==
With the resumption of hostilities in 298, Rome was soon in need of experienced military commanders to take the field against a coalition of enemies, with the Samnites to the south in league with the Etruscans, Umbrians and Gauls to the north. Magellus, now a private citizen was ineligible to serve again as consul due to the lex Genucia, which required a ten-year interval before a previous consul could hold the office again. Therefore, in 295 BC, with Rome under threat of imminent invasion, he was granted the powers of a Propraetor as a privatus cum imperio. He was given command of a legion stationed on the ager Vaticanus, the right hand side of the Tiber. As part of the campaign that culminated in the Battle of Sentinum, Magellus was ordered to attack the Etruscans, in particular the armies and territory around the town of Clusium. It is believed that he was not involved in any serious campaigning, and returned to Rome shortly afterwards where his army was disbanded.

Elected consul for the second time in 294 BC, Megellus was given command of the forces on the southern front. He captured several towns in Samnium, but in Apulia he was routed and put to flight, and after being wounded he was driven into Luceria with a few of his men. Returning to Rome to recover from his wounds, he dedicated the temple of Victory in Rome, built with the fines exacted during his curule aedileship. When he had recovered, he again returned to campaign in Samnium, where he captured the towns of Milionia and Ferentinum. Contradictory accounts have Megellus also campaigning in Etruria in 294 BC, but these are usually discounted by modern scholars. At the end of the campaigning season he celebrated a triumph over the Samnites. This triumph was notorious, as his senatorial enemies claimed that he was not entitled to one, as he had technically left the province which the Senate had assigned to him, during his return to Rome. Disregarding the opposition, he celebrated it without the Senate's permission, which was customary, earning him a good deal of enmity.

== Third consulship ==
As soon as he left the office on 1 January 293, Megellus was immediately threatened with impeachment for his actions as consul by one of the tribunes, Marcus Cantius. With the ongoing crisis of the Samnite war, however, his military ability meant that he was desperately needed. Consequently, he was appointed legatus, a high military office, to the consul Spurius Carvilius Maximus, and agreement was reached to suspend his prosecution until the end of the campaigning season. However, the victories achieved by Carvilius Maximus, especially the Battle of Aquilonia, at which Megellus fought, resulted in the trial never taking place, as his opponents believed that his popularity meant that he would have inevitably been found innocent.

At the end of 292, Megellus was appointed interrex in order to convene the Comitia Curiata and hold the consular elections. This office gave its holder the most senior position in Rome for the duration of the elections. During the election process, with the war against Samnium virtually won, he took the highly unusual step of nominating himself, thereby breaking the law prohibiting men serving as consul again until ten years had elapsed. Upon winning and entering office as senior consul in 291 BC, his first act was to demand that Samnium be assigned to him as his theatre of war, without waiting for the outcome of the drawing of lots for the provincial commands. Over the strenuous objections of his colleague Gaius Junius Bubulcus Brutus, who in the end decided not to impose his veto, Megellus’ request was granted. He then levied troops for that year's campaigning season, even though Samnite resistance was almost completely crushed, and the previous year's consul, Quintus Fabius Maximus Gurges was still in the field with an army which he was commanding with proconsular authority. Regardless, he took his army into the field and marched to the borders of Samnium.

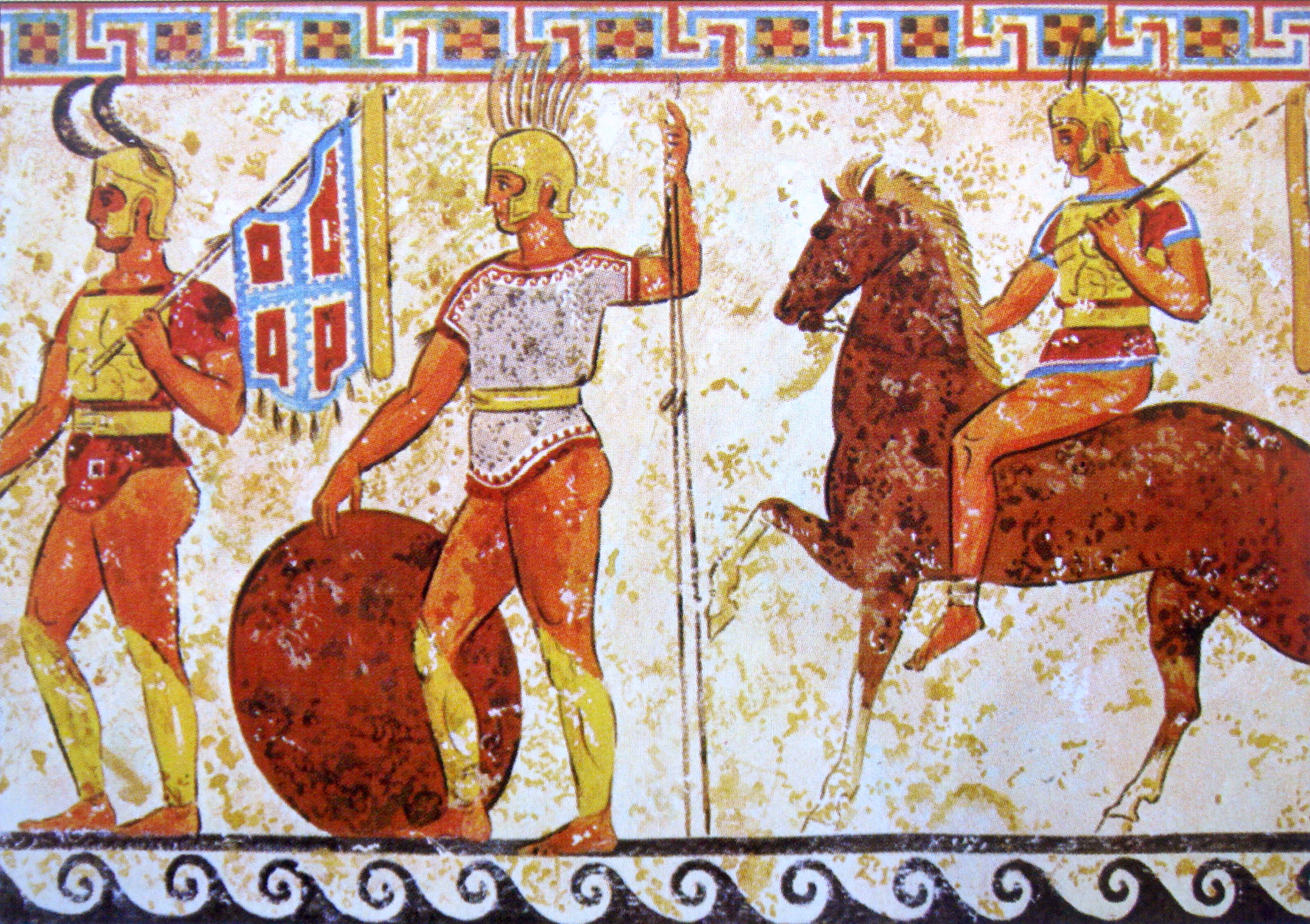
Samnite soldiers from a tomb frieze in Nola, 4th century BC

Over the course of the last two years, Megellus had acquired large tracts of uncleared land from the Samnites which, although they were technically public land, he treated as his own. Instead of immediately going to join Gurges, who was besieging Cominium, he used some 2,000 of his soldiers to begin clearing the land, which he had them do for some considerable time, before moving to finally join Gurges. According to Dionysius of Halicarnassus, a jealous Megellus prevented Gurges from taking the Samnite stronghold of Cominium. Approaching the town, Megellus wrote to Gurges, ordering him to withdraw from Samnium. Gurges declined, declaring his command had been given to him by the Senate, and wrote to Rome, asking the Senate to confirm his command. The Senate sent a delegation of senators to Megellus, stating that he was not to countermand the Senate's decree. He responded to the deputation that, as long as he was the duly elected consul of Rome, it was up to him to command the Senate, not for the Senate to dictate to him how he was to go about his duties. He then marched on to Cominium, and forced Gurges to stand down from his command. Gurges had no choice but to obey, and Megellus, having taken command of both armies, immediately sent Gurges back to Rome. Cominium quickly fell, and he followed this up with a campaign against the Hirpini, followed by the capture of Venusia.

With Venusia taken, Megellus recommended that the Senate should turn it into a Roman colony. Although the Senate followed his advice, they were swayed by the Fabii, who were the enemies of Megellus, and refused to appoint him as one of the commissioners responsible for assigning the lands to the colonists and overseeing the foundation of the new settlement. Infuriated, Megellus decided to distribute all the plunder of the campaign amongst his soldiers, in order to prevent the Treasury of Rome getting any of the booty. Further, he disbanded his armies before his successor arrived to relieve him. Returning to Rome, he demanded another triumph for his victories, which the Senate refused to grant him. He petitioned the people to support him, but he only received lukewarm support. He then turned to the Plebeian Tribunes, and although he had the support of three, the other seven vetoed his request for a triumph. The senate instead voted a triumph for the man he ousted, Quintus Fabius Maximus Gurges, allowing him to claim credit for the capture of Cominium. (Note: There is confusion in both Livy’s and Dionysius of Halicarnassus’s accounts, with very similar events (Megellus’ demanding of a triumph, his decision to triumph in spite of Senatorial opposition, his use of the Plebeian Tribunes to further his goals) occurring after his second and third consulships, in 294 and 291 BC respectively. Scholars are divided as to whether a) the events are confused, occurring in one year only, most likely in 294 (based on the Fasti stating that it was Gurges not Megellus who received the triumph in 291 and that Megellus triumphed in 294), or b) whether two similar events were conflated. To make sense of the evidence, it appears that Megellus did demand a triumph in 294, which he staged in spite of Senatorial opposition. He then tried the same tactic again in 291; but this time he had disbanded his troops before his return to Rome, and the Plebeian tribunes interposed their veto to prevent his triumph. Given that the war was virtually over by the end of 291, and therefore the need to keep his military services available for the state was not as pressing, no further attempts were made to accommodate Megellus’ increasingly erratic behaviour. Salmon, pg, 275; Arnold, pg, 394; Forsythe, pg. 327)

== Later career ==
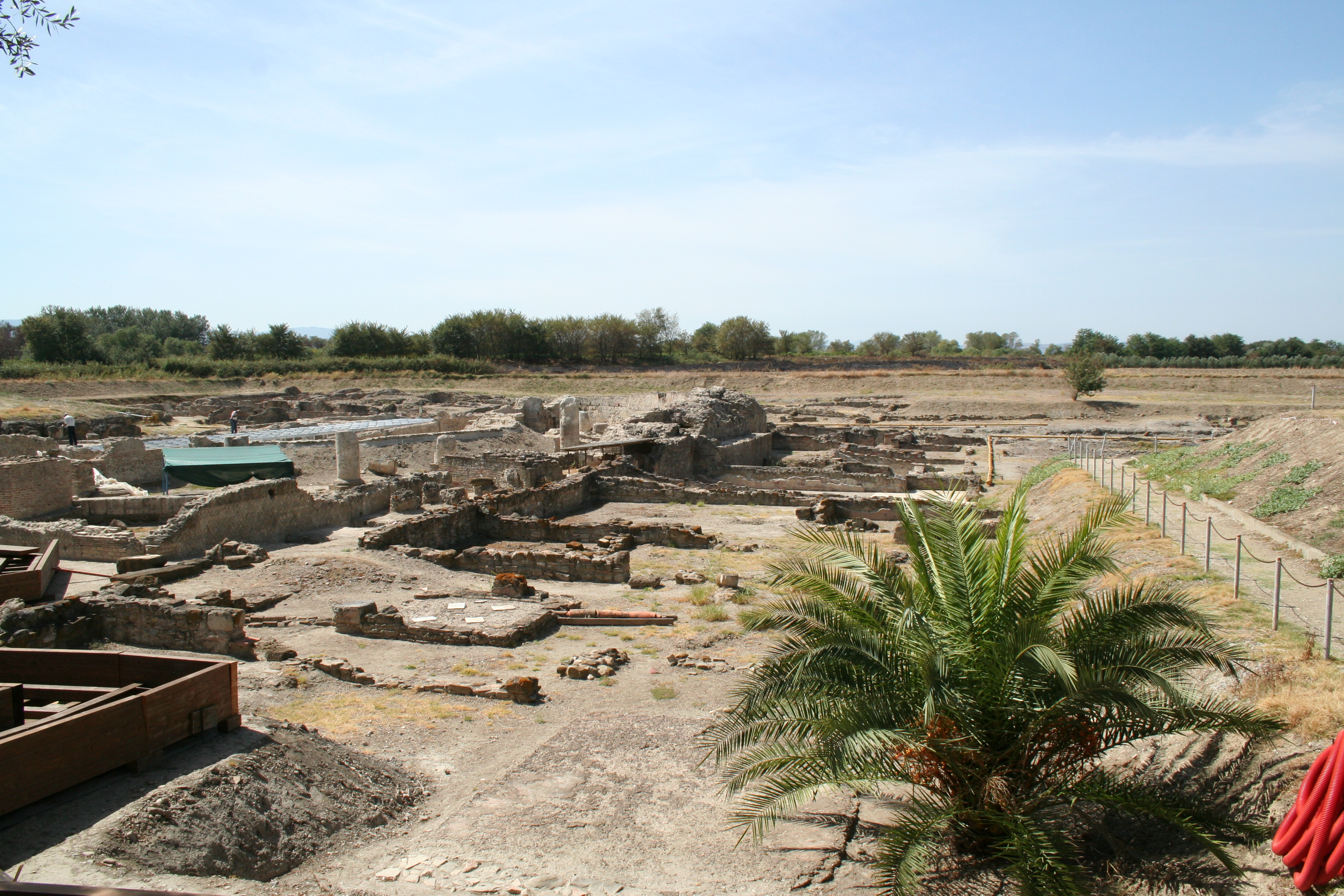
Excavated ruins from the site of Thurii

As a consequence of his high-handed behaviour, when he left office in 290 BC, Megellus was prosecuted by two of the tribunes on the charge of having employed troops on his own land. He was condemned by all thirty-three Roman tribes, and fined 500,000 asses, the heaviest fine issued to a Roman citizen up to that point.

Megellus’ last known activity in public life occurred in 282 BC, when Rome was asked to intercede on behalf of the town of Thurii, which was suffering raids from the Lucanians and Bruttians. When the Romans sailed their ships into the Bay of Tarentum, the Tarentines took this to be a breach of the treaty prohibiting Roman ships from entering. They successfully attacked the ships and followed up with an assault against Thurii, capturing Roman citizens in the process. Rome sent Megellus to Tarentum to demand their release, and for the Tarentines to hand over those who had committed these aggressive acts against Rome. His demands were rejected out of hand, and Megellus was treated without the customary respect accorded an ambassador; the Terentines mocked his Roman toga, his imperfect Greek pronunciation, and as he was led out of the town, he was even apparently urinated upon.

== Sources ==
=== Ancient ===
- Livy, History of Rome
- Dionysius of Halicarnassus, Roman Antiquities

=== Modern ===
- Forsythe, Gary, A Critical History of Early Rome from Prehistory to the First Punic War (2005)
- Oakley, S. P., A Commentary on Livy, Books 6-10 Vol. IV (2007)
- Salmon, E. T., Samnium and the Samnites, (2010)
- Broughton, T. Robert S., The Magistrates of the Roman Republic, Vol I (1951)
- Smith, William, Dictionary of Greek and Roman Biography and Mythology, Vol II (1867).
- Arnold, Thomas, History of Rome (1840)

Political offices
Preceded by Quintus Marcius Tremulus, and Publius Cornelius Arvina	Consul of the Roman Republic; 305 BC with Tiberius Minucius Augurinus	Succeeded by Publius Sempronius Sophus, and Publius Sulpicius Saverrio
Preceded by Quintus Fabius Maximus Rullianus V, and Publius Decius Mus IV	Consul of the Roman Republic; 294 BC with Marcus Atilius Regulus	Succeeded by Lucius Papirius Cursor, and Spurius Carvilius Maximus
Preceded by Quintus Fabius Maximus Gurges, and Decimus Junius Brutus Scaeva	Consul of the Roman Republic; 291 BC with Gaius Junius Bubulcus Brutus	Succeeded by Publius Cornelius Rufinus, and Manius Curius Dentatus
