= Clepsina =

Clepsina is an ancient Roman cognomen. Notable people with this cognomen include:

- Gaius Genucius Clepsina, 3rd century BC Roman politician, brother of Lucius Genucius Clepsina
- Lucius Genucius Clepsina, 3rd century BC Roman politician
