= Aquilonia =

Aquilonia (Latin, "the north", "northern") may refer to:

- Aquilonia, the unknown site of the battle of Aquilonia (293 BC) between the Roman Republic and the Samnites
- Aquilonia, a Roman city around modern Lacedonia, astride Campanian Apennines
- Aquilonia, Campania (called Carbonara till 1861), a modern town in the Province of Avellino, Italy
- Orlec (Italian: Aquilonia), a village on the island of Cres in Croatia
- Quimper (Latin: Civitas Aquilonia), a town in Brittany, France
- Aquilonia (Conan), a fictional kingdom created by Robert E. Howard for the fictional character Conan the Barbarian
