= Quintus Marcius Tremulus =

Quintus Marcius Tremulus was a Roman plebeian magistrate. He was first elected in 306 BC with Publius Cornelius Arvina. In his first consulate Tremulus led wars, which were won with ease, against the Hernici and Anagni. When Tremulus returned to Rome an equestrian statue dedicated to him was erected in front of the Temple of Castor and Pollux.

He was elected consul in 288, again with the same colleague Publius Cornelius Cossus Arvina.

He was likely the father of Quintus Marcius Philippus.

Political offices
Preceded by Appius Claudius Caecus and Lucius Volumnius Flamma Violens	Consul of the Roman Republic; 306 BC with Publius Cornelius Arvina	Succeeded by Lucius Postumius Megellus and Tiberius Minucius Augurinus
