= Tiberius Minucius Augurinus Molliculus =

Roman statesman of the 2nd century BC

Tiberius Minucius Augurinus Molliculus was a statesman of the Augurinus family of the Minucia gens of ancient Rome who lived in the 2nd century BC.

He was praetor peregrinus in 180 BCE, and died of the pestilence which visited Rome in that year.
