= Gaius Minucius Augurinus =

Roman statesman of the 2nd century BC

Gaius Minucius Augurinus was a statesman of the Augurinus family of the Minucia gens of ancient Rome who lived in the 2nd century BC.

He was tribune of the plebs in 187 BCE, and proposed the imposition of a fine upon Lucius Cornelius Scipio Asiaticus, owing to accusation of misappropriating part of the indemnity paid by Antiochus. When Scipio refused, Minucius ordered his arrest, which was blocked by the intervention of Minucius's colleague – and Scipio's enemy – Tiberius Sempronius Gracchus, the historian Livy writes, out of a desire that the aristocracy not be jailed like a common debtor.
