= Lucius Papirius Cursor (consul in 293 and 272 BC) =

Roman politician

Lucius Papirius Cursor was a 3rd century BC Roman politician, elected consul twice. A grandson of Lucius Papirius Cursor, his brother Lucius Papirius Praetextatus became censor in 272 BC.

== Life ==
He and Spurius Carvilius Maximus were elected consuls, together leading victorious campaigns against the Samnites. Papirius went to confront them to force them to lift the siege of Aquilonia. The augur charged with the sacred chickens who was accompanying the consul announced a favourable omen for the battle even though the birds gave no such indication. Papirius was told of this deception but nevertheless engaged the enemy, with the lying augur placed in the front line and killed by the first volley of Samnite spears, thus removing the insult to religion, avenging the affront to the consul and assuring a Roman victory. According to Orosius, 12,000 Samnites were killed and 3,000 captured, but the victory was spoiled when an epidemic broke out and spread to Rome soon afterwards.

After a second indecisive engagement, Papirius had the camp servants mount the animals from the army's baggage train and run noisily down a hill near the battlefield. He lied to his soldiers that this was the other consul's army arriving, about to steal their victory, and thus encouraged his men on to victory. He was honoured with a triumph for that success. The copper and silver spoils exhibited at the triumph were handed over to Rome's public treasury, with Papirius' troops refused even the smallest share in them. The loot was also not used to pay the troops, which instead had to be done by raising tribute, thus increasing discontent. Papirius' avarice was balanced out by his consular colleague's triumph, in which 102 ases were given to each soldier. Papirius used the spoils to build, decorate and dedicate a temple to Quirinus, first vowed by his father during his dictatorship. Pliny the Elder reports with some doubt that Papirius put up Rome's first sundial in the temple.

He and Carvilius were elected both consul a second time in 272 BC. Papirius ended the war against Tarentum by bribing the garrison's leader Milon, who handed over the citadel in return for being able to lead out his troops and to take away the city's treasure. Papirius won a second triumph for this victory over the inhabitants of Taranto, the Bruttians and the Samnites.

Political offices
Preceded by Lucius Postumius Megellus and Marcus Atilius Regulus	Consul of the Roman Republic with Spurius Carvilius Maximus; 293 BC	Succeeded by Quintus Fabius Maximus Gurges and Decimus Junius Brutus
Preceded by Gaius Claudius Canina, Gaius Fabius Dorso Licinus (mort e.), and Gaius Fabricius Luscinus	Consul of the Roman Republic with Spurius Carvilius Maximus; 272 BC	Succeeded by Caeso Quinctius Claudus and Lucius Genucius Clepsina
