= Augurinus =

Ancient Roman cognomen

Augurinus is an ancient Roman cognomen. Notable people with the cognomen include:

- Gnaeus Genucius Augurinus (died 396 BC), Roman consular tribune
- Titus Genucius Augurinus, Roman politician
- Marcus Minucius Augurinus (fl. c. 509 – 488 BC), Roman politician
- Publius Minucius Augurinus (fl. c. 492 BC), Roman politician
- Tiberius Minucius Augurinus (died 305 BC), Roman politician
- Lucius Minucius Esquilinus Augurinus (fl. c. 458 – 439 BC), Roman politician
