= Caramagna Piemonte =

- Comune
- Comune di Caramagna Piemonte
- Coat of arms

- Location within Italy Location within Piedmont
- Coordinates: 44°47′N 7°44′E
- Country: Italy
- Region: Piedmont
- Province: Cuneo (CN)
- Frazioni: Caporali, Gangaglietti, Gabrielassi, Tetti Sotto, Tre Ponti

Government
  - Mayor: Francesco Emanuel (Civic List)

Area
  - Total: 26.33 km^{2} (10.17 sq mi)
- Elevation: 254 m (833 ft)

Population (1-1-2021)
  - Total: 3,056
  - Density: 116.1/km^{2} (300.6/sq mi)
- Demonym: Caramagnese(i)
- Time zone: UTC+1 (CET)
  - Summer (DST): UTC+2 (CEST)
- Postal code: 12030
- Dialing code: 0172
- Website: Official website

Caramagna Piemonte is a comune (municipality) in the Province of Cuneo in the Italian region Piedmont, located about 30 kilometres (19 mi) south of Turin and about 45 kilometres (28 mi) northeast of Cuneo.

Caramagna Piemonte borders the following municipal lands: Carmagnola, Racconigi, and Sommariva del Bosco.

== History ==
The name of Caramagna appears for the first time in 1026. The foundation of the Monastery of Santa Maria by the marquis of Turin Olderico greatly increased the power of the country, which extended its interests around the southern Piedmont and Liguria.

The monastery was entrusted to the care of the nuns of the Order of St. Benedict; the same order was later replaced by the equivalent male order and later by the Girolamiti.

In 1250 Caramagna moved towards an organization of municipal type. In 1544 Caramagna was burned by the Spanish army. In 1690 an army of 15,000 French destroyed the town.

== Main sights ==
- City Hall, the seat of the Municipality of Caramagna Piemonte
- Tower of the Old Council, used for exhibitions and events
- Church of "Assunzione di Maria Vergine" and the nearby Abbey
- Church "Arciconfraternita di Santa Croce"
- The House of the "Beata Caterina"

== Economy ==
The 18% of the population are farmers, cultivating fodder coming from meadows, fields produce mainly corn. These products provide a good meat production and a lot of milk; the factory "Fattorie Osella" works more than 100,000 kg daily producing cheeses.

Other economical activities include engineering, manufacturing and packaging laminated, handicraft and trade.

== Sport ==
The sports hall of Caramagna hosts the home matches of the team CLD Carmagnola, futsal team that play in serie A2.

== Twin towns ==
- Alicia, Argentina
- Aquilonia, Italy
