= Gaius Quinctius Claudus =

Roman politician in the third century BC

Gaius Quinctius Claudus was a Roman politician in the third century BC.

In some lists his name is reported as Kaeso. From the patrician gens Quinctia, he was elected consul in 271, with Lucius Genucius Clepsina as his colleague. Not much is known of his consulship.
