= Publius Sempronius Sophus (consul 268 BC) =

Roman consul in 268 BC

Publius Sempronius Sophus was a Roman politician in the third century BC.

== Family ==
His father, also named Publius Sempronius Sophus, was consul in 304 BC and later censor. He was the first to bear the cognomen Sophus.

== Career ==
Sempronius Sophus served as consul in 268 BC together with Appius Claudius Russus as his colleague. In that year, they waged war against the Picentes, who had begun a rebellion the previous year. While he was preparing to attack the city of Truento, an earthquake struck. Sempronius Sophus interpreted this as a potentially favourable omen and vowed to build a temple to Mother Earth, should the Romans win the battle. The consuls were victorious over the Picentes and the Senate awarded them a triumph as well as minting memorial silver coins.

The Roman Colonies of Arimini and Benevento were founded in this year.

In 252 BC, Sempronius Sophus served as censor with Manius Valerius Maximus. They expelled 16 senators from the senate and punished four hundred knights for neglecting to build fortifications they had been ordered to, by depriving them of the public horse and demoting them to the lowest class of citizen.
