= Marcus Minucius Augurinus (tribune of the plebs 216 BC) =

Roman statesman of the 3rd century BC

Marcus Minucius Augurinus was a statesman of the Minucia gens of ancient Rome who lived in the 3rd century BC. He was tribune of the plebs in 216 BC, and introduced the bill for the creation of the triumviri mensarii, ancient Roman bankers.
