= Caedicia gens =

Ancient Roman family

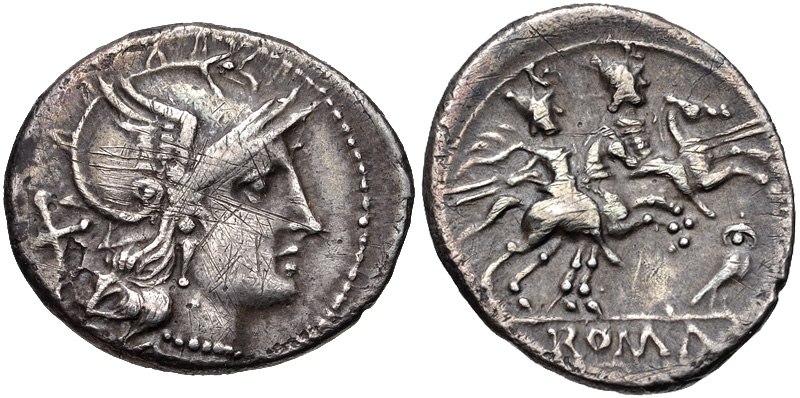
Denarius possibly minted by a Caecidius Noctua between 194 and 190 BC. The owl on the reverse may be an allusion to the moneyer's cognomen.

The gens Caedicia was a plebeian family at ancient Rome. Members of this gens first came to prominence in the early decades of the Republic, but none obtained the consulship until Quintus Caedicius Noctua in 289 BC. The family faded from public life during the later Republic, but one of the Caedicii was known to Juvenal, toward the end of the first century AD.

== Origin ==
The nomen Caedicius belongs to a class of gentilicia derived from cognomina ending in -ex or -icus. Here, the root seems to be a surname, Caedicus, the meaning of which is uncertain.

== Praenomina ==
The Caedicii used the common praenomina Lucius, Gaius, Marcus, and Quintus.

== Branches and cognomina ==
The only cognomen found among the Caedicii of the Republic is Noctua, an owl. Surnames derived from familiar objects and animals were quite common at Rome. Noctia seems to have been a personal cognomen, as it was not borne by later Caedicii. None of the other Caedicii mentioned in history bore any surname. Several numismatists, such as Grueber, nevertheless suggest that this cognomen was a reference to a supernatural warning that Marcus Caedicius witnessed before the Gallic Sack of Rome in 390 BC.

== Members ==
This list includes abbreviated praenomina. For an explanation of this practice, see filiation.

- Lucius Caedicius, tribune of the plebs in 475 BC, charged Spurius Servilius Structus, the consul of the previous year, with mishandling the war against the Veientes, who had occupied the Janiculum. Servilius defended himself ably and was acquitted.
- Marcus Caedicius, a commander of the Roman army after the Gallic sack of Rome, urged the senate to grant Marcus Furius Camillus the command against the Gauls.
- Gaius Caedicius, a legates of the consul Lucius Papirius Cursor in 293 BC. He led the cavalry in an important battle against the Samnites.
- Quintus Caedicius, father of Quintus Caedicius Noctua, the consul of 289 BC.
- Quintus Caedicius Q. f. Noctua, consul in 289 BC. He was censor in 283, but resigned, perhaps due to the death of his colleague, whose name has not been preserved.
- Quintus Caedicius Q. f. Q. n., consul in 256 BC, during the First Punic War. He died in his year of office and was succeeded by Marcus Atilius Regulus, who won an important naval victory.
- Caecidius Noctua, triumvir monetalis between 194 and 190 BC.

== See also ==
- List of Roman gentes

== Bibliography ==
- Dionysius of Halicarnassus, Romaike Archaiologia (Roman Antiquities).
- Titus Livius (Livy), History of Rome.
- Decimus Junius Juvenalis, Satirae (Satires).
- Plutarchus, Lives of the Noble Greeks and Romans.
- Appianus Alexandrinus (Appian), Bella Celtica (The Gallic Wars).
- Joannes Zonaras, Epitome Historiarum (Epitome of History).
- Dictionary of Greek and Roman Biography and Mythology, William Smith, ed., Little, Brown and Company, Boston (1849).
- George Davis Chase, "The Origin of Roman Praenomina", in Harvard Studies in Classical Philology, vol. VIII, pp. 103–184 (1897).
- Herbert Appold Grueber, Coins of the Roman Republic in the British Museum, Vol. I-III, London, Trustees of the British Museum (1910).
- T. Robert S. Broughton, The Magistrates of the Roman Republic, American Philological Association (1952–1986).
- Michael Crawford, Roman Republican Coinage, Cambridge University Press (1974, 2001).
- John C. Traupman, The New College Latin & English Dictionary, Bantam Books, New York (1995).
