= Scandilia gens =

Ancient Roman family

The gens Scandilia, also written Scantilia, was an obscure plebeian family of equestrian rank at ancient Rome. Few members of this gens are mentioned by ancient writers, but a number are known from inscriptions.

== Origin ==
The nomen Scandilius belongs to a large class of gentilicia formed using the suffix -ilius, usually from cognomina with diminutive endings such as -ilus or -ulus. The root of the name appears to be Scantillus, perhaps a diminutive of Scantius, another gentile name, which also seems to have given rise to the nomen Scantinius.

== Praenomina ==
The Scandilii used a variety of common praenomina, including Lucius, Gaius, Marcus, Publius, Quintus, Titus, and Aulus. One of the women of this family bore the Etruscan praenomen Hastia, perhaps the Etruscan equivalent of the old Latin praenomen Hosta.

== Branches and cognomina ==
A number of personal cognomina appear among the Scandilii, some of which were the original names of freedmen who had assumed Roman names when they were manumitted. Of the others, Rufus was a common surname typically given to someone with red hair. Felix referred to someone happy, or fortunate, while Fabatus was derived from faba, a bean, and belonged to a large class of cognomina derived from the names of familiar objects, plants, and animals. Campana belongs to another group of surnames indicating one's place of origin, while Prima was originally a praenomen, given to an eldest daughter.

== Members ==
This list includes abbreviated praenomina. For an explanation of this practice, see filiation.

- Publius Scandilius, an eques who brought suit against Verres and his accomplice, Quintus Apronius, for having defrauded Scandilius during Verres' government of Sicily. Verres manipulated the trial in such a way that not only did Scandilius never recover his property, but he forfeited five thousand sestertii given as surety.
- Lucius Scandilius Sp. f., named in a mid-first century BC inscription from Amiternum in Sabinum, along with Lucius Scandilius Bargates, apparently his freedman.
- Lucius Scandilius L. l. Bargates, a freedman named in a mid-first century BC inscription from Amiternum.
- Scandilius, named in a late first century BC funerary inscription from Rome.
- Marcus Scandilius Hedonus, buried at Rome in the latter half of the first century BC.
- Scandilius Rufus, named in a late first century BC inscription from Rome.
- Gaius Scandilius Philetus, together with his wife, Scandilia Prima, dedicated a first-century monument at Pisae in Etruria to their son, the decurion Gaius Scandilius.
- Scandilia Prima, together with her husband, Gaius Scandilius Philetus, dedicated a first-century monument at Pisae to their son, the decurion Gaius Scandilius.
- Gaius Scandilius, a decurion at Pisae, where he was buried with a monument from his parents, Gaius Scandilius Philetus and Scandilia Prima, dating to the first century.
- Scandilia Musa, buried at Rome, aged sixty, some time in the first century, with a monument from Donatus, a plumber, and slave of the imperial household.

=== Undated Scandilii ===
- Scandilia, the slave of Marcus Cassius Antiochus, a freedman at Rome.
- Aulus Scandilius A. f., the son of Aulus Scandilius and Caesia, named in n inscription from Clusium in Etruria.
- Hastia Scandilia, named in an inscription from Clusium.
- Marcus Scandilius, named in an inscription from Philippi in Macedonia.
- Marcus Scandilius, named in an inscription from Narbo in Gallia Narbonensis.
- Scandilia C. f. Campana, named in an inscription from Hispania Baetica.
- Scandilia M. l. Chreste, a freedwoman named in an inscription from Rome.
- Marcus Scandilius Fabatus, a cavalry prefect, made a libationary offering to Apollo at Submuntorium in Rhaetia.
- Titus Scandilius Felix, buried at Theveste in Africa Proconsularis.
- Scantilius Galus, buried at Castellum Fabatianum in Numidia, aged one hundred and three.
- Scandilia M. l. Maneme, a freedwoman buried at Rome.
- Quintus Scantilius Marcus, a soldier in the first legion, buried at Novae in Moesia Inferior, with a monument from his father, Africanus.
- Scandilia Optata, made a libationary offering at Philippi.
- Scandilia C. l. Pamphila, a freedwoman buried at Dyrrachium in Macedonia.

== See also ==
- List of Roman gentes

== Bibliography ==
- Marcus Tullius Cicero, In Verrem.
- Dictionary of Greek and Roman Biography and Mythology, William Smith, ed., Little, Brown and Company, Boston (1849).
- Theodor Mommsen et alii, Corpus Inscriptionum Latinarum (The Body of Latin Inscriptions, abbreviated CIL), Berlin-Brandenburgische Akademie der Wissenschaften (1853–present).
- René Cagnat et alii, L'Année épigraphique (The Year in Epigraphy, abbreviated AE), Presses Universitaires de France (1888–present).
- George Davis Chase, "The Origin of Roman Praenomina", in Harvard Studies in Classical Philology, vol. VIII, pp. 103–184 (1897).
- Stéphane Gsell, Inscriptions Latines de L'Algérie (Latin Inscriptions from Algeria, abbreviated ILAlg), Edouard Champion, Paris (1922–present).
- Peter Pilhofer, Philippi, Band 2: Katalog der Inschriften von Philippi (Catalog of Inscriptions from Philippi, abbreviated Philippi), Tübingen (2nd Edition, 2009).
- G. L. Gregori, "Polla Valeria e Valeria Polla: Due matronae solo in apparenza omonime. Tra Repubblica e Principato", in Matronae in domo et in re publica agentes, F. Cenerini, F. Rohr Vio, eds., Trieste (2016), pp. 109–120.
