= Aulus Sempronius Atratinus (consul 497 BC) =

5th-century BC Roman politician, consul and general

- Office: Consul (497, 491 BC)

Aulus Sempronius Atratinus was a Roman Republican politician during the beginning of the 5th century BC. He served as Consul of Rome in 497 BC and again in 491 BC. He was of the patrician branch of his gens although the Sempronia gens also included certain plebeian families.

In both of those terms as a Roman consul, he served together with Marcus Minucius Augurinus. Livy cites Sempronius Atratinus as without a cognomen (simply as A. Sempronius), but the consular records show only his cognomen. Dionysius of Halicarnassus refers to him with his full name.

During his first consular appointment in 497 BC, he consecrated the newly built Temple of Saturn in the Roman Forum. The aforementioned writers relate the foundation with the festivals of Saturnalia.

There had been a famine in Rome in the previous year and, in 491 BC during Sempronius' second consulship, a significant quantity of corn was imported from Sicily, and the question of how it should be distributed amongst the Roman citizens, together with tensions arising from the recent secession of the plebs, led to the exile and defection of Gnaeus Marcius Coriolanus after he unsuccessfully advocated the reversal of the reforms which arose from the secession, including the creation of the office of the tribunes.

Dionysius of Halicarnassus further states that Sempronius Atratinus was a prefect of Rome during the Battle of Lake Regillus (498 BC or 496 BC). The same historian writes that Sempronius Atratinus was involved in the wars against the Hernici and the Volsci in 487 BC. He is mentioned as the first Interrex in 483 for the election of the college of 482 BC, Lydus instead names him dictator and still has him holding the election. The first Interrex position is otherwise ascribed to the curio maximus, which might either mean that Dionysius ignored the politically insignificant curio maximus in his listing of the interreges of 482 or that Sempronius was the curio maximus.

Sempronius is included in a broken notice by Festus where he is listed among those who were burned at the Circus Maximus in 486 BC, possibly for conspiring with the consul Spurius Cassius Vecellinus. Considering that Sempronius is mentioned after this event, one can assume that Festus is either incorrect or that the Sempronius listed is a different person than the consul.

Political offices
Preceded by Quintus Cloelius Siculus; Titus Larcius	Roman consul 497 BC with Marcus Minucius Augurinus	Succeeded by Aulus Postumius Albus Regillensis; Titus Verginius Tricostus Caelimontanus
Preceded by Titus Geganius Macerinus; Publius Minucius Augurinus	Roman consul II; 491 BC with Marcus Minucius Augurinus II	Succeeded by Quintus Sulpicius Camerinus Cornutus; Spurius Larcius
