= Scantinia gens =

Ancient Roman family

The gens Scantinia was a minor plebeian family at ancient Rome. Members of this gens are first mentioned in the third century BC, but few of them held positions of importance in the Roman state.

== Origin ==
The nomen Scantinius belongs to a common class of gentilicia formed using the suffix -inius. Such names were typically derived from surnames ending in -inus, but this type was so common that -inius came to be regarded as a regular gentile-forming suffix, and was applied even in cases where there was no morphological justification. There is no evidence of a corresponding cognomen Scantinus, so the name was probably formed directly from Scantius, another gentile name. The similar nomen Scandilius was probably formed in the same manner.

== Branches and cognomina ==
The only cognomen associated with any of the Scantinii mentioned in history is Capitolinus, one of a large class of surnames derived from one's place of origin or residence. It indicated that its bearer or one of his ancestors lived on the Capitoline Hill, one of the Seven Hills of Rome.

== Members ==
This list includes abbreviated praenomina. For an explanation of this practice, see filiation.

- Gaius Scantinius Capitolinus, accused by Marcus Claudius Marcellus of having propositioned his son, when Scantinius and Marcellus were both aediles, about 226 BC. The senate was convinced by the testimony of Marcellus' son, and condemned Scantinius to a fine, which Marcellus used to make three silver libation bowls, which he dedicated to the gods.
- Publius Scantinius, one of the pontifices, died in 216 BC. He and two of his colleagues, who fell at Cannae, were among those officials and magistrates for whom replacements were chosen in the wake of that catastrophe.
- Scantinius, tribune of the plebs in an uncertain year, was the author of the lex Scantinia de Nefanda Venere, a law forbidding certain sexual practices. Cicero's friend, Marcus Caelius Rufus, was accused under this law by Appius Claudius Pulcher, censor in 50 BC, but the charge rebounded against him and came to naught.
- Marcus Scantinius M. f., one of the quindecimviri sacris faciundis named in the Fasti Albenses, a list of magistrates from the time of Caesar to the early years of Tiberius.
- Gaius Scantinius, buried at Rome.

== See also ==
- List of Roman gentes

== Bibliography ==
- Marcus Tullius Cicero, Epistulae ad Familiares.
- Titus Livius (Livy), History of Rome.
- Valerius Maximus, Factorum ac Dictorum Memorabilium (Memorable Facts and Sayings).
- Lucius Mestrius Plutarchus (Plutarch), Lives of the Noble Greeks and Romans.
- Gaius Suetonius Tranquillus, De Vita Caesarum (Lives of the Caesars, or The Twelve Caesars).
- Decimus Junius Juvenalis, Satirae (Satires).
- Quintus Septimius Florens Tertullianus (Tertullian), De Monogamia (Concerning Monogamy).
- Decimius Magnus Ausonius, Epigrammata de Diversis Rebus (Epigrams about Various Things).
- Dictionary of Greek and Roman Biography and Mythology, William Smith, ed., Little, Brown and Company, Boston (1849).
- Theodor Mommsen et alii, Corpus Inscriptionum Latinarum (The Body of Latin Inscriptions, abbreviated CIL), Berlin-Brandenburgische Akademie der Wissenschaften (1853–present).
- René Cagnat et alii, L'Année épigraphique (The Year in Epigraphy, abbreviated AE), Presses Universitaires de France (1888–present).
- George Davis Chase, "The Origin of Roman Praenomina", in Harvard Studies in Classical Philology, vol. VIII, pp. 103–184 (1897).
- T. Robert S. Broughton, The Magistrates of the Roman Republic, American Philological Association (1952–1986).
