= Marcus Atilius Regulus (consul 294 BC) =

Marcus Atilius Regulus was a Roman consul in 294 BC. During his year, according to Livy's main source, he served against the Samnites and Apulians without great success until he vowed a temple to Jupiter Stator. After a victory at Interamna, Livy reports that a triumph was refused; the Acta Triumphorum however report that Regulus triumphed over the Volsones and the Samnites.

This Regulus is possibly related to the later homonymous consul of 267 BC. He was probably the son of the consul of the same name in 335 BC.

Political offices
Preceded by Quintus Fabius Maximus Rullianus V, and Publius Decius Mus IV	Consul of the Roman Republic; 294 BC with Lucius Postumius Megellus II	Succeeded by Lucius Papirius Cursor, and Spurius Carvilius Maximus
