= Spurius Carvilius Maximus =

Roman consul

Spurius Carvilius C. f. C. n., later surnamed Maximus, was the first member of the plebeian gens Carvilia to obtain the consulship, which he held in 293 BC, and again in 272 BC.

== Early career ==
Born of equestrian rank, Carvilius served as curule aedile in 299 BC, and six years later entered upon his first consulship with Lucius Papirius Cursor. They met with great success against the Samnites, with Carvilius taking Amiternum, Cominium, Palumbinum, and Herculaneum. Carvilius was then sent into Etruria, where the Falisci had broken the peace. He took the town of Troilium and five other fortified locations, defeated the Faliscan army, and granted them peace in exchange for a large fine.

Returning to Rome, Carvilius celebrated a triumph, distributed much of the booty he had captured to his soldiers, paid 380,000 pounds of bronze into the treasury, and used the remainder to pay for the erection of a temple to Fors Fortuna. Using bronze armor taken from the Samnites, he had a colossal statue of Jupiter built on the Capitol, which was said to be so tall that it could be seen from the temple on the Alban Mount. According to legend, enough bronze fell from the statue during its polishing, that Carvilius had a statue of himself cast from it and placed at the feet of the colossus.

The following year, Carvilius was appointed Legatus to the consul Decimus Junius Brutus, who had no military experience. The historian Marcus Velleius Paterculus also states that Carvilius held the office of censor, probably in 289 BC.

== Second consulship ==
Carvilius was elected consul a second time in 272 BC, together with his former colleague, Lucius Papirius Cursor, in hopes that they would bring the war with the Samnites to an end before Pyrrhus could return to Italy. Although the details of the war were not recorded, the consuls defeated the Samnites, Lucani, Bruttii, and Tarentines, and celebrated a second triumph.

Carvilius was the father of Spurius Carvilius Maximus Ruga, consul in 234 and 228 BC.

== See also ==
- Carvilia (gens)

== Footnotes ==
Political offices
Preceded by Lucius Postumius Megellus and Marcus Atilius Regulus	Consul of the Roman Republic with Lucius Papirius Cursor; 293 BC	Succeeded by Quintus Fabius Maximus Gurges and Decimus Junius Brutus
Preceded by Gaius Claudius Canina, Gaius Fabius Dorso Licinus (mort e.), and Gaius Fabricius Luscinus	Consul of the Roman Republic with Lucius Papirius Cursor; 272 BC	Succeeded by Caeso Quinctius Claudus and Lucius Genucius Clepsina
