= Appius Claudius Russus =

Roman consul in 268 BC

Appius Claudius Russus (Note: "Rufus" in the Fasti Hydatiani and the Chronicon Paschale; the Dictionary of Greek and Roman Biography and Mythology, which follows these, also considers him the last of the Claudii Crassi.) was Roman consul in 268 BC. He triumphed over the Picentes, but died in office.

== Family ==
Claudius was a member of the patrician gens Claudia. His father was the famed Roman politician Appius Claudius Caecus, who had been twice consul, censor, and dictator. An uncle, Appius Claudius Caudex, was consul in 264, and his brothers included Publius Claudius Pulcher, consul in 249, and Gaius Claudius Centho, consul in 240, and subsequently censor and dictator, like his father.

== Career ==
Claudius held the consulship in 268 BC with Publius Sempronius Sophus as his colleague. They defeated the rebellion of the Picentes, which had started the previous year, and celebrated triumphs. They also founded the colonies of Ariminum and Beneventum. Claudius died before leaving office, although none of the Roman historians mention the circumstances.

Suetonius mentions a Claudius Russus who set up a statue of himself wearing a diadem at Forum Appii, stating that he tried to claim possession of Italy by means of his clientelae. His identification with Appius Claudius Russus, the consul of 268 BC, is not certain, but is consistent with the order in which Suetonius lists the various ancestors of Tiberius. Broughton suggests that Suetonius may have been hinting at something sinister related to Claudius' death in his year of office.

== Bibliography ==
- Titus Livius (Livy), History of Rome.
- Marcus Velleius Paterculus, Roman History.
- Gaius Suetonius Tranquillus, De Vita Caesarum (Lives of the Caesars, or The Twelve Caesars).
- Lucius Annaeus Florus, Epitome de T. Livio Bellorum Omnium Annorum DCC (Epitome of Livy: All the Wars of Seven Hundred Years).
- Eutropius, Breviarium Historiae Romanae (Abridgement of the History of Rome).
- Dictionary of Greek and Roman Biography and Mythology, William Smith, ed., Little, Brown and Company, Boston (1849).
- T. Robert S. Broughton, The Magistrates of the Roman Republic, American Philological Association (1952–1986).

Political offices
Preceded by Quintus Ogulnius Gallus; Gaius Fabius Pictor	Roman consul 268 BC; With: Publius Sempronius Sophus	Succeeded by Marcus Atilius Regulus; Lucius Julius Libo
