= Servius Cornelius Lentulus (consul 303 BC) =

Political and military figure of the Roman Republic

Servius Cornelius Lentulus (c. 340 - after 303 BC) was a political and military figure of the Roman Republic, and a consul of 303 BC

He was a member of the patrician gens Cornelia, of the Lentuli branch. Lucius Cornelius Lentulus Caudinus, the consul of 275 BC, is thought to be his grandson.

He served as consul in 303 BC, with Lucius Genucius Aventinensis as his colleague. During their consulship, an investigation was launched into the Frusinates, who were alleged to have provoked the Hernici to war. The ringleaders of this conspiracy were rounded up and executed.

Later in the year, he successfully campaigned against bandits in the region of Umbria.
