= Titus Geganius Macerinus =

Roman politician, consul in 492 BC

Titus Geganius Macerinus (fl. c. 492 BC) was a Roman politician who served as consul in 492 BC with Publius Minucius Augurinus.

The consuls were required to deal with a famine which had taken hold of Rome and they focused their efforts on obtaining grain shipments from around Italy. The famine arose because the plebeian farmers had not sown their fields during the secession of the plebs which ended the previous year. Envoys were sent by ship to buy grain from the coastal towns of Etruria, the Volsci and others to the south as far as Cumae. Because many of Rome's neighbours bore the Romans animosity from past military conflicts, envoys were even sent as far as Magna Graecia (Sicily). Grain was purchased in Cumae, however the tyrant Aristodemus (who had been made the heir of the exiled Roman kings) seized the Roman ships on account of the property of the Tarquinii which had been seized by the Roman Republic when the king's family had been exiled. Roman attempts to buy grain were also thwarted in the territory of the Volsci, including the Pomptine Marshes. Because of recent wars with Rome, the grain merchants were threatened with violence if grain was sold to the Romans. However, grain was successfully obtained from Etruria and transported to Rome down the Tiber river. An even greater amount of grain was imported the following year from Sicily, and the question of how it should be distributed amongst the Roman citizens led to the exile and defection of Gaius Marcius Coriolanus.

Also in 492 BC, hostilities with the Volsci threatened Rome. However a pestilence spread amongst the Volsci and war was averted. The Romans took steps to protect their position. Additional Roman colonists were sent to the town of Velitrae, and a new Roman colony was established at Norba.

Political offices
Preceded by Postumus Cominius Auruncus; Spurius Cassius Vecellinus	Roman consul 492 BC with Publius Minucius Augurinus	Succeeded by Marcus Minucius Augurinus; Aulus Sempronius Atratinus
