= Lucius Papirius Cursor (censor in 272 BC) =

Roman censor

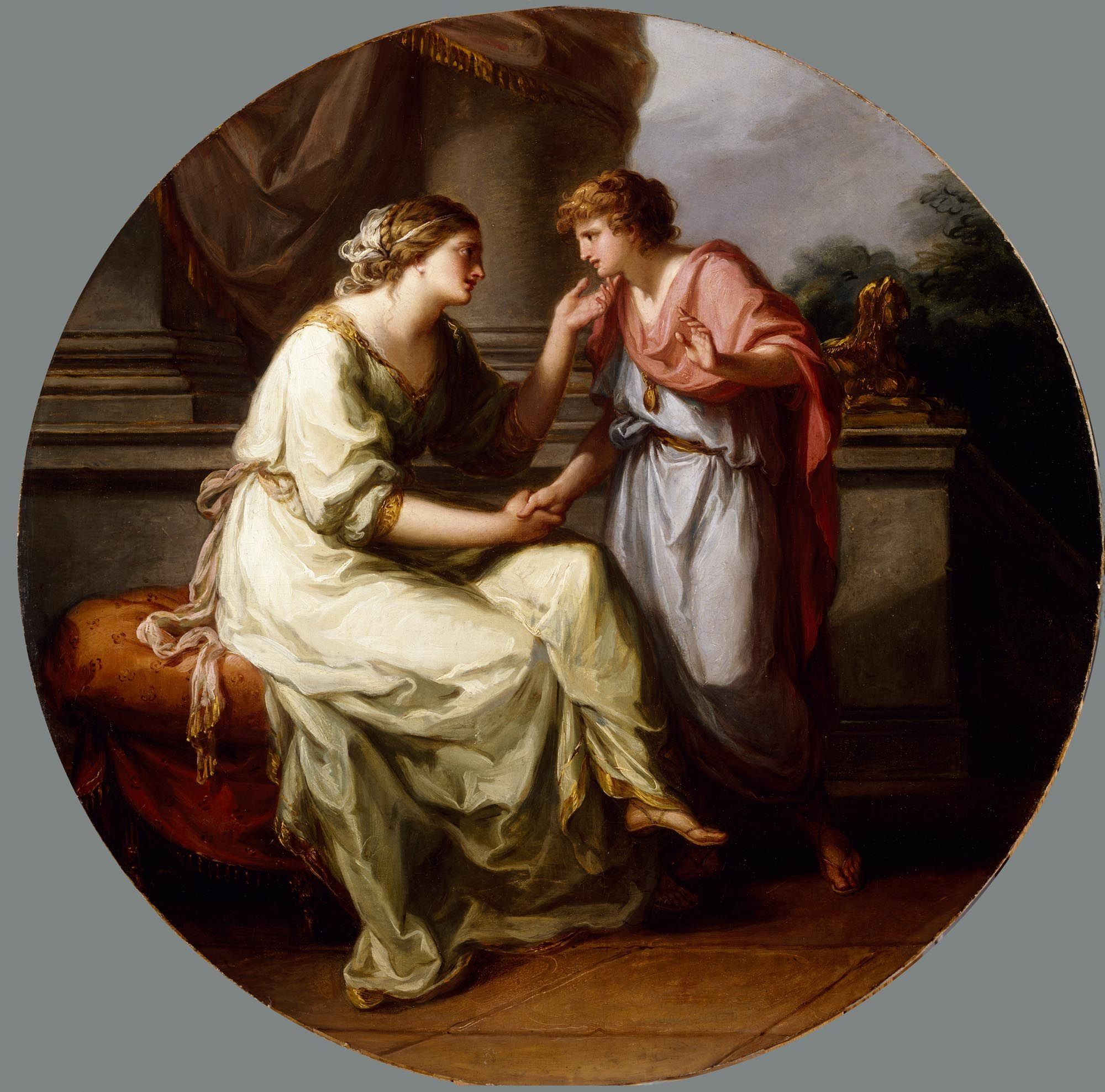
Painting by Angelica Kauffmann depicting Lucius and his mother

Lucius Papirius Cursor or Lucius Papirius Praetextatus (c. 364 BC - 272 BC) was a Roman politician of the 3rd century BC, a grandson of Lucius Papirius Cursor. His brother, also Lucius Papirius Cursor, was twice consul.

He and Manius Curius Dentatus became censors in 272 BC - they ordered the construction of the Aqua Anio, Rome's second aqueduct, funded by the loot from the Battle of Beneventum. It is Frontinus' book on aqueducts which gives him the cognomen Cursor, but he is more often known by that of Praetextatus in the lists of censors. He also appears in a 1775 painting by Angelica Kaufmann.
