= Gaius Fabius Dorsuo Licinus =

Roman politician in the third century BC

Gaius Fabius Dorsuo Licinius was a Roman politician in the third century BC.

He was a member of gens Fabia. Marcus Fabius Dorsuo, consul of 345 BC, seems to be his grandfather. Marcus Fabius Licinius, who was consul in 246 BC, was his son.

Gaius Fabius Dorsuo Licinius himself held the consulship in 273 BC with Gaius Claudius Canina as his colleague.
