= Quintus Fabius Maximus Gurges (consul 292 BC) =

3rd-century BC Roman statesman and general

Quintus Fabius Q. f. M. n. Maximus Gurges, the son of Quintus Fabius Maximus Rullianus, was a Roman consul in 292, 276, and 265 BC. After a dissolute youth and a significant military defeat during his first consulate, he was given the opportunity to salvage his reputation through the influence of his father, and became a successful general, eventually holding the highest honours of the Roman state. He was slain in battle during his third and final consulate.

== Background and early career ==
Gurges' grandfather, Marcus Fabius Ambustus, had been consul three times, interrex twice, and reportedly was princeps senatus, a dignity later filled by his son, grandson, and great-grandson. He had probably been censor, which was generally a prerequisite of those who became princeps senatus, and either he or his son, Marcus was magister equitum in 322 BC.

Gurges' father, Quintus Fabius Maximus Rullianus, was one of Rome's most celebrated generals, and had been consul five times between 322 and 297 BC. In his time he had served as both dictator and magister equitum, and was censor in 304. However, all of his accomplishments followed from a rash incident in his youth, when as magister equitum to the dictator Lucius Papirius Cursor in 325, during the Second Samnite War, he engaged the enemy against the dictator's instructions while Papirius was away attending to other business. Although Rullianus won a significant victory, his commander was furious that his orders had been disobeyed. Fabius only escaped execution by fleeing to Rome, where he begged the intercession of the people, and was saved by the appeal of his aged father.

The younger Fabius received his surname, Gurges, "the whirlpool", due to the gluttonous habits of his youth, in which he consumed every luxury he came across. But when he embarked on a public career, the younger Fabius set aside his indulgent lifestyle and cultivated a more sober image. As curule aedile in 295 BC, Fabius levied fines against wealthy Roman matrons who had been convicted of adultery, and dedicated the funds to building a temple of Venus, which stood near the Circus Maximus.

== Consulships and later career ==
In 292 BC, Fabius was consul for the first time, with Decimus Junius Brutus Scaeva. Rome was engaged in the Third and final Samnite War, and Fabius undertook a command against the Pentri, the leading tribe of the Samnites, in which he was utterly defeated. At Rome, the traditional rivals of the Fabii, the Papirii and the Claudii, urged that Fabius be relieved of his authority and degraded from consular rank as a punishment for his incompetence. In opposition to this, Fabius' father, Rullianus, urged that his son be permitted to redeem himself, volunteering to serve personally as his son's lieutenant on a subsequent campaign. Thus spared public humiliation, Fabius made good on his father's word, defeating the Samnites, taking several towns, and capturing Gaius Pontius, the Samnite general. In recognition of his victories, the senate honoured Fabius with a triumph; (Note: This was probably the triumph that Fabius celebrated on the Kalends of Sextilis (August 1), in the year following his consulship.) the occasion was the more remarkable because the elder Fabius rode beside his son's chariot.

Fabius continued in command against the Samnites as proconsul in 291, and was besieging the town of Cominium, when the consul Lucius Postumius Megellus assumed command of the siege, and ordered Fabius to withdraw from Samnium.

Fabius was consul for the second time in 276 BC, with Gaius Genucius Clepsina. Fabius led an army into southern Italy, where he defeated the Samnites, Lucani, and Bruttii, receiving a second triumph. (Note: This occurred on the Quirinalia, February 17, 275 BC.) Rome suffered a particularly difficult pestilence this year.

In 273, Fabius led a delegation of ambassadors to the court of Ptolemy II Philadelphus of Egypt. He was accompanied by his cousin, Numerius Fabius Pictor, and Quintus Ogulnius Gallus, each of whom would later hold the consulship. On their departure for Rome, Ptolemy presented the ambassadors with rich gifts, which they subsequently deposited in the Roman treasury. However, as a gesture of gratitude and respect, the Roman Senate decreed that the gifts be returned to the ambassadors.

Consul for the third time in 265 BC, with Lucius Mamilius Vitulus, Fabius was sent to aid the elders of Volsinii during a revolt of that city's plebeians against the aristocracy. Fabius was wounded in fierce fighting, and subsequently died. In the same year, his son, Quintus Fabius Maximus Verrucosus, who would go on to become consul five times, and twice dictator, was consecrated an augur. At an uncertain time before his death, Fabius was named princeps senatus, a position of honour that had previously been held by his father and grandfather, and which would later be bestowed upon his son.

== Historical uncertainty ==
Although Quintus Fabius Maximus Gurges has traditionally been identified as the father of Verrucosus, a minority view espoused by Beloch and Degrassi holds that Verrucosus was the grandson of Gurges, consul in 292 and 276, and that his father, also named Quintus Fabius Maximus Gurges, was the consul of 265 BC. Passages in Plutarch and Pliny describe Verrucosus as the great-grandson of Rullianus, although they do not explicitly state that he was the grandson of Gurges, the consul of 292 and 276. In Broughton's opinion, the interval of fifty-nine years between Gurges' first consulship in 292, and Verrucosus' first, in 233, supports this view, although Livy describes Verrucosus as the grandson of Rullianus, and by implication, the son of Gurges. The Dictionary of Greek and Roman Biography and Mythology agrees that Verrucosus was likely the grandson, not the son of Gurges, but supposes that his father might have been the Quintus Fabius who, as curule aedile in 266 BC, insulted the envoys of Apollonia in Epirus, and was given over to that city for punishment, only to be returned unharmed by the people of Apollonia. In this case, the consul of 265 would be the same Gurges who had previously been consul in 292 and 276. This view was suggested by Münzer.

== See also ==
- Fabia gens

== Bibliography ==
- Titus Livius (Livy), History of Rome.
- Dionysius of Halicarnassus, Romaike Archaiologia (Roman Antiquities).
- Valerius Maximus, Factorum ac Dictorum Memorabilium (Memorable Facts and Sayings).
- Gaius Plinius Secundus (Pliny the Elder), Naturalis Historia (Natural History).
- Plutarchus, Lives of the Noble Greeks and Romans.
- Paulus Orosius, Historiarum Adversum Paganos (History Against the Pagans).
- Ambrosius Theodosius Macrobius, Saturnalia.
- Dictionary of Greek and Roman Biography and Mythology, William Smith, ed., Little, Brown and Company, Boston (1849).
- August Pauly, Georg Wissowa, et alii, Realencyclopädie der Classischen Altertumswissenschaft, J. B. Metzler, Stuttgart (1894–1980).
- Karl Julius Beloch, Römische Geschichte bis zum Beginn der punischen Kriege (Roman History to the Beginning of the Punic Wars), De Gruyter, Berlin (1926).
- T. Robert S. Broughton, The Magistrates of the Roman Republic, American Philological Association (1952).
- Edward Togo Salmon, Samnium and the Samnites, Cambridge University Press (1967), ISBN 978-0-521-06185-8.

Political offices
Preceded by Lucius Papirius Cursor and Spurius Carvilius Maximus	Consul of the Roman Republic with Decimus Iunius Brutus Scaeva; 292 BC	Succeeded by Lucius Postumius Megellus and Gaius Iunius Bubulcus Brutus
Preceded by Publius Cornelius Rufinus and Gaius Iunius Bubulcus Brutus	Consul of the Roman Republic with Gaius Genucius Clepsina; 276 BC	Succeeded by Manius Curius Dentatus and Lucius Cornelius Lentulus
