= Decimus Junius Brutus Scaeva (consul 292) =

Decimus Junius Brutus Scaeva was a Roman politician and military man who served as a legate in 293 BC in the army of the consul Spurius Carvilius Maximus and as Roman consul in 292 BC.

== Bibliography ==
- Broughton, T. R. S. (1951). The Magistrates of the Roman Republic: 509 B.C.-100 B.C. American Philological Association.
