= Battle of Bovianum =

305 BC battle between the Romans and the Samnites

- Part of the Samnite Wars
Date	305 BC
Location	Boiano or Pietrabbondante, Italy 41°29′00″N 14°28′00″E
Result	Roman victory

Belligerents
Roman Republic	Samnium

Commanders and leaders
Tiberius Minucius Augurinus, Lucius Postumius Megellus	Statius Gellius
- Location within Italy Battle of Bovianum (Europe)

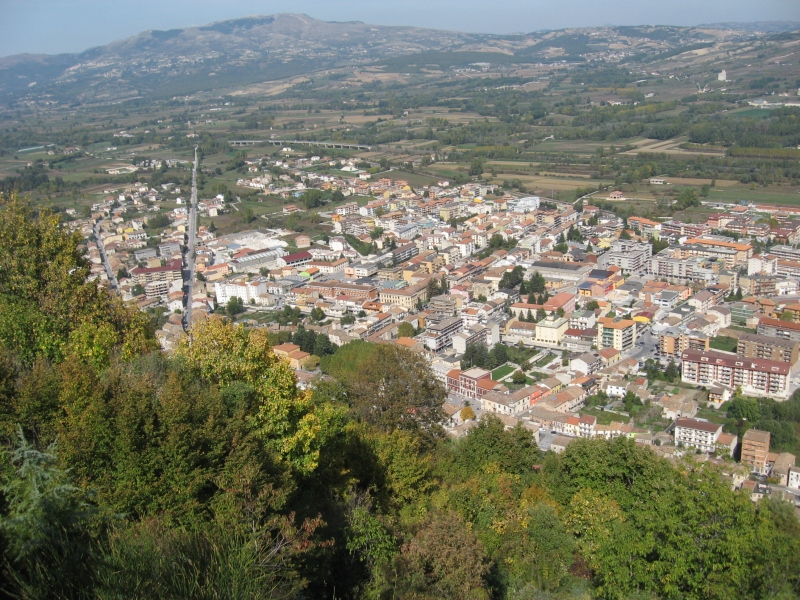
Panorama of Bojano

The Battle of Bovianum was fought in 305 BC between the Romans and the Samnites.

== Battle ==
The Romans were led by two consuls, Tiberius Minucius Augurinus and Lucius Postumius Megellus. The result was a Roman victory and end of the Second Samnite War.

== Aftermath ==
The consul Tiberius Minucius Augurinus died of his wounds during or after the battle.The battle of Bovianum at last completely crushed the spirit of the Samnites, who, unable to continue the war, were obliged to accept the terms dictated by Romans. The Romans won the Battle of Bovianum and the Saints declined after 314 BC the Samnites to sue for peace with progressively less generous terms. By 304 BC the Romans had effectively annexed the greater degree of the Samnite territory, founding several colonies.

== Sources ==
- Livy, Ab urbe condita 9, 44, 5-16
- Diodorus Siculus, Bibliotheca historica 20, 90, 3-4
