= Aquilonia, Campania =

Aquilonia
- Comune
- Comune di Aquilonia
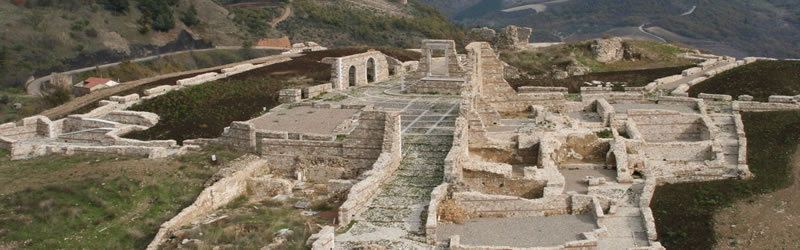
- Archaeological park of Aquicarbo

- Coat of arms

- Aquilonia within the Province of Avellino

- Location of Aquilonia in Italy Aquilonia (Campania)
- Coordinates: 40°59′16″N 15°28′31″E
- Country: Italy
- Region: Campania
- Province: Avellino (AV)

Government
  - Mayor: Giancarlo De Vito

Area
  - Total: 56.15 km^{2} (21.68 sq mi)
- Elevation: 750 m (2,460 ft)

Population (31 December 2017)
  - Total: 1,677
  - Density: 29.87/km^{2} (77.35/sq mi)
- Demonym: Aquiloniesi
- Time zone: UTC+1 (CET)
  - Summer (DST): UTC+2 (CEST)
- Postal code: 83041
- Dialing code: 0827
- Patron saint: St. Vitus
- Saint day: June 15
- Website: Official website

Aquilonia is a town and comune in the province of Avellino, part of the Campania region of southern Italy. It is situated in mountainous terrain in the eastern part of the province, at an elevation of 750 metres (2,460 ft).

== History ==
The Lombards called the town Carbonara or Carunar, supposedly because a major local occupation was charcoal making. In 1861, after the unification of Italy, the town was renamed Aquilonia based on a 16th-century assumption that this was the site of the Battle of Aquilonia between the Rome and the Samnites.

On 23 July 1930 a major earthquake destroyed the town, and it was rebuilt at a higher location nearby.

== Geography ==
Located in the eastern side of the province, close to Basilicata, Aquilonia borders with the municipalities of Bisaccia, Calitri, Lacedonia, Melfi, Monteverde and Rionero in Vulture.

== Twin towns — sister cities ==
Aquilonia is twinned with:

- Cambiano, Italy
- Caramagna Piemonte, Italy
- (United States) Montclair, USA
