= Battle of Aquilonia =

293 BCE battle of the Third Samnite War

- Part of the Samnite Wars
Date	293 BC
Location	Aquilonia (region around Lazio, Molise, Italy)
Result	Roman victory

Belligerents
Roman Republic	Samnites

Commanders and leaders
Lucius Papirius Cursor; Lucius Volumnius; Scipio Barbatus; Spurius Nautius; Caucidius; Trebonius	Unknown

Strength
20,000 men	28,000 men

Casualties and losses
Mostly light	20,340 killed 3,870 captured 97 standards captured

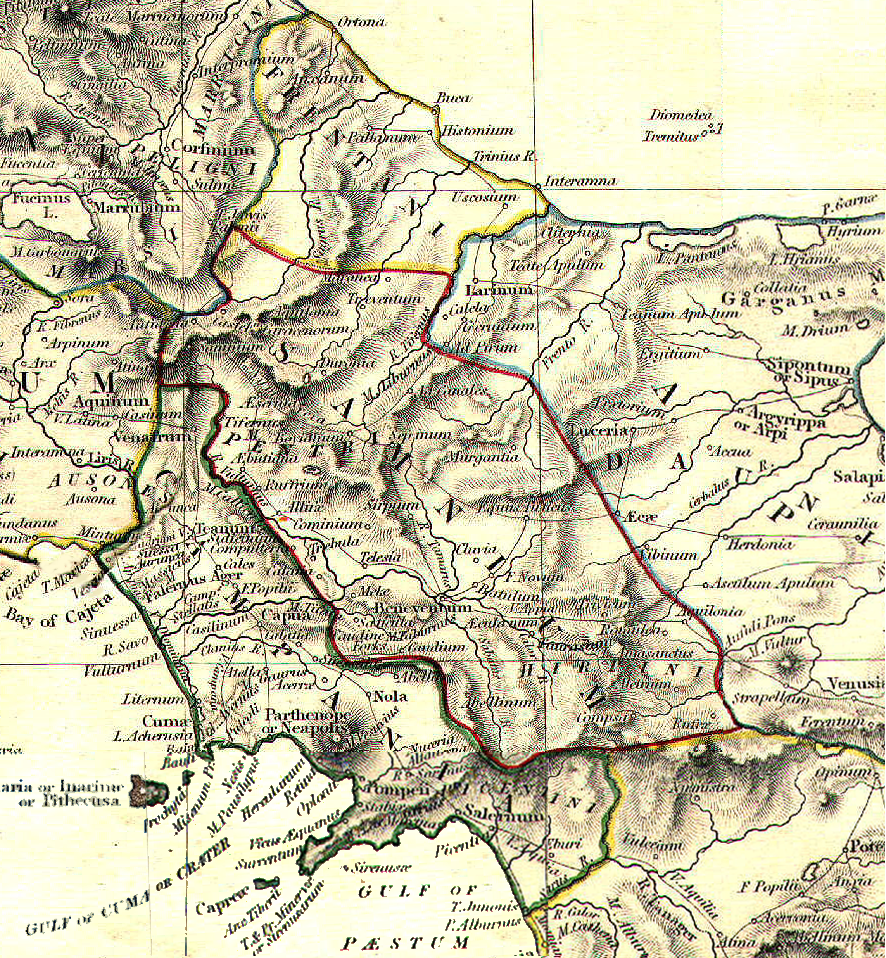
Map of ancient Samnium (from The Historical Atlas by William R. Shepherd, 1911), showing Aquilonia in modern Molise.

The Battle of Aquilonia, was fought between the Roman Republic and the Samnites during the Third Samnite War in 293 BC. This battle saw a large Samnite army that had gathered in the mountainous region of Aquilonia to stop Roman expansion, but was decisively defeated by the Roman legionaries led by consul Lucius Papirius Cursor.

== History ==
According to Titus Livius, the Samnites were desperately short of men, and thus called a general muster to Aquilonia, which all men of Samnium were required to answer. There, they took strict religious oaths to their country, and were then forced to join the army upon an altar to the gods. If they refused, they were slain on the spot and their bodies left in a pile as a reminder to all others what would happen if they refused.

The more experienced men, or those chosen by friends, made up what was called the "Linen Legion", due to their linen tunics which were brightly decorated.

According to Livy a feeder of the sacred chickens (pullarius) in the Roman army falsely reported favorable auspices to the consul, and that this falsification was discovered prior to battle. Papirius responded that the ill omen applied only to the pullarius, and placed him in the front line. When he was struck dead by a javelin before battle began, the consul's interpretation was seen to be fulfilled.

Before the battle the Samnite commander had despatched 20 cohorts (about 8,000 men) to aid the garrison in nearby Cominium which was under attack from Papirus's co-consul Spurius Carvilius Maximus. This left the Samnites with 28,000 men. Despite still being outnumbered (Papirus commanded a standard Roman consular army of about 20,000 men) the Romans offered battle.

Papirius marched out his army and took overall command. He put the experienced commander Lucius Volumnius in command of the right wing of his army, while the equally experienced Scipio Barbatus was put in command of the left wing. One of his tribunes, Spurius Nautius, was sent with three auxiliary cohorts (probably extraordinary - elite troops) and hundreds of camp followers on pack animals on a circuitous route to the Samnite rear.

The Roman and Samnite infantry started the battle. The Romans fought aggressively forcing the Samnites onto the defensive. The Samnites had to bring up their second line to keep the Romans from breaking through. When they were fully engaged a cloud of dust rose up behind the Samnite right, it was Nautius's detachment. While being no more than 1,200 in number they made a much larger dust cloud because of the camp followers on the pack animals who were behind them and were dragging leafy bows across the ground stirring up the dust, creating the effect of a larger army.

The Samnites and the Roman regulars (who had not been informed of the plan) were convinced that the army of Spurius Carvilius Maximus had come to take the Samnites in the flank. The Roman commanders spurred their men on to defeat the enemy before the other army arrived and could share in their glory. Nautius and his cohorts attacked the Samnites in the rear. On the flanks the Roman and allied cavalry, commanded by Caudicius and Trebonius, now charged their opponents, some of the Samnite cavalry broke and routed, fleeing from the battlefield. This allowed the Roman cavalry commanders to send some of their men to attack the flanks of the Samnite infantry. The Samnite infantry held on for some time, but eventually they broke and fled.

The Samnites fled towards their camp and to the city of Aquilonia itself. Volumnius pursued the Samnites to their camp which he captured. Scipio, meanwhile, made his way to Aquilonia, but was unable to take the city. During the night most of the Samnites left and the next day the city was taken. The loot taken from the Samnites was so extravagant, according to Livy, that there was enough gold and silver to decorate all the public buildings of Rome, with some left over to decorate the public buildings of other Roman cities as well.

Papirius Cursor was unanimously decreed a triumph, and a period of seven days thanksgiving was declared in his honor.

== Site of the battle ==
The precise site is unknown, but the probable location would be between modern regions Lazio and Molise. There was also a Roman city called Aquilonia, which is modern Lacedonia in Campania, so it was previously supposed it was the site of the battle. Because of this, in 1861, the neighbouring town of Carbonara was renamed Aquilonia.
