= Marcus Fulvius Curvus Paetinus =

Roman suffect consul in 305 BC

Marcus Fulvius Curvus Paetinus was a Roman suffect consul in 305 BC, serving alongside Lucius Postumius Megellus. He was elected to replace Tiberius Minucius Augurinus, who had died in office.

He was the son of Lucius Fulvius Curvus, consul in 322 BC. He was a member of the plebeian Fulvia gens.

He defeated the Samnites in the Second Samnite War, and celebrated a triumph.
