= Marcus Minucius Augurinus =

Roman politician, consul in 497 BC and 491 BC

Marcus Minucius Augurinus (fl. c. 509 – 488 BC) was a Roman Republican politician of the patrician gens Minucia during the beginning of the 5th century BC. He served as Consul of Rome in 497 BC and 491 BC, both times serving together with Aulus Sempronius Atratinus.

== Family origins ==
Although the Minucia gens has been traditionally known as a plebeian family, the family's origins are indeed of the patrician class and it is from that branch of the family from which Minucius Augurinus is descended.

He was the brother of Publius Minucius Augurinus, who later served as consul in 492 BC.

== Biography ==
Minucius Augurinus was the first of his gens to become a Roman consul, serving in the years 497 BC and 491 BC respectively. On both occasions, his colleague was Aulus Sempronius Atratinus. During his first tenure as consul, he was charged with the consecration of the newly constructed Temple of Saturn in the Roman Forum. It was during this consulship that the festivities surrounding Saturnalia first began. Prior to becoming consul Minucius held the quaestorship in 509 BC.

He was again elected consul for 491 BC. There had been a famine in Rome in the previous year, and in 491 BC a significant quantity of corn was imported from Sicily, and the question of how it should be distributed amongst the Roman citizens, together with tensions arising from the recent secession of the plebs, led to the exile and defection of Gaius Marcius Coriolanus after he unsuccessfully advocated the reversal of the reforms which arose from the secession, including the creation of the Tribune of the Plebs.

He was one of the five ex-consuls sent as envoys to treat with Coriolanus in 488 BC during his march towards Rome.

== See also ==
- Minucia gens

Political offices
Preceded by Quintus Cloelius Siculus; Titus Larcius	Roman consul 497 BC with Aulus Sempronius Atratinus	Succeeded by Aulus Postumius Albus Regillensis; Titus Verginius Tricostus Caeliomontanus
Preceded by Titus Geganius Macerinus; Publius Minucius Augurinus	Roman consul II; 491 BC with Aulus Sempronius Atratinus II	Succeeded by Quintus Sulpicius Camerinus Cornutus; Spurius Larcius
