= Irenaeus (grammarian) =

First-century Greek grammarian

Irenaeus (Ancient Greek: Ειρηναίος, romanized: Eirenaios), also known as Minucius Pacatus, was a grammarian from Alexandria who lived in the first century. He was a student of Heliodorus the Metrician. He taught for some time in Rome and wrote many works, several of which are mentioned in the Suda. Unfortunately, his works have been lost, but from the fragments that are referenced, it appears that Irenaeus was "a zealot of the pure Attic style and a forerunner of Aelius Dionysius and Phrynichus."

== Works ==
The main works of Irenaeus are:

- On the Athenian Procession (Περί της Αθηναίων προπομπίας), a lexicographical treatise about the honors given to the inhabitants of ancient Athens.
- On the Dialect of the Alexandrians (Περί της Αλεξανδρέων διαλέκτου), that it is from Attica or On Hellenism in seven books, a treatise that lexicographically examines the relationship between the common Alexandrian dialect and Attic Greek.
- Books of Attic Names in three volumes (Αττικών ονομάτων βιβλία γ΄), which contain characteristic expressions or rhetorical styles from the leading Attic writers.
- Books on Attic Usage in Speech and Prosody in three volumes.
- Book of Hellenism Rules, one volume (Κανόνες ελληνισμού βιβλίον α΄), an introduction or supplement to the second work, detailing the rules of pure Greek language.
- On Atticism, one volume (Περί Αττικισμού βιβλίον α΄), detailing the rules of the Attic style.
- On the Idioms of the Attic and Doric Dialects (Περί ιδιωμάτων της Αττικής και Δωρίδος διαλέκτου)
