= Minucius Macrinus =

1st century AD Roman and friend of Pliny the Younger

Minucius Macrinus (fl. 1st century AD) was a friend of Pliny the Younger, to whom the latter addressed many of his Epistles, but of whose life we have no particulars, other than that he had a son, Minucius Acilianus, who was also a friend of Pliny's.
