= Minucius Acilianus =

1st-century Roman politician and friend of Pliny the Younger

Minucius Acilianus (fl. late 1st century AD, early 2nd century AD) was born in Brixia, and was the son of Minucius Macrinus, who was enrolled by Vespasian among those of praetorian rank. Like his father, he was also a friend of Pliny the Younger. Acilianus was successively quaestor, tribune, and praetor, and at his death left Pliny part of his property.
