= Publius Sulpicius Saverrio (consul 304 BC) =

Roman consul who defeated the Samnites in 304 BC

Publius Sulpicius Saverrio was a Roman politician of the fourth and third centuries BC.

== Family ==
Saverrio was a member of gens Sulpicia. His father was named Servius, and his grandfather Publius. His son was Publius Sulpicius Saverrio, consul in 279 BC.

== Career ==
In 304 BC, Sulpicius was elected consul together with Publius Sempronius Sophus as his colleague. In this year, the Second Samnite War was settled by a peace treaty. Then the Aequi were defeated in a short time, and Sophus triumphed over them, while Saverrio was celebrating his triumph over the Samnites. Saverrio was elected censor for the year 300, alongside his consular colleague. They established two new tribes: Aniensis and Terentina. Saverrio served as Interrex in 298.

== Bibliography ==
- Fasti Capitolini, AE 1900, 83; 1904, 114; AE 1927, 101; 1940, 59, 60.
- Fasti Triumphales, AE 1889, 70; 1898, 80; 1904, 113, 196; 1930, 60; 1940, 61.
- Titus Livius (Livy), History of Rome.
- Barthold Georg Niebuhr, The History of Rome, Julius Charles Hare and Connop Thirlwall, trans., John Smith, Cambridge (1828).
- Dictionary of Greek and Roman Biography and Mythology, William Smith, ed., Little, Brown and Company, Boston (1849).
- René Cagnat et alii, L'Année épigraphique (The Year in Epigraphy, abbreviated AE), Presses Universitaires de France (1888–present).
- T. Robert S. Broughton, The Magistrates of the Roman Republic, American Philological Association (1952–1986).
