= Publius Sempronius Sophus =

Publius Sempronius Sophus was a Roman politician and general who achieved the honors of being both consul and censor in his political career, as well as renown for being a talented and well respected jurist.

== Family ==
Sempronius was a member of the noble Roman clan of the Sempronii, a gens which had acquired two consulships and four consular tribuneships in the first century of the republic, but had since fallen into obscurity. Sempronius was the first member of the family since 416 BC to acquire a known curule office, but unlike the previous consular Sempronii, who were all patricians, this Sempronius came from a plebeian branch of the gens, as would all consular Sempronii who would follow. His lineage is unknown apart from the fact that his father was also named Publius and his grandfather was named Gaius, but it is known that he had a son, also named Publius Sempronius Sophus, who would himself be consul in 268 BC and Censor in 252 BC.

== Tribune of the Plebs ==
In 310 BC, Sempronius attained his first known political position as Tribune of the plebs, and played a major role in the domestic activities of Rome for that year. Indeed, for in that year the censor Appius Claudius Crassus, later to be known as Caecus, refused to abdicate his position despite his 18-month term being completed and the fact that his colleague had himself resigned in accordance to the law. In response to this, Sempronius used his powers as Tribune of the plebs to commence a motion to have Claudius removed from his office of Censor. After reading out loud the Lex Aemilia, the law that restricted the term of the censor to 18 months, and praising the noble intent of the author of the law, Mamercus Aemilius Mamercinus, Sempronius apparently commenced a long speech which denounced Claudius, comparing him to both his infamous ancestor, the decemvir Appius Claudius Crassus and the hated Tarquinius Superbus. After finishing this speech, Sempronius ordered Claudius to be arrested and stripped of his title, and while six of his colleagues supported this measure, the remaining three defended Claudius and vetoed the orders of Sempronius, and therefore Claudius remained in office.

== Consul and Censor ==
Sempronius is next mentioned in 304 BC when he was elected consul alongside Publius Sulpicius Saverrio. In this year the Samnites, who had been defeated the previous year, sued for peace from the Romans. The senate were not convinced of the sincerity of this request however as the Samnites had previously used said discussions of treaties to buy time, so they sent Sempronius, who was set to campaign against Samnium anyway, to go to Samnium with an army in order to gauge if the Samnites truly wanted to come to a peace. When he arrived he did indeed come to the conclusion that the Samnites truly strived for peace, so he negotiated a peace treaty with them, finally putting an end to the Second Samnite War, which had been raging for 22 years at this point. The rest of the year was not spent in peace however as there was a war soon after with the Aequi. The Aequi were old enemies of Rome who had sided with the Samnites in the prior war, and even after the Samnites surrendered, the Aequians still refused to submit to Rome, causing war to be declared on them by the Romans. Thus, Sempronius alongside his colleague Sulpicius campaigned against the Aequi, who were extremely disorganized and thus easily crushed. After this victory, the consuls ravaged the Aequian lands, taking and destroying up to 31 Aequian cities within 50 days, almost completely wiping the Aequians and their cities from the map. The consuls then returned to Rome and celebrated Triumphs, though the victories for each are disputed. Livy states that both consuls triumphed over the Aequi but the Fasti Triumphales instead states that only Sempronius celebrated a triumph over the Aequians while Sulpicius earned his for an otherwise unrecorded victory over the Samnites.

In 300 BC, Sempronius was himself elected censor, with the other censor being Publius Sulpicius Saverrio, his previous consular partner in 304 BC. In this role, he alongside Sulpicius completed the lustrum the next year and added two more tribes, Aniensis and Terentina, to the Tribal Assembly. In the same year a law was passed which opened the priestly colleges of the Pontifices and Augurs to plebeian membership, with Sempronius being appointed as one of the four new plebeian members of the College of Pontiffs.

== Praetor ==
In 296 BC, in the midst of the Third Samnite War, Sempronius was elected as Praetor, a position which though inferior to that of consul, was frequently held by ex consuls at this time. In this year, there was news received in Rome that the Etruscans, who had allied with the Samnites against Rome, had invited the Umbrians and Gauls to join their cause as well. This struck great panic into the senators of Rome, particularly because of the Roman dread of Gauls which originated during the Sack of Rome nearly a century earlier, and thus they ordered that not only should all free men of fighting age take the military oath, but that regiments should be formed from those above optimal fighting age and freedmen. Since both consuls were away from Rome campaigning against the Etruscans, the Senate gave command of this army to Sempronius in his position as praetor, so that he may guard the city. These fears were alleviated however when the Samnite force invading Campania at the time was crushed by one of the consuls, Lucius Volumnius Flamma Violens, causing the Senate to order a joyous thanksgiving in thanks to the consul. Slightly afterwards, the Senate resolved to establish two colonies around Campania to protect the region, ordering the Plebeian tribunes to pass a plebescite to make Sempronius appoint three men to establish the colonies, which was soon done, though there was a dearth of colonists willing to settle in such a war torn territory. This year was the final one in which Sempronius was mentioned by our sources

== Reputation as a jurist and personal life ==
In his own time as well as in future centuries, Sempronius was greatly renowned for his knowledge and judicial abilities, for which he acquired his cognomen "Sophus", meaning wise. Despite this however, none of legal activity is recorded. Nothing is known of his personal life with the exception being that he may have been the Publius Sempronius Sophus who divorced his wife for her going to the public games against his will, though that may instead have been his son of the same name.
