= Quintus Caedicius Noctua =

Roman consul in 289 BC

Quintus Caedicius Noctua was a Roman politician in the third century BC.

== Family ==
He was a member of the gens Caedicia. His son was Quintus Caedicius, consul in 256 BC.

== Career ==
Caedicius was consul in 289 BC together with Marcus Valerius Maximus Corvinus.

In 283 BC, he served as censor, but retired soon after in unknown circumstances, possibly because of the death of his colleague.
