= Gaius Claudius Canina =

Roman politician

Gaius Claudius Canina was a Roman politician in the third century BC.

== Career ==
Gaius Claudius Canina was consul in 285 BC, with Marcus Aemilius Lepidus as his colleague and in 273 in with Gaius Fabius Dorsuo Licinus. During the first consulship nothing happened that was worth mentioning, but in the second, he was victorious in the war against the Lucani, Samnites, and Brutti.

In this year the colonies of Cosa and Paestum were founded, and a treaty of friendship was signed with Ptolemy II of Egypt.
