= Tiberius Minucius Augurinus =

Tiberius Minucius Augurinus (died 305 BC) was a Roman politician and member of gens Minucia.

== Career ==
In 305 BC, he held the consulship together with Lucius Postumius Megellus. Both consuls waged war against the Samnites in the Second Samnite War. Minucius died from wounds sustained after the victorious battle of Bovianum. Marcus Fulvius Curvus Paetinus succeeded him as consul.
