= Lucius Genucius Clepsina =

Roman politician in the third century BC

Lucius Genucius Clepsina was a Roman politician in the third century BC.

He was a member of gens Genucia. His brother Gaius Genucius Clepsina held the consulship in 276 and 270 BC.

Lucius Genucius Clepsina served as consul in 271 BC with Gaius Quinctius Claudus as his colleague. In that year, he attacked Rhegium, and the city was conquered by his brother in the next year.
