= Gaius Genucius Clepsina =

Ancient Roman politician

Gaius Genucius Clepsina was a Roman politician in the third century BC.

== Family ==
He was a member of gens Genucia. His brother was Lucius Genucius Clepsina, consul in 271 BC.

== Career ==
Genucius held the consulship in 276 BC with Quintus Fabius Maximus Gurges as his colleague. In 270 BC, he was consul again, now with Gnaeus Cornelius Blasio. Rhegium was liberated from the Campanian Legion during his second consulship.
