= Tarquinia gens =

Ancient Roman family

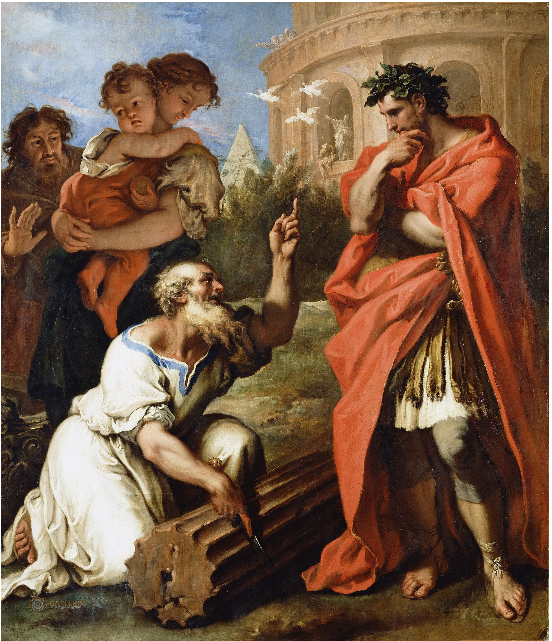
Sebastiano Ricci, Tarquin the Elder consulting Attius Navius (1690).

The gens Tarquinia was a plebeian family at ancient Rome, usually associated with Lucius Tarquinius Priscus and Lucius Tarquinius Superbus, the fifth and seventh Kings of Rome. Most of the Tarquinii who appear in history are connected in some way with this dynasty, but a few appear during the later Republic, and others from inscriptions, some dating as late as the fourth century AD.

== Origin ==
The legendary origin of the Tarquinii who reigned at Rome begins with Demaratus of Corinth, a member of the house of the Bacchiadae at Corinth, which was expelled in 657 BC. Demaratus settled at Tarquinii in Etruria, where he married an Etruscan noblewoman, and had two sons, Lucius and Arruns, who took the surname Tarquinius after the town of their birth. Denied political advancement due to his father's foreign birth, Lucius, encouraged by his wife, Tanaquil, determined to settle at Rome, where he could hope to attain high station based solely on his merits. He fell into the retinue of Ancus Marcius, the fourth Roman king, becoming his trusted advisor. Since the Roman monarchy was elective, rather than strictly hereditary, when Marcius died, Tarquinius successfully argued that he should be named the next king, in preference to the sons of Marcius.

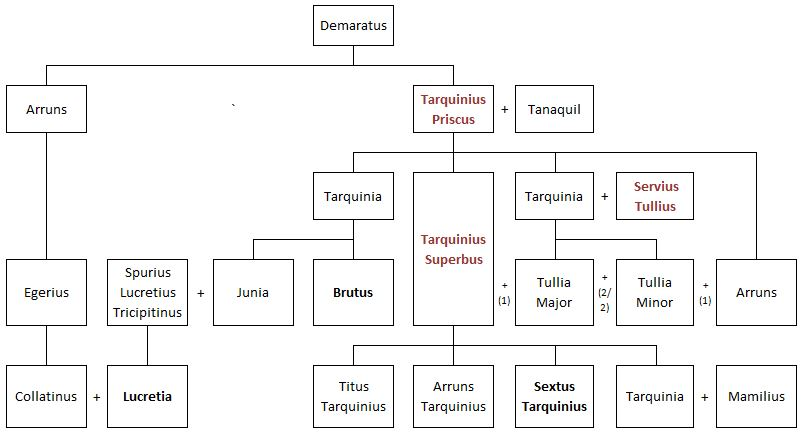
Family tree showing relations to Lucretia and Brutus

Lucius Tarquinius Superbus, the seventh and last Roman king, was said to have been the son or grandson of the elder Tarquin, while Lucius Tarquinius Collatinus, one of the first Roman consuls, was his cousin. Other Tarquinii are mentioned as part of this family, although it is not entirely clear how some of them were related. It is likely that there were additional kings and perhaps other members of the Tarquin dynasty during this period.

It is not clear whether the early Tarquinii should be regarded as patricians or plebeians. The consul Collatinus is generally regarded as a patrician, but as Cornell explains, none of the families that claimed descent from or kinship with the Roman kings were considered patrician in later times, while none of Rome's leading patrician families is represented among the kings. The patricians may have chosen the king, but were probably not eligible for the office, and it is unlikely that the kings themselves were admitted to the patriciate once chosen. It may be that Collatinus was granted patrician status on the overthrow of the Roman monarchy; but as he then accepted exile according to the demand of his colleague, Lucius Junius Brutus, the matter becomes academic, as there was no tradition of patrician Tarquinii at Rome in later times. The Tarquinii of the later Republic were plebeians.

The nomen Tarquinius appears to be the Latin form of the Etruscan Tarchna, apparently the same as the Tarchunies named in one of the frescoes in the famous François Tomb at Vulci. The nomen is certainly derived from the city of Tarquinii, in Etruscan Tarchna or Tarchuna, after its legendary founder, the folk-hero Tarchon, although in historical times the Tarchna family had branches at both Tarquinii and Caere.

== Members ==
This list includes abbreviated praenomina. For an explanation of this practice, see filiation.

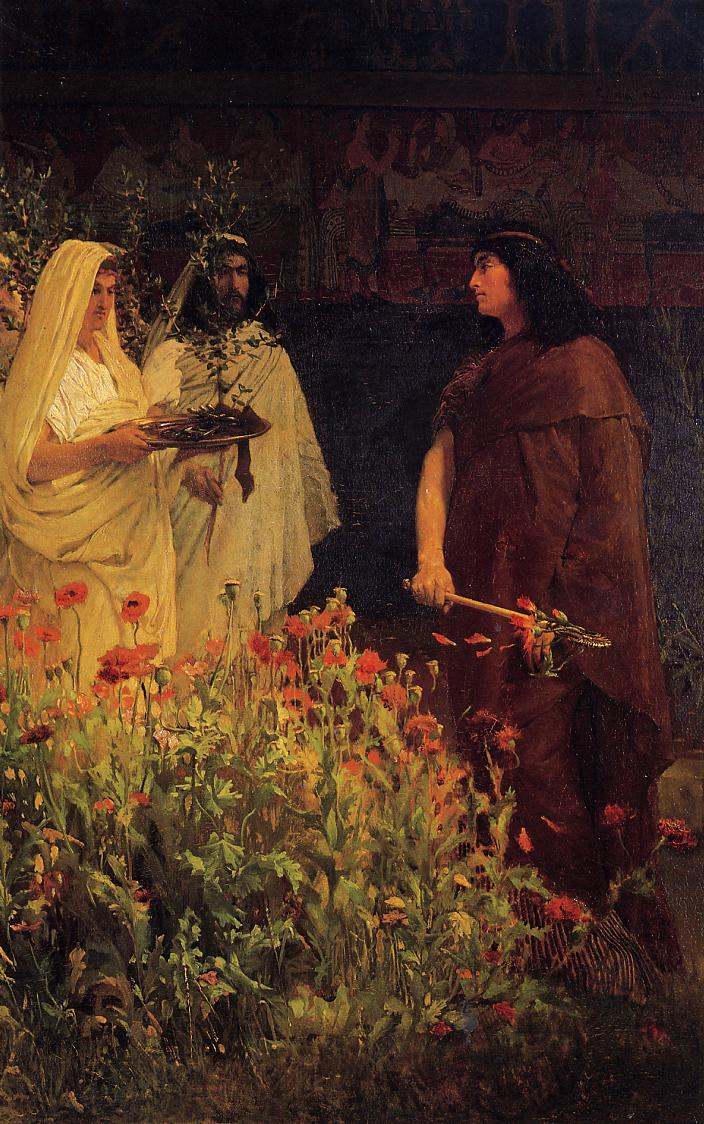
Sir Lawrence Alma-Tadema, Tarquinius Superbus (1867). The king suggests to his son, Sextus, how to bring the city of Gabii under his control, by silently lopping the heads off the tallest poppies in his garden.

- Arruns Tarquinius, the elder son of Demaratus, died shortly before his father, who accordingly left his entire fortune to his younger son, Lucius, unaware that the wife of Arruns was pregnant, and that his first grandson would inherit nothing.
- Lucius Tarquinius Priscus, (Note: Usually said to have been named Lucumo prior to coming to Rome; but Lucumo is thought to be a misunderstanding of the Etruscan title lauchme, a chief or king, a parallel to how the Etruscans apparently took the Latin title magister for a personal name, Macstarna. Moreover, the Etruscans were familiar with the Latin praenomen Lucius, which they borrowed, along with many others, so it may be that the Etruscan name of Lucius Tarquinius was simply Lucie Tarchunies. Some scholars have attempted to identify him with the Cneve Tarchunies, or Gnaeus Tarquinius depicted in the François Tomb, but without any positive evidence that they were the same person.) or Tarquin the Elder, the fifth Roman king, according to tradition conquered a number of Latin and Sabine towns, built the Cloaca Maxima and drained the Roman Forum, laid out the Circus Maximus, doubled the size of the senate, and the number of the equites, the Roman cavalry, and instituted the Ludi Romani.
- Arruns Tarquinius Ar. f. Collatinus, the first grandson of Demaratus, was deprived of his inheritance when his grandfather died shortly after his elder son, unaware that his daughter-in-law was pregnant. According to tradition, young Arruns became known as Egerius, the needy one. (Note: There is some doubt about the true meaning of Egerius, as there was a nymph Egeria, said to have been the counselor of Numa Pompilius the second King of Rome; her name is given different meanings. There is also some reason to believe that Egerius may have been an old praenomen.) However, when he was grown, and his uncle had become King of Rome, he received the command of the Roman garrison at Collatia, thereby obtaining the surname Collatinus.
- Tarquinia L. f., daughter of the elder Tarquin, married Servius Tullius, and was the mother of the two Tulliae.
- Lucius Tarquinius L. f. Superbus, the seventh and last king of Rome, was the son, or more likely grandson, of the elder Tarquin. (Note: Livy notes the uncertainty, but states that the weight of authority makes the younger Tarquin a son of Tarquinius Priscus; Dionysius, basing his opinion on that of the earlier historian Piso rejects this tradition on chronological grounds, as do many modern scholars, noting that according to the traditional dates, the elder Tarquin became king in 616 BC, and died in 578; the younger Tarquin seized the throne in 534, and died in exile in 495. While this does not make it absolutely impossible for them to have been father and son, it seems highly improbable. Dionysius notes that Tanaquil, also an adult before 616, was still alive when Priscus died, thirty-eight years later, when she must have been well over fifty, while Superbus was strong enough to fight in the Battle of Lake Regillus, circa 498 BC.) He overthrew his predecessor, Servius Tullius, and behaved as a tyrant, but he also established Roman hegemony over the Latin League, and the Hernici; made war on the Volsci, founded colonies at Signia and Circeii, and conquered Gabii. He built the Temple of Jupiter Optimus Maximus on the Capitol, but was overthrown by members of his own family and the Roman aristocracy in 509 BC.
- Arruns L. f. Tarquinius, the brother of Tarquin the Proud, married Tullia, the younger daughter of Servius Tullius. His wife was ambitious, while he was not; his equally ambitious brother had married Tullia's demure elder sister. Lucius and Tullia murdered their spouses, and married one another.
- Lucius Tarquinius Ar. f. Ar. n. Collatinus, one of the commanders in the army of his cousin, Tarquin the Proud. He boasted of the fidelity of his wife, Lucretia, which excited the passions of the king's son, Sextus. Sextus' rape of Lucretia set in motion the events that led to the overthrow of the Roman monarchy, but Lucretia took her own life out of shame. Collatinus was elected one of the first consuls, but was called upon to resign and enter into exile by his cousin and colleague, Lucius Junius Brutus, so that none of the hated Tarquins would rule at Rome, and to this demand he reluctantly consented.
- Tarquinia L. f., the sister of Tarquin the Proud, married Marcus Junius Brutus, and was the mother of Marcus, whom the king put to death, perceiving in him a potential threat, and Lucius, who survived by feigning stupidity, later becoming one of the first consuls.
- Titus Tarquinius L. f. L. n., the eldest son of Tarquin the Proud, led the Roman exiles at the Battle of Lake Regillus, circa 498 BC. Although wounded in the fighting, he survived, the last of Tarquin's sons.
- Arruns Tarquinius L. f. L. n., the second son of Tarquin the Proud, led the Etruscan cavalry at the Battle of Silva Arsia in 509 BC, where he and his cousin, the consul Brutus, mortally wounded one another.
- Sextus Tarquinius L. f. L. n., the youngest son of Tarquin the Proud, whose rape of Lucretia led to the downfall of the Roman monarchy. He took refuge at Gabii, which his father had conquered after Sextus had put its leading men to death, but was soon assassinated.
- Publius Tarquinius, a native of Laurentum, together with his brother, Marcus, were among the leaders of a conspiracy in 500 BC to seize a number of defensible positions at Rome, and open the city gates to the king and his allies. Tormented by visions in their sleep, the two brothers revealed the plot to the consul Servius Sulpicius Camerinus Cornutus, and were rewarded when the other conspirators were apprehended. It is unknown how they were related to the king.
- Marcus Tarquinius, the brother of Publius, together with whom he revealed a plot to restore the Tarquins in 500 BC.
- Tarquinia, one of the Vestal Virgins, said to have dedicated a field adjacent to the Campus Martius to Mars, at some time following the expulsion of the kings. The freshly reaped wheat was thrown into the Tiber, where it came to anchor a new island, the Insula Tiberina, sacred in later times.
- Publius Tarquinius, tribune of the plebs in 91 BC, supported the laws proposed by his colleague, Marcus Livius Drusus, whose reforms might have averted the Social War.
- Lucius Tarquinius, a participant in the conspiracy of Catiline, who attempted to implicate Marcus Licinius Crassus.
- Tarquinia, buried at Castellum Elefantum in Numidia, aged thirty-five.
- Appia Tarquinia C. f., named in an inscription from Tarracina in Latium, dating to the first half of the first century AD.
- Tarquinius L. f., named in an inscription from Tarracina.
- Gnaeus Tarquinius, named in an inscription from Hispania Baetica.
- Lucius Tarquinus L. l. Amianthus, a freedman, and the husband of Tarquinia Paederos, built a tomb at Rome for himself and his wife.
- Quintus Tarquinius Apuleius, named in a list of the vigiles at Rome, dating to the beginning of the third century AD.
- Tarquinia Fastina, wife of Marcus Calventius Sabinianus, who built a tomb for her at Burdigala in Gallia Aquitania.
- Tarquinia Ɔ. l. Fausta, a freedwoman named in a libationary inscription from Verona in Venetia and Histria.
- Tarquinia P. f. Ingenua, buried at Cirta in Numidia, aged sixty-five.
- Lucius Tarquinius Januarius, named in a devotional inscription from Beneventum in Samnium.
- Tarquinia Modesta, daughter of Modestus and Lasciva, and the young wife of Lucentius, buried at Beneventum, aged fifteen years, six months, and six days, having been married for six months and seven days.
- Tarquinia L. l. Paederos, wife of Lucius Tarquinius Amianthus, with whom she is buried at Rome.
- Publius Tarquinius Philodespotus, buried at Cirta, aged twenty-five.
- Gaius Tarquinius C. f. Pollio, buried at Cupra Maritima in Picenum.
- Lucius Tarquinius Primus, a murmillo buried at Avaricum in Gallia Aquitania.
- Tarquinius Q. f. Priscus, named in an inscription from Tarracina.
- Lucius Tarquinius Salutaris, buried with his brother, Publius Vibuleius Primus, at Casilinum in Campania, aged fifteen years, one month, and six days, with a tomb from their parents.
- Tarquinia Secunda, the wife of Quintus Pompeius Crispus, and mother of Marcus Pompeius Victor, who became quaestor, and built a tomb for his parents at Bagacum in Gallia Belgica.
- Gaius Tarquinius M. f. Stra[bo?], named in an inscription from Caere in Etruria.
- Tarquinia Tertulla, buried at Castellum Elefantum, aged eighty-two.
- Tarquinia Titosu, buried at Castellum Elefantum, aged forty.
- Tarquinius Valens, one of the heirs of Lucius Cattius Viator, a veteran soldier for whom Valens built a tomb at Misenum in Campania.
- Tarquinius Vitalio, an eques named in a late imperial inscription from Abella in Campania.

== See also ==
- List of Roman gentes

== Bibliography ==
- Marcus Tullius Cicero, De Officiis, De Republica.
- Gaius Sallustius Crispus (Sallust), Bellum Catilinae (The Conspiracy of Catiline).
- Titus Livius (Livy), History of Rome.
- Dionysius of Halicarnassus, Romaike Archaiologia (Roman Antiquities).
- Plutarchus, Lives of the Noble Greeks and Romans.
- Lucius Cassius Dio Cocceianus (Cassius Dio), Roman History.
- Julius Obsequens, Liber de Prodigiis (The Book of Prodigies).
- Dictionary of Greek and Roman Biography and Mythology, William Smith, ed., Little, Brown and Company, Boston (1849).
- Theodor Mommsen et alii, Corpus Inscriptionum Latinarum (The Body of Latin Inscriptions, abbreviated CIL), Berlin-Brandenburgische Akademie der Wissenschaften (1853–present).
- René Cagnat et alii, L'Année épigraphique (The Year in Epigraphy, abbreviated AE), Presses Universitaires de France (1888–present).
- Stéphane Gsell, Inscriptions Latines de L'Algérie (Latin Inscriptions from Algeria, abbreviated ILAlg), Edouard Champion, Paris (1922–present).
- Michael Grant, Roman Myths, Dorset Press (1971), History of Rome, Scribner's (1978).
- Timothy J. Cornell, The Beginnings of Rome: Italy and Rome from the Bronze Age to the Punic Wars (c. 1000–264 BC), Routledge, London (1995).
