= Demaratus of Corinth =

Greek noble and father of the fifth king of Rome

Demaratus (Greek: Δημάρατος), frequently called Demaratus of Corinth, was the father of Lucius Tarquinius Priscus, the fifth King of Rome, the grandfather or great-grandfather of Lucius Tarquinius Superbus, the seventh and last Roman king, and an ancestor of Lucius Junius Brutus and Lucius Tarquinius Collatinus, the first consuls of the Roman Republic.

== Life ==
Demaratus was a Dorian nobleman and a member of the Corinthian house of the Bacchiadae. Facing charges of sedition, in 655 BC he fled to Italy, according to tradition settling in the Etruscan city of Tarquinii, where he married an Etruscan noblewoman. They had two sons, Lucius and Arruns.

According to tradition, Demaratus introduced Greek culture to mainland Italy, and brought potters from Corinth; Greek potters worked at Tarquinii and its port, Gravisca. Pliny the Elder and Tacitus reported that Demaratus brought literacy to the Etruscans. Strabo reported that he became the ruler of Tarquinii, but this is not stated by other sources, and seems improbable given that his son, Lucius, as the son of a foreigner, had to migrate to Rome to obtain political power. According to Pausanias, Demaratus' son or grandson was the first foreigner to visit Olympia, and make a dedication there.

== Descendants ==
Through his sons, Demaratus was the ancestor of the Roman gens Tarquinia, and a forebear of several other notable Roman families. By blood or marriage, his descendants included the last three kings of Rome, as well as the first two Roman consuls.

Demaratus had two sons, Lucius and Arruns Tarquinius. Arruns died shortly before his father, who accordingly bequeathed all of his wealth to his remaining son, Lucius, unaware that Arruns' wife was pregnant with Demaratus' grandson. Thus, in spite of his grandfather's wealth, the child, who was named Arruns after his father, was born into poverty. For this reason, he came to be called Egerius, meaning "the needy one."

Like his father, Lucius Tarquinius married an Etruscan noblewoman, but as the son of a foreigner he was unable to attain high station at Tarquinii. At the urging of his wife, Tanaquil, Tarquin migrated to Rome, where even a foreigner might hope to gain rank and influence. There he won the favour of the king, Ancus Marcius, and when the king died, Tarquin was chosen to succeed him. After subduing the Latin town of Collatia, the king placed his nephew, Arruns, in charge of the Roman garrison there.

Tarquin's daughter married Servius Tullius, who succeeded him as the sixth king of Rome. After a long and prosperous reign, Tullius was deposed by his own son-in-law, Lucius Tarquinius Superbus, the son or grandson of the elder Tarquin. An Etruscan legend told of how Servius, aided by the heroes Aulus and Caelius Vibenna, had defeated and killed a group of enemies, including a certain Gnaeus Tarquinius of Rome, perhaps the son of Tarquin the Elder and father of Tarquin the Proud.

Many of the leading figures on both sides in the establishment of the Roman Republic were descendants of Demaratus. In addition to the king, the king's wife was also a descendant of Demaratus, as her mother is said to have been the daughter of the elder Tarquin; and their three sons played prominent roles in the unfolding of events. It was the rape of Lucretia by Sextus Tarquinius that inspired the Roman nobles to rebel against the king; Arruns Tarquinius and the Roman consul Lucius Junius Brutus slew one another in the first great battle of the Roman Republic; and Titus Tarquinius was wounded, and perhaps perished at the Battle of Lake Regillus. The Latin army that marched against the Romans on that occasion was commanded by Octavius Mamilius, the dictator of Tusculum, and a son-in-law of Tarquin's.

Meanwhile, the first two consuls were each descendants of Demaratus; Brutus' mother was the king's sister, while his colleague was Lucius Tarquinius Collatinus, the son of Egerius, and husband of Lucretia. Before his death at the hands of Arruns Tarquinius, Brutus compelled his colleague to resign and go into exile, arguing that none of the Tarquinian gens should hold power at Rome.

Three important Roman gentes claimed descent from Demaratus; the Junii, through the first consul; the Mamilii, who came to Rome from Tusculum in the fifth century BC; and the Tullii, through Servius Tullius.

== Sources ==
=== Primary sources ===
- Marcus Tullius Cicero, De Republica.
- Dionysius of Halicarnassus, Romaike Archaiologia (Roman Antiquities).
- Titus Livius (Livy), History of Rome.
- Pausanias, Description of Greece.
- Gaius Plinius Secundus (Pliny the Elder), Historia Naturalis (Natural History).
- Publius Cornelius Tacitus, Annales.

=== Secondary sources ===
- Ampolo, Carmine (1976–1977). "Demarato: Osservazioni sulla mobilità sociale arcaica". Dialoghi di Archeologia (in Italian). 9–10 (1–2): 333–345.
- Blakeway, Alan (1935). "'Demaratus': A Study in Some Aspects of the Earliest Hellenisation of Latium and Etruria". Journal of Roman Studies. 25 (2): 129–149. doi:10.2307/296595. JSTOR 296595. S2CID 161972520.
- Brendel, Otto J. (1995). Etruscan Art. New Haven & London: Yale University Press/Pelican History of Art. ISBN 0-300-06446-2.
- Morkot, Robert (1996). The Penguin Historical Atlas of Ancient Greece. London: Penguin. ISBN 0140513353.
- Ridgway, David & Ridgway, Francesca R. (1994). "Demaratus and the Archaeologists". In Richard Daniel De Puma & Jocelyn Penny Small (eds.). Murlo and the Etruscans: art and society in ancient Etruria. Madison: The University of Wisconsin Press. pp. 6–15. ISBN 9780299139100.
- Scullard, Howard H. (1980). A history of the Roman world, 753-146 B.C. (4th ed.). London: Methuen.
- Smith, William, ed. (1849). "Tarquinius". Dictionary of Greek and Roman Biography and Mythology. Vol. III. Boston: Little, Brown and Company. pp. 976 ff.
- Williams, Charles K. & Kontoleon, N. M. (1978). "Demaratus and Early Corinthian Roofs". STELE. Athens. pp. 345–350.
- Winter, Nancy A. (2002). "Commerce in Exile: Terracotta Roofing in Etruria, Corfu and Sicily, a Bacchiad Family Enterprise". Etruscan Studies. 9 (1): 227–236. doi:10.1515/etst.2002.9.1.227. S2CID 54492721.
