= 509 BC =

509 BC in various calendars
- Gregorian calendar: 509 BC; DIX BC
- Ab urbe condita: 245
- Ancient Egypt era: XXVII dynasty, 17
- Pharaoh: Darius I of Persia, 13
- Ancient Greek Olympiad (summer): 67th Olympiad, year 4
- Assyrian calendar: 4242
- Balinese saka calendar: N/A
- Bengali calendar: −1102 – −1101
- Berber calendar: 442
- Buddhist calendar: 36
- Burmese calendar: −1146
- Byzantine calendar: 5000–5001
- Chinese calendar: 辛卯年 (Metal Rabbit); 2189 or 1982 — to — 壬辰年 (Water Dragon); 2190 or 1983
- Coptic calendar: −792 – −791
- Discordian calendar: 658
- Ethiopian calendar: −516 – −515
- Hebrew calendar: 3252–3253
- Hindu calendars
- Vikram Samvat: −452 – −451
- Shaka Samvat: N/A
- Kali Yuga: 2592–2593
- Holocene calendar: 9492
- Iranian calendar: 1130 BP – 1129 BP
- Islamic calendar: 1165 BH – 1164 BH
- Javanese calendar: N/A
- Julian calendar: N/A
- Korean calendar: 1825
- Minguo calendar: 2420 before ROC 民前2420年
- Nanakshahi calendar: −1976
- Thai solar calendar: 34–35
- Tibetan calendar: ལྕགས་མོ་ཡོས་ལོ་ (female Iron-Hare) −382 or −763 or −1535 — to — ཆུ་ཕོ་འབྲུག་ལོ་ (male Water-Dragon) −381 or −762 or −1534

The year 509 BC was a year of the pre-Julian Roman calendar. In the Roman Republic it was known as the Year of the Consulship of Brutus and Collatinus (or, less frequently, year 245 Ab urbe condita). The denomination 509 BC for this year has been used since the early medieval period, when the Anno Domini calendar era became the prevalent method in Europe for naming years.

== Events ==
=== By place ===
==== Roman Republic ====
According to the traditional account:

- The Roman monarchy is overthrown, and the Republican period begins (traditional date).
- The first pair of Roman consuls are elected.
- The Tarquinian conspiracy is formed yet discovered, and the conspirators are executed.
- Forces of Veii and Tarquinii, led by the deposed king Lucius Tarquinius Superbus, are defeated in the Battle of Silva Arsia by the Roman army. Consul Publius Valerius Publicola celebrates the first republican triumph on March 1.
- September 13—The Temple of Jupiter Optimus Maximus on Rome's Capitoline Hill is dedicated on the ides of September.
- Carthage signs a treaty with Rome, delineating their respective spheres.

== Deaths ==
- Lucius Junius Brutus, Roman consul and founder of the Roman Republic (traditional date)
- Titus Junius Brutus and Tiberius Junius Brutus, brothers (and sons of the consul Lucius Junius Brutus) together with their two uncles the Vitellii and three brothers Aquillii, all executed following the discovery of the Tarquinian conspiracy
- Aruns, son of the last Roman king Lucius Tarquinius Superbus
- Spurius Lucretius Tricipitinus, Roman consul suffectus
