= Arruns =

Arruns, also spelled Aruns, is an Etruscan praenomen, thought to mean "prince." Various figures in Roman legend and history were known by this name, including:

- Aruns, an ally of Troy in Roman legend who killed Turnus' ally Camilla, and was killed by the goddess Diana's companion Opis, sent by Diana to avenge Camilla and retrieve her corpse;
- Arruns Porsena, son of Lars Porsena, the legendary king of Clusium;
- Arruns Tarquinius (son of Demaratus), the grandfather of Lucius Tarquinius Collatinus, one of the first Roman consuls in 509 BC;
- Arruns Tarquinius (Egerius), the father of Lucius Tarquinius Collatinus;
- Arruns Tarquinius (brother of Tarquin the Proud), murdered by his wife, Tullia, who subsequently married his brother, Lucius, the seventh and last King of Rome;
- Arruns Tarquinius (son of Tarquin the Proud), slain in battle with Lucius Junius Brutus, colleague of Tarquinius Collatinus.
