= Arruns Tarquinius =

Arruns Tarquinius may refer to:

- Arruns Tarquinius (son of Tarquin the Proud)
- Arruns Tarquinius (son of Demaratus)
- Arruns Tarquinius (Egerius)
- Arruns Tarquinius (brother of Tarquin the Proud)
