= Lucius Tarquinius =

Lucius Tarquinius may refer to:

- Lucius Tarquinius Collatinus
- Lucius Tarquinius Superbus
- Lucius Tarquinius Priscus
