= Silva Arsia =

The Silva Arsia is a forest or wooded area near Rome situated where the Roman and Veientine territories abutted. Legend has it that in 509 BCE the Romans heard the prophetic voice of Silvanus foretelling their victory over the Etruscans (Livy), 2.7.2). At the Battle of Silva Arsia that year the forces said to have been assembled by the Etruscan Tarquin were defeated, though with the loss of the Roman consul Lucius Junius Brutus. The forest, rich in timber essential for shipbuilding, had been seized from the Etruscans of Veii by Ancus Martius.

Since woodland was everywhere the province of Silvanus, there is no reason to connect the otherwise unknown Silva Arsia with the "forest of Silvanus [Silvanus luccus] outside the walls at a distance, all overgrown with a willow grove" noted in Plautus' Aulularia 674.
