= Tarquinia (mother of Lucius Brutus) =

Princess of the Roman Kingdom, mother of Lucius Junius Brutus

In Rome's early semi-legendary history, Tarquinia was the mother of Lucius Junius Brutus, who overthrew the monarchy and became one of Rome's first consuls in 509 BC. She had another son, who was put to death by king Lucius Tarquinius Superbus after he took the Roman rule from Servius.

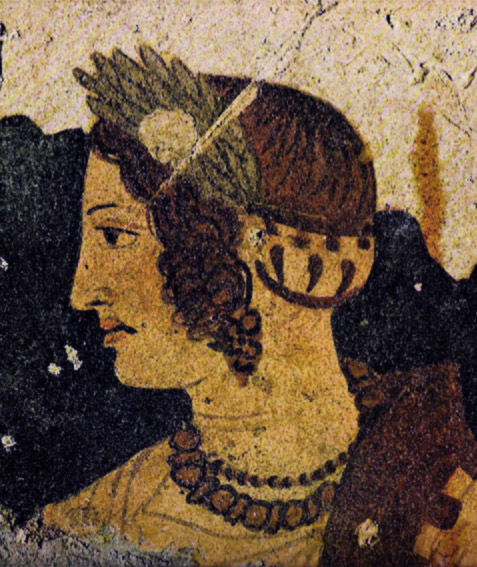
A detail of the wall paintings of the Etruscan Tomb of Orcus at Tarquinia. Not an image of Tarquinia but evocative of an Etruscan noblewoman during the 6th century BC.

== Popular culture ==
Tarquinia is a character in notable plays Brutus by John Howard Payne, and The Sibyl by Richard Cumberland.

== Bibliography ==
- Gantz, Timothy Nolan. "The Tarquin Dynasty." Historia: Zeitschrift für Alte Geschichte H. 4 (1975): 539-554.
- Mirković, Miroslava. "Missing persons in early Roman history, kinship and power." BIG 3 (2012): 9-24
