= Sextus Tarquinius =

Son of the last king of Rome

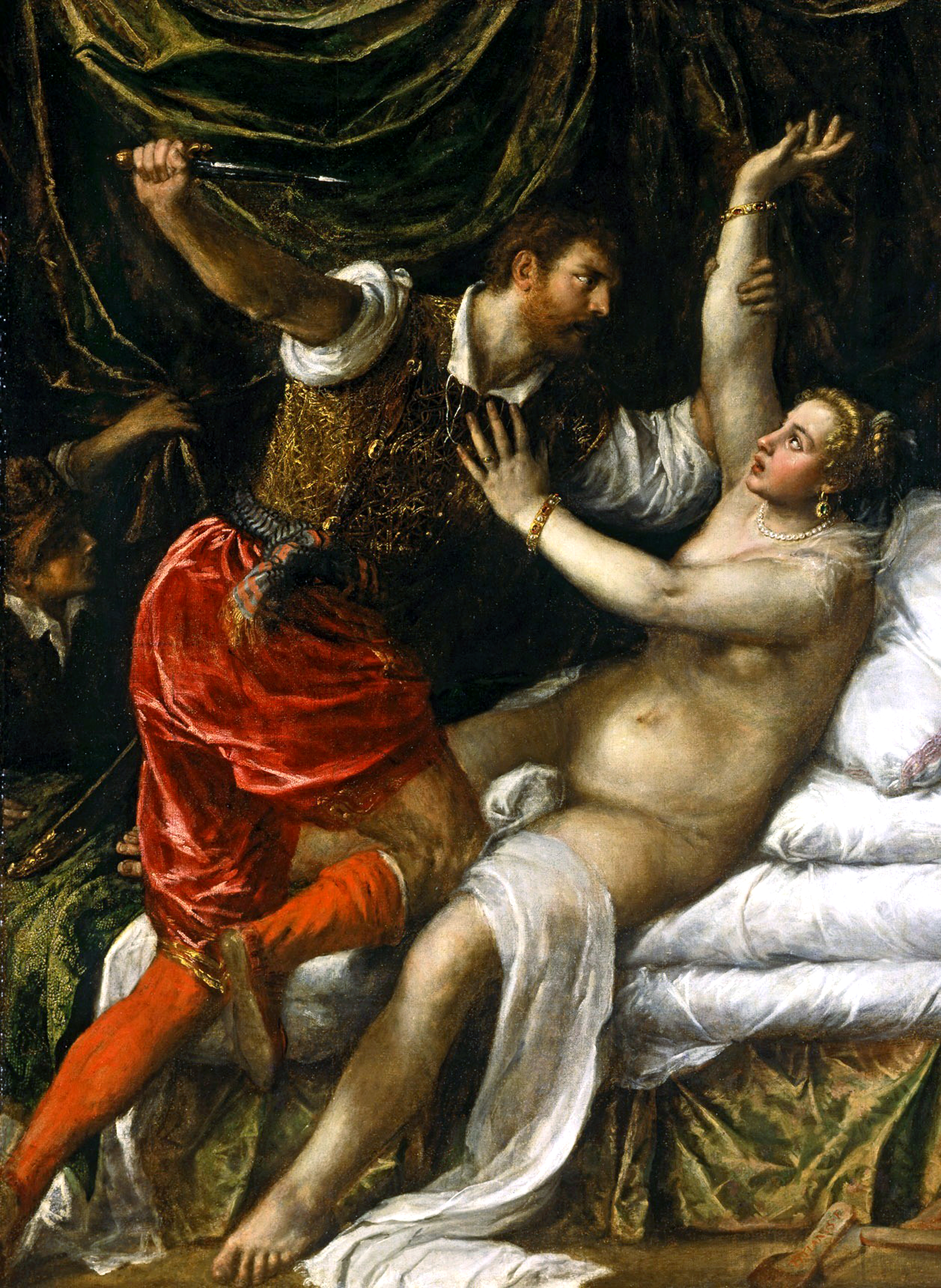
Titian's Tarquin and Lucretia (1571)

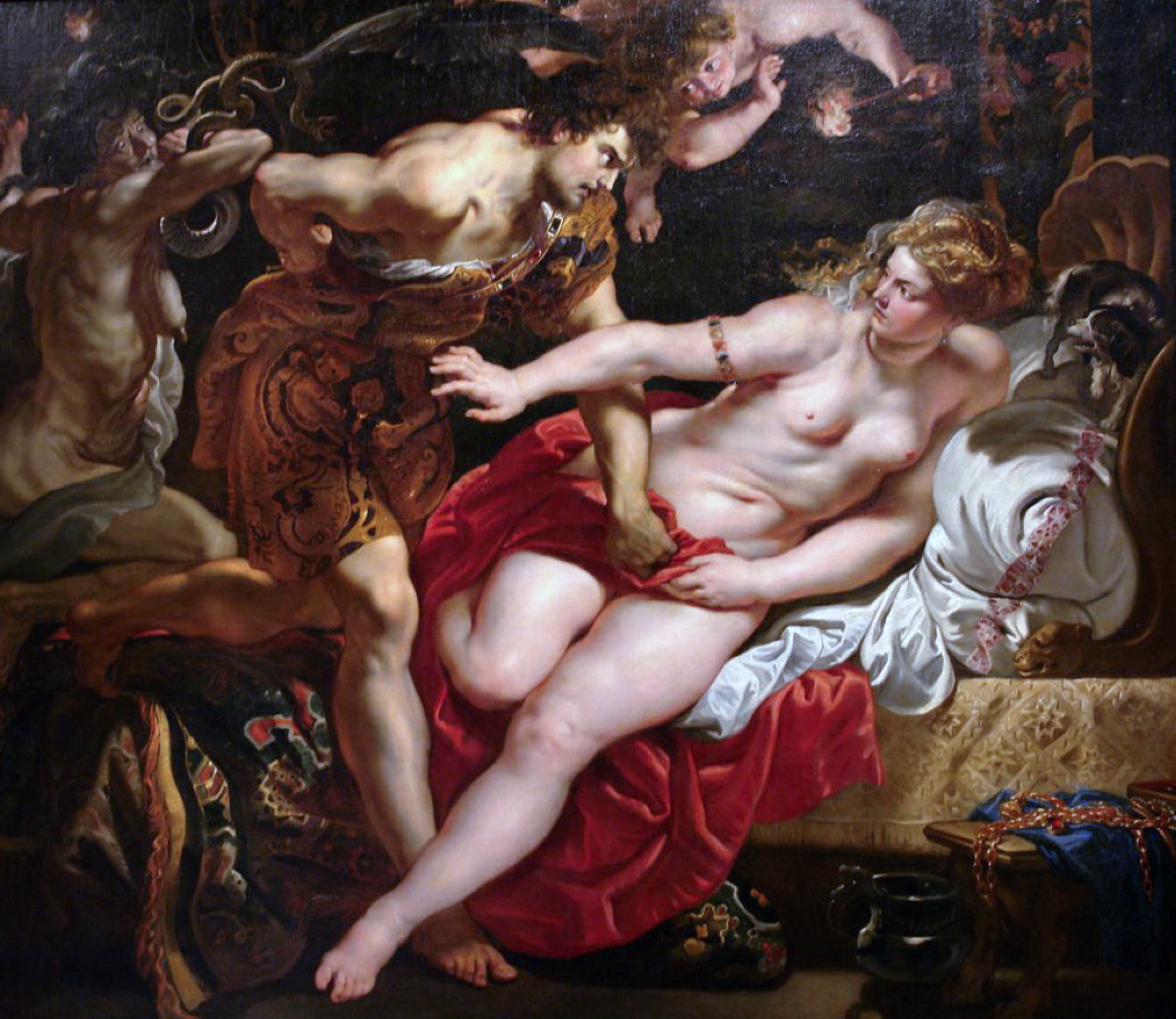
Tarquinius and Lucretia (1610), by Rubens (Hermitage Museum)

Sextus Tarquinius was one of the sons of the last king of Rome, Lucius Tarquinius Superbus. In the original account of the Tarquin dynasty presented by Fabius Pictor, he is the second son, between Titus and Arruns. However, according to Livy and Dionysius of Halicarnassus, he was either the third or first son, respectively. According to Roman tradition, his rape of Lucretia was the precipitating event in the overthrow of the monarchy and the establishment of the Roman Republic.

== Early life ==
Not much is known about Sextus Tarquinius' personal life as details about him are overshadowed by his actions. It is possible he was the youngest of the family as the name “Sextus” translates to sixth in English, implying he was a sixth son, with two living brothers and three who were either stillborn or died in infancy. Sextus and his family were of Etruscan descent. According to Livy, Tarquinius Superbus was having problems capturing the town of Gabii, so he sent Sextus to trick them into thinking he was defecting. Sextus became a general in their army before betraying them and allowing his father to capture the town.

== Rape of Lucretia ==
Tarquinius Superbus was besieging Ardea, a city of the Rutulians. The place could not be taken by force, and the Roman army lay encamped beneath the walls. While the king's sons, and their cousin, Tarquinius Collatinus, the son of Egerius, were feasting together, a dispute arose about the virtue of their wives. As nothing was happening in the field, they mounted their horses to pay a surprise visit to their homes. They first went to Rome, where they caught the king's daughters unaware at a splendid banquet. They then hastened to Collatia, and there, though it was late in the night, they found Lucretia, the wife of Collatinus, spinning amid her handmaids.

The beauty and virtue of Lucretia had fired the evil passions of Sextus Tarquinius. A few days later he returned to Collatia, where he was hospitably received by Lucretia as her husband's kinsman. In the dead of night, he stealthily entered her chamber with a drawn sword. He forced her to yield to his sexual advances by telling her the alternative was that he would kill her and one of her slaves, place their bodies together, and claim he had defended her husband's honour when he caught her having adulterous sex.

Soon after, Lucretia sent a message to both her husband and her father, Spurius Lucretius Tricipitinus, telling them everything. She then killed herself.

== Death and aftermath ==
The Roman tradition then has Sextus Tarquinius flee to Gabii, seeking safe haven but he was killed in revenge for his past actions. The revolt that follows in Rome, led by Lucretia's husband's friend and cousin, Lucius Junius Brutus, overthrows the monarchy of Lucius Tarquinius Superbus and brings about the beginning of the Roman Republic, with Brutus becoming the first consul with Collatinus as his colleague.

== Cultural references ==
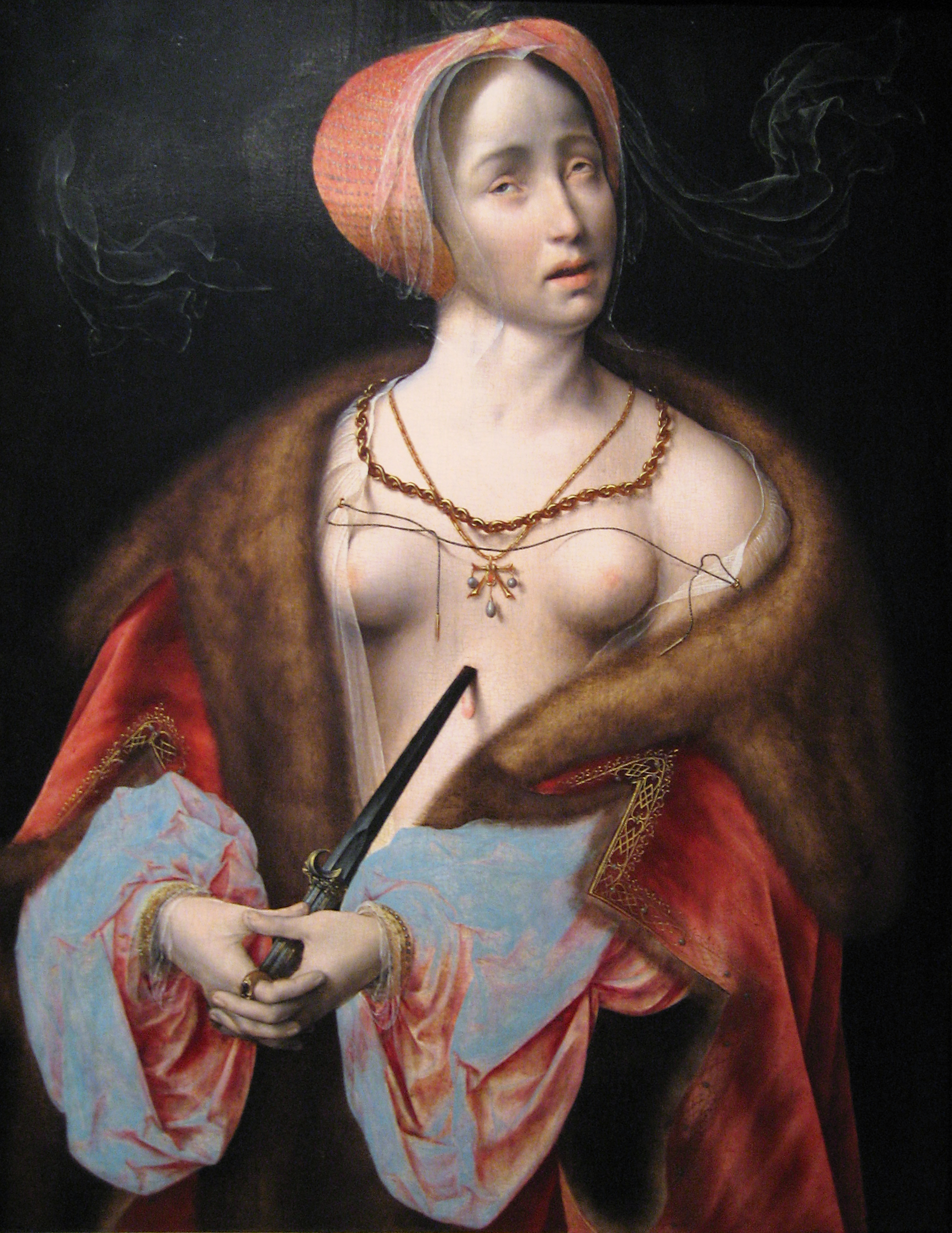
A depiction of Lucretia's suicide by Joos Van Cleve

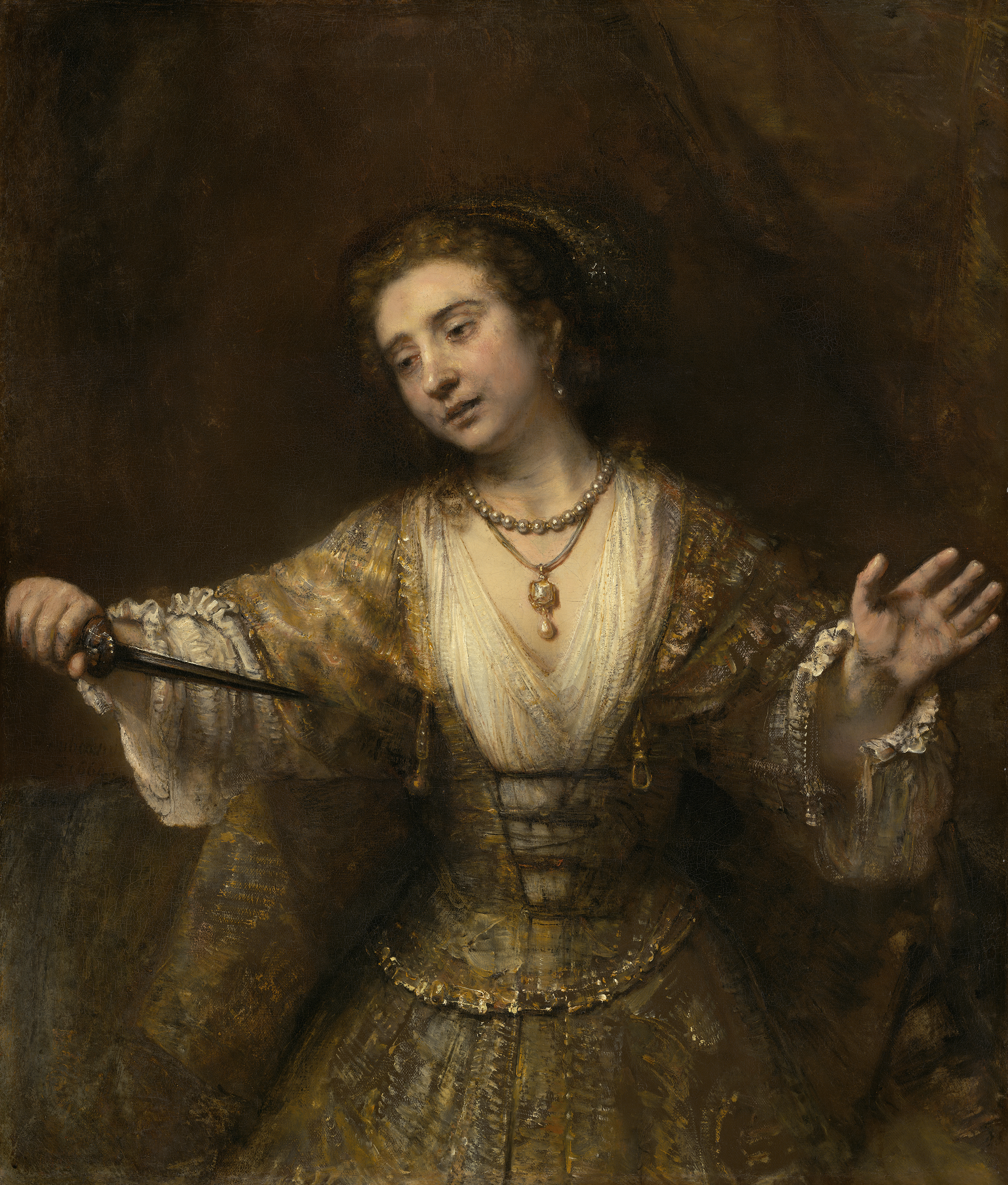
Rembrandt van Rijn, Lucretia, 1664, NGA 83

=== Art ===
Lucretia and Tarquin have been the subject of many paintings, including those by great artists.

Examples include:

- Tarquin and Lucretia by Titian, 1571
- Lucretia - Rembrandt (1664)
- Tarquin and Lucretia - Tintoretto (c.1578)
- Suicide of Lucretia - Joos Van Cleve (c. 1520–1525)

=== Literature ===
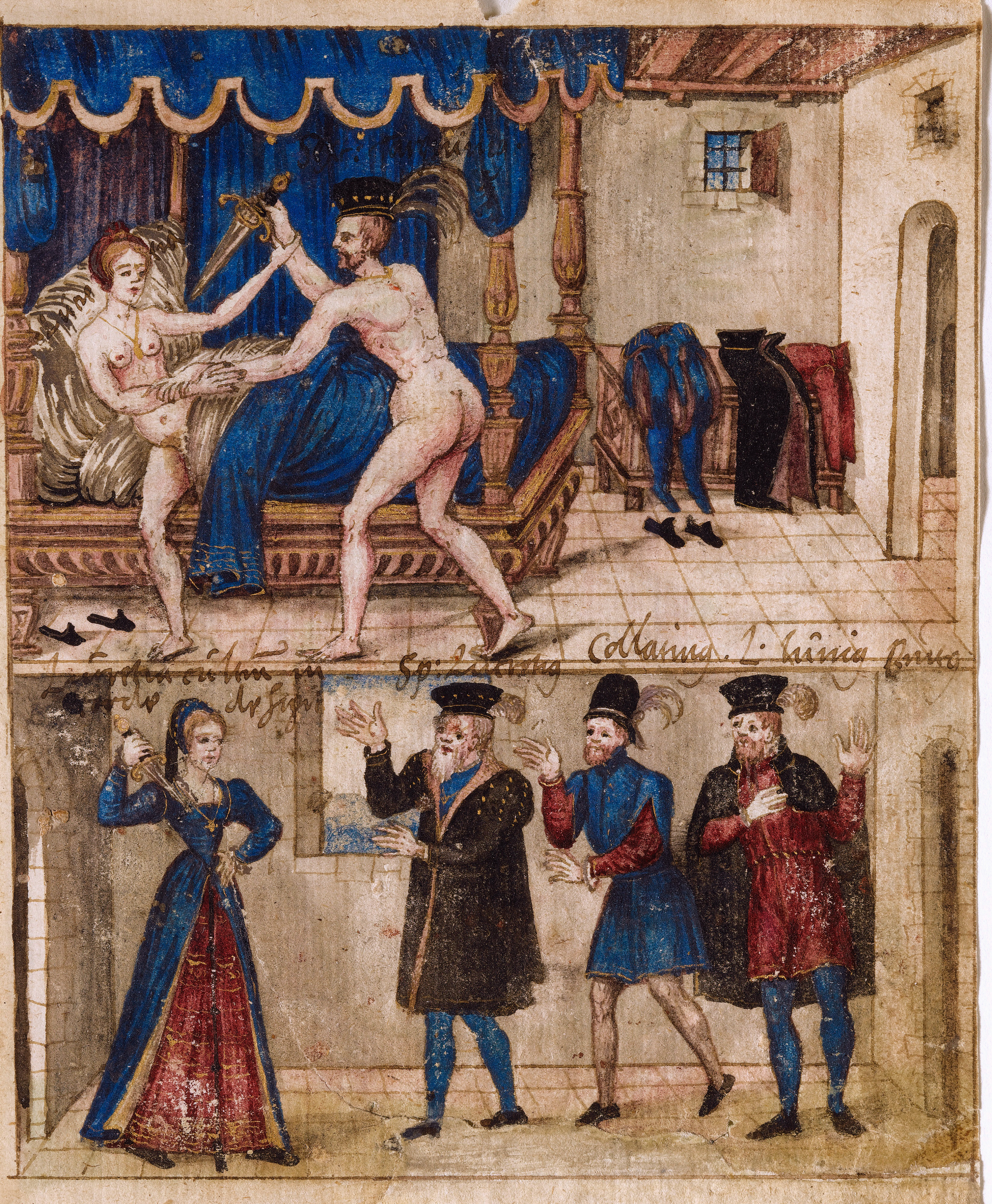
16th-century narrative illustration in the costume of the time, depicting Tarquin's attack, and Lucretia's demand for justice before witnesses

The story of Lucretia's rape is the subject of William Shakespeare's narrative poem The Rape of Lucrece, a work as long as many full-length plays, taking about two hours to recite. It has sometimes been performed as readers' theatre. Shakespeare alludes to Tarquin in his plays as well. In Cymbeline (Act 2, Scene 2), Iachimo has slipped into the sleeping Imogen's bedchamber, and compares himself to Tarquin:

... Our Tarquin thus
Did softly press the rushes, ere he waken'd
The chastity he wounded … .

In a soliloquy (known as the 'Dagger Soliloquy') from Macbeth, Macbeth alludes to Tarquin as a 'trope of stealth':

With Tarquin's ravishing strides, towards his design
Moves like a ghost. (Act 2 Scene 1, Lines 5-6)

In Shakespeare's history play Julius Caesar (Act 2, Scene 1), the character Brutus reflects on his ancestor's role in overthrowing Tarquin's father and the monarchy:

… Shall Rome stand under one man's awe?
What, Rome? My ancestors did from the streets of Rome the Tarquin drive, when he was call'd a king.

Tarquin, under his first name Sextus, is present with the Etruscan army in Thomas Babington Macaulay's Lays of Ancient Rome, when Lars Porsena, King of Clusium, attempts to restore the Tarquin dynasty to the Roman throne:

By the right wheel rode Mamilius, prince of the Latian name,

And by the left false Sextus, who wrought the deed of shame.

But when the face of Sextus was seen among the foes,
A yell that rent the firmament from all the town arose.
On the house-tops was no woman but spat toward him and hissed,

No child but screamed out curses, and shook its little fist.

Lucretia's rape is also the subject of Benjamin Britten's 1946 opera The Rape of Lucretia.
