= Overthrow of the Roman monarchy =

Semi-legendary overthrow of the Roman monarchy and foundation of the republic

The overthrow of the Roman monarchy was an event in ancient Rome that took place between the 6th and 5th centuries BC where a political revolution replaced the then-existing Roman monarchy under Lucius Tarquinius Superbus with a republic. The details of the event were largely forgotten by the Romans a few centuries later; later Roman historians presented a narrative of the events, traditionally dated to c. 509 BC, but it is largely believed by modern scholars to be fictitious.

The traditional account portrays a dynastic struggle in which the king's second son, Sextus Tarquinius, rapes a noblewoman, Lucretia. Upon revealing the assault to some Roman noblemen, she kills herself. The Roman noblemen, led by Lucius Junius Brutus, obtain the support of the Roman aristocracy and the people to expel the king and his family and create a republic. The Roman army, supporting Brutus, forces the king into exile. Despite a number of attempts by Lucius Tarquinius Superbus to reinstate the monarchy, the Roman people are successful in establishing a republic and thereafter elected two consuls annually to rule the city.

Many modern scholars dismiss this narrative as fictitious. There does not exist, however, any concrete evidence for or against it. Various scholars have dismissed aspects of the traditional story, from the historicity of almost all of its major characters to the overthrow's entire existence.

== Chronology ==
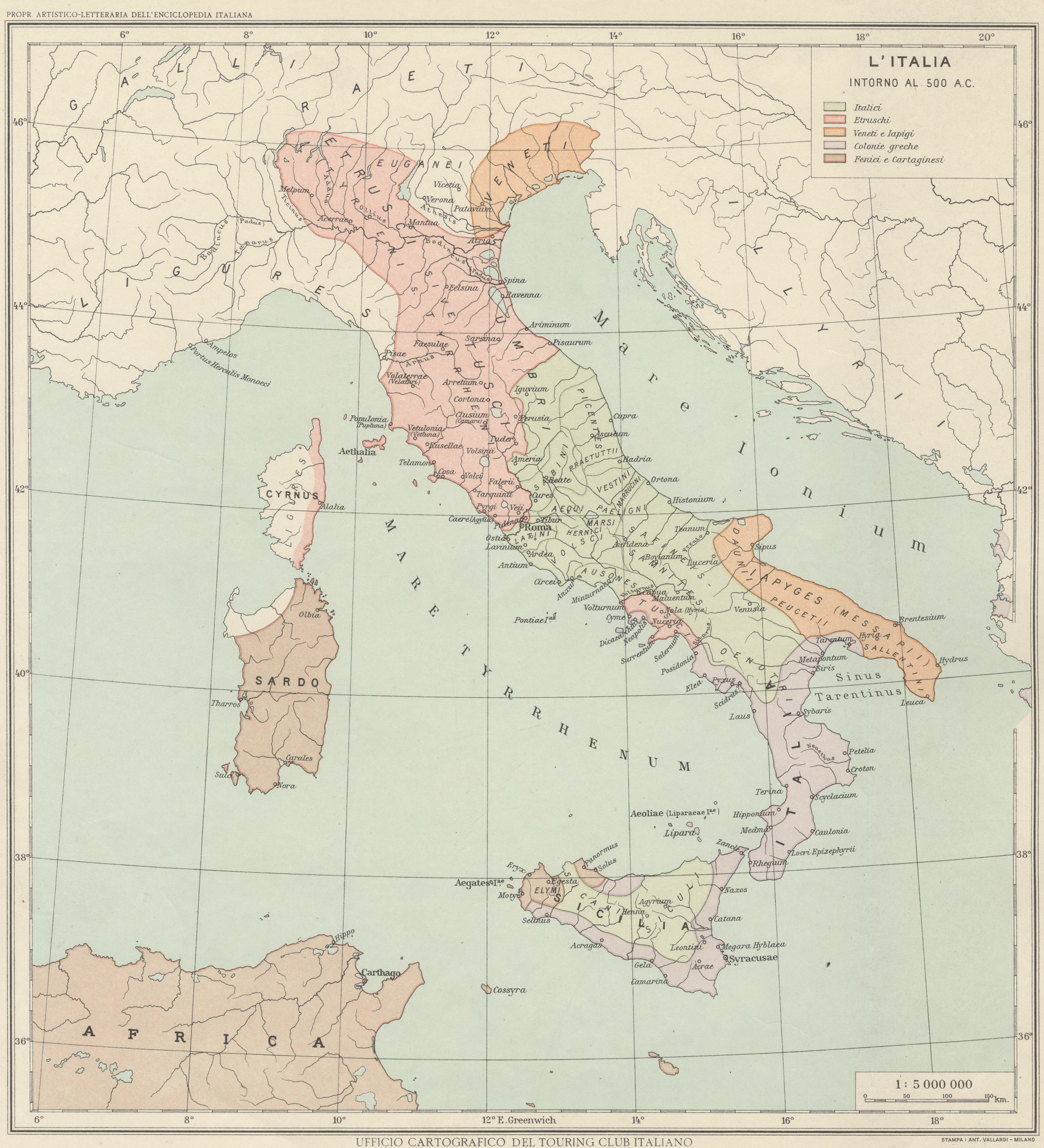
Map of Italy c. 500 BC

Scholars and the ancient sources themselves disagree on when the monarchy was overthrown and how old the resulting republic was. The most well-known date for the establishment of the republic, and therefore, the expulsion of the kings, is 509 BC. The specific dating to 509 BC emerges from the Varronian chronology, assembled during the late republic by Marcus Terentius Varro and later used by the fasti Capitolini, which likely – in the earlier period – runs four years behind the actual dates (i.e. Varronian year 344 corresponds to real year 340 BC).

The simplest way for the Romans to have inferred the age of their republic would have been to look at the list of consuls, of which two were elected every year, and count the number of consular pairs to surmise that the republic had existed for however many years corresponded. The fasti Capitolini – relying on the Varronian chronology – go back to 509 BC; Livy's list of consuls points to the republic having begun around 502–1 BC. Of course, this would have relied on the lists of consuls being accurate. Later historians reported dates roughly around that time, implying that the republic was founded:

- according to Dionysius of Halicarnassus, in the first year of the 68th Olympiad or the year Isagoras was eponymous archon at Athens (implying 508–7 BC),
- according to Polybius, 28 years before Xerxes crossed into Greece (implying 508 BC), or
- according to a census in 389 or 388 BC, 119 years before it (implying 508 or 507 BC),

A further account is given by Gnaeus Flavius, who asserted his temple to Concordia was dedicated 204 years after the dedication of the capitol. Because his temple was dedicated in 303 BC, this implies the capitol – which traditionally was held to have been dedicated in the first year of the republic – was dedicated in 507.

However, modern scholars are sceptical of much of this traditional chronology, especially that related to the dedication of the capitol. This relates mainly to debate over whether the earlier entries on the consular fasti are fabrications. Many historians have argued that the fasti are an unreliable anachronism of the late republic. Resolution of this topic is difficult, however, due to the absolute paucity of reliable sources such that – as the historian Fred Drogula remarks – "we have no way to prove or disprove most of the information contained [in the fasti]".

== Traditional account ==
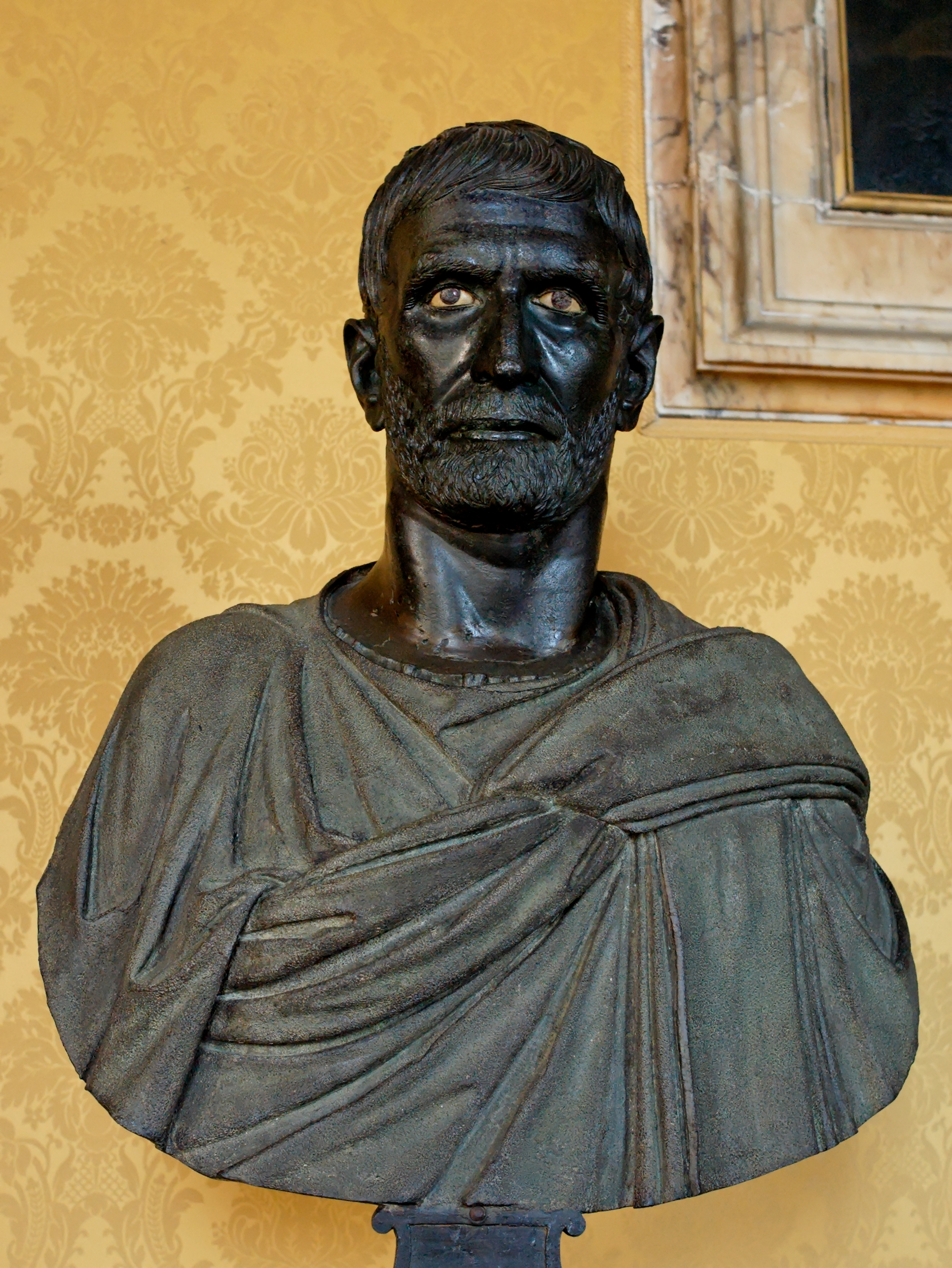
The Capitoline Brutus, an ancient Roman bust in the Capitoline Museums, is traditionally identified as a portrait of Lucius Junius Brutus.

Roman tradition held that there were seven kings of Rome who reigned from the city's founding (traditionally dated to 753 BC) by Romulus up to the reign of Tarquin. Archaeological evidence indicates there were kings in Rome; but most scholars do not believe that the traditional narrative is historical, ascribing its characters and details to later literary invention.

=== Account ===
According to the traditional account, a group of aristocrats overthrow the last king, Lucius Tarquinius Superbus, in response to the rape of the noblewoman Lucretia by the king's second son, Sextus Tarquinius; after revealing the rape to some noblemen, Lucretia commits suicide. The resulting outrage leads to an uprising against the ruling family, led by some of the king's relatives: Lucius Junius Brutus (the king's nephew), Lucius Tarquinius Collatinus (the king's cousin and Lucretia's husband), and Spurius Lucretius Tricipitinus (Lucretia's father). They are also joined by an influential friend, Publius Valerius Poplicola.

During this time, Tarquin has been conducting a war against Ardea, but rushes back to Rome on news of the coup; however, the city is shut before him and the coup leaders convince the army at Ardea to join them, leading to the expulsion of the king's sons. Brutus and Collatinus then become the first consuls – though in this early period they were called praetores (deriving from "leader") – with Brutus administering an oath before the people to never again tolerate a king in Rome and to kill anyone who attempts to restore the monarchy. He also proposes the banishment of all members of the Tarquin clan, leading to the banishment of his colleague Collatinus, who is replaced in office by Poplicola.

Soon after, Brutus' two sons, brothers of Brutus' wife, the Vitellii, the Aquilii, and relatives of Collatinus are discovered plotting to restore the monarchy. After the conspiracy is exposed by a slave, Brutus orders the death of his own sons and relatives. Meanwhile, Tarquin flees to Etruria and persuades various cities there to attack Rome and restore him to the throne. They are unsuccessful and defeated at the Battle of Silva Arsia, where Brutus falls in battle; Poplicola then returns to celebrate a triumph for victory over the Etruscans. Tarquin then requests aid from Lars Porsenna, the king of Clusium, who marches on Rome but is stopped by Horatius Cocles who defends a bridge alone against Porsenna's forces until it can be demolished. The heroism of the republic's youths and Rome's force of arms persuade Porsenna to give up his campaign.

Tarquin then appeals to his son-in-law, Octavius Mamilius of Tusculum, who mobilises the Latin League against Rome, until they too are defeated at the Battle of Lake Regillus (with the Romans receiving divine assistance from Castor and Pollux). With no more allies willing to attack the Romans, Tarquin leaves for a more permanent exile in Cumae before dying in 495 BC. The Roman government then falls into the hands of a group of aristocratic families, the patricians, who then elect magistrates from among their number, setting up conditions for the so-called Conflict of the Orders.

=== Development ===
The traditional account is likely derived from an earlier oral tradition. Barthold Georg Niebuhr, in the early nineteenth century, posited that the oral tradition may have been transmitted by poems sung or recited by bards at banquets during the republic. While this "ballad theory" is no longer widely accepted, T. P. Wiseman has more recently argued that the stories were transmitted by means of public performance of plays dramatising historical events. Such plays would be especially important in a society with low literacy, and are perhaps supported by archaeological evidence suggesting circulation of Greek myths and stories in Italy as far back as the archaic period. Attilio Mastrocinque, in A companion to Livy, for example, identifies Lucius Accius's tragedy Brutus as a source for some of the stories transmitted via Livy.

The sources we have today for the monarchy and the earliest parts of the republic are "notorious[ly] unreliable" literary sources: Livy, Dionysius of Halicarnassus, along with some supporting work from Plutarch's Life of Poplicola. The first literary history in Rome was written by Quintus Fabius Pictor c. 200 BC, centuries after the actual fall of the monarchy. These ancient historians read the fragmentary evidence from early Rome and reconstructed it such that it reflected their present and the surviving accounts of Livy and others are based on these writers rather than the original evidence. Thus:

Most scholars now agree that as a result of this process the details of Livy's political and military narrative are unreliable, amounting to reconstruction or plausible invention by Livy himself or by his sources.

Similarly,

Few can now doubt that earlier times tended, both consciously and unconsciously, to be re-created by a succession of Roman writers in light of the conditions in the third and second century. This was true even before [133 BC and] a new political climate in which historians had more urgent motives to project the [contemporaneous] political concerns and conflicts [on] earlier Roman history.

The stories that were written down by the time of the second century BC were done so by a time the Romans had lost any reliable sources on the fall of the monarchy; the purpose of that history as well was not to record the past in its terms, but for senators to describe and celebrate the republic as it existed in their time. Senatorial historiography served to advertise and embellish writers' families rather than describe political or social contexts already lost from memory. For example, T. P. Wiseman argues that many of the kings themselves and figures from the traditional story were ahistorical inventions of the fourth and third centuries BC. Wiseman and the more critical historians similarly dismiss even the earliest Roman historians, such as Fabius Pictor, as having had little knowledge of their own past beyond the fourth century BC. Other scholars go further, such as James Richardson, who believes that one of the central figures of the traditional story, Lucius Junius Brutus, "never existed".

As to the sources of the early republic generally, scholars usually accept the timing and occurrence of major events such as laws or battles. The narratives and details of the early republic are, therefore, doubtful even as the events are accepted in their most general terms. These difficulties are especially challenging when there is little middle ground between a critical reading of the sources and blind acceptance of self-contradictory and unsatisfactory sources: reconstructing the earliest parts of the republic based on a critical reading "runs the risk of simply producing [a] modern narrative with no basis at all in the evidence".

Much of the traditional narratives given from the ancient sources are distrusted by modern scholars, who especially note how ancient sources borrowed literary tropes to embellish sparse details – even if those details are accepted in terms of basic events such as the deposition of a corrupt and ineffective tyrant – from a fragmentary tradition.

=== Inconsistencies ===
By the time of Fabius Pictor, it seems the tales of the monarchy and its overthrow were already well developed. Many of the legendary events bear uncanny similarities to Greek tales: the rape of Lucretia perhaps being an adaptation of a similar affair which led to the expulsion of the Peisistratid tyranny in Athens also c. 510 BC. Moreover, sexual violence against innocent and virtuous young women was a common trope characterising tyrants and bad kings in ancient literature. Furthermore, the depiction of Collatinus' exile may be paralleled on the ostracism of Hipparchos, son of Peisistratus, and Tarquinius' war on Rome to retain his crown a parallel to Darius' attempt to restore the last Peisistratid tyrant to power in Athens. The extent, however, to which these Roman tales are copies of Greek tales or are genuine Roman tales embellished with Greek details is hotly debated.

The historian Tim Cornell makes the point that "as a dynastic history[,] the bare catalogue of events within the Tarquin family is, in itself, perfectly credible". Yet, it is only that dynastic history which is credible. The parts around it are less compatible: a palace coup orchestrated by possible royal claimants "sits rather uncomfortably with the notion [that the uprising was] inspired by republican ideals". The hatred of the Tarquinii is also incompatible with the election of Collatinus (a patrilineal member of the Tarquinii) and of Lucius Junius Brutus (related to the Tarquinii maternally). The intervention and defeat of Lars Porsenna also is questionable; other ancient accounts place him as defeating the nascent republic and imposing harsh peace terms.

The specific listing of the consuls in the first year of the republic is muddled and internally inconsistent. Tradition notes five: Lucius Junius Brutus, Lucius Tarquinius Collatinus, Publius Valerius Poplicola, Spurius Lucretius Tricipitinus, and Marcus Horatius Pulvillus. The sources themselves report inconsistencies: Livy indicates that in older writing, Lucretius' consulship was nowhere to be found. Polybius asserts that a treaty signed in the first year of the republic was dated to the consulship of Brutus and Horatius, even though the two, according to Livy and Dionysius, never held office at the same time. Cicero and Pliny themselves note a consular pair: that of Brutus and Valerius Poplicola, without Collatinus. Cassius Dio – according to a quote in Zonaras – dissents from the consular tradition entirely, saying that Brutus initially ruled alone but was given a colleague to prevent him from declaring himself king.

Gary Forsythe, a historian, argues more broadly that the names follow a pattern observed elsewhere in the ancient narrative sources of using names appearing in later years of the consular fasti for characters set in a previous year; he therefore dismisses Valerius and Lucretius' consulships in 509, speculating that Valerius was brought from the second year of the republic into the first so that the character could pass a lex Valeria which is itself fictitious and patterned on a real law from 300 BC. Furthermore, there is disagreement as to when the Capitoline temple, which was firmly associated with Horatius, was dedicated: Livy places it in the first year of the republic, while Tacitus and Dionysius both assign it to the third year of the republic, during Horatius' "second" consulship. Forsythe argues it is more likely that, to have the temple dedicated in the "momentous first year of the republic, later writers moved Horatius back two years and made him one of the first consuls".

The details aside, the traditional account supports the abolition of the monarchy c. 505 BC and the creation of a nascent republic. Not all modern scholars, however, accept a revolutionary new government as emerging so dramatically, and instead suggest that the kingship faded away into the attested and largely ceremonial rex sacrorum over decades, which the Roman republican historians compressed into a single dramatic event.

== Modern theories ==
There are many different theories about what happened at the start of the republic. The evidence is sufficiently sparse that many stories can be plausibly put forth. Modern views range from a semi-traditional account accepting the general facts of Roman tradition to hyper-critical accounts which argue that basically all of Rome's early history are the result of "artificial numerological exercises" and almost pure invention from association with other historical events.

=== Semi-traditionalist approach ===
The semi-traditionalist approach is built on a methodology of accepting Roman tradition as correct in terms of broad events, but discarding the narrative details themselves as fictitious. This theory was presented in its most complete form in Tim Cornell's 1995 book, Beginnings of Rome, and has some support among scholars.

Accepting those broad events, a domestic crisis provides a spark which causes a revolution in Rome c. 500 BC which overthrows the existing monarchy in the city; Rome becomes involved around this time in a greater conflagration affecting most of Tyrrhenian Italy, as around the same time there were also similar revolutions in other states.

Lars Porsenna intervenes in northern Latium as part of this conflagration, though his role in the downfall of the Tarquins or if Tarquin requested his assistance is unknown. Porsenna's Etruscan forces probably take Rome and move south to engage the Latins, but suffer a decisive defeat at Aricia. This story also has the added benefit of being supported by a Dionysius of Halicarnassus' history of Aristodemus of Cumae which confirms a defeat of Lars Porsenna and a date of 504 BC for the battle of Aricia from a separate Greek historical tradition.

Also suggesting anti-royal sentiment, around 500 BC, there is evidence in the archaeological record of destruction around the comitium. The royal sanctuary near Sant'Omobono at the foot of the Capitoline hill also was destroyed and abandoned for around a century. Cornell argues that the abandonment of the site at Sant'Omobono "contributes to the general impression... of an oligarchic coup against a populist tyranny" which was then forced to concede power to the army represented in the comitia centuriata. If the king had been in the habit of nominating two army officers for the approval from the comitia, "an attractive hypothesis is that... it was they who overthrew their master and took over the state".

Cornell also argues that this populist tyranny had for some time reduced the older traditionalist kingship into the ceremonial rex sacrorum, as its existence makes it "easy to speculate" that the title descended from a real king whose political powers had been reduced to ceremony only (as in the modern British monarchy or the archon basileus at Athens). One suggestion in this vein is that the previous king Servius Tullius ruled as a popular life-magistrate – a "tyranny" in ancient Greek terms – with some speculation that Tullius' supposed original name – Mastarna – is an Etruscan corruption of Latin magister (as in magister populi, one of the Roman dictator's other titles). The survival of a vestigial dictatorship, which was replaced by two consuls, also suggests similarity to other Latin towns which were ruled by dictators, including Alba Longa, which supposedly had replaced its king with two annually elected dictators before its destruction.

=== Intervention by Porsenna ===
Alternatively, another theory also accepted among scholars, including Gary Forsythe, is that the republic arose from Lars Porsenna's invasion itself. This theory was first presented by Andreas Alföldi in 1965. Accepting the tradition – specifically in Tacitus and Pliny the Elder – that Porsenna was successful in capturing Rome, he either abolishes the monarchy directly or puts the existing king to flight. Tarquin flees to other Latin cities for support while Porsenna uses Rome as a bridgehead to invade Latium. But after the Etruscan defeat at the Battle of Aricia in 504 BC, Porsenna is forced to withdraw and leave the Romans to face Latin attempts to restore Tarquin as king.

When the Latins are unable to prevail by force of arms at Lake Regillus, Tarquin then goes into exile in Cumae, leaving the republic standing. If this theory is true, it also would explain the appointment of Brutus and Collatinus: Porsenna would want to install someone to govern the city and members of the former royal house would lend legitimacy to his occupation and a co-equal pair would check against abuses. In this story, upon Porsenna's withdrawal, the two officials were retained and turned into the classical consuls.

This theory could also be plausibly combined with Cornell's semi-traditionalist account above, by proposing that Porsenna's intervention was opportunistically related to Rome's overthrow of its monarchy and the resulting unstable power struggle. There is also substantial archaeological evidence of destruction in central Etruria around at the end of the sixth century, suggesting major inter-state conflict, making the use of military force, even without an internal Roman political crisis, plausible.

=== Later foundation of the republic ===
Some scholars also reject the c. 500 BC dating of the republic's foundation. One hypothesis is that the Capitoline temple is older than the republic and that the republic's fasti were artificially lengthened to make the foundation of the temple and the republic line up. Robert Werner argued this in a 1963 monograph. He believed that some of the names of the fasti, mostly Etruscan ones, were fake, dismissing plebeian names under the assumption they could not hold the consulship. Doing so brings the republic's establishment to 472 BC, which coincides with the collapse of Etruscan power in central Italy.

Alternatively, the Capitoline temple's foundation may coincide with the introduction of eponymous magistrates – magistrates giving their names to the year – but without the formation of a republic (in which those magistrates held state power). Eponymous magistrates and a Roman kingdom are not necessarily incompatible: the ephors of Sparta were ruled by kings but still gave their names to the years; nor was the eponymous magistrate abolished during the Pisistratid tyranny in Athens. This hypothesis, proposed by Krister Hanell, argues that the fasti have nothing to do with the republic at all, which in his view emerged gradually when royal power faded away into the hands of the eponymous magistrates who became the consuls. Cornell argues that Hanell's hypothesis only makes sense if one assumes, ab initio, the republic's creation was gradual and that there is little evidence one way or the other.

Also alternatively, Einar Gjerstad argued that moving the expulsion of the kings to a cultural break c. 450 BC matches both with archaeological evidence of impoverishment and the disappearance of Etruscan names from the consular fasti, which synthesises both acceptance of the fasti and the argument that the republic's foundation might not coincide with that of the temple's. Gjerstad's theory, however, requires the end of Etruscan rule to coincide with the monarchy's expulsion, for which there is no evidence.

Cornell rejects all of these views as overly revisionist and dependent on "a complex mixture of archaeological and literary data" while having strong assumptions about the changes that the expulsion of the kings created. More critical historians, like Forsythe, however, believe Cornell's treatment is "too trusting and overly optimistic" about the nature of the source material.

=== Critical approach ===
Scholars have recognised that many of the traditional stories were invented by injecting into the past many later events and literary tropes with dates likely copied over from other Hellenistic historical traditions. In those traditions, the large number of events in various societies that lacked firm dates was resolved by assigning the same dates to similar events in those different societies.

That early Roman history was reconstructed (or, less generously, in Cicero's description "a forgery") was well known even to the Romans themselves. The primary sources of Roman history to the ancient Romans were lists noting the achievements of family ancestors and priestly notices, all of which lacked chronological significance. Nor were these stories necessarily integrated: likely originating as self-contained oral histories, the tales of the first consuls (Brutus etc.) are "clearly independent and mutually inconsistent" but for the primary sources' purposeful harmonisation. Specific years could then be assigned by synchronism with various other events: even for major events, such as the Gallic sack of Rome, the surviving ancient historians disagreed at what occurred in what years.

For example, Alexander Koptev argued in 2010 that the placement of dates in early Roman history was rooted in a single source by Timaeus of Tauromenium, which "as chronological urvater... shaped the chronological skeleton of Roman history, basing it on a comparison with the Hellenistic world", directly influencing the annalists, whose works flow forward to the sources we have today. Timaeus performed "artificial numerological exercises" which provided a chronology onto which dimly remembered oral stories, like that of the expulsion of the kings, could be placed. Here, Timaeus' dating the start of the republic was an arbitrary synchronism: it started in merely the same year in which Cleisthenes established democracy in Athens (510–9 BC). This also neatly explains why Roman history accords with Dionysius' discussion of war between Cumae and Etruria: it was placed there deliberately.

Similarly, some historians believe that Livy's account of the early republic is structured by a cyclic approach to history in which a rise in moral virtues precedes their decline, with a period of a great year consisting of 360–365 years. Starting with Romulus, the cycle reaches a peak under king Servius Tullius before a second founding under Camillus, completing the cycle. This causes a second peak in the time of Scipio Africanus before Augustus enters as the figure to re-found Rome again and restart the great year, with Livy suggesting that Romulus, Camillus, and Augustus are coequal heroic figures.

The critical approach also stresses the extent to which the sources available today were shaped and moulded by contemporary political concerns and ideologies with an emphasis on furthering favourable political narratives on Rome's early history.

== Legacy ==
=== Political influence ===
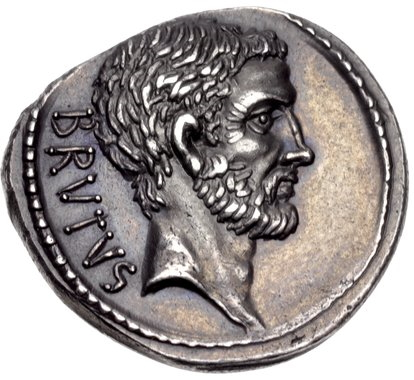
A coin depicting Lucius Junius Brutus, minted by his descendant Marcus Junius Brutus during his term as triumvir monetalis in 54 BC

The putative role of Lucius Junius Brutus in the abolition of the kings was commemorated by the later Romans with a statue on the Capitoline Hill – holding an unsheathed sword – in front of the statues of the seven kings of Rome. The story of his overthrow was also referenced by the public as part of a campaign to convince one of his descendants, Marcus Junius Brutus, to organise the assassination of Julius Caesar.

Praise of Brutus, both the one who expelled the kings and the one who killed Caesar, was common during the French Revolution; the name was appropriated as an exemplar of civic republican virtues and citizenship. Boys, and whole towns, were named after Brutus. The leaders of the French Revolution, according to Mona Ozouf, drew on "legendary antiquity... to rise to the level of the events which they were living". Contemporaneously, in the debate over ratification of what would become the Constitution of the United States, the authors of The Federalist Papers signed with the pseudonym "Publius", a reference to the Publius Valerius Poplicola of the Livian narrative.

=== In literature and the arts ===
In the ancient world, the playwright Lucius Accius composed a tragedy depicting the events of the overthrow, titled Brutus, that combined elements from Greek myth and tragic dramas with the Roman story.

Shakespeare's 1594 poem Lucrece "enjoyed immense acclaim when it was first published... telling the story of Lucretia in melodramatic rather than narrative fashion". His play Macbeth also borrowed elements from the ancient stories of Tarquin's fall: Attilio Mastrocinque argues Macduff, Malcolm, and Siward of Northumbria are modelled on Brutus, Lucretius, Collatinus, and Poplicola. Nathaniel Lee, an English playwright, dramatised the story of Lucretia and the overthrow of the Tarquins in a late 17th century play, Lucius Junius Brutus.

Voltaire wrote a play, Brutus (c. 1730), dramatising Lucius Junius Brutus' overthrow of Tarquin, which, while not immediately successful, became enormously popular in the 1790s during the French Revolution after abolition of the French monarchy and the establishment of a republic. Thomas Babington Macaulay also published a poetic telling of the expulsion in Lays of Ancient Rome which was "once extremely well known".

The death of Lucretia and the death of Brutus' sons also were subjects of many neoclassical paintings in the late 18th and early 19th centuries.

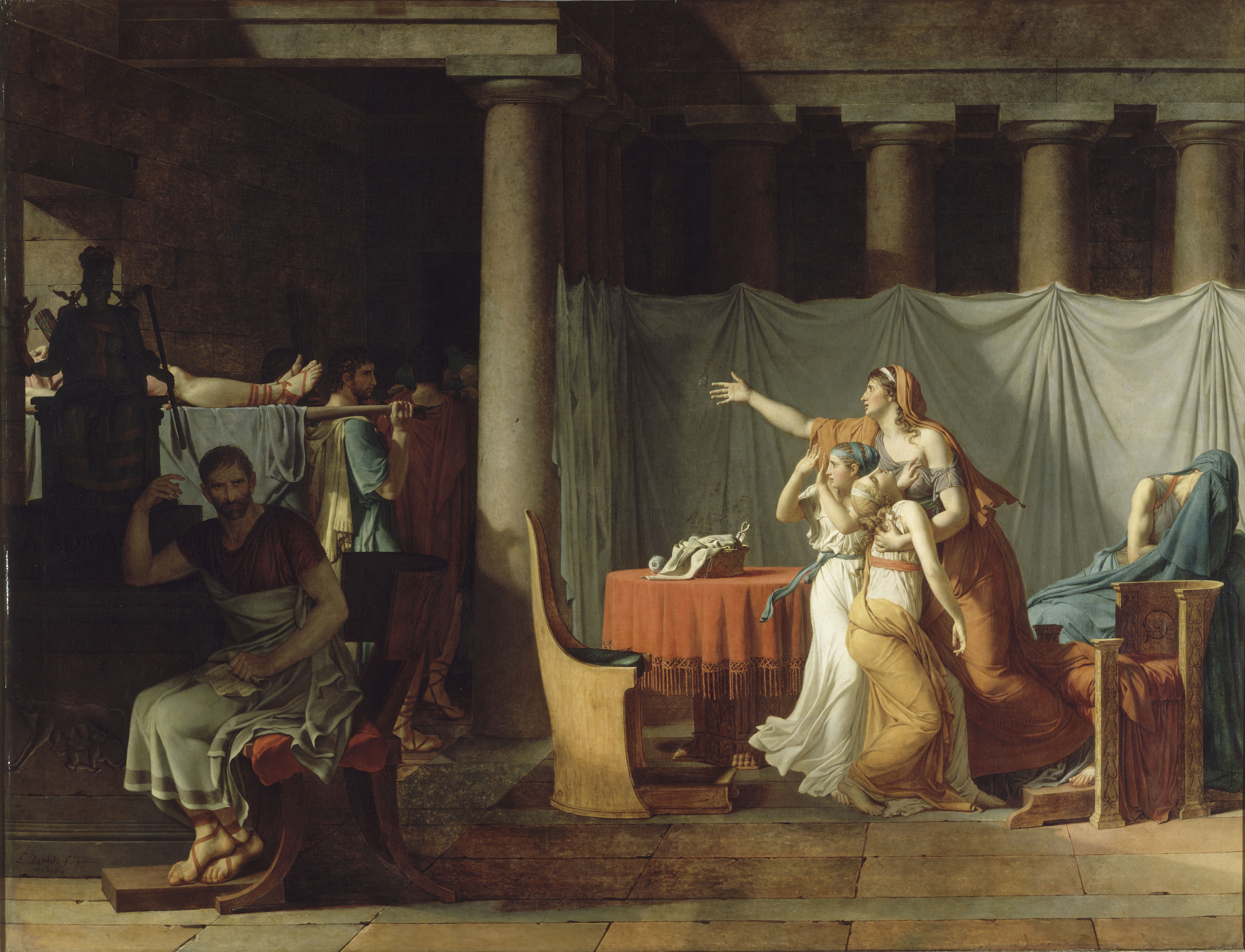
Jacques-Louis David's 1789 painting The Lictors Bring to Brutus the Bodies of His Sons, depicting Brutus contemplating the fate of his sons

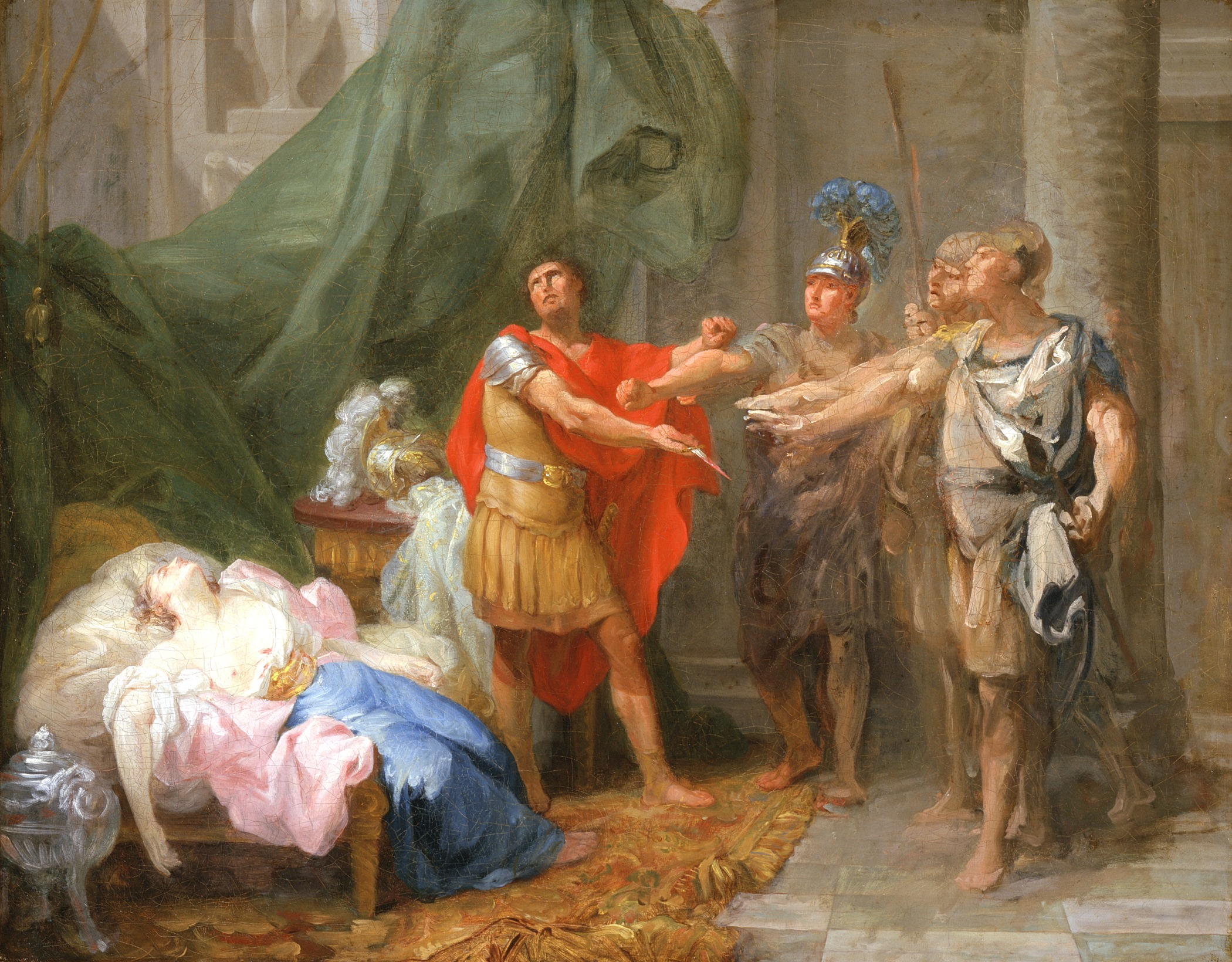
Jacques-Antoine Beaufort's 1771 depiction of Brutus' oath and Lucretia's death

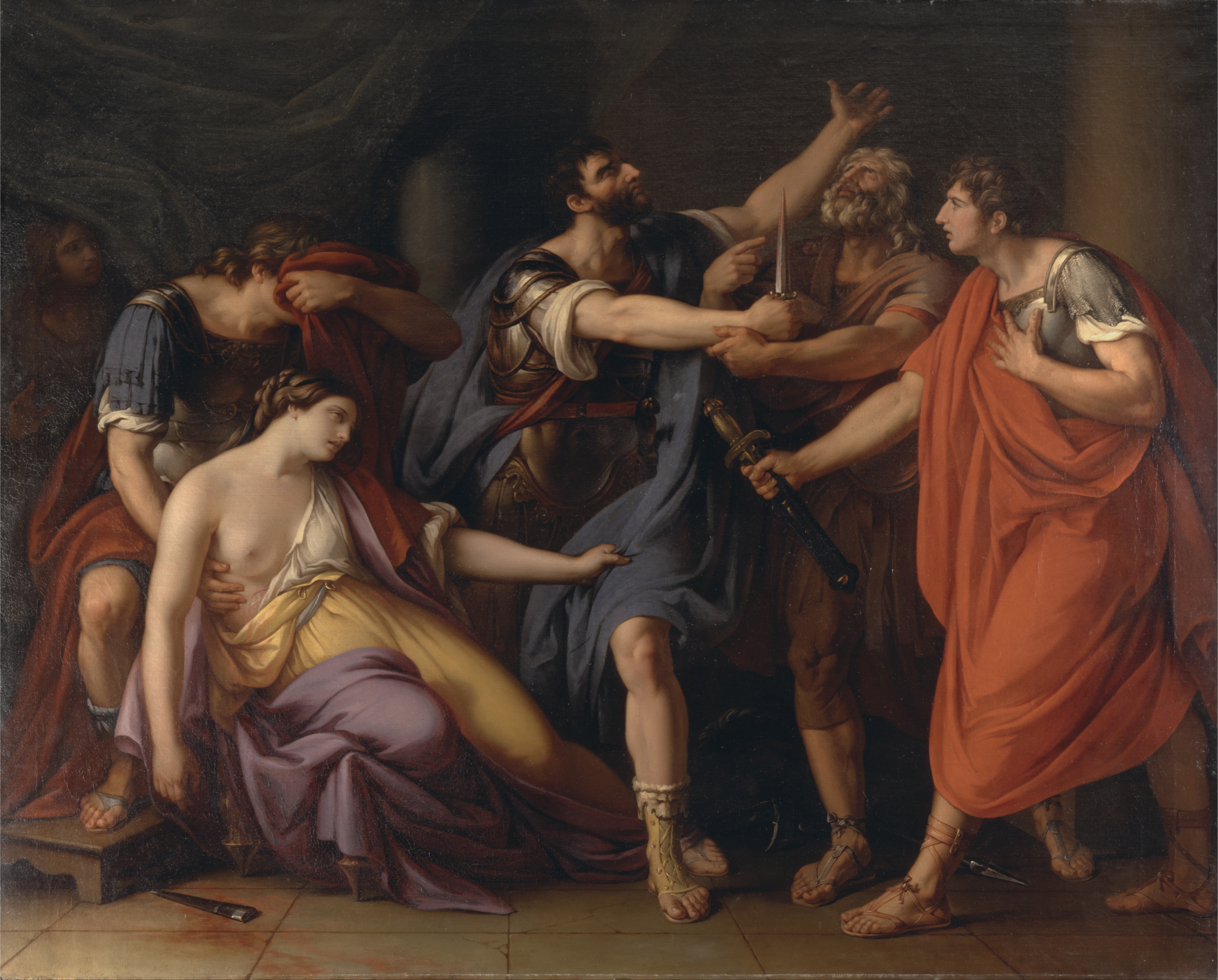
Gavin Hamilton's 1763–64 depiction of Brutus' oath and Lucretia's death

== See also ==
- Democracy in Europe
