= Arruns Tarquinius (son of Demaratus) =

Brother of Tarquin the Elder

Arruns Tarquinius was the younger son of Demaratus of Corinth, who migrated to the Etruscan city of Tarquinii in the seventh century BC. He died shortly before his father, leaving his wife pregnant. When Demaratus died, he left no inheritance for his grandson, also named Arruns, who was thus born into poverty, although Demaratus had been wealthy. The child came to be called Egerius, meaning "the needy one."

Demaratus' elder son, Lucius, migrated to Rome, where he eventually rose to the throne as Lucius Tarquinius Priscus. After subduing the Latin town of Collatia, Tarquin placed his nephew in charge of the Roman garrison there. Egerius was the father of Lucius Tarquinius Collatinus, one of the first Roman consuls in 509 BC.

== Bibliography ==
- Dionysius of Halicarnassus, Romaike Archaiologia (Roman Antiquities).
- Titus Livius (Livy), History of Rome.
- Publius Ovidius Naso (Ovid), Fasti.
- Dictionary of Greek and Roman Biography and Mythology, William Smith, ed., Little, Brown and Company, Boston (1849).
- Encyclopædia Britannica, Eleventh Edition (1911).
