= Titus Tarquinius =

Eldest son of Lucius Tarquinius Superbus, the last king of Rome

Titus Tarquinius was one of the sons of the last king of Rome, Lucius Tarquinius Superbus. According to Livy and fragments of the first Roman historian, Fabius Pictor, he was the eldest son; however, Dionysius of Halicarnassus claims he was not.

Dionysius claims that each of the brothers were regents of different towns: Titus was regent of Signia. In spite of their duties, Livy and Dionysius record that Titus and his younger brother Arruns, along with his cousin Lucius Junius Brutus travelled to consult the Delphic oracle to have an omen witnessed by the king interpreted.

After the overthrow of the Roman monarchy, traditionally dated to 509 BC, Livy reports that Titus went into exile with his father at Caere. According to Dionysius, Titus is killed fighting for his father at the Battle of Lake Regillus. According to Livy, Titus survived the battle, albeit with severe injuries. The date of the battle in Livy is unclear: Livy himself noted two traditions, which would date the battle to either 499 or 496 BC.

== Cultural depiction ==
Titus Tarquinius is one of the principal characters in the libretto Il trionfo di Clelia of Metastasio, although he is usually identified incorrectly as his father, Lucius Tarquinius Superbus. Metastasio's own plot summary published in the original libretto for a performance in Vienna in 1762 with music by Johann Adolph Hasse confirms the correct identification. As Tarquinio in Metastasio's libretto, he is portrayed as ruthless and deceitful, both as a lover and as a military commander who participated in a siege of Rome to restore his family to the throne.
