= Tarquinian conspiracy =

Conspiracy in ancient Rome of 509 BC to reinstate the monarchy

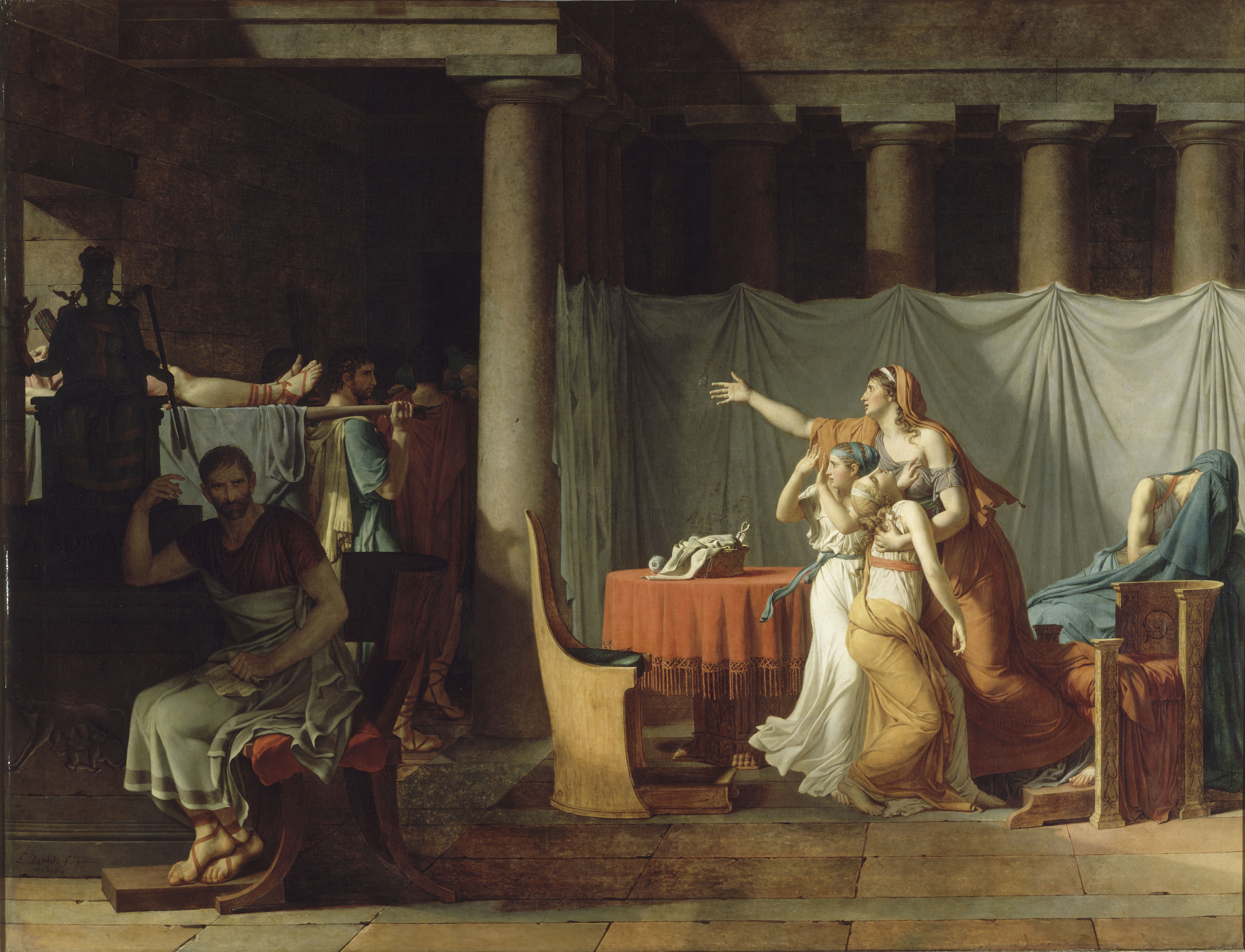
The Lictors Bring to Brutus the Bodies of His Sons by Jacques-Louis David (1784)

The Tarquinian conspiracy was a conspiracy amongst a number of senators and leading men of ancient Rome in 509 BC to reinstate the monarchy, and to put Lucius Tarquinius Superbus back on the throne. The conspirators were discovered and executed. The story is part of Rome's early semi-legendary history.

== Background ==
In 509 BC the Roman monarchy was overthrown as a result of general resentment at the behaviour of the king Tarquinius Superbus, and especially his son Sextus Tarquinius who had raped Lucretia, a Roman woman of noble background. A coup, led by Lucius Junius Brutus, resulted in the expulsion of the royal family. The Roman Republic was established, and consuls were elected to govern the city on an annual basis.

== Conspiracy formed, but discovered ==
Brutus was elected as one of Rome's first two consuls in 509 BC. In that year ambassadors from the royal family arrived in Rome to seek to persuade the senate to return to the royals their personal effects which had been seized during the coup. In secret, while the Roman Senate debated the request, the ambassadors sought supporters of the monarchy in Rome to form a conspiracy to re-admit the royal family to the city. Two brothers of Brutus' wife, of the Vitellii, both of whom were senators, were chief amongst the conspiracy, along with three brothers of the Aquilii, and other leading men whose names are no longer recorded. Two of Brutus' sons, Titus Junius Brutus and Tiberius Junius Brutus joined them.

However, a slave of the Vitelii, having witnessed a meeting of the conspirators at his master's house (which Plutarch claims involved a horrific oath by human sacrifice and cannibalism), alerted the consuls who immediately seized the ambassadors and the conspirators without great tumult. (Note: The conspiracy was reported to Brutus by his slave Vindex, who was freed in reward. This event was commemorated annually at the inauguration of new consuls for centuries to come, by the emancipation of a slave chosen for this purpose.)

== Punishment ==
The ambassadors of the royal family had persuaded the conspirators to confirm their dedication to the royalist cause in writing, and therefore the guilt of the conspirators was not in doubt.

The ambassadors were released, out of respect for the law of nations. However the traitors were condemned to death, including the sons of Brutus.

The consuls sat upon the tribunal to witness the execution. The lictors were dispatched to carry out the punishment. The traitors were stripped naked, beaten with rods, and then beheaded. Brutus the consul is said to have burst forth with emotion at times during the punishment of his sons, although elsewhere he is said to have watched stoically while the punishment was carried out.

The slave who had revealed the conspiracy was granted his freedom and status as a Roman citizen, and was also awarded a sum of money as reward.
