= Spurius Lucretius Tricipitinus =

Semi-legendary figure in Roman history

Spurius Lucretius
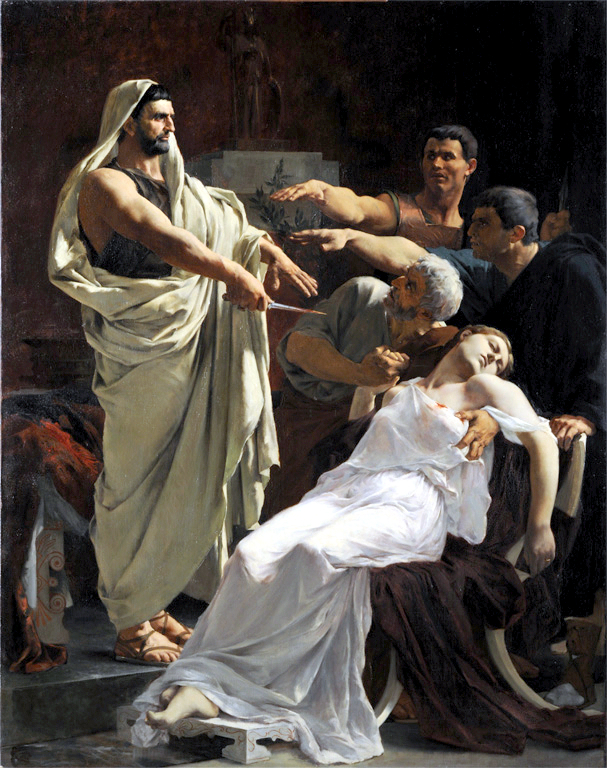
- Lucretius (in the middle marked by white hair) holding the arm of his dead daughter.

Consul of the Roman Republic
- In office 1 March 509 BC – 3 March 509 BC Serving with Publius Valerius Publicola
- Preceded by: Lucius Junius Brutus, Publius Valerius Publicola
- Succeeded by: Marcus Horatius Pulvillus, Publius Valerius Publicola

Personal details
- Born: Unknown; Ancient Rome
- Died: 3 March 509 BC; Ancient Rome
- Children: Lucretia

Spurius Lucretius Tricipitinus is a semi-legendary figure in early Roman history. He was the first Suffect Consul of Rome and was also the father of Lucretia, whose rape by Sextus Tarquinius, followed by her suicide, resulted in the dethronement of King Lucius Tarquinius Superbus, therefore directly precipitating the founding of the Roman Republic. It is believed that Lucretius and his accomplishments are at least partly mythical and most ancient references to him were penned by Livy and Plutarch.

== Founding of the Republic ==
While the king of Rome was away at the siege of Ardea, his son, Sextus Tarquinius, raped Lucretia, the wife of the king's nephew. Sextus returned to camp. The next day Lucretia dressed in black, and went to her father's house in Rome and cast herself down in the suppliant's position (embracing the knees), weeping. Asked to explain herself she insisted on first summoning witnesses and after disclosing the rape called on him and them for vengeance, a plea that could not be ignored, as she was speaking to the chief magistrate of Rome. While they were debating she drew a concealed dagger and stabbed herself in the heart. She died in her father's arms, with the women present keening and lamenting. "This dreadful scene struck the Romans who were present with so much horror and compassion that they all cried out with one voice that they would rather die a thousand deaths in defence of their liberty than suffer such outrages to be committed by the tyrants."

In the alternative version she did not go to Rome but sent for her father at Rome and her husband at the camp at Ardea, asking them to bring one friend each; her father selected Publius Valerius Publicola and her husband Lucius Junius Brutus. The men found Lucretia in her room. There she explained what happened and exacted an oath of vengeance: "Pledge me your solemn word that the adulterer shall not go unpunished." While they were discussing the matter, she drew the poignard and stabbed herself in the heart.

During the revolution, Lucretius was put in command of Rome whilst Brutus went to the camp of the army at Ardea.

== Early Republic ==
Brutus and Lucius Tarquinius Collatinus (both cousins of the king) were elected as Rome's first consuls. Collatinus came under popular pressure to resign because his name reminded the people of the deposed king. Brutus invited him to liberate the Romans from this hated name now that he had liberated them from the hated king. Livy records Lucretius' involvement in the matter:

"At first Collatinus was struck dumb with astonishment at this extraordinary request; then, when he was beginning to speak, the foremost men in the commonwealth gathered round him and repeatedly urged the same plea, but with little success. It was not till Spurius Lucretius, his superior in age and rank, and also his father-in-law, began to use every method of entreaty and persuasion that he yielded to the universal wish. The consul, fearing that after his year of office had expired and he returned to private life, the same demand should be made upon him, accompanied with loss of property and the ignominy of banishment, formally laid down the consulship, and after transferring all his possessions to [the Latin town of] Lanuvium, withdrew from the state."

Lucretius is during this period mentioned as holding the office of either Interrex (by Dionysius of Halicarnassus), appointed by the Tribunus Celerum, Brutus, or Praefectus Urbi (by Livy and Tacitus) appointed by the King prior to the revolution and being responsible for the holding of the consular elections in either of these roles.

== Suffect-Consulship ==
After Collatinus' departure, Valerius was elected to replace him. Brutus was soon afterwards killed in the Battle of Silva Arsia. After some delay, Valerius held elections to replace Brutus, and Lucretius was chosen as suffect consul in the same year, 509 BC. However, being of advanced age, Lucretius died a few days afterwards. He was succeeded in office by Marcus Horatius Pulvillus.

== See also ==
- Lucretia gens

Political offices
Preceded by Lucius Iunius Brutus; Publius Valerius Poplicola; 509 BC	Consul (Suffect) of the Roman Republic with Publius Valerius Publicola; 509 BC	Succeeded by Publius Valerius Poplicola; Marcus Horatius Pulvillus (suffect); 509 BC
