= Arruns Tarquinius (Egerius) =

Roman nobleman of the late Kingdom

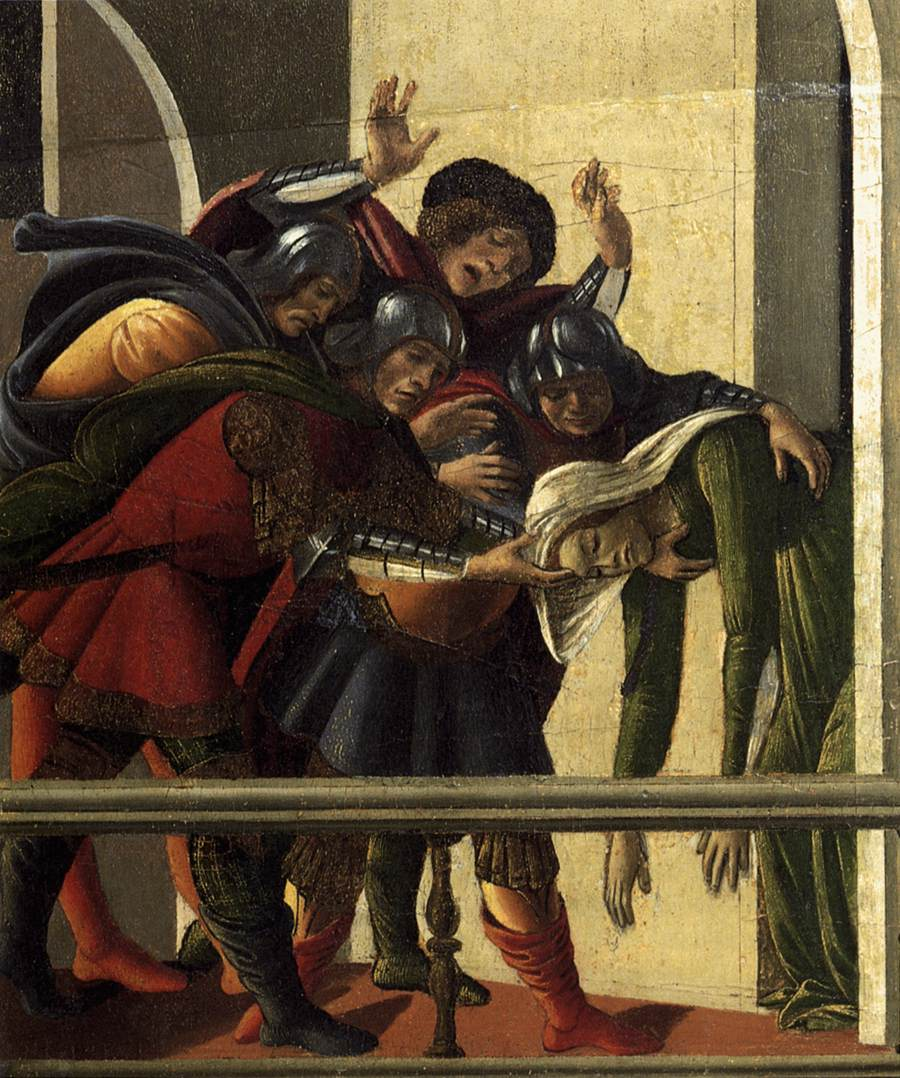
While her husband is away, the virtuous Lucretia is raped by Sextus Tarquinius, the king's son. She is found unconscious by her husband and his companions.

Arruns Tarquinius, commonly called Egerius, was a member of the royal family of early Rome.

His father was Arruns Tarquinius, son of Demaratus of Corinth. Demaratus had settled at Tarquinii during the seventh century BC, and married an Etruscan noblewoman. They had two sons, Lucius and Arruns. Arruns died shortly before his father, leaving his wife pregnant. Not knowing of his grandson, Demaratus left him no inheritance, and so Arruns was born into poverty despite his grandfather's wealth. For this reason, the child was called Egerius, meaning "the needy one."

At the urging of his wife, Tanaquil, Lucius Tarquinius migrated to Rome, where he found favour with the king, Ancus Marcius. Ultimately, Tarquin succeeded Marcius as the fifth King of Rome. After subduing the Latin town of Collatia, Tarquin placed his nephew in command of the Roman garrison there.

Arruns' son was Lucius Tarquinius Collatinus, one of the first Roman consuls in 509 BC. The rape of Collatinus' wife, Lucretia, by his cousin, Sextus Tarquinius, was the event that sparked the expulsion of the Roman kings. Ironically, public hatred of the Tarquins led Collatinus himself to resign the consulship and go into exile.

== Bibliography ==
- Titus Livius (Livy), History of Rome.
- Dictionary of Greek and Roman Biography and Mythology, William Smith, ed., Little, Brown and Company, Boston (1849).
- Encyclopædia Britannica, Eleventh Edition (1911).
