= Lucius Junius Brutus =

Semi-legendary 6th-century BC founder of Roman Republic

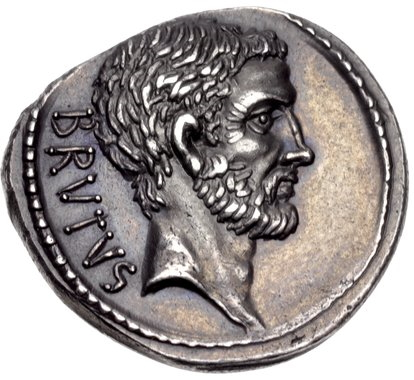
- Portrait of Lucius Junius Brutus on a denarius minted by Marcus Junius Brutus in 54 BC
- Died: c. 509 BC; Silva Arsia, Rome
- Cause of death: Killed in Action (Battle of Silva Arsia)
- Known for: Foundation of the Roman Republic
- Office: Consul (509 BC, Varronian)
- Spouse: Vitellia
- Children: Titus Junius Brutus and Tiberius Junius Brutus
- Parents: Marcus Junius Brutus (father); Tarquinia (mother)

Lucius Junius Brutus (died c. 509 BC) was the semi-legendary founder of the Roman Republic and traditionally one of its two first consuls. Depicted as responsible for the expulsion of his uncle, the Roman king Tarquinius Superbus after the rape and suicide of Lucretia, in the traditional accounts it is he who led the overthrow of the Roman monarchy. He was then involved in securing the abdication of fellow consul Tarquinius Collatinus, and the suppression of a plot to restore the Tarquinian monarchy.

He was claimed as an ancestor of the Roman gens Junia, including Decimus Junius Brutus and Marcus Junius Brutus, the most infamous of Julius Caesar's assassins. Traditions about his life may have been fictional, and some scholars argue that it was the Etruscan king Porsenna who overthrew Tarquinius. The plebeian status of the Junia gens has also raised doubts about his position as a consul and the alleged initial patrician domination of the office. Depicted as the nephew of Tarquinius, he may have symbolized the internal tensions that occurred during the transition between the monarchy and the republic.

== Background and historicity ==
Prior to the establishment of the Roman Republic, Rome had been ruled by kings.

The account is from Livy's Ab urbe condita and deals with a point in the history of Rome prior to reliable historical records (virtually all prior records were destroyed by the Gauls when they sacked Rome under Brennus in 390 or 387 BC).

Modern historians have challenged almost every part of the traditional story from Livy:

Some of the leading dramatis personae – Lucretia, Brutus, Valerius Publicola, even Lars Porsenna – have been dismissed as figments of pure legend. The chronology has been challenged, with many scholars rejecting the traditional sixth-century date in favour of a later one – around 470 BC, or even after 450. Others have suggested that the transition from monarchy to republic was not a sudden revolution, but rather a gradual process lasting many years, perhaps even centuries... before the consular system of the classical Republic was at last established. Finally, it is widely supposed in modern books that the end of the Roman monarchy marked the end of a period of Etruscan rule in Rome, and the liberation of the city from a period of foreign occupation. In its strongest form this theory maintains that the fall of Tarquin was only a minor symptom of a much wider phenomenon, namely the decline of Etruscan power and the fall of an Etruscan empire in central Italy.

== Overthrow of the monarchy ==
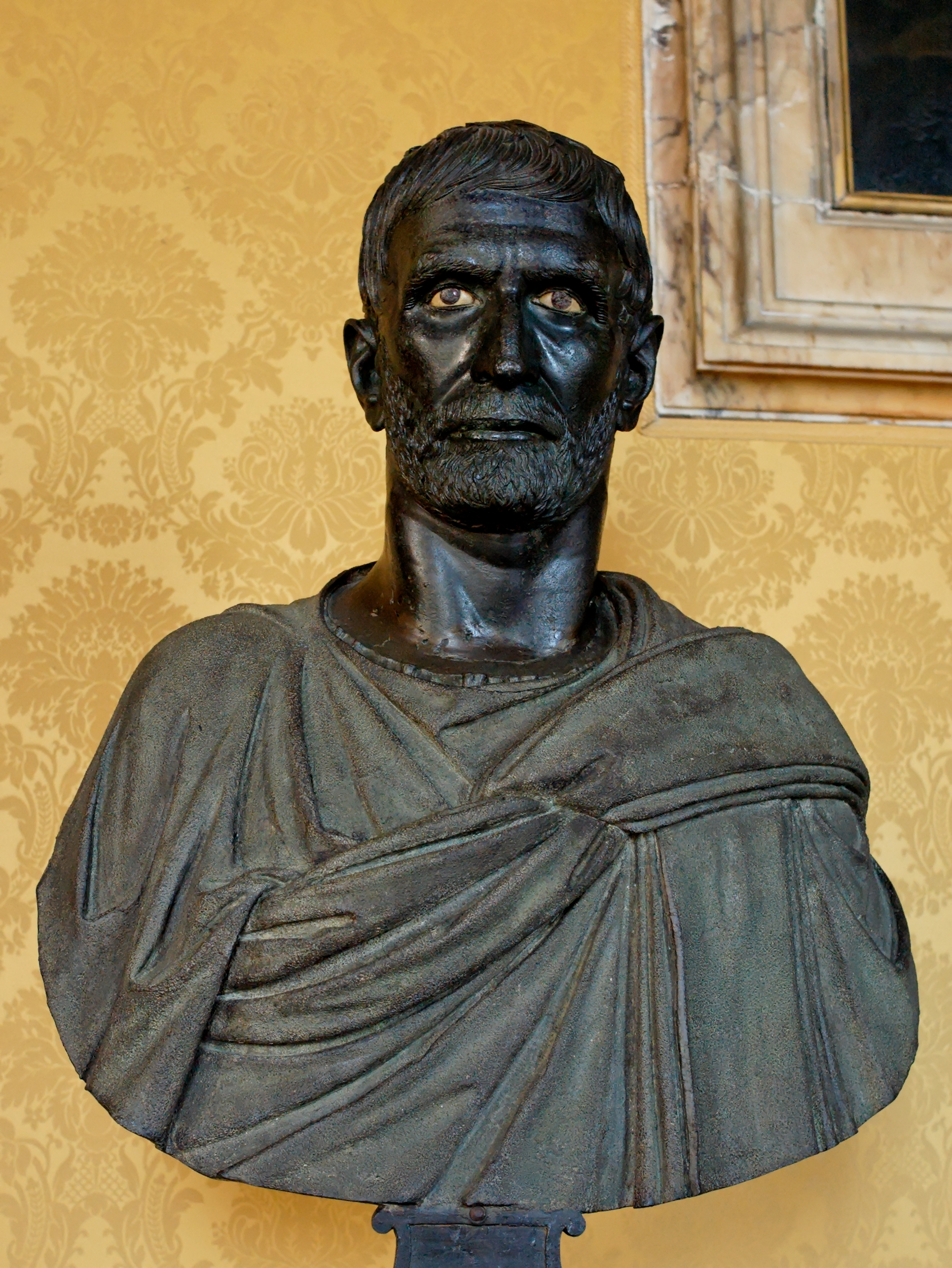
The Capitoline Brutus (now in the Capitoline Museums) is a bronze bust dated 4th to early 3rd centuries BC. It was initially thought to be a bust of Lucius Brutus (hence its name), but modern scholars have rejected this attribution.

According to Roman tradition, Brutus led the revolt that overthrew the last king, Lucius Tarquinius Superbus. The coup was prompted by the rape of the noblewoman Lucretia by a son of the king, Sextus Tarquinius; Brutus was joined in this plotting by among others, Lucretia's father, Spurius Lucretius Tricipitinus and Publius Valerius Poplicola.

Brutus was the son of Tarquinia, daughter of Rome's fifth king Lucius Tarquinius Priscus and sister to Rome's seventh king Tarquinius Superbus.

According to Livy, Brutus had a number of grievances against his uncle the king. Amongst them was that Tarquinius had put to death a number of the chief men of Rome, including Brutus' brother. Brutus avoided the distrust of Tarquinius's family by feigning that he was slow-witted (in Latin brutus translates to dullard).

He accompanied Tarquinius's sons on a trip to the Oracle of Delphi. The sons asked the oracle which of them was going to be Rome's next king. The Oracle of Delphi responded that the first among them to kiss their mother "shall hold supreme sway in Rome." Brutus interpreted "mother" to mean Gaia, so he pretended to trip and kissed the ground.

Brutus, along with Spurius Lucretius Tricipitinus, Publius Valerius Poplicola, and Lucius Tarquinius Collatinus were summoned by Lucretia to Collatia after she had been raped by Sextus Tarquinius, the son of the king Tarquinius Superbus. Lucretia, believing that the rape dishonoured her and her family, committed suicide by stabbing herself with a dagger after telling of what had befallen her. According to legend, Brutus grabbed the dagger from Lucretia's breast after her death and immediately shouted for the overthrow of the Tarquins.

The four men gathered the youth of Collatia, then went to Rome where Brutus summoned the people to the forum and exhorted them to rise up against the king. Later accounts, like that in Livy, assert that Brutus was at the time one of the cavalry officers – tribunus celerum. This is likely an insertion for constitutional propriety; Cicero indicates instead that he was a private citizen. The people voted for the deposition of the king, and the banishment of the royal family.

The leaders of the revolt were close relatives of the king: Brutus was the king's nephew and Lucius Tarquinius Collatinus was king's cousin. The king, who was conducting a war near and camped at Ardea, rushed to Rome on news of the coup, but found the city barred; at the same time, the coup leaders won over the army and then expelled the king's sons. Tarquinius Superbus fled with his family into exile.

In the aftermath following the overthrow Brutus is credited by later historians such as Tacitus as "establishing liberty and the consulate".

=== Oath of Brutus ===
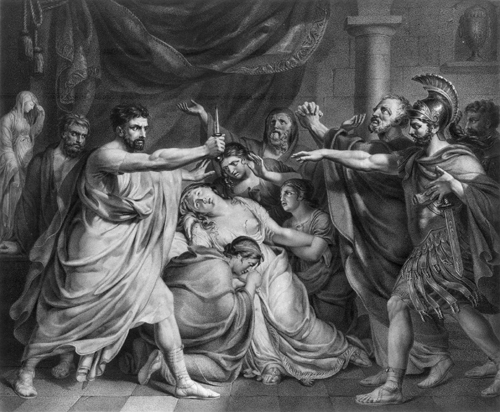
"The oath of Brutus" by François-Joseph Navez

According to Livy, Brutus' first act after the expulsion of Lucius Tarquinius Superbus was to bring the people to swear an oath never to allow any man again to be king in Rome.

Omnium primum avidum novae libertatis populum, ne postmodum flecti precibus aut donis regiis posset, iure iurando adegit neminem Romae passuros regnare.

His first act was to secure the people, who were now jealous of their newly-recovered liberty, from being influenced by any entreaties or bribes from the king. He therefore made them take an oath that they would not suffer any man to reign in Rome.

By swearing an oath that they would suffer no man to rule Rome, it forced the people, desirous of a new liberty, not to be thereafter swayed by the entreaties or bribes of kings. This is, fundamentally, a restatement of the 'private oath' sworn by the conspirators to overthrow the monarchy:

Per hunc... castissimum ante regiam iniuriam sanguinem iuro, vosque, di, testes facio me L. Tarquinium Superbum cum scelerata coniuge et omni liberorum stirpe ferro igni quacumque dehinc vi possim exsecuturum, nec illos nec alium quemquam regnare Romae passurum.

By this guiltless blood before the kingly injustice I swear – you and the gods as my witnesses – I make myself the one who will prosecute, by what force I am able, Lucius Tarquinius Superbus along with his wicked wife and the whole house of his freeborn children by sword, by fire, by any means hence, so that neither they nor any one else be suffered to rule Rome.

There is no scholarly agreement that the oath took place; it is reported, although differently, by Plutarch and Appian. Nevertheless, the spirit of the oath inspired later Romans including his descendant Marcus Junius Brutus.

== Consulship and death ==
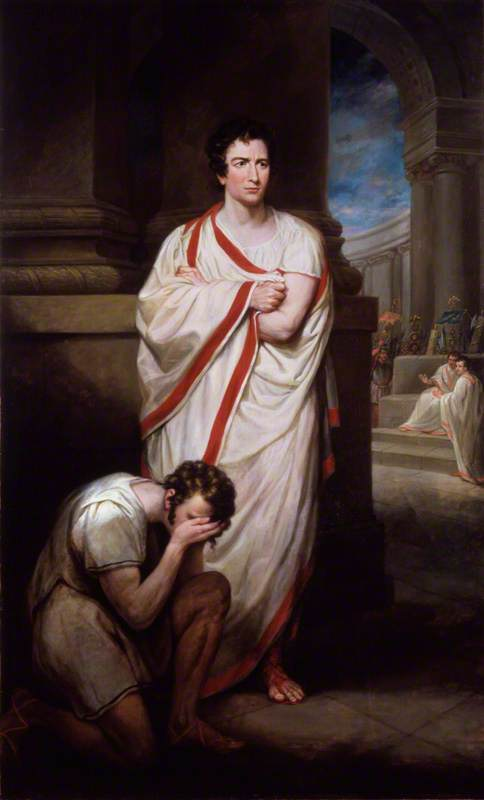
Edmund Kean as Brutus by James Northcote, 1819

Brutus and Lucretia's bereaved husband, Lucius Tarquinius Collatinus, were elected as the first consuls of Rome (509 BC Varronian). Tradition says that this election was conducted by Spurius Lucretius Tricipitinus, whom Brutus had appointed as interrex in his position as tribunus celerum. Brutus' first acts during his consulship, according to Livy, included administering an oath to the people of Rome to never again accept a king in Rome (see above) and replenishing the number of senators to 300 from the principal men of the equites.

Latter-day Romans attributed many institutions to Brutus, including:

- the taking of auspices before entering office,
- use of the curiate assembly to bestow consular imperium,
- alternation of fasces between the consuls (also attributed to others),
- expansion of the senate in adding the minores gentes, and
- dedication of a temple to Carna on the Coelian hill.

The new consuls also created a new office of rex sacrorum to carry out the religious duties that had previously been performed by the kings.

During his consulship the royal family made an attempt to regain the throne, firstly by their ambassadors seeking to subvert a number of the leading Roman citizens in the Tarquinian conspiracy. Amongst the conspirators were two brothers of Brutus' wife, Vitellia, and Brutus' two sons: Titus Junius Brutus and Tiberius Junius Brutus. The conspiracy was discovered (Note: The conspiracy was reported to Brutus by his slave Vindex, who was freed in reward. This event was commemorated annually at the inauguration of new consuls for centuries to come, by the emancipation of a slave chosen for this purpose.) and the consuls determined to punish the conspirators with death. Brutus gained respect for his stoicism in watching the execution of his own sons, even though he showed emotion during the punishment. Following this, he either forced his co-consul Collatinus to resign or otherwise had him removed – either because of enmity to his relationship to the Tarquins or due to his lack of harshness in punishing the conspirators – and then presided over the election of a suffect consul, Publius Valerius Poplicola.

Tarquinius again sought to retake the throne soon after at the Battle of Silva Arsia, leading the forces of Tarquinii and Veii against the Roman army. Valerius led the infantry, and Brutus led the cavalry. Arruns Tarquinius, the king's son, led the Etruscan cavalry. The cavalry joined the battle and Arruns, having spied from afar the lictors, and thereby recognising the presence of a consul, soon saw that Brutus was in command of the cavalry. The two men, who were cousins, charged each other, and speared each other to death. The infantry also soon joined the battle, the result being in doubt for some time. The right wing of each army was victorious, the army of Tarquinii forcing back the Romans, and the Veientes being routed. However the Etruscan forces eventually fled the field, the Romans claiming the victory.

Some time during his consulship, he is supposed to have signed a treaty with Carthage and dedicated the Capitoline temple, reported in Polybius. This, along with the unanimous reporting of Roman sources, is the main evidence of his historicity.

The surviving consul, Valerius, after celebrating a triumph for the victory, held a funeral for Brutus with much magnificence. The Roman noblewomen mourned him for one year, for his vengeance of Lucretia's violation.

== Brutus in literature and art ==
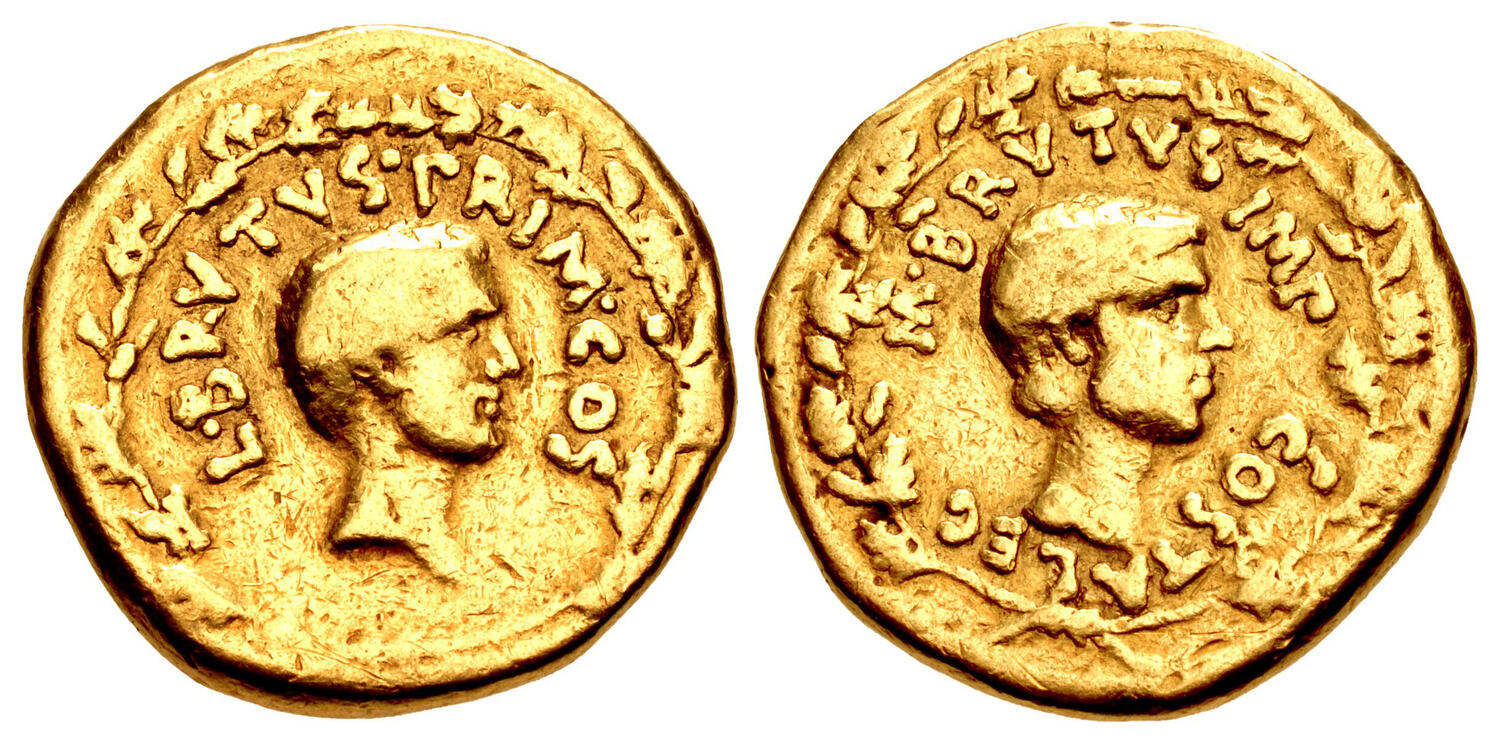
Aureus of Marcus Junius Brutus, c.43–42 BC. The obverse shows the portrait of Lucius Junius Brutus, with the legend PRIM COS ("first consul").

The politician of the late republic Marcus Junius Brutus claimed descent from Lucius Junius Brutus. He minted coins featuring his portrait on two occasions: first on a denarius while triumvir monetalis in 54, then on a gold aureus in the final months of the Liberators' civil war in 42 BC.

A reference to Lucius Junius Brutus is in the following lines from Shakespeare's play The Tragedie of Julius Cæsar, (Cassius to Marcus Brutus, Act 1, Scene 2).

"O, you and I have heard our fathers say,
There was a Brutus once that would have brookt
Th'eternal devil to keep his state in Rome
As easily as a king."

One of the main charges of the senatorial faction that plotted against Julius Caesar after he had the Roman Senate declare him dictator for life, was that he was attempting to make himself a king, and a co-conspirator Cassius, enticed Brutus' direct descendant, Marcus Junius Brutus, to join the conspiracy by referring to his ancestor.

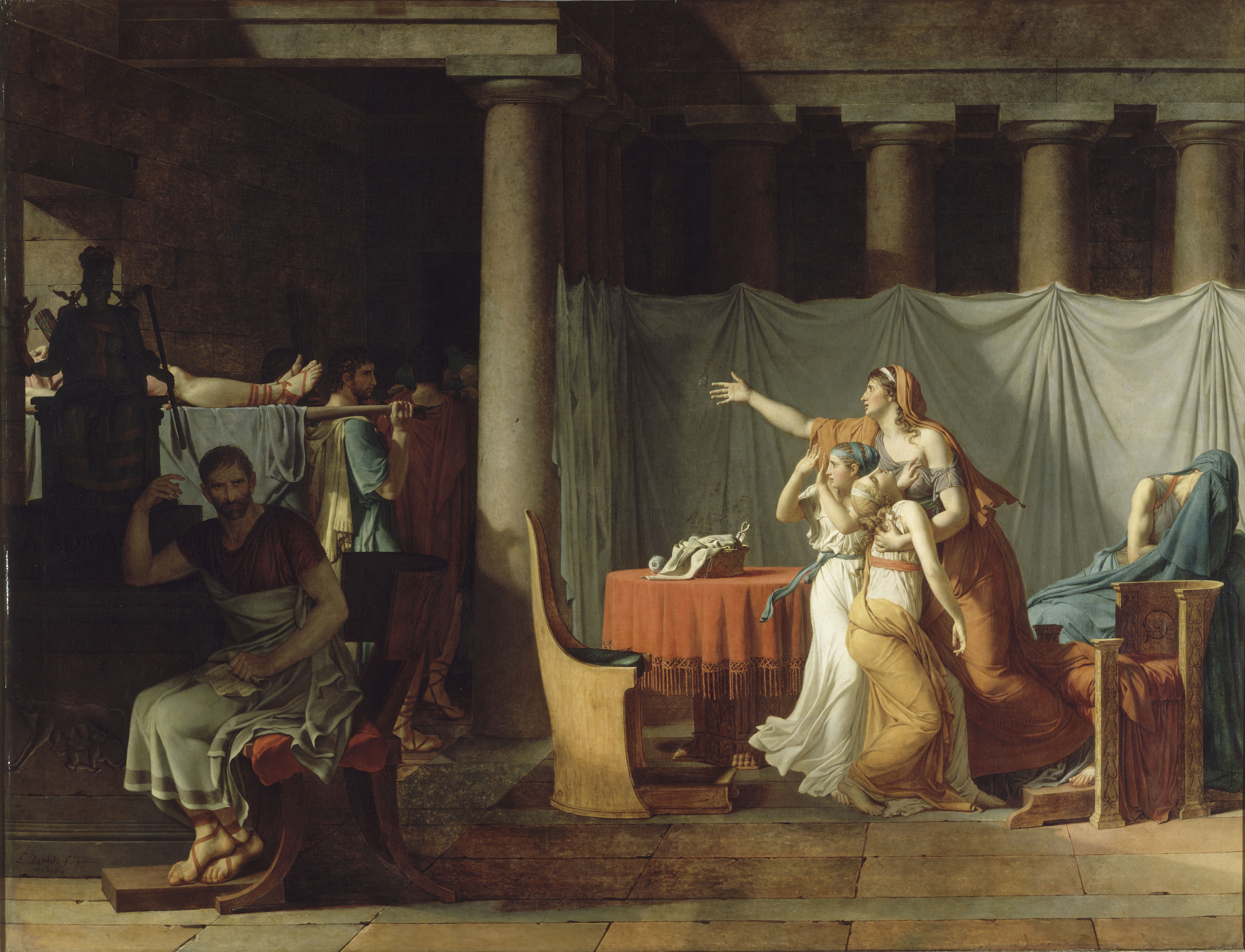
The Lictors Bring to Brutus the Bodies of His Sons by David, 1789

Lucius Junius Brutus is a leading character in Shakespeare's Rape of Lucrece, in Benjamin Britten's opera The Rape of Lucretia based on André Obey's play Le Viol de Lucrèce, and in Nathaniel Lee's Restoration tragedy, Lucius Junius Brutus; Father of his Country. Before the Glorious Revolution, Nathaniel Lee's Lucius Junius Brutus was banned in December of 1680 for portraying the Whig cause (Protestantism, no royal prerogatives, encouragement to trade and industry, empire) as Roman republicanism.

Lucius Junius Brutus (referred to simply as "Brutus") is discussed briefly in Søren Kierkegaard's work, Fear and Trembling. There, Brutus serves as an example of what Kierkegaard calls "tragic heroism." Alongside the examples of Agamemnon and Jephthah, the tragic heroism of Brutus is presented in stark contrast to the faith of the Biblical figure, Abraham.

In The Mikado, the protagonist Nanki-poo refers to his father the Emperor as "the Lucius Junius Brutus of his race", for being willing to enforce his own law even if it means killing his son.

The memory of Brutus also had a profound impact on Italian patriots, including those who established the ill-fated short-lived Roman Republic in February 1849.

Brutus was a hero of republicanism during the Enlightenment and Neoclassical periods. In 1789, at the dawn of the French Revolution, master painter Jacques-Louis David publicly exhibited his politically charged master-work, The Lictors Bring to Brutus the Bodies of His Sons, to great controversy. David's contemporary, Guillaume Guillon-Lethière depicted the scene of Brutus' sons' executions in grand style in his work Brutus Condemning His Sons to Death (1788).

== See also ==
- Junia gens
- Junius

== Footnote ==
Political offices
Preceded by None (Lucius Tarquinius Superbus as King of Rome)	Roman consul 509 BC; With: Lucius Tarquinius Collatinus; Publius Valerius Poplicola (suffect)	Succeeded by Spurius Lucretius Tricipitinus (suffect)
