= Battle of Silva Arsia =

Part of the Roman–Etruscan Wars (509 BC)

- Part of the Roman–Etruscan Wars
Date	c. 509 BC
Location	maybe near the Silva Arsia, which was maybe a forest nearby Rome?
Result	Roman victory; Defeat of monarchist forces and maintenance of Republican government.

Belligerents
Roman Republic	Tarquinii; Veii

Commanders and leaders
Lucius Junius Brutus †; Publius Valerius Publicola	Lucius Tarquinius Superbus; Arruns Tarquinius †

The Battle of Silva Arsia was a battle in 509 BC between the republican forces of ancient Rome and Etruscan forces of Tarquinii and Veii led by the deposed Roman king Lucius Tarquinius Superbus ("Tarquin the Proud"). It resulted in victory to the nascent Roman Republic.

Everything that is known of this battle is from the Roman historian Livy, writing centuries after the event around 27–25 BC. The stories of the Tarquin dynasty and the founding of the Roman Republic are legendary to a large degree, and it is unknown how closely traditions of the 1st-century BC era matched the actual history. Book 2 of The History of Rome recounts beliefs about how Tarquin the Proud was expelled and his attempts to return with an allied army of Etruscans. Livy also includes a duel to the death fought between Roman consul Lucius Junius Brutus and Tarquin's son Aruns, in which both died spearing the other. He does not say where precisely the battle took place, but does say that the Roman god Silvanus made a prophecy of Roman victory in the Silva Arsia (Arsian forest), a place of unknown location but presumably on the border of Rome's territory and Veii's territory.

The battle was one of a number of attempts by Tarquin to regain the throne. It can also be seen as part of the Roman-Etruscan Wars, a series of conflicts between the Etruscan cities and the expanding Roman state.

== Background ==
In 509 BC, the Roman monarchy was overthrown and the Roman Republic was established with the election of the first consuls. The deposed king, Lucius Tarquinius Superbus, whose family originated from Tarquinii in Etruria, garnered the support of the Etruscan cities of Veii and Tarquinii, recalling to the former their regular losses of war and of land to the Roman state, and to the latter his family ties.

== Battle ==
The armies of the two cities followed Tarquin to battle, and the Roman consuls led the Roman army to meet them, with Publius Valerius commanding the Roman infantry and Lucius Junius Brutus the equites. Similarly, the king commanded the Etruscan infantry, and his son Aruns had command of the cavalry.

The cavalry first joined battle and Aruns, having spied from afar the lictors, and thereby recognising the presence of a consul, soon saw that Brutus was in command of the cavalry. The two men, who were cousins, charged each other, and speared each other to death. The infantry also soon joined the battle, the result being in doubt for some time. The right wing of each army was victorious, the army of Tarquinii forcing back the Romans, and the Veientes being routed. However the Etruscan forces eventually fled the field, the Romans claiming the victory. According to Plutarch the battle was said to have been fought on the last day of February.

== Aftermath ==
On the night after the battle, Livy reports that a voice believed to be the spirit of Silvanus was heard to come from the nearby forest, saying "more of the Etrurians by one had fallen in the battle; that the Roman was victorious in the war".

The consul Valerius collected the spoils of the routed Etruscans. He returned to Rome to celebrate a triumph which, according to the Fasti Triumphales, took place on 1 March 509 BC. The funeral of Brutus was carried out by Valerius with great magnificence.

Livy writes that later in 509 BC Valerius returned to fight the Veientes. It is unclear whether this was continuing from the Battle of Silva Arsia, or was some fresh dispute. It is also unclear what happened in this dispute.
