= Arruns Tarquinius (son of Tarquin the Proud) =

Son of Tarquin the Proud, slain by Lucius Junius Brutus

Arruns Tarquinius was one of the sons of Lucius Tarquinius Superbus, the last King of Rome. Ancient sources differ as to whether he was the second or third son. In the earliest accounts, passed through fragments of the first Roman historian, Fabius Pictor, he is the third son. According to Livy and Dionysius of Halicarnassus, he is the second son. Modern historians doubt the historicity of the specific actions attributed to Arruns and other members of his dynasty, regarding them as highly embellished by later accounts.

During his father's reign, he accompanied his elder brother, Titus, and their cousin, Lucius Junius Brutus, to consult the Oracle at Delphi regarding an omen witnessed by the king. After she had interpreted the omen, the princes asked the Oracle who should succeed their father as king; her reply was that he who should first kiss his mother upon their return would succeed the king. While Titus and Arruns assumed that this meant their actual mother, Brutus correctly intuited that mother earth was intended, and so deliberately stumbled and fell upon the trio's return to Italy.

Following the overthrow of the monarchy, traditionally dated to 509 BC, Titus and Arruns went with their father to Caere, while Brutus was elected one of the first consuls. After a reported unsuccessful attempt by the Tarquins to regain the throne, the Roman tradition places him with his father in command of the Etruscan cavalry at the Battle of Silva Arsia; after Arruns sighted his cousin Brutus, the two charged each other and were each speared to death. The battle ended in a Roman victory, and the Tarquins remained in exile.

== In literature ==
- In Inferno, the first part of the Divine Comedy of Dante Alighieri, Arruns appears in the fourth bolgia of the Eighth circle of hell, together with sorcerers, astrologers and false prophets.
