= Collatia =

Ancient town in central Italy

Coordinates: 41.9251°N 12.6666°E

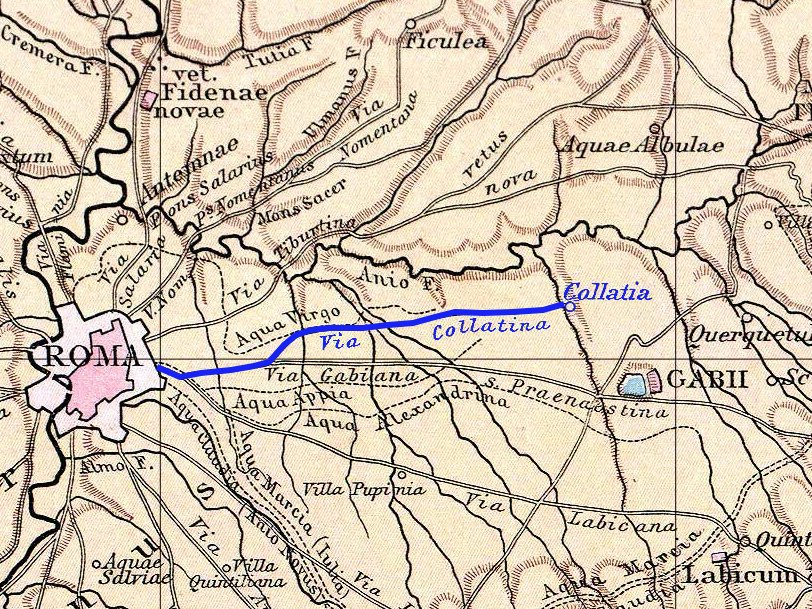
Via Collatina, from Rome to Collatia

Collatia was an ancient town of central Italy, c. 15 km northeast of Rome by the Via Collatina.

It appears in the legendary history of Rome as captured by King Tarquinius Priscus. Vergil speaks of it as a Latin colony of Alba Longa. In the time of Cicero it had lost all importance; Strabo names it as a mere village, in private hands, while for Pliny it was one of the lost cities of Latium.

According to Livy, it was taken, along with its population and surrounding land, from the Sabines by Tarquinius Priscus at the conclusion of his war against them. Livy records the wording of the form of the town's surrender. The date of Tarquinius' triumph over the Sabines, according to the Fasti Triumphales, which Livy says occurred shortly after the surrender of Collatia, is 13 September, 585 BC.

By 509 BC the town was governed by the Roman Lucius Tarquinius Collatinus, who took his name from the town. It was the site of the rape of Lucretia in that year, and Livy records that the leaders of the revolution which followed thereafter, gathered in Collatia to hear Lucretia's tale, then gathered the youth of Collatia to commence their revolution.

The site is undoubtedly to be sought on the hill now occupied by the large medieval fortified farmhouse of Castello di Lunghezza immediately to the south of the Anio, which occupies the site of the citadel joined by a narrow neck to the tableland to the southeast on which the city stood: this is protected by wide valleys on each side, and is isolated at the southeast end by a deep narrow valley enlarged by cutting.

No remains are to be seen, but the site is admirably adapted for an ancient settlement. The road may be traced leading to the south end of this tableland, being identical with the modern road to Lunghezza for the middle part of its course only. The earlier identification with Castellaccio, c. 3.5 km to the southeast, is untenable.

== See also ==
- Lucius Tarquinius Collatinus
