= Lucius Tarquinius Collatinus =

One of the first two consuls of the Roman Republic (509 BC)

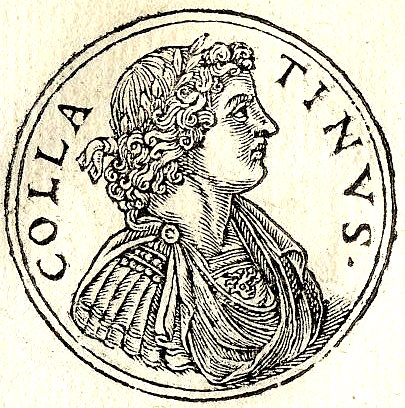
- Tarquinius Collatinus from Guillaume Rouillé's Promptuarii Iconum Insigniorum

Consul of the Roman Republic
- In office 509 – 509 BC Serving with Lucius Junius Brutus
- Preceded by: Position established
- Succeeded by: Publius Valerius Publicola (suffect)

Personal details
- Born: Unknown Roman Kingdom
- Died: unknown Italian Peninsula
- Spouse: Lucretia (d. 510 BC)
- Parent: Arruns Tarquinius (Egerius) (father)

Lucius Tarquinius Ar. f. Ar. n. Collatinus was one of the first two consuls of the Roman Republic in 509 BC, together with Lucius Junius Brutus. The two men had led the revolution which overthrew the Roman monarchy. He was forced to resign his office and go into exile as a result of the hatred he had helped engender in the people against the former ruling house.

== Background ==
According to Roman tradition, Collatinus was the son of Arruns Tarquinius, better known as Egerius, a nephew of Lucius Tarquinius Priscus, the fifth King of Rome. Through an accident, Arruns had been born into poverty, but when his uncle subdued the Latin town of Collatia, he was placed in command of the Roman garrison there. The surname Collatinus was derived from this town.

Collatinus married Lucretia, daughter of Spurius Lucretius Tricipitinus. According to legend, while Collatinus was away from home, his cousin, Sextus Tarquinius, son of the king, Lucius Tarquinius Superbus, came to his house by night. Forcing himself upon Lucretia, Sextus threatened to kill her, together with a slave, and tell her husband that he had caught her in the act of adultery with the slave, unless she should accede to his desire. After his departure, Lucretia sent for her husband and father, and recounted the events to them. Despite their entreaties and protests of her innocence, Lucretia then plunged a dagger into her breast in expiation of her shame.

== Revolution ==
Enraged by his cousin's deed, Collatinus and his father-in-law brought news of the crime before the people. They were supported by Brutus, the king's nephew, and others who had suffered various cruelties at the hands of the king and his sons. While the king was away on a campaign, the conspirators barred the gates of Rome and established a republican government, headed by two consuls, so that one man should not be master of Rome. Brutus and Collatinus were the first consuls, and set about the defense of the city.

Collatinus' ascendency was short-lived; although he himself had suffered at the hands of the king, and ushered in the Republic, he soon became the object of revulsion from those who would not abide any of the Tarquins in power at Rome. Collatinus was dumbstruck when Brutus, his colleague and cousin, called upon him to resign, but resisted until his father-in-law, Lucretius, added his voice to the chorus. Fearing what might become of him should he refuse the popular demand, Collatinus laid down the consulship and went into exile at Lanuvium.

Brutus, who as the king's nephew was even closer to the royal house, was spared the same indignity, as a part of the Junia gens; but he fell in battle the same year against the king's forces. Publius Valerius Poplicola was appointed consul suffectus in the place of Collatinus, and the elderly Spurius Lucretius in place of Brutus; but he died soon after, and Marcus Horatius Pulvillus became consul in his place, the fifth and final consul of the first year of the Republic.

== Sources ==
- Livy, i. 38, 57–60, ii. 2.
- Dionysius of Halicarnassus, iv. 64.
- Cassius Dio, Frag. 24.
- Cicero, De Republica, ii. 53, De Officiis, iii. 10.
- William Smith (1870). "Collatinus, L. Tarquinius". Dictionary of Greek and Roman Biography and Mythology. Vol. I. Boston: Little, Brown, and Company. p. 813..

Political offices
Preceded by New creation (Lucius Tarquinius Superbus as King of Rome)	Consul of the Roman Republic with Lucius Junius Brutus; 509 BC	Succeeded by Publius Valerius Publicola (suffect)
