= Cameria =

Ancient city in Italy

Cameria or Camerium was an ancient city of Latium, which according to tradition was conquered by Rome in the time of the Kings, and destroyed following a revolt against Roman authority in 502 BC. Its inhabitants were known as Camerini.

== History ==
Cameria was one of the most ancient cities of Latium, having been established as a colony of Alba Longa, long before the founding of Rome. Diodorus Siculus attributes its foundation to Latinus Silvius, one of the Alban kings. It was numbered among the Prisci Latini, the old Latin towns whose inhabitants were regarded as aborigines; that is, those who had lived there ab origine, "from the beginning". It is uncertain whether its name is connected with that of Camers, the name of two mythological personages alluded to by Virgil. The location of Cameria is no longer known with certainty, but the most likely candidate for its modern location is the town of Palombara Sabina, built on a hill near the foot of Monte Gennaro.

=== Conquest by Romulus ===
Dionysius of Halicarnassus relates that in the early years of the Roman Kingdom, the Camerini came into conflict with the Romans led by Romulus, the legendary founder and first King of Rome, and Titus Tatius, the leader of the Sabine population at Rome, who ruled alongside Romulus for five years. According to Dionysius, the expedition against the Camerini was the only military venture undertaken by the two kings during what was otherwise a peaceful period in Rome's early history.

Roman territory was regularly raided by parties from Cameria, and the city ignored repeated Roman demands to stop the "robbers", or otherwise redress the injury done to Roman property. Romulus and Tatius marched on Cameria, defeating the Camerini in a pitched battle, and then laying siege to the town, which they took by storm. The Camerini were disarmed, and a third of their territory was seized by Rome and allocated to its people, who began to settle in the former Camerian territory.

The Camerini then began harassing the Roman settlers, hoping to drive them from the captured land. Romulus and Tatius marched against the Camerini a second time, quickly scattering their men, and seizing the town's remaining territory. A Roman colony was sent to Cameria, but about four thousand Camerini were invited to settle at Rome, where they were divided among the thirty curiae. At some point following the death of Tatius, the Camerini took advantage of a pestilence at Rome by attacking the colonists, killing some and driving out the rest. Romulus retook the city, along with half of its remaining territory, and placed a garrison there to forestall future revolts.

=== Later history ===
According to Livy, Cameria was one of the Prisci Latini taken by Tarquin the Elder, the fifth King of Rome, during his final campaign, along with Corniculum, Ficulea, Crustumerium, Ameriola, Medullia, and Nomentum. Dionysius relates that Cameria submitted to Tarquin after receiving favourable terms, indicating that the city had regained its independence since its earlier conquest.

Following the expulsion of Tarquin the Proud, the seventh and last Roman King, in 509 BC, Cameria was one of the towns which rallied to the banners of Octavius Mamilius, the dictator of Tusculum, and Tarquin's son-in-law. Mamilius led a coalition of Latin cities in an attempt to restore Tarquin to the throne, in concert with the Etruscan king Lars Porsena of Clusium. Mamilius marched to Porsena's aid at the head of an army composed of Tusculans, Camerini, and Antemnates, but his forces were prevented from entering the city following the destruction of the Sublician Bridge, and instead ravaged the Roman countryside.

In 504 BC, Cameria was one of two Latin cities, together with Fidenae, which joined the Sabines in making war upon Rome. The Sabines and their allies were defeated, and Fidenae taken by storm, but the Sabines and Camerini resumed hostilities the following year. In 502, the consul Opiter Verginius Tricostus undertook the war with Cameria, marching his forces to the city under cover of darkness, and mounting a surprise attack at dawn. Thrown into confusion, the Camerini could not resolve upon resistance or capitulation, and the city was swiftly taken. Verginius allowed the plunder of the city, executed the leaders responsible for undertaking war against Rome, razed the city, and sold the survivors into slavery.

The last mention of Cameria in Roman history occurs in 501, when a group of Camerian exiles, together with exiles from Fidenae, joined Octavius Mamilius in urging the Latin League to make war upon Rome. Dionysius does not mention Cameria among the cities of the Latin League that joined with Mamilius and Tarquin in 498. (Note: The Latin League traditionally consisted of thirty towns; omitting Cameria, Dionysius lists precisely twenty-nine in 498.) Pliny the Elder includes Cameria in a list of Latin cities that no longer existed by the first century.

== Legacy ==
The surname Camerinus was borne by the oldest family of the Sulpicia gens, one of the most illustrious patrician families of ancient Rome, and probably indicated that the Sulpicii originated at Cameria. Members of this family frequently held the highest offices of the Roman state from the earliest years of the Republic until the second century AD, and the name occurs to the end of Roman history. Tacitus reports that the Coruncanii were also from Cameria.

== Bibliography ==
- Diodorus Siculus, Bibliotheca Historica (Library of History).
- Dionysius of Halicarnassus, Romaike Archaiologia (Roman Antiquities).
- Titus Livius (Livy), History of Rome.
- Publius Vergilius Maro (Vergil), Aeneid.
- Gaius Plinius Secundus (Pliny the Elder), Historia Naturalis (Natural History).
- Publius Cornelius Tacitus, Annales.
- Sextus Aurelius Victor (attributed), De Origo Gentis Romanae (On the Origin of the Roman People).
- Dictionary of Greek and Roman Biography and Mythology, William Smith, ed., Little, Brown and Company, Boston (1849).
- Dictionary of Greek and Roman Geography, William Smith, ed., Little, Brown and Company, Boston (1854).
