= Arruns Tarquinius (brother of Tarquin the Proud) =

Brother of Rome's last king, Lucius Tarquinius Superbus

Arruns Tarquinius was the brother of Lucius Tarquinius Superbus, the seventh and last King of Rome.

== Family and origins ==
According to most ancient authors, Arruns and his brother were the sons of Lucius Tarquinius Priscus, the fifth Roman king, and Tanaquil. However, in some sources they are described as grandsons; their father may have been a certain Gnaeus Tarquinius, who according to an Etruscan tradition was defeated and killed by the heroes Aulus and Caelius Vibenna, together with a certain Macstarna. Apparently the Etruscan equivalent of the Latin word magister, Macstarna has been identified with Servius Tullius, the sixth King of Rome.

== Servius Tullius and the Tarquins ==
According to legend, Servius had come to the palace as a child, following the capture of Corniculum by Tarquinius Priscus. Tanaquil, who was skilled in prophecy, discovered his potential for greatness by various omens. When the elder Tarquin was assassinated, Tanaquil gave out that he was merely wounded, and installed Servius as regent, preferring him to her own sons. The Etruscan tradition may preserve an account of a revolt by Tarquin's sons against Servius' magistracy. Servius married a daughter of the elder Tarquin, and in turn he gave his own daughters to Arruns and Lucius Tarquinius.

== Murder and aftermath ==
Arruns Tarquinius was mild and unassuming, while his brother was ambitious. Arruns' wife, known to history as Tullia Minor, as she was the younger daughter, was similarly ambitious, while her elder sister was not. Tullia sought to place her husband on the throne, which would require her father's death. But as Arruns lacked the ambition to overthrow his father-in-law, Tullia contrived his murder, and that of her own sister, that she might marry Lucius. Once these deeds were accomplished, she and Lucius plotted her father's destruction.

In a palace coup, the pair deposed and murdered the king, and Lucius seized the throne. Lucius' second son was named after his murdered brother; but it was the pride and arrogance of Lucius' sons that brought about the downfall of the Roman monarchy. The younger Arruns fell in battle against the consul Lucius Junius Brutus in 509 BC.

== Bibliography ==
=== Ancient sources ===
- Marcus Tullius Cicero, De Republica.
- Titus Livius (Livy), History of Rome.
- Dionysius of Halicarnassus, Romaike Archaiologia (Roman Antiquities).
- Lucius Mestrius Plutarchus (Plutarch), Lives of the Noble Greeks and Romans (Parallel Lives).

=== Modern sources ===
- Timothy J. Cornell, The Beginnings of Rome: Italy and Rome from the Bronze Age to the Punic Wars (c. 1000–264 BC), Routledge, London (1995).
- Dictionary of Greek and Roman Biography and Mythology, William Smith, ed., Little, Brown and Company, Boston (1849).
