= Vibenna =

Vibenna is a surname. Notable people with the surname include:

- Aulus Vibenna, Etruscan nobleman
- Caelius Vibenna, Etruscan nobleman
