= Lucius Tarquinius Superbus =

Seventh and last king of Rome

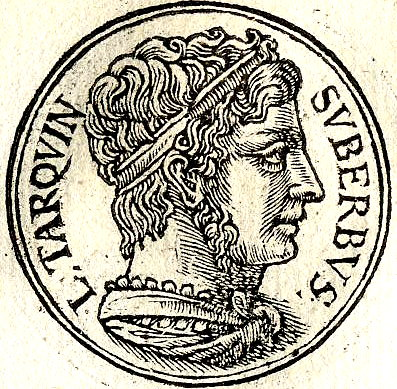
- Portrait from Promptuarium Iconum Insigniorum (1553) by Guillaume Rouillé

King of Rome
- Reign: 534–509 BC
- Predecessor: Servius Tullius
- Successor: Lucius Junius Brutus, Lucius Tarquinius Collatinus as Consuls
- Born: Rome
- Died: 495 BC; Cumae
- Spouse: Tullia Major; Tullia Minor
- Issue: Titus Tarquinius; Arruns Tarquinius; Sextus Tarquinius
- Father: Lucius Tarquinius Priscus (possibly grandfather)
- Mother: Tanaquil

Lucius Tarquinius Superbus (died 495 BC) was the legendary seventh and final king of Rome, reigning 25 years until the popular uprising that led to the establishment of the Roman Republic. He is commonly known as Tarquin the Proud, from his cognomen Superbus (Latin for "proud, arrogant, lofty").

Ancient accounts of the regal period mingle history and legend. Tarquin was said to have been either the son or grandson of Lucius Tarquinius Priscus, the fifth king of Rome, and to have gained the throne through the murders of both his wife and his elder brother, followed by the assassination of his predecessor, Servius Tullius. His reign has been described as a tyranny that justified the abolition of the monarchy.

== Background ==
The most ancient sources, such as that of Quintus Fabius Pictor, assert Tarquin was the son of Tarquinius Priscus, but modern historians believe that to be impossible under the traditional chronology, indicating either that he was Priscus' grandson or that the traditional chronology itself is unsound.

His mother supposedly was Tanaquil. Tanaquil had engineered her husband's succession to the Roman kingdom on the death of Ancus Marcius. When the sons of Marcius subsequently arranged the elder Tarquin's assassination in 579 BC, Tanaquil placed Servius Tullius on the throne, in preference to her own sons or grandsons.

According to an Etruscan tradition, the hero Macstarna, usually equated with Servius Tullius, defeated and killed a Roman named Gnaeus Tarquinius, and rescued the brothers Caelius and Aulus Vibenna from captivity. This may recollect an otherwise forgotten attempt by the sons of Tarquin the Elder to reclaim the throne.

To forestall further dynastic strife, Servius married his daughters, known to history as Tullia Major and Tullia Minor, to Lucius Tarquinius Superbus, the future king, and his brother Arruns. One of Tarquin's sisters, Tarquinia, married Marcus Junius Brutus, and was the mother of Lucius Junius Brutus, one of the men who would later lead the overthrow of the Roman Kingdom.

The elder sister, Tullia Major, was of mild disposition, yet married the ambitious Tarquin. Her younger sister, Tullia Minor, was of fiercer temperament, but her husband Arruns was not. She came to despise him, and conspired with Tarquin to bring about the deaths of Tullia Major and Arruns. After the murder of their spouses, Tarquin and Tullia were married. They had three sons: Titus, Arruns and Sextus, and a daughter, Tarquinia, who married Octavius Mamilius, the prince of Tusculum.

== Overthrow of Servius Tullius ==
Tullia encouraged her husband to advance his own position, ultimately persuading him to usurp her father, King Servius. Tarquin solicited the support of the patrician senators, especially those from houses that had been raised to senatorial rank under Tarquin the Elder. He bestowed presents upon them, and spread criticism of Servius the king.

In time, Tarquin felt ready to seize the throne. He went to the senate house with a group of armed men, seated himself on the throne, and summoned the senators to attend upon him. He then spoke to the senators, denigrating Servius as a slave born of a slave; for failing to be elected by the senate and the people during an interregnum, as had been the tradition for the election of kings of Rome; for having become king through the machinations of a woman; for favouring the lower classes of Rome over the wealthy, and for taking the land of the upper classes for distribution to the poor; and for instituting the census so that the wealth of the upper classes might be exposed in order to excite popular envy.

When word of this brazen deed reached Servius, he hurried to the curia to confront Tarquin, who levelled the same accusations against his father-in-law, and then in his youth and vigour carried the king outside and flung him down the steps of the senate house and into the street. The king's retainers fled, and as he made his way towards the palace, the aged Servius was set upon and murdered by Tarquin's assassins, perhaps on the advice of his own daughter.

Tullia drove in her chariot to the senate house, where she was the first to hail her husband as king. But Tarquin bade her return home, concerned that the crowd might do her violence. As she drove toward the Urbian Hill, her driver stopped suddenly, horrified at the sight of the king's body lying in the street. But in a frenzy, Tullia herself seized the reins, and drove the wheels of her chariot over her father's corpse. The king's blood spattered against the chariot and stained Tullia's clothes, so that she brought a gruesome relic of the murder back to her house. The street where Tullia disgraced the dead king afterwards became known as the Vicus Sceleratus, the Street of Crime.

== Reign ==
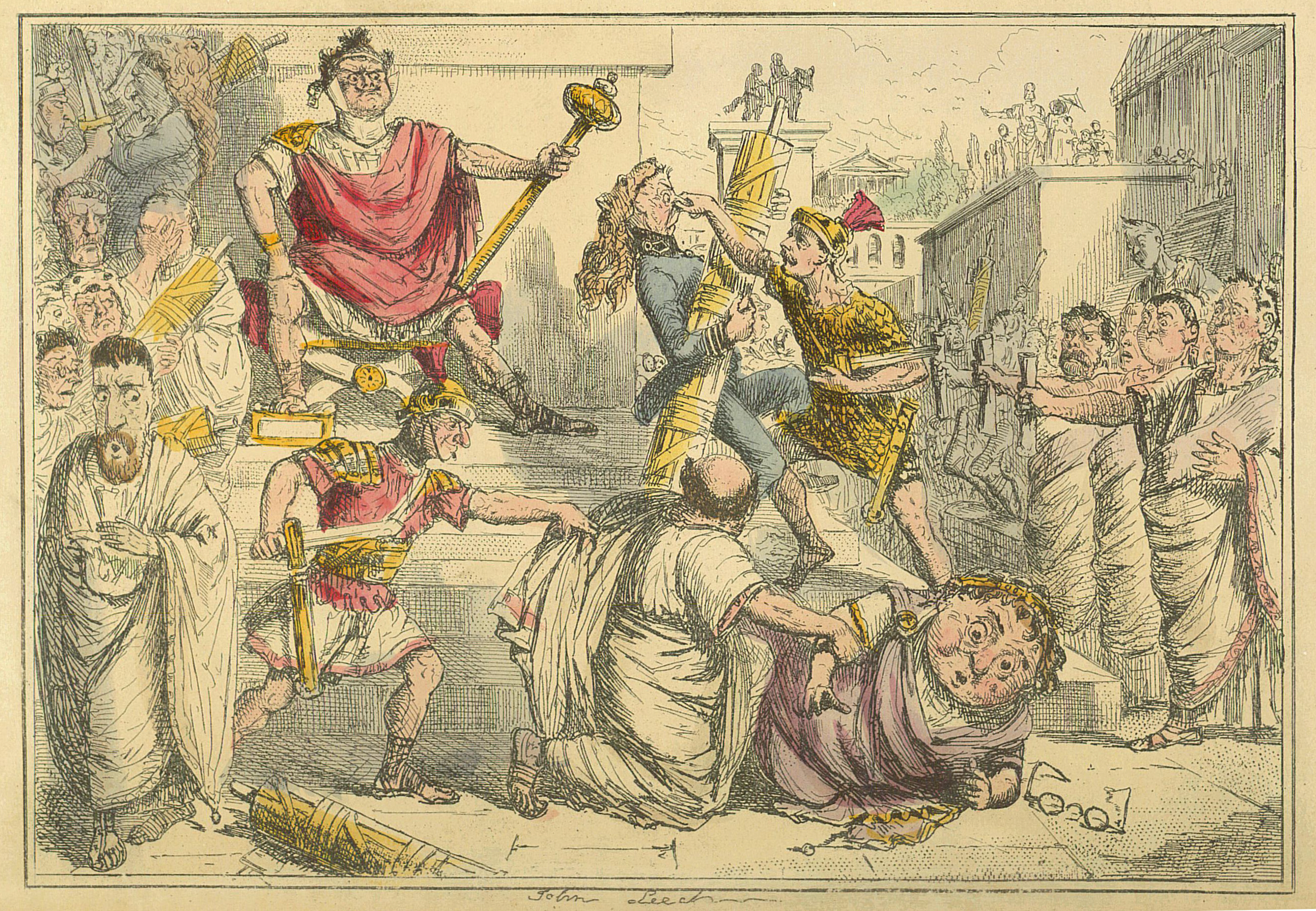
Tarquinius Superbus makes himself King; from The Comic History of Rome by Gilbert Abbott à Beckett (c. 1850s)

Tarquin commenced his reign by refusing to bury the dead Servius, and then putting to death several leading senators, whom he suspected of remaining loyal to Servius. By not replacing the slain senators, and not consulting the senate on matters of government, he diminished both the size and the authority of the senate. In another break with tradition, Tarquin judged capital crimes without the advice of counsellors, causing fear among those who might think to oppose him. He made a powerful ally when he betrothed his daughter to Octavius Mamilius of Tusculum, among the most eminent of the Latin chiefs.

Early in his reign, Tarquin called a meeting of the Latin leaders to discuss the bonds between Rome and the Latin towns. The meeting was held at a grove sacred to the goddess Ferentina. At the meeting, Turnus Herdonius inveighed against Tarquin's arrogance, and warned his countrymen against trusting the Roman king. Tarquin then bribed Turnus' servant to store a large number of swords in his master's lodging. Tarquin called together the Latin leaders, and accused Turnus of plotting his assassination. The Latin leaders accompanied Tarquin to Turnus' lodging and, the swords then being discovered, the Latin's guilt was then speedily inferred. Turnus was condemned to be thrown into a pool of water in the grove with a wooden frame, or cratis, placed over his head, into which stones were thrown, drowning him. The meeting of the Latin chiefs then continued, and Tarquin persuaded them to renew their treaty with Rome, becoming her allies rather than her enemies. It was agreed that the soldiers of the Latins would attend at the grove on an appointed day, and form a united military force with the Roman army.

Next, Tarquin instigated a war against the Volsci, taking the wealthy town of Suessa Pometia. He celebrated a triumph, and with the spoils of this conquest, he commenced the erection of the Temple of Jupiter Optimus Maximus, which Tarquin the Elder had vowed. He then engaged in a war with Gabii, one of the Latin cities that had rejected the treaty with Rome. Unable to take the city by force of arms, Tarquin resorted to another stratagem. His son, Sextus, pretending to be ill-treated by his father, and covered with the bloody marks of stripes, fled to Gabii. The infatuated inhabitants entrusted him with the command of their troops, and when he had obtained the unlimited confidence of the citizens, he sent a messenger to his father to inquire how he should deliver the city into his hands. The king, who was walking in his garden when the messenger arrived, made no reply but kept striking off the heads of the tallest poppies with his stick. Sextus took the hint, and put to death, or banished on false charges, all the leading men of Gabii, after which he had no difficulty in compelling the city to submit.

Tarquin agreed upon a peace with the Aequi, and renewed the treaty of peace between Rome and the Etruscans. According to the Fasti Triumphales, he won a victory over the Sabines, and established Roman colonies at the towns of Signia and Circeii.

At Rome, Tarquin levelled the top of the Tarpeian Rock, overlooking the Forum, and removed a number of ancient Sabine shrines to make way for the Temple of Jupiter Optimus Maximus on the Capitoline Hill. He constructed tiers of seats in the circus, and ordered the excavation of Rome's great sewer, the cloaca maxima.

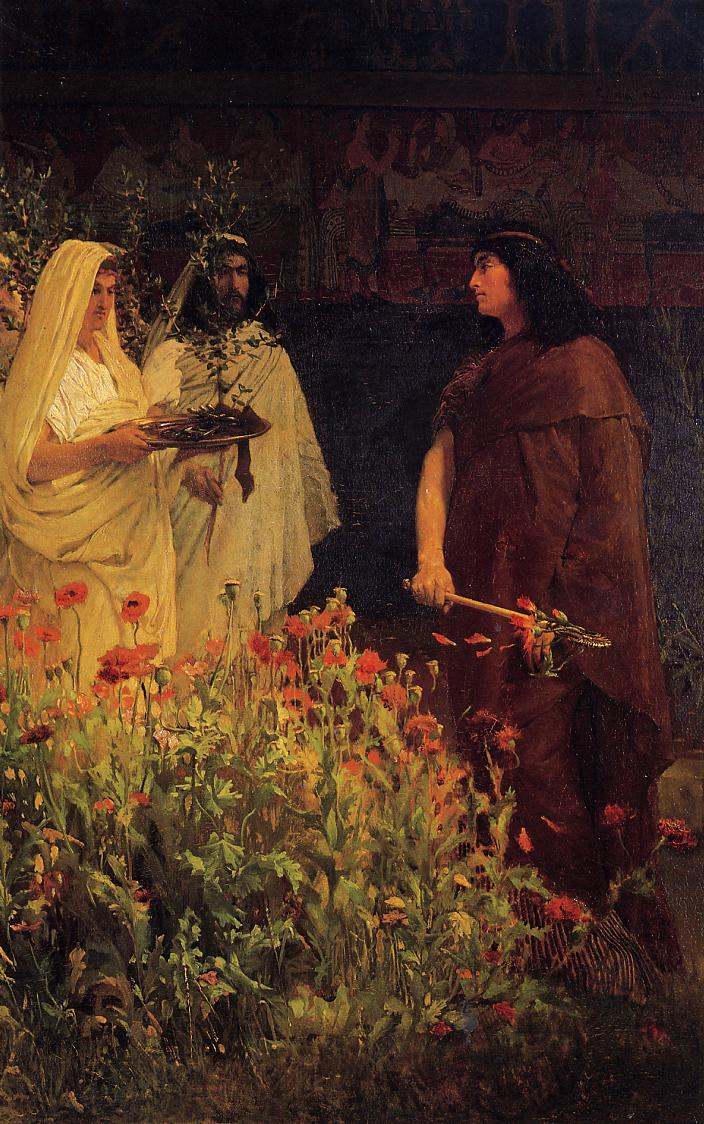
Tarquinius Superbus by Lawrence Alma-Tadema, depicting the king receiving a laurel; the poppies in the foreground refer to the "tall poppy" allegory

According to one story, Tarquin was approached by the Cumaean Sibyl, who offered him nine books of prophecy at an exorbitant price. Tarquin abruptly refused, and the Sibyl proceeded to burn three of the nine. She then offered him the remaining books, but at the same price. He hesitated, but refused again. The Sibyl then burned three more books before offering him the three remaining books at the original price. At last, Tarquin accepted, in this way obtaining the Sibylline Books.

== Overthrow and exile ==
In 509 BC, having angered the Roman populace through the pace and burden of constant building, Tarquin embarked on a campaign against the Rutuli. At that time, the Rutuli were a very wealthy nation, and Tarquin was keen to obtain the spoils that would come with victory, in hopes of assuaging the ire of his subjects. Failing to take their capital of Ardea by storm, the king determined to take the city by siege instead.

With little prospect of battle, the young noblemen in the king's army fell to drinking and boasting. When the subject turned to the virtue of their wives, Lucius Tarquinius Collatinus claimed to have the most dedicated of spouses. With his companions, they secretly visited each other's homes, and discovered all of the wives enjoying themselves, except for Lucretia, the wife of Collatinus, who was engaged in domestic activities. Lucretia received the princes graciously, and together her beauty and virtue kindled the flame of desire in Collatinus' cousin, Sextus Tarquinius, the king's son.

After a few days, Sextus returned to Collatia, where he implored Lucretia to give herself to him. When she refused, he threatened that if she did not yield herself to him, he would kill her, and claim that he had discovered her in the act of adultery with a slave, for which reason he had slain the unfaithful Lucretia, delivering the punishment as her husband's kinsman.

To spare her husband the shame threatened by Sextus, Lucretia submitted to his desire. But when he had departed for the camp, Lucretia sent for her husband and father, revealing the whole matter, and accusing Sextus of raping her. Despite the pleas of her family, Lucretia stabbed herself to spare Collatinus any suspicion that she had betrayed him. Her grieving husband, together with his father-in-law, Spurius Lucretius Tricipitinus, and his companions, Lucius Junius Brutus and Publius Valerius, swore an oath to expel the king and his family from Rome.

As Tribune of the Celeres, Brutus was head of the king's personal bodyguard, and entitled to summon the Roman comitia. This he did, and by recounting the various grievances of the people, the king's abuses of power, and by inflaming public sentiment with the tale of the rape of Lucretia, Brutus persuaded the comitia to revoke the king's imperium and send him into exile. Tullia fled the city in fear of the mob, while Sextus Tarquinius, his deed revealed, fled to Gabii, where he hoped for the protection of the Roman garrison. However, his previous conduct there had made him many enemies, and he was soon assassinated. In place of the king, the comitia centuriata resolved to elect two consuls to hold power jointly. Lucretius, the prefect of the city, presided over the election of the first consuls, Brutus and Collatinus.

When word of the uprising reached the king, Tarquin abandoned Ardea and sought support from his allies in Etruria. The cities of Veii and Tarquinii sent contingents to join the king's army, and he prepared to march upon Rome. Meanwhile, Brutus prepared a force to meet the returning army. In a surprising reversal, Brutus demanded that his colleague Collatinus resign the consulship and go into exile because he bore the hated name of Tarquinius. Stunned by this betrayal, Collatinus complied, and his father-in-law was chosen to succeed him.

Meanwhile, the king sent ambassadors to the senate, ostensibly to request the return of his personal property, but in reality to subvert a number of Rome's leading men. When this plot was discovered, those found guilty were put to death by the consuls. Brutus was forced to condemn his two sons Titus and Tiberius to death because they had taken part in the conspiracy. Leaving Lucretius in charge of the city, Brutus departed to meet the king on the field of battle. At the Battle of Silva Arsia, the Romans won a hard-fought victory over the king and his Etruscan allies. Each side sustained painful losses; the consul Brutus and his cousin, Arruns Tarquinius, fell in battle against each other.

After this failure, Tarquin turned to Lars Porsena, the king of Clusium. Porsena's march on Rome and the valiant defence of the Romans achieved legendary status, giving rise to the story of Horatius at the bridge, and the bravery of Gaius Mucius Scaevola. Accounts vary as to whether Porsena finally entered Rome, or was thwarted, but modern scholarship suggests that he was able to occupy the city briefly before withdrawing. Ultimately, his efforts were of no avail to the exiled Roman king.

Tarquin's final attempt to regain the Roman kingdom came in 499 or 496 BC, when he persuaded his son-in-law, Octavius Mamilius, dictator of Tusculum, to march on Rome at the head of a Latin army. The Roman army was led by the dictator Aulus Postumius Albus and his Master of the Horse, Titus Aebutius Elva, while the elderly king and his last remaining son, Titus Tarquinius, accompanied by a force of Roman exiles, fought alongside the Latins. Once more the battle was hard-fought and narrowly decided, with both sides suffering great losses. Mamilius was slain, the master of the horse grievously injured, and Titus Tarquinius barely escaped with his life. But in the end, the Latins abandoned the field, and Rome retained her independence.

After the Latin defeat and the death of his son-in-law, Tarquin went to the court of Aristodemus at Cumae, where he died in 495.

== Modern representations ==
William Shakespeare describes the events leading to Tarquin's downfall in his long poem The Rape of Lucrece. He also alludes to Tarquin in his plays Titus Andronicus, Julius Caesar, Coriolanus, Macbeth and Cymbeline.

The libretto Il trionfo di Clelia by Metastasio is based on events associated with the family of Tarquinius, although he never appears, rather only his son Titus Tarquinius as part of an attempt to restore the Roman monarchy. Nonetheless, Tarquinius is mentioned in Metastasio's summary of the plot as it appears in the librettos for the original production of 1762 set by Johann Adolph Hasse and notable revivals of the libretto set by the Bohemian composers Cristoph Willibald Gluck in 1763 and Josef Mysliveček in 1768.

In 1765, Patrick Henry gave a speech before the Virginia House of Burgesses in opposition to the Stamp Act of 1765. Toward the end of his speech, he inserted as a rhetorical flourish a comparison between King George III and various historical figures who were brought low by their enemies, including Charles I, Caesar and, in some accounts, Tarquin.

The cultural phenomenon known as "tall poppy syndrome", in which persons of unusual merit are attacked or resented because of their achievements, derives its name from the episode in Livy in which Tarquin is said to have instructed his son Sextus to weaken the city of Gabii by destroying its leading men. The motif of using an unwitting messenger to deliver such a message through the metaphor of cutting the heads off the tallest poppies may have been borrowed from Herodotus, whose Histories contain a similar story involving ears of wheat instead of poppies. A passage concerning Livy's version of the story appears in Kierkegaard's Fear and Trembling.

Benjamin Britten employed the character in his 1946 chamber opera The Rape of Lucretia.

Tarquin also appears in the fourth book of The Trials of Apollo series by Rick Riordan. He is depicted as a zombie king who attacks the demigods for trying to rewrite the Sibylline Books.

Tarquin Superbus is a character in Claire-Louis Bennet's novel Checkout 19.

== Bibliography ==
=== Modern sources ===
- Chisholm, Hugh, ed. (1911). "Tarquinius Superbus, Lucius" . Encyclopædia Britannica. Vol. 26 (11th ed.). Cambridge University Press. p. 431.
- Cornell, Tim (1995). The beginnings of Rome. London: Routledge. ISBN 0-415-01596-0. OCLC 31515793.
- Cornell, Tim (2014). "Tarquinius Superbus, Lucius". In Hornblower, Simon; Spawforth, Antony; Eidinow, Esther (eds.). The Oxford companion to classical civilization (2nd ed.). New York: Oxford University Press. p. 767. ISBN 978-0-19-177848-3. OCLC 900444999.
- Hart, James D; Leininger, Phillip, eds. (1995). The Oxford Companion to American Literature. Oxford University Press. ISBN 978-0-19-506548-0.
- Lippitt, John (2003). Routledge Philosophy Guidebook to Kierkegaard and Fear and Trembling. Routledge. ISBN 978-0-415-18047-4.
- Simpson, DP, ed. (1963). Cassell's New Compact Latin-English English-Latin Dictionary. Funk & Wagnalls.

=== Ancient sources ===
- Dionysius of Halicarnassus, Romaike Archaiologia (Roman Antiquities).
- Titus Livius (Livy), History of Rome.
- Gaius Plinius Secundus (Pliny the Elder), Historia Naturalis (Natural History).
- Maurus Servius Honoratus (Servius), Ad Virgilii Aeneidem Commentarii (Commentary on Vergil's Aeneid).

Legendary titles
Preceded by Servius Tullius	King of Rome; 534/5–509 BC	Office abolished
