= Prisci Latini =

Prisci Latini (or Prisci et Latini) may refer to:

- Aborigines (mythology) in Roman mythology
- Albani people from the ancient city Alba Longa

== See also ==
- Latins (Italic tribe), an Italic tribe which included the early inhabitants of the city of Rome
