= Attus Navius =

Roman augur

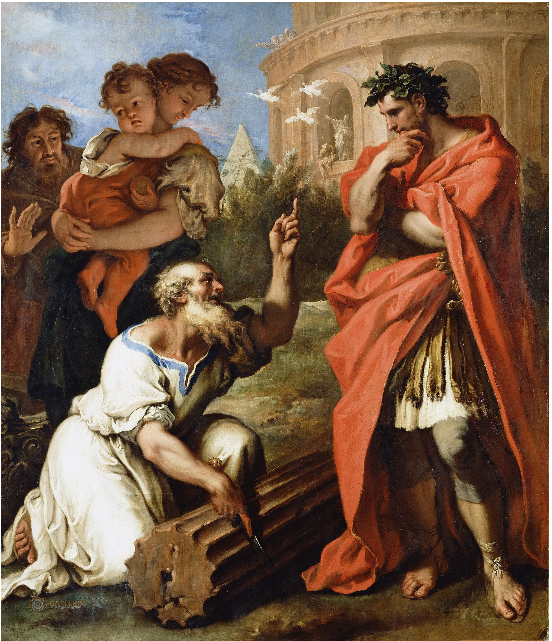
Tarquin the Elder consulting Attus Nevius the Augur, Ricci, Sebastiano

In Ancient Roman mythology, Attus Navius was a famous augur during the reign of Tarquinius Priscus.

When Tarquinius desired to increase the number of the equestrian centuries, and to name them in his own honour, Navius opposed him, declaring that it must not be done unless the omens were propitious, and, as a proof of his powers of divination, cut through a whetstone with a razor. Navius's statue, with head veiled (capite velato), stood in the Comitium, next to the senate-house (Livy 1.36.5); the whetstone and razor were buried in the same place, and a puteal placed over them. According to Dionysius, it was Tarquinius Priscus who set the statue up, "in front of the senate-house near the sacred fig-tree; it was shorter than a man of average height and the head was covered". The sacred fig-tree was named after Attius Navius: Navian.

It was reported that Navius was subsequently put to death by Tarquinius. According to Schwegler, the puteal originally indicated that the place had been struck by lightning, and the story is a reminiscence of the early struggle between the state and ecclesiasticism.

== See also ==
- Naevia gens
