= Lucius Tarquinius Priscus =

- Fifth King of Rome
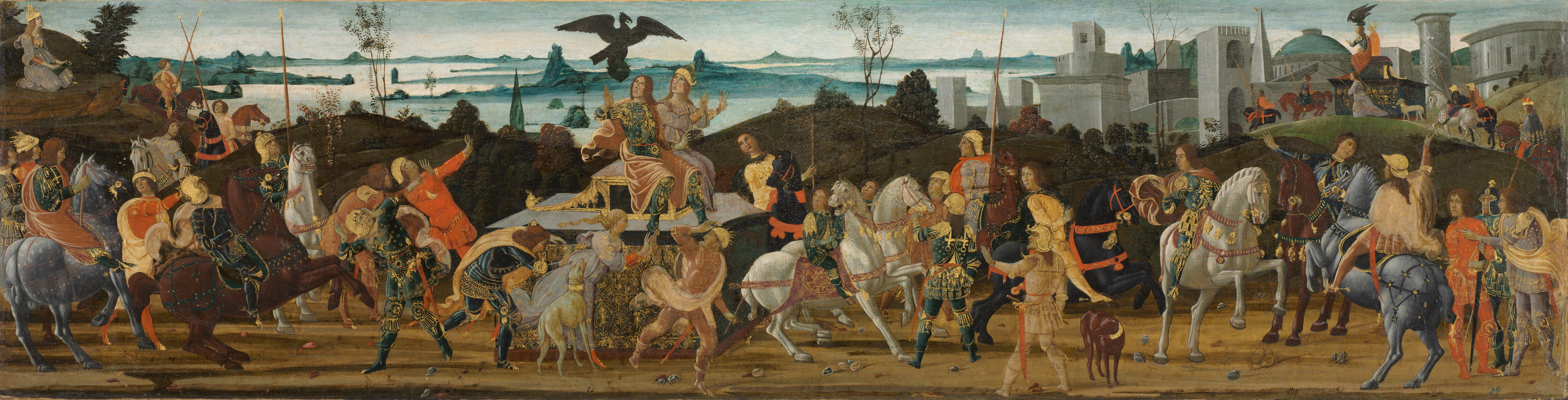
- Tarquinius Priscus Entering Rome, Jacopo del Sellaio, c. 1470, Cleveland Museum of Art. The left section depicts Tanaquil conveying her prophecy, while the right shows Tarquinius entering Rome in a triumphal procession.

King of Rome
- Reign: c. 616 – 578/579 BC (Note: The dates of his reign are disputed among ancient sources. Livy and Dionysius of Halicarnassus give 616 BC as the accession date, while the Fasti Triumphales records certain campaigns differently; the date of death appears as either 578 or 579 BC. Modern historians treat these dates as approximate.)
- Coronation: Unknown (Note: Ancient sources provide no detail about a coronation ceremony. It is known that he assumed power following the vote of the Comitia Curiata.)
- Predecessor: Ancus Marcius
- Successor: Servius Tullius
- Born: c. 650 BC (Note: The exact birth date is unknown. Given that he acceded to the throne around 616 BC and reigned for a long period, c. 650 BC is an estimate.); Tarquinii, Etruria
- Died: c. 578/579 BC; Rome
- Burial: Unknown (Note: Ancient sources provide no information on the date or place of burial.); Unknown
- Spouse: Tanaquil
- Issue: Tarquinia; Lucius Tarquinius Superbus (possibly grandson); Arruns Tarquinius (Note: Ancient sources differ on the children of Tarquinius. Livy mentions at least two sons and one daughter; his daughter Tarquinia married Servius Tullius. Lucius and Arruns appear in later generations in connection with Tarquinius Superbus.)
Names
- Lucius Tarquinius Priscus
- House: Tarquinian dynasty
- Father: Demaratus
- Mother: Unknown (Note: Her name does not appear in ancient sources. Livy and Dionysius of Halicarnassus only note that she was an aristocratic woman of Etruscan origin.)
- Occupation: Rex

Lucius Tarquinius Priscus (Classical Latin pronunciation: [tarˈkʷɪniʊs ˈpriːskʊs], or Tarquin the Elder) was the legendary fifth king of Rome and the first representative of the Etruscan dynasty on the Roman throne. The cognomen Priscus, meaning "Old" or "Elder" in Latin, became established in ancient sources to distinguish him from Tarquinius Superbus, or Tarquin the Proud, the seventh and last Roman king. He reigned for thirty-eight years. His wife was Tanaquil, renowned for her gift of prophecy. Tarquinius expanded Rome through military conquest; constructed enduring infrastructure such as the Circus Maximus and the Cloaca Maxima; reorganised state institutions including the Senate and the army; celebrated Rome's first triumphal procession (triumphus); and introduced numerous Etruscan civil and military symbols into Roman tradition—most notably the fasces, the curule seat, the toga praetexta, and the paludamentum.

== Name and origin ==
According to Livy, Tarquinius Priscus came from Tarquinii, an Etruscan city, and his original Etruscan name was Lucumo. However, modern scholars note that lucumo was in fact a title or designation of political rank among the Etruscans (Etruscan lauchume, meaning "king"), and it is therefore thought that the ancient tradition may have conflated his personal name with his title. His father was Demaratus, a Greek merchant from Corinth. According to Dionysius of Halicarnassus, Demaratus belonged to the Bacchiadae, one of Corinth's established oligarchic families, and had amassed a considerable fortune through trade between Etruria and Greece. When Cypselus overthrew the Bacchiadae and established his tyranny at Corinth, Demaratus, fearing for his safety due to his great wealth, left the city and settled in Tarquinii. There he married an aristocratic Etruscan woman and had two sons, Arruns and Lucumo (Tarquinius). Arruns died childless before his father, and Demaratus died shortly afterwards of grief, leaving his entire fortune to his only surviving son, Lucumo. Pliny records that when Demaratus departed Corinth he brought Greek artists with him to Etruria, thereby introducing Corinthian pottery and artistic traditions to the region.

== Youth and migration to Rome ==
After inheriting his father's wealth, Tarquinius attempted to obtain political office in Tarquinii; however, this was denied to him because of his Greek-born father, and he was not admitted even to the middle ranks. His wife Tanaquil, who was highly gifted in prophecy, recognised that they would never be fully accepted among the Etruscan nobility and persuaded her husband to migrate to Rome, for they had heard that the Romans welcomed foreigners and readily granted them citizenship.

According to ancient tradition, the omen occurred as the couple first caught sight of Rome from the Janiculum. An eagle descended from the sky, snatched the cap from Tarquin's head, soared high, then descended again and replaced the cap precisely upon his head. Tanaquil, skilled in interpreting omens, took this as a sign that he would rise from his present station to a throne. This scene of prophecy is also recounted in epic verse by Ennius.

After settling in Rome, Lucumo adopted the Latin name Lucius Tarquinius, replacing Lucumo in accordance with Latin convention: Lucius as his personal name and Tarquinius as his family name, derived from the city of his birth. According to Dionysius, the Roman king Ancus Marcius enrolled him and his Etruscan retinue into a tribe and a curia, and assigned them land and a house in the city. Lucius quickly gained prestige through his generosity, intelligence, and valour in battle; he became Ancus' most trusted adviser, and the king ultimately appointed him guardian of his sons.

== Rise to kingship ==
The principle of hereditary monarchy had not yet taken root in Rome. Even Ancus Marcius, grandson of Numa Pompilius, had not succeeded his father to the throne; none of the first three kings had been followed by their own sons, and each successive king had been acclaimed by the people. Upon the death of Ancus, while the king's sons were still young boys, Tarquinius sent them away briefly on a hunting trip and then delivered an impressive speech before the Comitia Curiata, arguing that he ought to be elected king, successfully persuading the assembly. In one tradition it is also recorded that Ancus' sons were at the time on a hunting expedition and were therefore unable to influence the assembly's decision. Cicero, in De Republica, discusses in detail the legitimacy of Tarquinius' power and the transition to his successor, Servius Tullius. Thus Tarquinius Priscus became the first king in Roman history to actively lobby for the throne and to succeed in that endeavour.

== The role of Tanaquil ==
Tanaquil was far more than a consort during the reign of Tarquinius Priscus; she emerges as a politically decisive figure. It is known that women in Etruscan tradition held an important position in the fields of prophecy and religious ceremony, and Tanaquil stands as one of the most striking representatives of that tradition in the ancient sources.

Tanaquil's role was determinative even before Tarquinius reached the throne: it was she who persuaded her husband to migrate to Rome at a time when he was blocked politically in Tarquinii, and who interpreted the eagle omen on the Janiculum, foreseeing his rise to kingship. Throughout the reign she remained an active adviser in the religious and political decisions of the royal court. Ancient sources emphasise that she had a thorough knowledge of the Etruscan tradition of divination (haruspicina) and that she brought this knowledge to the Roman court.

At the end of the reign, when Tarquinius was assassinated, Tanaquil managed the transfer of power with extraordinary composure and effectively ensured the accession of Servius Tullius.

== Children ==
Ancient sources do not present a consistent picture of the children of Tarquinius Priscus. According to Livy, Tarquinius had at least two sons and one daughter.

His daughter Tarquinia married his successor, Servius Tullius; this marriage formalised the political bond between the Tarquinian dynasty and Servius. His sons Lucius and Arruns asserted their claims to the kingship after their father's death, but their claim came to nothing through Tanaquil's intervention. Both continue to be mentioned in connection with Tarquinius Superbus in subsequent generations through complex lines of descent. Disputed traditions exist holding that Arruns was either the father or the brother of Tarquinius Superbus (Tarquin the Proud); ancient sources are inconsistent on this point. (Note: The precise relationship of Arruns to Tarquinius Superbus is disputed in the ancient sources. While Fabius Pictor regards Superbus as the son of Priscus, some modern historians, on account of chronological difficulties, treat him as a grandson. The place of Lucius and Arruns in this scheme has also not been conclusively resolved.)

Servius later married his own daughters to Lucius and Arruns; the generation produced by these unions stood at the centre of the conflicts that would shape the final period of the Roman Kingdom.

== Military campaigns ==
=== War against the Latins ===
The first campaign of Tarquinius was waged against the Latins. He captured the city of Apiolae by storm and brought great plunder back to Rome. According to the Fasti Triumphales, this war must have taken place before 588 BC. (Note: The date of the Latin campaign recorded in the Fasti Triumphales (c. 588 BC) does not always align with Livy's general chronology of 616–578 BC. Modern historians accept this date as only approximate and refrain from establishing a definitive sequence. See Cornell, "Tarquinius Priscus".) When the Latins declared that the peace treaties concluded in the time of Romulus and the other Roman kings were no longer valid, Tarquinius responded by conquering several Latin cities and bringing them under Roman authority. The Latins thereupon sought help from the Sabines and the Etruscans; but Tarquinius, without dividing his forces, kept the Latin front as his primary objective and emerged victorious.

=== War against the Sabines ===
After defeating the Latins, Tarquinius turned against the Sabines. The Sabine base camp was situated at the confluence of two rivers, a position that allowed their forces to move quickly and efficiently. Tarquinius employed a night-raid strategy: he set a fleet of small boats ablaze and sent them downriver towards the Sabine camp; while the Sabines were occupied with extinguishing the flames, he stormed the camp. In a subsequent Sabine attack, the fighting extended into the streets of Rome itself, yet Tarquinius emerged victorious from these fierce engagements as well. In the ensuing peace negotiations, the town of Collatia was ceded to Rome, and Tarquinius' nephew Egerius was appointed garrison commander there. Tarquinius returned to Rome and celebrated a triumph on 13 September 585 BC.

=== Subjugation of the Latin cities ===
Following the Sabine victory, the cities of Corniculum, old Ficulea, Cameria, Crustumerium, Ameriola, Medullia, and Nomentum submitted and came under Roman administration.

=== War against the Etruscans ===
Tarquinius wished to make peace with the Etruscans, but they refused. Because Tarquinius had kept captured Etruscan auxiliary troops as prisoners for their interference in the Sabine war, five Etruscan cities that had taken part declared war on Rome, and seven further cities joined them. The Roman colony of Fidenae, which became the focal point of the conflict, was captured by the Etruscans. After several bloody engagements Tarquinius was again victorious and reduced the Etruscan cities that had participated in the war to submission. According to Pliny, various monuments were erected with the spoils taken during these wars, and bronze statues commemorating Tarquinius' victories of 616–579 BC were placed in the Forum. Justin records that during this period Phocaean Greeks began settling on the coasts of Italy, and that these migrations occurred in an environment shaped by Tarquinius as he defined the relationships between Rome and neighbouring peoples.

== Institutional reforms ==
In addition to his military achievements, Tarquinius carried out institutional reforms that profoundly affected the structure of the Roman state.

=== Reform of the Senate ===
According to Livy, Tarquinius doubled the membership of the Senate by adding one hundred men drawn from lesser noble families (minorum gentium), bringing the total to two hundred. The new senators were designated patres minorum gentium (fathers from the lesser noble families), while the existing senators received the title patres majorum gentium (fathers from the greater noble families). Among these new senators were the Octavii family, from whom the first Roman emperor, Augustus, would descend. Tarquinius' intention was that these families would feel indebted to him for their position and thus remain loyal, thereby strengthening his rule.

=== Reform of the cavalry and the episode of Attus Navius ===
Tarquinius wished to add three new cavalry centuries (equites) to the three centuries established in the time of Romulus, naming them after himself and two of his close friends. However, the celebrated augur Attus Navius objected, arguing that Romulus had founded the cavalry centuries with divine approval, and declared that no change could be made without first obtaining divine sanction.

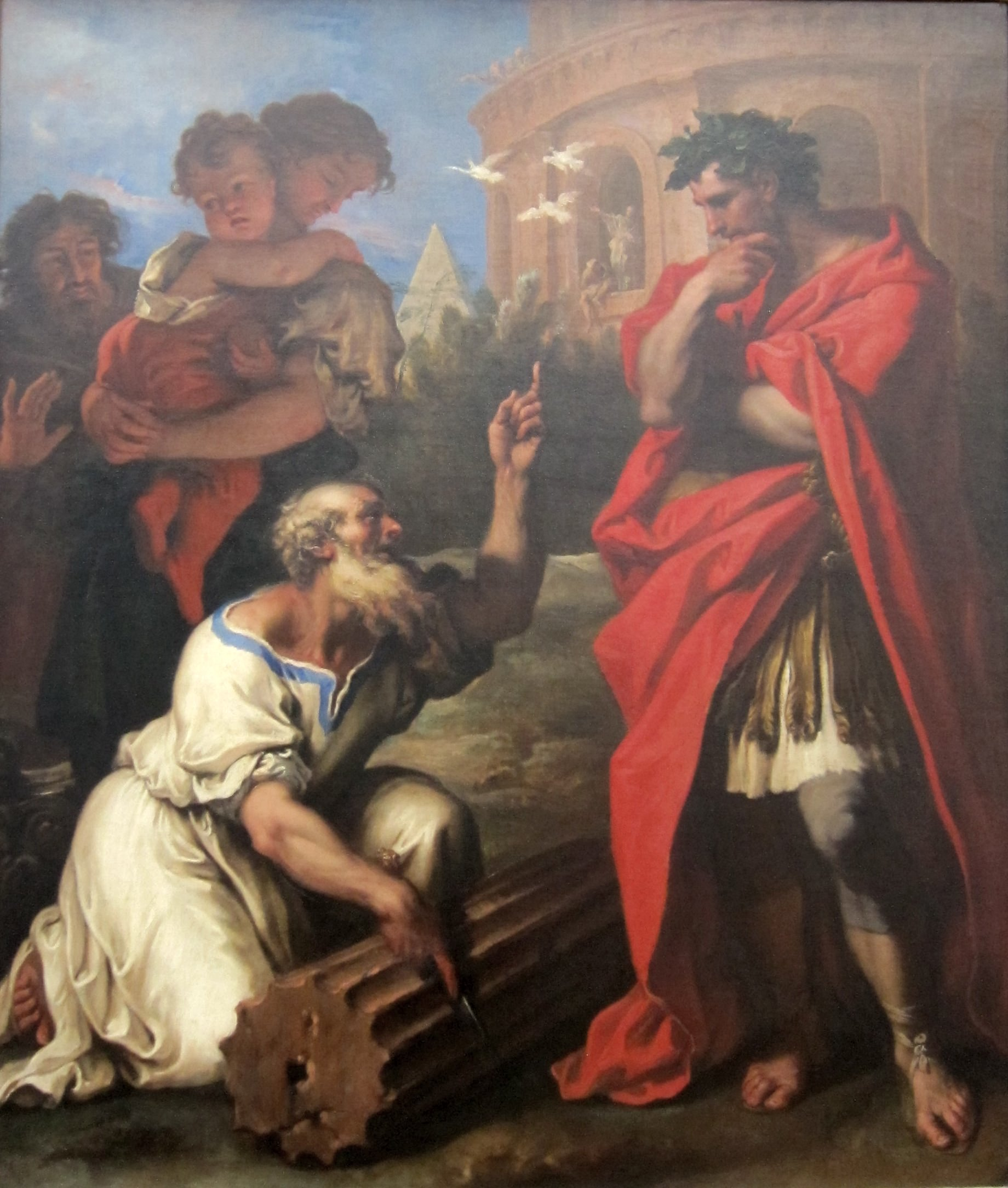
Tarquin the Elder Consulting Attius Navius, Sebastiano Ricci, c. 1690, J. Paul Getty Museum. The scene depicts Tarquinius testing the augur with an apparently impossible miracle.

During this dispute, which is recounted at length in the ancient sources, Tarquinius put the augur's abilities to the test by asking: "Tell me whether what I am now thinking can be done." Attus Navius observed the birds and replied that it could; whereupon Tarquinius said: "What I was thinking was to cut this whetstone in two with a razor — do it!" According to Livy's account, Attus Navius cut the whetstone in two with the razor without any hesitation. In the face of this miracle, Tarquinius abandoned the idea of creating new centuries; instead he added a second century to each existing one, bringing the total to six. A statue of Attus Navius with head veiled was later erected at the Comitium, beside the senate house; beneath it the whetstone and razor were buried in the earth. Aulus Gellius, while recounting this episode, also discusses the place of Attus Navius among historical augurs.

=== Imperium and constitutional arrangement ===
The reign of Tarquinius Priscus is also regarded as the period in which the framework of executive power (imperium) in Rome was defined. Some modern historians argue that royal authority—particularly in the sphere of military command—became more clearly articulated during this period. Tarquinius provided the earliest examples of taking decisions on war and peace jointly with the Senate; this foreshadows the institutions of the later republican era. In De Re Publica, Cicero discusses the manner of Tarquinius' accession as simultaneously a legitimate and a destabilising precedent, a tension that became a central theme in subsequent Roman constitutional debate.

== Religious policy ==
The reign of Tarquinius Priscus is considered a critical period in the shaping of Rome's religious institutions. The king systematically introduced into the Roman court the Etruscan practices of haruspicina (divination through the inspection of entrails) and auguratio (reading omens from the flight of birds). These traditions laid the groundwork for Etruscan religious specialists (haruspices) to secure a permanent place in Roman state ritual.

The episode of Attus Navius is read not merely as an institutional dispute but as a symbolic episode illustrating the limits of royal power vis-à-vis religious authority. Ancient commentators transmitted this episode to subsequent generations as proof of the divine guardianship watching over Roman institutions.

By laying the foundations of the Temple of Jupiter Optimus Maximus on the Capitoline Hill, Tarquinius conveyed both a religious and a political message through this monumental structure dedicated to Rome's supreme deity: the identification of Rome's universal dominion with Jupiter's protection. The quadriga statue placed in the temple is said to have been made of fired clay by Etruscan craftsmen, a detail that directly reflects the contribution of Etruscan artistic tradition to Roman religious architecture.

Valerius Maximus records various episodes of divination from the reign of Tarquinius, underlining the importance of this reign in Rome's religious consciousness.

== Building works ==
=== Circus Maximus ===
Tarquinius Priscus built the Circus Maximus, Rome's first and largest chariot-racing stadium. Previously, spectators had watched races from wooden stands on the plain between the Aventine and Palatine hills. Tarquinius constructed permanent seating in this area and designated separate sections for senators and equestrians. According to Livy, the first horses and boxers to compete were brought from Etruria. The structure received the name Circus Maximus (Greatest Racecourse) to distinguish it from other stadiums of similar type being built at the time. Pliny also mentions the Circus when discussing public buildings of this period.

=== Cloaca Maxima ===
Following a great flood, the Cloaca Maxima (Great Sewer) was constructed to drain the low-lying marshy areas of Rome and prepare the ground for the establishment of the Forum Romanum. Said to have been completed in 578 BC, the structure drew inspiration from Etruscan engineering tradition. Pliny describes in detail the difficult conditions of the construction and calls the durability of the tunnels across centuries a great achievement of Roman engineering. Cassius Hemina also provides information on this construction in his now-lost work.

=== Temple of Jupiter and the city walls ===
Tarquinius began the construction of a great temple to Jupiter Optimus Maximus on the Capitoline Hill; part of the cost of this temple was met by the spoils of the Sabine and Latin campaigns. He also had a stone wall built around the city. Neither structure was completed during Tarquinius' reign. The Temple of Jupiter in particular remained a long-term project; construction continued under his successor Servius Tullius and was finally completed and dedicated under Tarquinius Superbus in 509 BC. Pliny mentions the statues and monuments erected in the Forum during the reign of Tarquinius.

== Introduction of Etruscan symbols and traditions to Rome ==
Tarquinius Priscus goes down in history as the ruler who organised Rome's first triumphal procession (triumphus). According to Florus, he conducted this ceremony in fully Etruscan fashion—riding in a gold-plated chariot drawn by four horses, wearing a gold-embroidered toga and a tunic adorned with palm-leaf embroidery (tunica palmata). Pliny independently confirms that this triumphal tradition was established by Tarquinius.

Tarquinius also introduced numerous Etruscan civil and military symbols to Rome. These include: the royal sceptre (sceptrum); the trabea, a purple garment; the fasces carried by the lictors; the curule chair (sella curulis); the toga praetexta, later adopted by various magistrates and officials; the rings worn by senators; the paludamentum cloak associated with military command; and the phalera, a metal disc worn on a soldier's breastplate or displayed on unit standards. Strabo records that Tarquinius also introduced Etruscan sacrificial and divinatory rites as well as the tuba, a straight horn used chiefly for military purposes. Pliny also discusses when senators adopted the wearing of rings, noting the statue of Tarquinius without a ring in this connection.

== Archaeology and Etruscan context ==
The number of archaeological finds directly attributable to the reign of Tarquinius Priscus is limited, since the period of the Roman Kingdom has largely been buried under subsequent construction and urban transformation. Nevertheless, excavations at Tarquinii and Etruscan tomb finds illuminate the material culture used by Etruscan elites in the seventh and sixth centuries BC—precious metalwork, imported Greek pottery, and palatial architecture—findings that lend support to the artistic and ceremonial elements said to have been brought to Rome by Tarquinius.

A scene on the wall frescoes of the François Tomb near Vulci (fourth century BC) depicts the saga of the brothers Aulus Vibenna and Caelius Vibenna. Among the figures shown is one named "Gnaeus Tarquinius Romanus", and the possible connection of this individual to Priscus is a matter of debate among historians. Excavations beneath the Forum Romanum point to monumental building phases dating to the sixth century BC and have uncovered channels thought to belong to an early version of the Cloaca Maxima, a finding consistent with the building works attributed to Tarquinius by ancient sources.

== Historicity and reliability of the sources ==
Modern historians treat the greater part of the traditional accounts concerning Tarquinius Priscus not as historical facts but as legendary foundation narratives shaped in a later era—particularly within Rome's first historiographical tradition of the fourth and third centuries BC. The primary sources, Livy and Dionysius of Halicarnassus, wrote approximately five hundred years after these events, relying on earlier sources—annalistic writers such as Quintus Fabius Pictor, who survive only in fragments. This annalistic tradition emerged from the late third century BC onwards; after Fabius Pictor, writers such as Calpurnius Piso, Cassius Hemina, and Sempronius Tuditanus transmitted the narrative of the same period with differing emphases. Their works have largely been lost, with only fragments quoted in later sources surviving. The annalistic tradition available to Livy and Dionysius had itself been shaped and partially reinterpreted over several centuries of transmission.

The 1911 Encyclopædia Britannica stressed that the legend of Tarquinius Priscus consisted largely of a reworking of the traditions of Romulus and Tullus Hostilius, and noted that the account of his Corinthian origins was chronologically impossible. Modern specialists such as Tim Cornell carefully distinguish the archaeologically documentable portions of the Roman Kingdom period from the literary tradition, arguing that the material evidence supporting the infrastructure projects of the Circus Maximus and the Cloaca Maxima rests on more solid foundations than the personal narratives recounting Tarquinius' reign.

The dates of his reign are also disputed. Livy's dates of 616–578 BC and the triumph dates recorded in the Fasti Triumphales sometimes fail to align. In particular, the Latin campaign attributed to as early a date as 588 BC is difficult to place within the general chronology. This chronological inconsistency suggests that the historical sequence of events attributed to Tarquinius Priscus—if such a sequence ever existed—may have been rearranged or symbolically rounded in ancient historiography. Modern historians accept these dates as only approximate and refrain from establishing a definitive chronology.

Orosius, offers a general summary of the reign of Tarquinius, positioning it as an early phase in the history of Rome's expansion; however, modern historians regard Orosius' account as a second-hand summary derived from Livy and reinterpreted within a Christian apologetic framework.

Some researchers, on the other hand, argue that the close cultural ties between Rome and Etruria are confirmed by archaeological evidence, and that it is difficult to dismiss entirely the historical kernel of a figure of Etruscan origin ruling Rome. In this context, Tarquinius is interpreted as the legendary embodiment of a genuine Etruscan cultural transfer that archaeology has confirmed.

== Lineage and relationship to Tarquinius Superbus ==
The great majority of ancient writers regarded Tarquinius Superbus, the seventh and last king of Rome, as the son of Priscus; yet some sources describe the younger Tarquinius as his grandson. Given that the younger Tarquinius died around 496 BC—approximately eighty years after Priscus—the chronology lends support to the grandson tradition. Fabius Pictor, one of Rome's earliest historians, held that Superbus was the son of Priscus, but modern historians find this relationship problematic in terms of the traditional chronology.

An Etruscan legend transmitted by the emperor Claudius identifies Servius Tullius with Mastarna, the companion of the Etruscan hero brothers Caelius Vibenna and Aulus Vibenna. This legend is also depicted in the frescoes of the François Tomb at Vulci. The tradition implies that the sons of the elder Tarquinius attempted to seize power but were defeated by Servius and his allies. Wishing to put an end to this dynastic struggle, Servius married his daughters to the grandsons of Priscus; yet the plan ultimately failed, and Servius was himself murdered by his son-in-law.

== Death and its aftermath ==
According to ancient tradition, Tarquinius met his death at the end of a thirty-eight-year reign at the hands of assassins organised by the sons of his predecessor Ancus Marcius. The sons resented Tarquinius' accession to the throne and, using a popular disturbance or a staged quarrel as a pretext, inflicted a fatal blow to the king's head with an axe.

Tanaquil, however, managed the situation with great skill: she announced that Tarquinius was merely wounded, and exploiting the confusion she designated her stepson (or, according to some sources, her slave) Servius Tullius as regent. When the king's death was confirmed, Servius ascended the throne as the rightful successor rather than the sons of Ancus or Tarquinius' own sons. Cicero discusses this transfer of power and the legitimacy of Servius in detail in De Re Publica.

It is said that Servius Tullius was the son of a prince of Corniculum who had fallen in battle against Tarquinius, and that his mother was a woman named Ocreisia. Mother and child were brought to the palace as slaves after the fall of Corniculum. Tanaquil discerned Servius' potential for greatness through various omens and therefore preferred him to her own sons. The most remarkable of these signs, as reported by the ancient sources, was a ring of fire seen around the head of the sleeping child; those who witnessed it were seized with great fear, while Tanaquil calmed them and interpreted the vision as a portent of future magnificence. Servius subsequently married Tarquinia, one of the daughters of Priscus, and later gave his own daughters in marriage to Tarquinius' sons (or, in some traditions, grandsons) Lucius and Arruns.

== Significance and legacy ==
Tarquinius Priscus is regarded as a transformative figure in Roman history not only in legendary terms but also in institutional terms. The reforms he carried out during his reign laid the foundations for many of the institutions Rome would adopt in the centuries that followed.

Through his reform of the Senate he incorporated new families into the governing structure, becoming the first ruler to formally recognise Rome's expanding social base at the institutional level. This step is considered a forerunner of the novus homo (new man) tradition of the later republican era. His reorganisation of the cavalry centuries and the episode of Attus Navius—which brought to the fore the question of divine approval—were frequently cited by republican-era writers as an early example of how religious and civil authority were articulated in relation to each other in Rome.

His legacy in the field of construction was tangible and enduring. The Circus Maximus remained the centre of Rome's entertainment life into the imperial era, and the Cloaca Maxima survives as one of the most long-lived engineering structures of the ancient world. The infrastructure works that prepared the ground for the formation of the Forum Romanum played a decisive role in the physical shaping of the city of Rome.

The introduction of Etruscan symbols and ceremonies to Rome, the establishment of the triumphus tradition, and the adoption of elements constituting the visual expression of magistrate titles—the fasces, the toga praetexta, and the curule seat—make Tarquinius a key figure in the formation of Roman state culture. These symbols persisted throughout the republican and imperial periods. The fasces in particular continued to live as a powerful symbol in later ages; the Italian Fascist movement of the twentieth century adopted this symbol directly into its name and iconography, though this modern use represents an ideologically reinterpreted appropriation entirely disconnected from its ancient origins.

Finally, Tarquinius is also read as an early embodiment of Rome's ethnically and culturally inclusive character. As the son of a Corinthian father, raised in Etruria, who migrated to Rome and rose to the highest office despite his foreign origins, he represents one of the earliest examples of the multicultural conception of power that Rome would continue to embody in subsequent periods.

== Tarquinius Priscus in art and literature ==
Scenes from the reign of Tarquinius Priscus were depicted from antiquity through the Renaissance and early modern era.

Among ancient sources, the lost epic Annales of Ennius recounts the eagle omen on the Janiculum in the language of epic poetry; this passage made a significant contribution to the literary tradition.

In the visual arts, one of the most celebrated works is the painting Tarquinius Priscus Entering Rome by the Florentine painter Jacopo del Sellaio, dated to around 1470. Now in the Cleveland Museum of Art, this work presents in a single composition both the triumphal procession of Tarquinius and the scene of Tanaquil's prophecy. In the left section Tanaquil is shown interpreting the omen, while in the right Tarquinius enters Rome in a magnificent cortège.

The painting Tarquin the Elder Consulting Attius Navius by the Venetian painter Sebastiano Ricci, dated to around 1690, is held in the collection of the J. Paul Getty Museum. Rendered in the Baroque manner, this work brings to life the dramatic scene of Tarquinius testing the augur to cut the whetstone. Both works are significant in demonstrating how the ancient narrative was reinterpreted for patrons and audiences of later eras.

== See also ==
- Tanaquil
- Servius Tullius
- Lucius Tarquinius Superbus
- Roman Kingdom
- Etruscans
- Tarquinii
- Demaratus
- Circus Maximus
- Cloaca Maxima
- Attus Navius
- François Tomb
- List of kings of Rome
- Jacopo del Sellaio
- Sebastiano Ricci
- Comitia Curiata
- Haruspex
- Triumphus

Regnal titles
Preceded by Ancus Marcius	King of Rome c. 616 – 578/579 BC	Succeeded by Servius Tullius
