= Coruncania gens =

Ancient Roman family

The gens Coruncania was a plebeian family at ancient Rome. The first of the family to come to prominence was Tiberius Coruncanius, a novus homo who became consul in 280 BC, and dictator in 246.

== Origin ==
According to Cicero, Tiberius Coruncanius was a native of Tusculum. However, in a speech recorded by Tacitus, the emperor Claudius stated that the Coruncanii were originally from Cameria.

== Praenomina ==
The praenomina associated with the Coruncanii who appear in history are Tiberius, Gaius, Lucius, and perhaps Publius. The various Coruncanii known only from inscriptions used a variety of names, including the common praenomina Quintus, Gaius, Gnaeus, Lucius, Marcus, and Sextus. There are individual instances of Aulus, Manius, and perhaps Spurius, but Aulus and Spurius are known only from filiations, while the only Manius was a freedman, so these may not have been regular praenomina of the Coruncanii.

== Branches and cognomina ==
The only distinct family of the Coruncanii during the Republic bore no surname. A variety of cognomina appear in inscriptions, but there is no evidence that any of them represented distinct families of the Coruncanii; many of these surnames belonged to freedmen.

== Members ==
This list includes abbreviated praenomina. For an explanation of this practice, see filiation.

- Tiberius Coruncanius, grandfather of the consul of 280 BC.
- Tiberius Coruncanius Ti. f., father of the consul of 280 BC.
- Tiberius Coruncanius Ti. f. Ti. n., consul in 280 BC, he triumphed over the Etruscans. He was probably censor around 270 (Note: Coruncanius seems to have been censor about the 34th lustrum with Gaius Claudius Canina; a number of sources imply it, but no authority explicitly gives the date.), became the first plebeian Pontifex Maximus circa 254, and was dictator in 246. Coruncanius was a distinguished orator and jurist.
- Gaius and Lucius Coruncanius (Ti. f. Ti. n.), (Note: Polybius calls them Gaius and Lucius, while Pliny calls them Publius (or substitutes Publius Junius) and Tiberius.) ambassadors sent to Teuta in 230 BC, to complain of the maritime depredations of her subjects. Lucius was put to death at her orders, provoking the First Illyrian War.
- Coruncania A. l., a freedwoman named on a monument from Nuceria.
- Coruncania C. f., one of the daughters of Gaius Caecilius Gallus, a soldier and municipal official, and his wife, Proxinia Procula, named on a monument at Rusicade in Numidia.
- Aulus Coruncanius, the former master of Coruncania.
- Gaius Coruncanius, the father of Gaius Coruncanius Oricula.
- Gaius Coruncanius, the former master of Gaius Coruncanius Hilarus.
- Lucius Coruncanius, the former master of Lucius Coruncanius Laches.
- Gnaeus Coruncanius, the father of Gnaeus Coruncanius Rufus.
- Manius Coruncanius M. s., a slave named in an inscription from Minturnae.
- Marcus Coruncanius, master of Manius.
- Quintus Coruncanius, the former master of Coruncania Pasis.
- Quintus Coruncanius, the former master of Quintus Coruncanius Theucer.
- Sextus Coruncanius, the former master of Sextus Coruncanius Chilo and Coruncania Chila.
- Spurius Coruncanius, the father of Coruncania Tertia.
- Coruncania Sex. l. Chila, a freedwoman buried at Rome.
- Sextus Coruncanius Sex. l. Chilo, a freedman buried at Rome.
- Coruncania Q. l. Creste, a freedwoman buried at Rome.
- Quintus Coruncanius Q. l. Eros, a freedman buried at Rome.
- Gnaeus Coruncanius Faustinus, buried at Vicus Augusti in Sardinia, aged twenty-five.
- (Quinta?) Coruncania Hilara, named in a funerary inscription from Rome.
- Gaius Coruncanius C. l. Hilarus, a freedman who became one of the Seviri Augustales at Augusta Taurinorum.
- Coruncania Sex. f. Ismurna, buried at Rome.
- Lucius Coruncanius L. l. Laches, a freedman buried at Rome.
- Gaius Coruncanius C. f. Oricula, a praefectus fabrum, or military engineer, and military tribune with the twenty-first legion, buried at Rome, with a monument dedicated by his wife, Julia Pia.
- Coruncania Q. l. Pasis, a freedwoman named in an inscription from Rome.
- Gnaeus Coruncanius Cn. f. Rufus, one of the officials who presided over the rites of Diana at Rome, circa AD 1.
- Quintus Coruncanius Statius, the former master of Quintus Coruncanius Eros and Coruncania Creste, buried at Rome.
- Coruncania S. f. Tertia, named in an inscription from Rome.
- Quintus Coruncanius Q. l. Theucer, a freedman buried at Rome.
- Marcus Aurelius Coruncanius Victor, buried at Rome with his wife, Vitella Romana, in their family sepulchre.

== See also ==
- List of Roman gentes

== Bibliography ==
- Polybius, Historiae (The Histories).
- Marcus Tullius Cicero, Brutus, Cato Maior de Senectute, De Legibus, De Natura Deorum, De Oratore, Pro Plancio.
- Marcus Velleius Paterculus, Compendium of Roman History.
- Lucius Annaeus Seneca (Seneca the Younger), Epistulae Morales ad Lucilium (Moral Letters to Lucilius).
- Gaius Plinius Secundus (Pliny the Elder), Historia Naturalis (Natural History).
- Publius Cornelius Tacitus, Annales.
- Appianus Alexandrinus (Appian), De Rebus Illyricis (On the Matter of the Illyrians), Bellum Samniticum (The Samnite War).
- Digesta, or Pandectae (The Digest).
- Barthold Georg Niebuhr, The History of Rome, Julius Charles Hare and Connop Thirlwall, trans., John Smith, Cambridge (1828).
- Dictionary of Greek and Roman Biography and Mythology, William Smith, ed., Little, Brown and Company, Boston (1849).
- Theodor Mommsen et alii, Corpus Inscriptionum Latinarum (The Body of Latin Inscriptions, abbreviated CIL), Berlin-Brandenburgische Akademie der Wissenschaften (1853–present).
- Notizie degli Scavi di Antichità (News of Excavations from Antiquity, abbreviated NSA), Accademia dei Lincei (1876–present).
- René Cagnat et alii, L'Année épigraphique (The Year in Epigraphy, abbreviated AE), Presses Universitaires de France (1888–present).
- T. Robert S. Broughton, The Magistrates of the Roman Republic, American Philological Association (1952).
