= Corniculum (ancient Latin town) =

Corniculum was an ancient town in Latium in central Italy.

In Rome's early semi-legendary history, the town was part of the Latin League, which went to war with Rome during the reign of Rome's king Lucius Tarquinius Priscus. Corniculum was one of a number of towns captured by Tarquinius.

Livy also records that one of the leading men of Corniculum, named Servius Tullius, was slain in the capture of the town, and that his pregnant wife was taken captive to Rome, but was exempted from slavery by the Roman queen Tanaquil on account of her rank, and was given a place in the king's household. She gave birth to a son, Servius Tullius, who later married Tarqunius' daughter, and succeeded him as king of Rome.
