= Ficulea (ancient Latin town) =

Ficulea was an ancient town in Latium in central Italy.

In Rome's early semi-legendary history, the town was part of the Latin League, which went to war with Rome during the reign of Rome's king Lucius Tarquinius Priscus. Ficulea was one of a number of towns captured by Tarquinius.

Archeological excavations near Ficulea can be documented at least as far back as 1824. In 1856–1857 the Sacra Congregatio de Propaganda Fide carried out archeologically successful excavations there.

Livy calls it Ficulea Vetus. Two important facts only are related of the early history of this city. It was taken by Tarquinius Priscus in 614 B.C., and it joined the Gauls before the battle of Allia. ... In the fifth century the two towns of Nomentum and Ficulea were united into one parish, so that they must have become insignificant by this time. ...
