= Aborigines (mythology) =

Oldest inhabitants of central Italy in Roman mythology

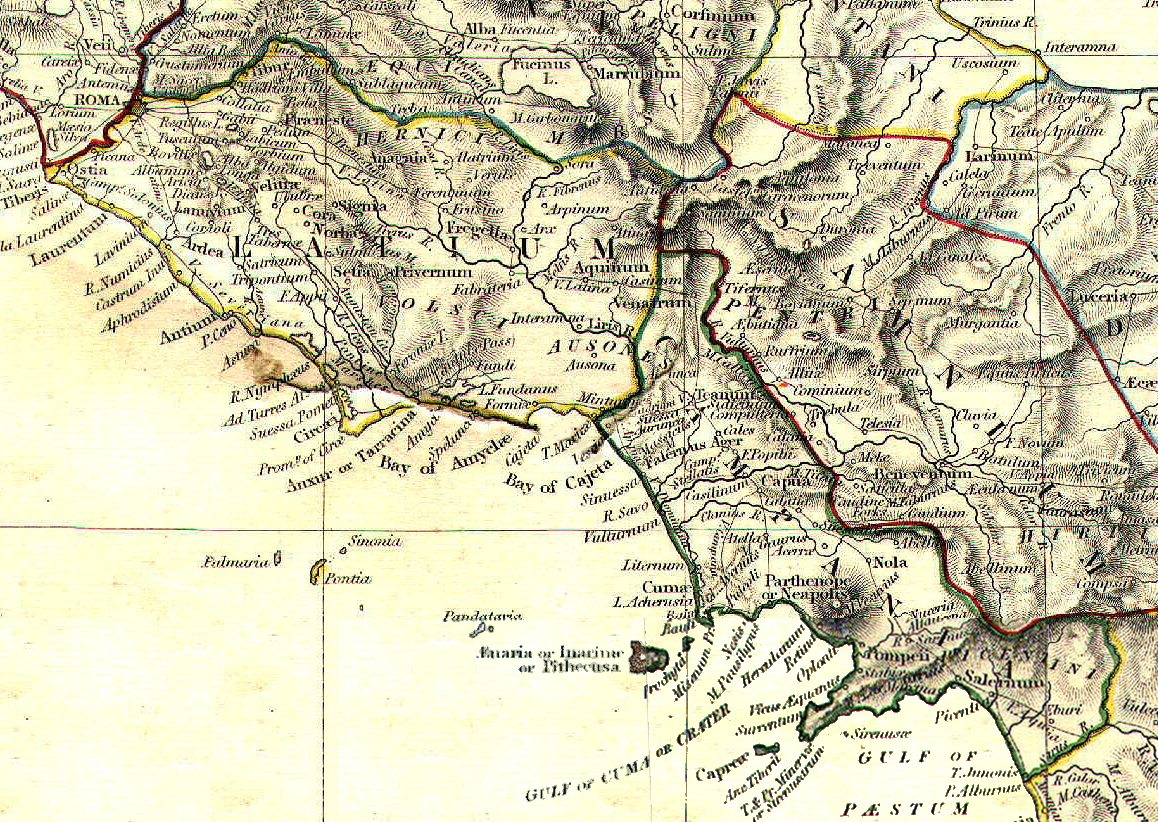
A map of Latium, claimed homeland of the Aborigines.

The Aborigines in Roman mythology are the oldest inhabitants of central Italy, connected in legendary history with Aeneas, Latinus and Evander. They were supposed to have descended from their mountain home near Reate (an ancient Sabine town) upon Latium, where they expelled the Sicels and subsequently settled down as Latini under a King Latinus.

== Etymology ==
The most generally accepted etymology of the Latin word aborigines is that it derives from ab origine, according to which they were the original inhabitants of the country, although Cato the Elder regarded them as Hellenic immigrants, not as a native Italian people. For this reason, scholars have argued that the word actually has a pre-Latin origin, which has been lost, and ab origine is an example of etymological reinterpretation.

Other etymological explanations suggested are arborigines, meaning "tree-born", and aberrigines, meaning "nomads". Lycophron calls a people of central Italy Boreigonoi, meaning "Boreal people".

== Background ==
The Aborigines were possibly descendants of the Pelasgians, the original inhabitants of Greece and surrounding regions, or, more precisely, descendants of the Oenotrians, a tribe descended from Pelasgus by Oenotrus, son of Lycaon, primeval king of Arcadia. Their earliest known home was Reate, an ancient Sabine town to the north-east of Latium near Carseoli. These Aborigines were driven from their mountain home by the Sabines and settled on the river Anio. The Sicels, who inhabited Latium at the time, gave way to the Aborigines, and a portion of them emigrated to Sicily, providing the origin for the island's name. The emigration of the Sicels to Sicily is said to have taken place in either 1264 BC or 1035 BC (Thucydides).

The remaining Siculians joined with the Aborigines eventually becoming the people known as Prisci Latini (meaning old Latins), that is Prisci et Latini, or simply Latini. The Aborigines did not become Latini until the reign of their king, Latinus, from whom the Romans attributed their name. This was after the arrival of the Trojans with Aeneas in the aftermath of the Trojan War.

== Cities ==
The following list is based on Dionysius of Halicarnassus.

- Palatium: 25 stades from Reate.
- Tribula: 60 stades from Reate.
- Suesbula: 60 stades from Tribula, near the Ceraunian Mountains.
- Suna: 40 stades from Suesbula, with an ancient temple of Mars.
- Mefula: about 30 stades from Suna (ruins with walls in Roman times).
- Orvinium: 40 stades from Mefula. Apparently was once a large and famous city in its area with an ancient temple of Minerva.
- Corsula: about 80 stades from Reate, following the Curian Way, a road thought to go through Reate.
- Issa: an island surrounded by a lake, where the Aborigines relied on the marshy waters of the lake for defence.
- Maruvium: Situated near Issa, on an arm of the same lake and distant forty stades from something called the Septem Aquae.
- Batia: 30 stades from Reate.
- Tiora (or Matiene): at a distance of 300 stades from Reate.
- Lista: 24 stades from Tiora, claimed to be the mother-city of the Aborigines, which the Sabines had captured by a surprise attack.
- Cutilia: 70 stades from Reate.

All of these cities are claimed to have been taken from the Umbrians. In Latium itself the Aborigines had the cities Antemnae, Caenina, Ficulnea, Tellenae, and Tibur some of which Dionysius attests were taken from the Siculians.

== See also ==
- Ausones
- Albani people
