= Aulus Vibenna =

Etruscan nobleman of the 6th century BC

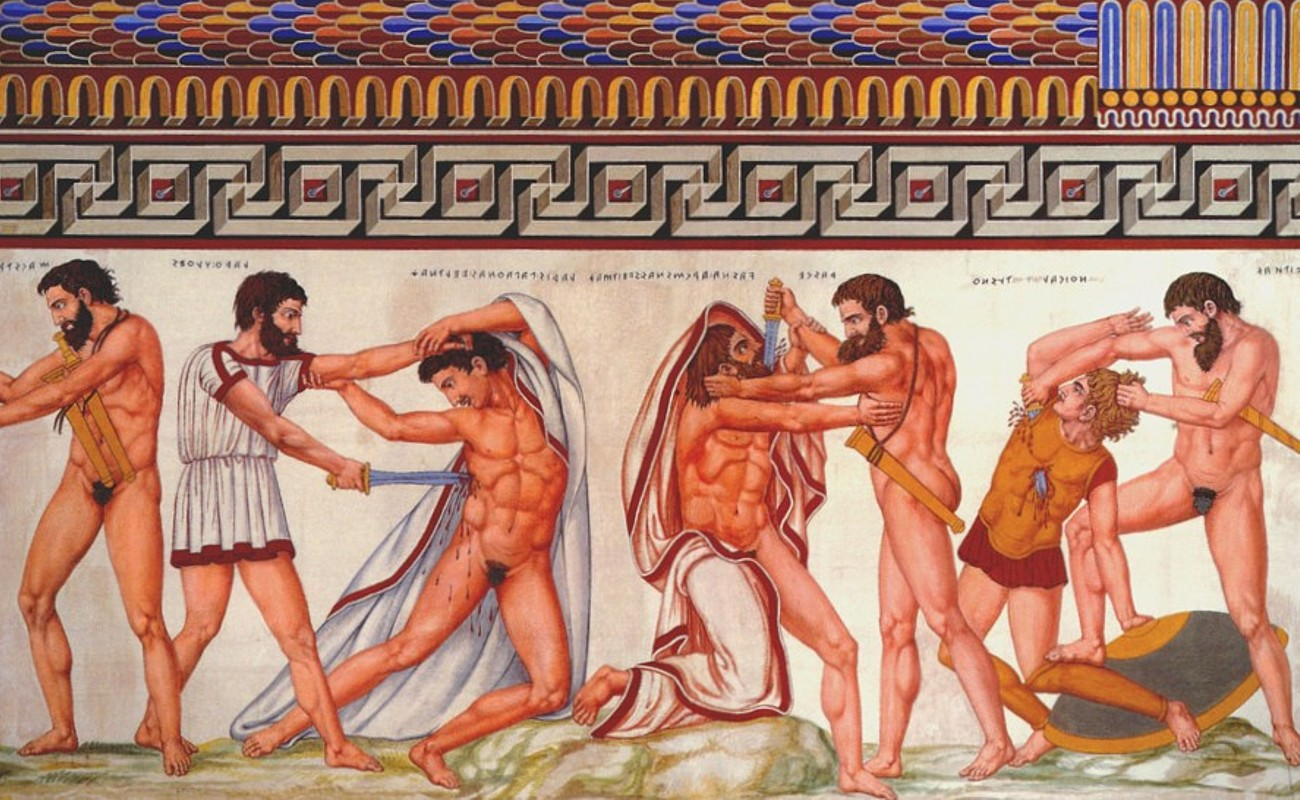
Detail of a facsimile of a fresco in the François Tomb at Vulci coeval with the tomb's discovery, before the fading of the fresco. Aulus Vibenna is the warrior on the far right.

Aulus Vibenna (Etruscan: Avile Vipina) was an Etruscan nobleman from Vulci of the 6th century BC and the brother of Caelius Vibenna (Caile Vipina in Etruscan).

== Biography ==
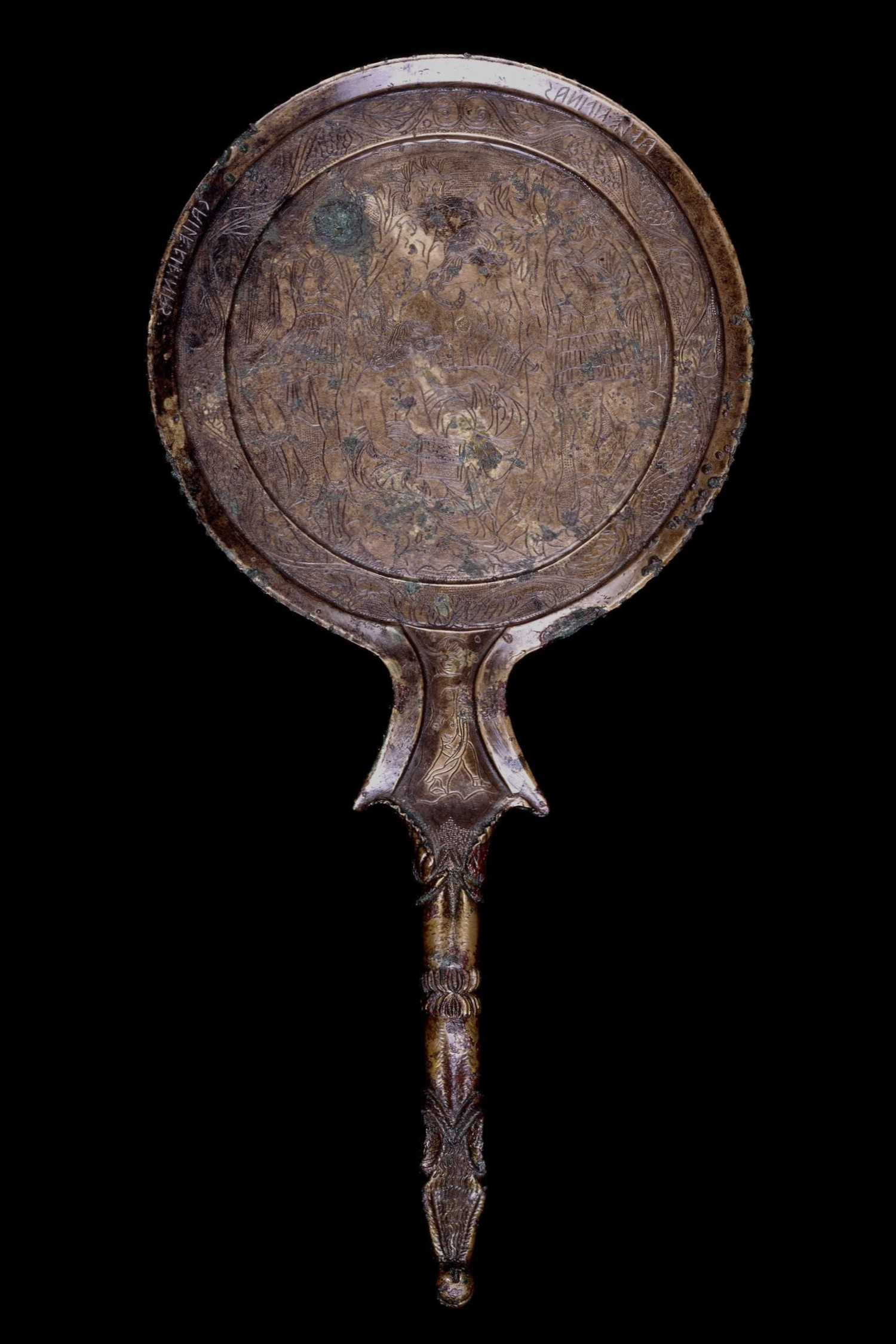
Bronze Mirror from Bolsena with Caile Vipinas, Artile, Cacu and Avle Vipinas

The historical existence of an Aulus Vibenna, citizen of Vulci, is confirmed by archaeological finds, including a cup found at the sanctuary of Portonaccio near Veii, a bucchero chalice (of which only the high cylindrical foot remains from the sanctuary of Portonaccio) from the period in which tradition places it (second quarter or middle of the 6th century BC) and which bears the dedicating inscription mini muluva[an]ece avile vipiienas, i.e. "Aulus Vibenna dedicated me". Aulus, with this gift, had wanted to honour the sanctuary of Veii, whose prestige was such that it attracted as worshipers not only prominent local personalities but also aristocrats from other large Etruscan cities.

Another later vase, a red-figured Etruscan cup preserved in the Rodin Museum in Paris, probably discovered in Vulci and dating from the fifth century BC, bears the Etruscan inscription Avles V(i)pinas naplan, i.e. "cup of Aulus Vibenna", which confirms the charisma of this figure, whose memory resurfaces a century later.

Aulus could have been present in Rome. Arnobius, referring to Fabius Pictor, alludes to the murder of Aulus (whose head would be the one found on the Capitol during excavations for the foundation of the temple of Jupiter), by a "slave of his brother" (Servius Tullius). The Capitol, a pseudo-etymology for which is caput Oli, is said to have taken its name Oli from Auli.

The Vibenna brothers also appear on an Etruscan mirror from Bolsena and on four cinerary urns from Chiusi.

== In the Etruscan tradition ==
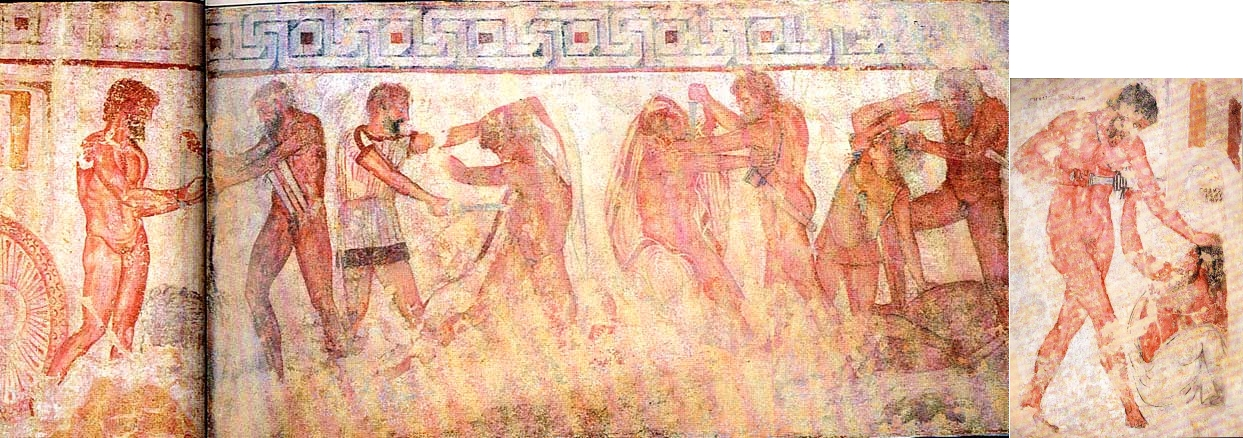
Scene of the liberation of Caelius Vibenna, originally in the François Tomb, detached upon its discovery and transferred to the Torlonia collection at the Villa Albani, Rome. From left to right: Caile Vibenna, Mastarna, Larth Ultes, Laris Papathnas Velznach, Pesna Aremsnas Sveamach, Rasce, Venthikau and Aule Vibenna, right: Marce Camitlnas and Cnaeve Tarchunies Rumach

Aulus and his brother Caelius Vibenna are well represented in the Etruscan tradition.

The François tomb at Vulci contained a fresco showing Aulus and Caelius Vibenna taking part in one of these adventures. The fresco is from the Hellenistic period and incorporates more ancient motifs from the Etruscan tradition.

It represents a battle scene showing Caelius, Aulus Vibenna and Mastarna (the Etruscan name of Servius Tullius) with companions named 'Larth Ulthes', 'Rasce' and 'Marce Camitlnas'. These images show the execution of enemies whose names are 'Laris Papathnas Velznach' (from Volsinii), 'PESNA Arcmsnas Sveamach' (from Sovana), 'Venthical' [...] 'plsachs' and 'Cneve Tarchunies Rumach' (equated to 'Cnaeus Tarquinius of Rome', possibly Lucius Tarquinius Priscus).

The group is portrayed as having taken prisoner Caelius, Aulus, Rasce and Marce, but while they were sleeping, Larth Ulthes broke into their camp, armed with swords which he gave to his companions. While the prisoners kills their captors, Mastarna frees Caelius Vibenna. The fresco, together with the finding of the bucchero, which is coeval with the reign of Servius Tullius, suggests that the Vibenna brothers are historical figures, Etruscan military leaders who took part in the struggles for dominance over Rome, having the Tarquins as their adversaries and helping Servius Tullius oust from power Lucius Tarquinius Priscus. It is not unlikely that Aulus, while being in the surroundings of Rome, decided to make an offer to the sanctuary of Veii, located very close to the city which he wanted to conquer.

== Sources ==
- Pallottino, Massimo (1977). Etruscologia (in Italian) (6 ed.). Milano: Hoepli.
- Dominique Briquel (1997). Le regard des autres : les origines de Rome vues par ses ennemis (in French). Presses Univ. Franche-Comté. ISBN 9782251606231.
