= Tanaquil =

Wife of Tarquin the Elder, the fifth King of Rome

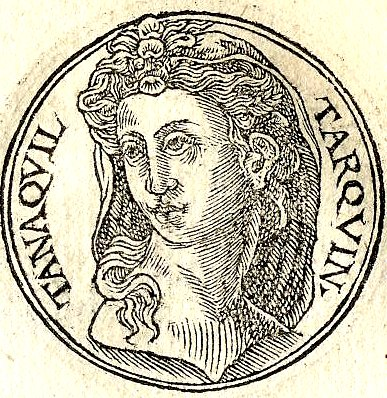
A rendering of Tanaquil, wife of Tarquinius Priscus, fifth king of Rome

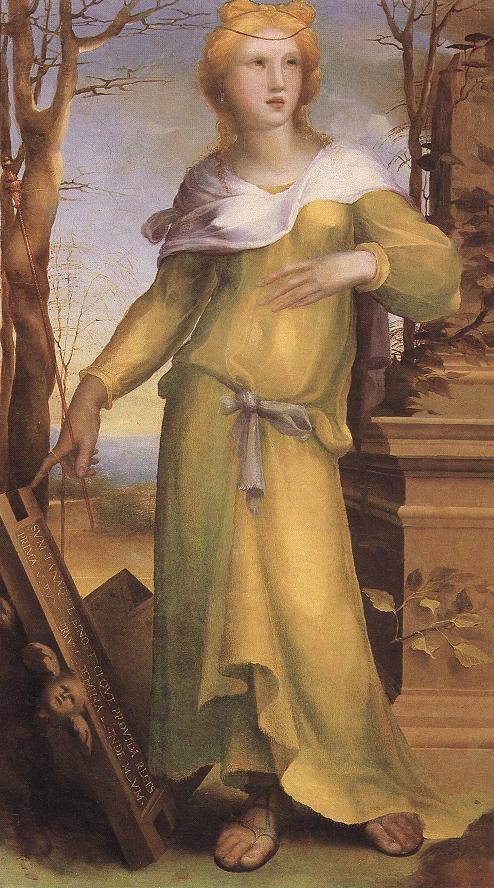
Portrait of Tanaquil by Domenico Beccafumi, c. 1519

Tanaquil (Classical Latin: [ˈtanakʷɪːɫ]; Etruscan: Thanchvil) was the queen consort of Rome by marriage to Tarquinius Priscus, the legendary fifth King of Rome (r. c. 616 – 578 BCE).

== Name ==
The Latin name Tanaquil is a borrowing of an Etruscan female praenomen, attested in inscriptions as θanχvil or θancvil and, in archaic texts, as θanaχvil or θanacvil. The name is well attested in Etruscan funerary inscriptions; one example is the 4th-century BC sarcophagus of Thanchvil Tarnai and her husband Larth Tetnies from Vulci, now in the Museum of Fine Arts, Boston. The shorter forms reflect the loss of unstressed medial vowels (syncope) in Etruscan during the early 5th century BC, so the Latin form, which keeps the second a, continues the older, unsyncopated name. The Latin spelling regularly renders Etruscan θ as t and the cluster χv as qu.

The meaning of the name is uncertain. The linguist Helmut Rix proposed that it combines a base θana- with a noun *aχvil "gift", reconstructed from the votive term tinścvil ("gift to Tinia"), and interpreted the whole as "gift from Θanr", an Etruscan birth goddess. This noun is not directly attested, however, and other scholars, including Rex Wallace, analyze the name differently. In Latin literature the name later became a byword for an imperious wife, as in Juvenal's sixth satire.

== Life ==
The daughter of a powerful Etruscan family in Tarquinii, Etruria, Tanaquil thought her husband would make a good leader, but since he was the son of an immigrant, he would not be able to gain power in Tarquinii, where they lived. Knowing this, Tanaquil encouraged him to move to Rome, which was not at the time dominated by a strong local aristocracy. Her prophetic abilities helped her to install Tarquin as king and later Servius Tullius as the next king. While on the road to Rome, an eagle flew off with Tarquin's hat and then returned it to his head. Tanaquil interpreted this as a sign that the gods wanted him to become a king.

Tanaquil's prophecy was eventually realized for Tarquin—he eventually became friends with King Ancus Marcius, who made Tarquin guardian of his children. When the king died before his children were old enough to become successors to the throne, Tarquin used his popularity in the Comitia to be elected the fifth king of Rome. He ruled from 616 to 579 BC.

She had four children, two daughters and two sons, Lucius Tarquinius Superbus, the seventh and last king of Rome, and Arruns Tarquinius. One of her daughters, Tarquinia, married Servius Tullius after he had succeeded Tarquinius Priscus as king.

Tanaquil played a role in the rise of Servius Tullius, the sixth king of Rome. Raising him as her own child, Tanaquil believed Servius would be the next successor to the throne. Her dreams would be realized when, one day Servius was sleeping and his head was surrounded with flames. The fires danced around his head without hurting him and when Servius awoke, the fire disappeared. Taking this as an omen, Tanaquil knew Servius would one day be king. When Tarquin was assassinated, Tanaquil hid his death from her subjects, instead telling them that Tarquin had been wounded and had himself appointed Servius regent until he got better. After gaining the people's respect and commanding the kingship, Servius and Tanaquil announced Tarquin's death. The Senate named Servius king, and Tanaquil's sons, Lucius and Arruns, married Servius' daughters, the Tulliae.

== Gaia Caecilia ==
In an alternate tradition reported by several Roman chroniclers, Tanaquil changed her name to Gaia Caecilia when she arrived at Rome. Under this name she was regarded as the model of womanly virtue, skilled in the domestic arts, particularly spinning and weaving, and she was associated with the origin of various Roman wedding customs.

Pliny reports that in his day, six hundred years later, her spindle and distaff were preserved in the Temple of Sancus, where stood a bronze statue of the queen, together with a purple tunic she had woven for Servius Tullius, and according to some authorities a belt upon which Tanaquil had placed a number of healing charms, and to which miraculous properties were ascribed. Tanaquil was said to have woven the first tunica recta, the dress traditionally woven by Roman brides for their wedding day, and it was even supposed that the ancient wedding formula recited by the bride and groom, "ubi tu Gaius, ego Gaia" (as you are Gaius, I am Gaia), was a reference to Tanaquil. During the Renaissance, Boccaccio cited Gaia Caecilia (under the name "Gaia Cyrilla") in his De Mulieribus Claris (On Famous Women) as a model of frugality and the simple living style of Roman antiquity.

== See also ==
- Tanaquil (painting)

== Bibliography ==
- Titus Livius (Livy), History of Rome.
- Gaius Plinius Secundus (Pliny the Elder), Historia Naturalis (Natural History).
- Lucius Mestrius Plutarchus (Plutarch), Moralia.
- Sextus Pompeius Festus, Epitome de M. Verrio Flacco de Verborum Significatu (Epitome of Marcus Verrius Flaccus' On the Meaning of Words).
- Lucius Cassius Dio, vol. 1 (Loeb Classical Library, 1914), online.
- Giovanni Boccaccio, Famous Women, Virginia Brown, trans., Harvard University Press, Cambridge and London (2001), ISBN 0-674-01130-9.
- Dictionary of Greek and Roman Biography and Mythology, William Smith, ed., Little, Brown and Company, Boston (1849).
- Diana Bowder, Who was who in the Roman World, Phaidon Press Limited, Oxford (1980).
- Marjorie and Benjamin Lightman, Biographical dictionary of ancient Greek and Roman women: notable women from Sappho to Helena, Facts On File, New York (2000).
- Joyce E. Salisbury, Encyclopedia of women in the ancient world, Abc-Clio, Santa Barbara (2001).
- Ann R. Raia and Judith Lynn Sebesta, The World of State, online (retrieved 9 May 2007).
- "Tanaquil", in Encyclopaedia Britannica, online (retrieved 9 May 2007).
- Karen K. Hersch, "The Woolworker Bride", in Ancient Marriage in Myth and Reality, Lena Larsson Lovén, Agneta Strömberg, eds., Cambridge Scholars Publishing (2010).
