= Servius Tullius =

King of Rome from c. 578 to 535 BC

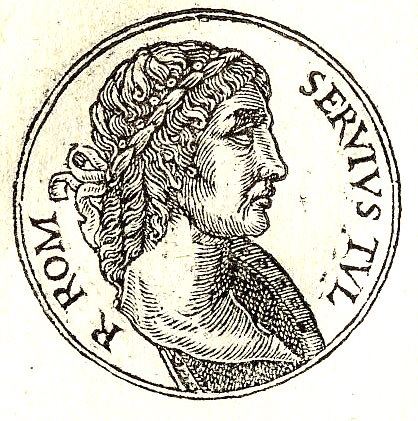
- Portrait from Promptuarium Iconum Insigniorum (1553) by Guillaume Rouillé

King of Rome
- Reign: c. 578–535 BC
- Predecessor: Lucius Tarquinius Priscus
- Successor: Lucius Tarquinius Superbus
- Spouse: Tarquinia (Livy) or Gegania (Plutarch)
- Issue: Tullia
- Father: Uncertain
- Mother: Ocrisia

Servius Tullius was the legendary sixth king of Rome, and the second of its Etruscan dynasty. He reigned from 578 to 535 BC. Roman and Greek sources describe his servile origins and later marriage to a daughter of Lucius Tarquinius Priscus, Rome's first Etruscan king, who was assassinated in 579 BC. The constitutional basis for his accession is unclear; he is variously described as the first Roman king to accede without election by the Senate, having gained the throne by popular and royal support; and as the first to be elected by the Senate alone, with support of the reigning queen but without recourse to a popular vote.

Several traditions describe Servius's father as divine. Livy depicts Servius's mother as a captured Latin princess enslaved by the Romans; her child is chosen as Rome's future king after a ring of fire is seen around his head. The Emperor Claudius discounted such origins and described him as an originally Etruscan mercenary, named Mastarna, who fought for Caelius Vibenna.

Servius was a popular king, and one of Rome's most significant benefactors. He had military successes against Veii and the Etruscans, and expanded the city to include the Quirinal, Viminal and Esquiline hills. He is traditionally credited with the institution of the Compitalia festivals, the building of temples to Fortuna and Diana and, less plausibly, the invention of Rome's first true coinage.

Despite the opposition of Rome's patricians, he expanded the Roman franchise and improved the lot and fortune of Rome's lowest classes of citizens and non-citizens. According to Livy, he reigned for 44 years, until murdered by his daughter Tullia and son-in-law Lucius Tarquinius Superbus. In consequence of this "tragic crime" and his hubristic arrogance as king, Tarquinius was eventually removed. This cleared the way for the abolition of Rome's monarchy and the founding of the Roman Republic, whose groundwork had already been laid by Servius's reforms.

== Background ==
Before its establishment as a Republic, Rome was ruled by kings (Latin reges, singular rex). In Roman tradition, Rome's founder Romulus was the first. Servius Tullius was the sixth, and his successor Tarquinius Superbus (Tarquin the Proud) was the last. The nature of Roman kingship is unclear; most Roman kings were elected by the senate, as to a lifetime magistracy, but some claimed succession through dynastic or divine right. Some were native Romans, others were foreign. Later Romans had a complex ideological relationship with this distant past. In Republican mores and institutions kingship was abhorrent; and remained so, in name at least, during the Empire. On the one hand, Romulus was held to have brought Rome into being more-or-less at a stroke, so complete and purely Roman in its essentials that any acceptable change or reform thereafter must be clothed as restoration. On the other, Romans of the Republic and Empire saw each king as contributing in some distinctive and novel way to the city's fabric and territories, or its social, military, religious, legal or political institutions. Servius Tullius has been described as Rome's "second founder", "the most complex and enigmatic" of all its kings, and a kind of "proto-Republican magistrate".

=== Ancient sources ===
The oldest surviving source for the overall political developments of the Roman kingdom and Republic is Cicero's De republica ("On the State"), written in 44 BC. The main literary sources for Servius's life and achievements are the Roman historian Livy (59 BC – AD 17), whose Ab urbe condita was generally accepted by the Romans as the standard, most authoritative account; Livy's near contemporary Dionysius of Halicarnassus, and Plutarch (c. 46 – 120 AD); their own sources included works by Quintus Fabius Pictor, Diocles of Peparethus, Quintus Ennius and Cato the Elder. Livy's sources probably included at least some official state records, he excluded what seemed implausible or contradictory traditions, and arranged his material within an overarching chronology. Dionysius and Plutarch offer various alternatives not found in Livy, and Livy's own pupil, the etruscologist, historian and emperor Claudius, offered yet another, based on Etruscan tradition.

== Origins ==
=== Parentage and birth ===
Most Roman sources name Servius's mother as Ocrisia, a young noblewoman taken at the Roman siege of Corniculum and brought to Rome, either pregnant by her husband, who was killed at the siege: or as a virgin. She was given to Tanaquil, wife of king Tarquinius, and though slave, was treated with the respect due her former status. In one variant, she became wife to a noble client of Tarquinius. In others, she served the domestic rites of the royal hearth as a Vestal Virgin, and on one such occasion, having damped the hearth flames with a sacrificial offering, she was penetrated and impregnated by a disembodied phallus that rose from the hearth. According to Tanaquil, this was a divine manifestation, either of the household Lar or Vulcan himself. Thus Servius was divinely fathered and already destined for greatness, despite his mother's servile status; for the time being, Tanaquil and Ocrisia kept this a secret.

=== Early life ===
Servius's birth to a slave of the royal household would have made him a member of Tarquin's extended domestic familia, and a slave himself. Livy describes Servius as a youth already holding an honourable position, as son of a living, noble mother and noble father. He is singled out for special favour when members of the royal household witness a nimbus of fire about his head while he sleeps, a sign of divine favour, and a great portent. In Livy's version, Servius becomes a protégé of the royal family ("like a son") through this event, and later marries their daughter Tarquinia. For Livy, this marriage undermines the traditional narrative in which Ocrisia, and thus her son Servius, are household slaves; Livy asserts that no slave, nor any of slave descent, could have been granted the great honour of marriage into Rome's ruling family.

Servius proves a loyal, responsible son-in-law. When given governmental and military responsibilities, he excels in both. Plutarch, citing Valerius Antias "and his school", names Servius's wife as Gegania: the nimbus of fire appears around the sleeping Servius much later, when Gegania is dying; "a token of his birth from fire".

== Reign ==
In Livy's account, Tarquinius Priscus had been elected king on the death of the previous king, Ancus Marcius, whose two sons were too young to inherit or offer themselves for election. When Servius's popularity and his marriage to Tarquinius's daughter made him a likely successor to the throne, these sons attempted to seize the throne for themselves. They hired two assassins, who attacked and severely wounded Tarquinius. Tanaquil immediately ordered the palace to be shut, and publicly announced from a palace window that Tarquinius had appointed Servius as regent; meanwhile, Tarquinius died of his wounds. When his death became public knowledge, the senate elected Servius as king, and the sons of Ancus fled to exile in Suessa Pometia. Livy describes this as the first occasion that the people of Rome were not involved in the election of the king. In Plutarch, Servius reluctantly consented to the kingship at the death-bed insistence of Tanaquil.

Early in his reign, Servius warred against Veii and the Etruscans. He is said to have shown valour in the campaign, and to have routed a great army of the enemy. His success helped him to cement his position at Rome. According to the Fasti Triumphales, Servius celebrated three triumphs over the Etruscans, including on 25 November 571 BC and 25 May 567 BC (the date of the third triumph is not legible on the Fasti).

=== Servian reforms ===
Most of the reforms credited to Servius extended voting rights to certain groups – in particular to Rome's citizen-commoners (known in the Republican era as plebs), minor landholders previously disqualified from voting by ancestry, status or ethnicity. The same reforms simultaneously defined the fiscal and military obligations of all Roman citizens. As a whole, the so-called Servian reforms probably represent a long-drawn, complex and piecemeal process of populist policy and reform, extending from Servius's predecessors, Ancus Marcius and Tarquinius Priscus, to his successor Tarquinius Superbus, and into the Middle and Late Republic. Rome's military and territorial expansion and consequent changes in its population would have made franchise regulation and reform an ongoing necessity, and their wholesale attribution to Servius "cannot be taken at face value".

==== Curiate reform and census ====
Until the Servian reforms, the passing of laws and judgment was the prerogative of the comitia curiata (curiate assembly), made up from thirty curiae; Roman sources describe ten curiae for each of three aristocratic tribes or clans, each supposedly based on one of Rome's central hills, and claiming patrician status by virtue of their descent from Rome's founding families. These tribes comprised approximately 200 gentes (clans), each of which contributed one senator ("elder") to the Senate. The senate advised the king, devised laws in his name, and was held to represent the entire populus Romanus (Roman people); but it could only debate and discuss. Its decisions had no force unless approved by the comitia curiata. By the time of Servius, if not long before, the tribes of the comitia were a minority of the population, ruling a multitude who had no effective voice in their own government.

Rome's far more populous citizen-commoners could participate in this assembly in limited fashion, and perhaps offer their opinions on decisions but only the comitia curiata could vote. A minority thus exercised power and control over the majority. Roman tradition held that Servius formed a comitia centuriata of commoners to displace the comitia curiata as Rome's central legislative body. This required his development of the first Roman census, making Servius the first Roman censor. For the purposes of the census, citizens assembled by tribe in the Campus Martius to register their social rank, household, property and income. This established an individual's tax obligations, his ability to muster arms for military service when required to do so, and his assignment to a particular voting bloc.

The institution of the census and the comitia centuriata are speculated as Servius's attempt to erode the civil and military power of the Roman aristocracy, and seek the direct support of his newly enfranchised citizenry in civil matters; if necessary, under arms. The comitia curiata continued to function through the Regal and Republican eras, but the Servian reform had reduced its powers to those of a largely symbolic "upper house"; its noble members were expected to do no more than ratify decisions of the comitia centuriata.

==== Classes ====
The census grouped Rome's male citizen population in classes, according to status, wealth and age. Each class was subdivided into groups called centuriae (centuries), nominally of 100 men (Latin centum = 100) but in practice of variable number, further divided as seniores (men aged 46 – 60, of a suitable age to serve as "home guards" or city police) and iuniores (men aged 17 – 45, to serve as front–line troops when required). Adult male citizens were obliged, when called upon, to fulfill military service according to their means, which was supposedly assessed in archaic asses. A citizen's wealth and class would, therefore, have defined their position in the civil hierarchies, and up to a point, within the military; but despite its apparent military character, and its possible origins as the mustering of the citizenry-at-arms, the system would have primarily served to determine the voting qualifications and wealth of individual citizens for taxation purposes, and the weight of their vote – wars were occasional but taxation was a constant necessity – and the comitia centuriata met whenever required to do so, in peace or war. Though each century had voting rights, the wealthiest had the most centuries, and voted first. Those beneath them were convened only in the event of deadlock or indecision; the lowest class was unlikely to vote at all.

The Roman army's centuria system and its order of battle are thought to be based on the civilian classifications established by the census. The military selection process picked men from civilian centuriae and slipped them into military ones. Their function depended on their age, experience, and the equipment they could afford. The wealthiest class of iuniores (aged 17–45) were armed as hoplites, heavy infantry with helmet, greaves, breastplate, shields (clipeus), and spears (hastae). Each battle line in the phalanx formation was composed of a single class. Military specialists, such as trumpeters, were chosen from the 5th class. The highest officers were of aristocratic origin until the early Republic, when the first plebeian tribunes were elected by the plebeians from their own number. Cornell suggests that this centuriate system made the equites, who "consisted mainly, if not exclusively, of patricians" but voted after infantry of the first class, subordinate to the relatively low-status infantry.

=== Tribal and boundary expansions ===
The Servian reforms increased the number of tribes and expanded the city, which was protected by a new rampart, moat and wall. The enclosed area was divided into four administrative regiones (regions, or quarters); the Suburana, Esquilana, Collina and Palatina. Servius himself is said to have taken a new residence, on the Esquiline. The situation beyond the walls is unclear, but thereafter, membership of a Roman voting-tribe would have depended on residence rather than kinship, ancestry and inheritance. This would have brought significant numbers of urban and rural plebs into active political life; and a significant number of these would have been allocated to centuries of the first class, and therefore likely to vote. The city of Rome's division into "quarters" remained in use until 7 BC, when Augustus divided the city into 14 new regiones. In modern Rome, an ancient portion of surviving wall is attributed to Servius, the remainder supposedly being rebuilt after the sack of Rome in 390/387 BC by the Gauls.

=== Economy ===
Some Roman historians believed Servius Tullius responsible for Rome's earliest true, minted coinage, replacing an earlier and less convenient currency of raw bullion. This is unlikely, though he may have introduced the official stamping of raw currency. Money played a minimal role in the Roman economy, which was almost entirely agrarian at this time. Debt and debt bondage, however, were probably rife. The form of such debts would have had little resemblance to those of cash-debtors, compelled to pay interest to money-lenders on an advance of capital. Rather, wealthy landowners would make an "advance loan" of seed, foodstuffs or other essentials to tenants, clients and smallholders, in return for a promise of labour services or a substantial share of the crop. The terms of such "loans" compelled defaulters to sell themselves, or their dependants, to their creditor; or, if smallholders, to surrender their farm. Wealthy aristocratic landholders thus acquired additional farms and service for very little outlay. Dionysius claims that Servius paid such debts "from his own purse", and forbade voluntary and compulsory debt bondage. In reality, these practices persisted well into the Republican era. Livy describes the distribution of land grants to poor and landless citizens by Servius and others as the political pursuit of popular support from citizens of little merit or worth.

=== Religion ===
Servius is credited with the construction of Diana's temple on the Aventine Hill, to mark the foundation of the so-called Latin League; His servile birth-mythos, his populist leanings and his reorganisation of the vici appear to justify the Roman belief that he founded or reformed the Compitalia festivals (held to celebrate the Lares that watched over each local community), or allowed for the first time their attendance and service by non-citizens and slaves. His personal reputation and achievements may have led to his historical association with temples and shrines to Fortuna; some sources suggest that the two were connected during Servius's lifetime, via some form of "sacred marriage". Plutarch explicitly identifies the Porta Fenestella ("window gate") of the Royal palace as the window from which Tanaquil announced Servius's regency to the people; the goddess Fortuna was said to have passed through the same window, to become Servius's consort.

=== Assassination ===
In Livy's history, Servius Tullius had two daughters, Tullia the Elder and Tullia the Younger. He arranged their marriage to the two sons of his predecessor, Lucius Tarquinius and Arruns Tarquinius. The younger Tullia and Lucius procured the murders of their respective siblings, married, and conspired to remove Servius Tullius. Tullia Minor encouraged Lucius Tarquinius to secretly persuade or bribe senators, and Tarquinius went to the senate-house with a group of armed men. Then he summoned the senators and gave a speech criticising Servius: for being a slave born of a slave; for failing to be elected by the Senate and the people during an interregnum, as had been the tradition for the election of kings of Rome; for being gifted the throne by a woman; for favouring the lower classes of Rome over the wealthy; for taking the land of the upper classes for distribution to the poor; and for instituting the census, which exposed the wealthy upper classes to popular envy.

When Servius Tullius arrived at the senate-house to defend his position, Tarquinius threw him down the steps and Servius was murdered in the street by Tarquin's men. Soon after, Tullia drove her chariot over her father's body. For Livy, Tarquinius's impious refusal to permit his father-in-law's burial earned him the sobriquet Superbus (“arrogant” or “proud”), and Servius's death is a "tragic crime" (tragicum scelus), a dark episode in Rome's history and just cause for the abolition of the monarchy. Servius thus becomes the last of Rome's benevolent kings; the place of this outrage – which Livy seems to suggest as a crossroads – is known thereafter as Vicus Sceleratus (street of shame, infamy or crime). His murder is parricide, the worst of all crimes. This morally justifies Tarquin's eventual expulsion and the abolition of Rome's aberrant, "un-Roman" monarchy. Livy's Republic is partly founded on the achievements and death of Rome's last benevolent king.

== Historical appraisals ==
=== Birth ===
Claims of divine ancestry and divine favour were often attached to charismatic individuals who rose "as if from nowhere" to become dynasts, tyrants and hero-founders in the ancient Mediterranean world. Yet all these legends offer the father as divine, the mother – virgin or not – as princess of a ruling house, never as slave. The disembodied phallus and its impregnation of a virgin slave of Royal birth are unique to Servius. Livy and Dionysius ignore or reject the tales of Servius's supernatural virgin birth; though his parents came from a conquered people, both are of noble stock. His ancestry is an accident of fate, and his character and virtues are entirely Roman. He acts on behalf of the Roman people, not for personal gain; these Roman virtues are likely to find favour with the gods, and win the rewards of good fortune.

The details of Servius's servile birth, miraculous conception and links with divine Fortuna were doubtless embellished after his own time, but the core may have been propagated during his reign. His unconstitutional and seemingly reluctant accession, and his direct appeal to the Roman masses over the heads of the senate may have been interpreted as signs of tyranny. Under these circumstances, an extraordinary personal charisma must have been central to his success. When Servius expanded Rome's influence and boundaries, and reorganised its citizenship and armies, his "new Rome" was still centered on the Comitium, the Casa Romuli or "hut" of Romulus. Servius became a second Romulus, a benefactor to his people, part human, part divine; but his slave origins remain without parallel, and make him all the more remarkable: for Cornell, this is "the most important single fact about him". The story of his servile birth evidently circulated far beyond Rome; Mithridates VI of Pontus sneered that Rome had made kings of servos vernasque Tuscorum (Etruscan slaves and domestic servants).

=== Etruscan Servius ===
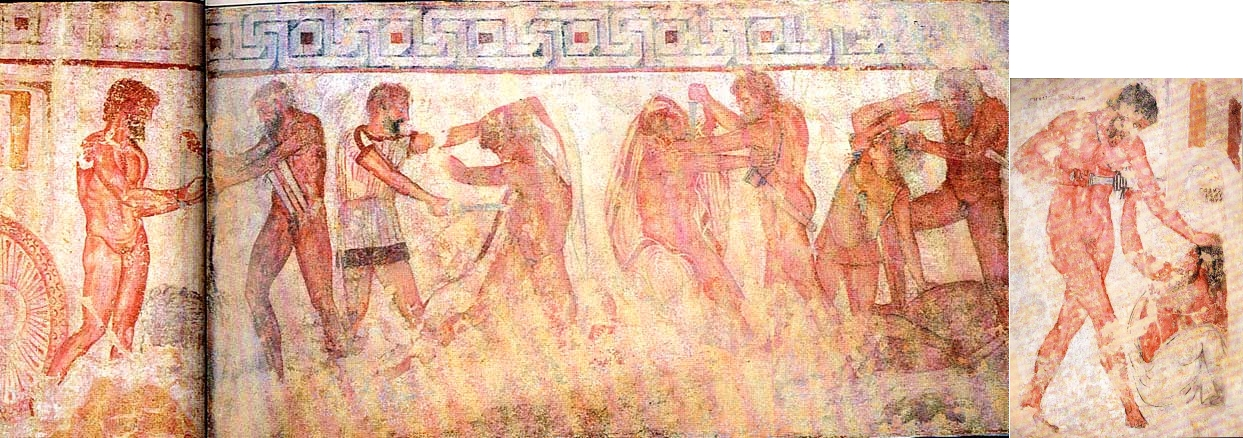
Painting from the François Tomb at Vulci, depicting the liberation of Caelius Vibenna. Macstarna is second from left

Claudius's story of Servius as an Etruscan named Macstarna (title for "dictator" in Etruscan) was published as an incidental scholarly comment within the Oratio Claudii Caesaris of the Lugdunum Tablet. There is some support for this Etruscan version of Servius, in wall paintings at the François Tomb in Etruscan Vulci. They were commissioned some time in the second half of the 4th century BC. One panel shows heroic Etruscans putting foreign captives to the sword. The victims include an individual named Gneve Tarchunies Rumach, interpreted as a Roman named Gnaeus Tarquinius, although known Roman history records no Tarquinius of that praenomen. The victors include Aule and Caile Vipinas – known to the Romans as the Vibenna brothers – and their ally Macstrna [Macstarna], who seems instrumental in winning the day. Claudius was certain that Macstarna was simply another name for Servius Tullius, who started his career as an Etruscan ally of the Vibenna brothers and helped them settle Rome's Caelian Hill. Claudius's account evidently drew on sources unavailable to his fellow-historians, or rejected by them. There may have been two different, Servius-like figures, or two different traditions about the same figure. Macstarna may have been the name of a once celebrated Etruscan hero, or more speculatively, an Etruscan rendering of Roman magister (magistrate). Claudius's "Etruscan Servius" seems less a monarch than a freelance Roman magister, an "archaic condottiere" who placed himself and his own band of armed clients at Vibenna's service, and may later have seized, rather than settled Rome's Caelian Hill. If the Etruscan Macstarna was identical with the Roman Servius, the latter may have been less monarch than some kind of proto-Republican magistrate given permanent office, perhaps a magister populi, a war-leader, or in Republican parlance, a dictator.

=== Legacy ===
Servius's political reforms and those of his successor Tarquinius Superbus undermined the bases of aristocratic power and transferred them in part to commoners. Rome's ordinary citizens became a distinct force within Roman politics, entitled to participate in government and bear arms on its behalf, despite the opposition and resentment of Rome's patricians and senate. Tarquinius was ousted by a conspiracy of patricians, not plebeians. Once in existence, the comitia centuriata could not be unmade, or its powers reduced: as Republican Rome's highest court of appeal, it had the capacity to overturn court decisions, and the Republican senate was constitutionally obliged to seek its approval. In time, the comitia centuriata legitimized the rise to power of a plebeian nobility, and plebeian consuls.

Servius's connections to the Lar and his reform of the vici connect him directly to the founding of Compitalia, instituted to publicly and piously honour his divine parentage – assuming the Lar as his father – to extend his domestic rites into the broader community, to mark his maternal identification with the lower ranks of Roman society and to assert his regal sponsorship and guardianship of their rights. Some time before the Augustan Compitalia reforms of 7 BC, Dionysius of Halicarnassus reports Servius's fathering by a Lar and his founding of Compitalia as ancient Roman traditions. In Servius, Augustus found ready association with a popular benefactor and refounder of Rome, whose reluctance to adopt kingship distanced him from its taints. Augustus brought the Compitalia and its essentially plebeian festivals, customs and political factions under his patronage and if need be, his censorial powers. He did not, however, trace his lineage and his re-founding to Servius – who even with part-divine ancestry still had servile connections – but with Romulus, patrician founding hero, ancestor of the divine Julius Caesar, descendant of Venus and Mars. Plutarch admires the Servian reforms for their imposition of good order in government, the military and public morality, and Servius himself as the wisest, most fortunate and best of all Rome's kings.

== See also ==
- Servio Tullio, a 1686 libretto by Agostino Steffani

== Bibliography ==
- Beard, M., Price, S., North, J., Religions of Rome: Volume 1, a History, illustrated, Cambridge University Press, 1998. ISBN 0-521-31682-0
- Cornell, T., The beginnings of Rome: Italy and Rome from the Bronze Age to the Punic Wars (c. 1000 – 264 BC), Routledge, 1995. ISBN 978-0-415-01596-7
- Grandazzi, Alexandre, The foundation of Rome: myth and history, Cornell University Press, 1997, ISBN 978-0-8014-8247-2
- Lendon, J.E., Soldiers & Ghosts: A History of Battle in Classical Antiquity, Yale University Press (2005), ISBN 978-0-300-11979-4

Legendary titles
Preceded by Lucius Tarquinius Priscus	King of Rome; 578–535	Succeeded by Lucius Tarquinius Superbus
