= Ameriola =

Ameriola was an ancient town in Latium in central Italy.

According to Livy, the town was part of the Latin League, which went to war with Rome during the reign of Rome's king Lucius Tarquinius Priscus. Ameriola was one of a number of towns captured by Tarquinius.
