= King of Rome =

Chief magistrate of the Roman Kingdom

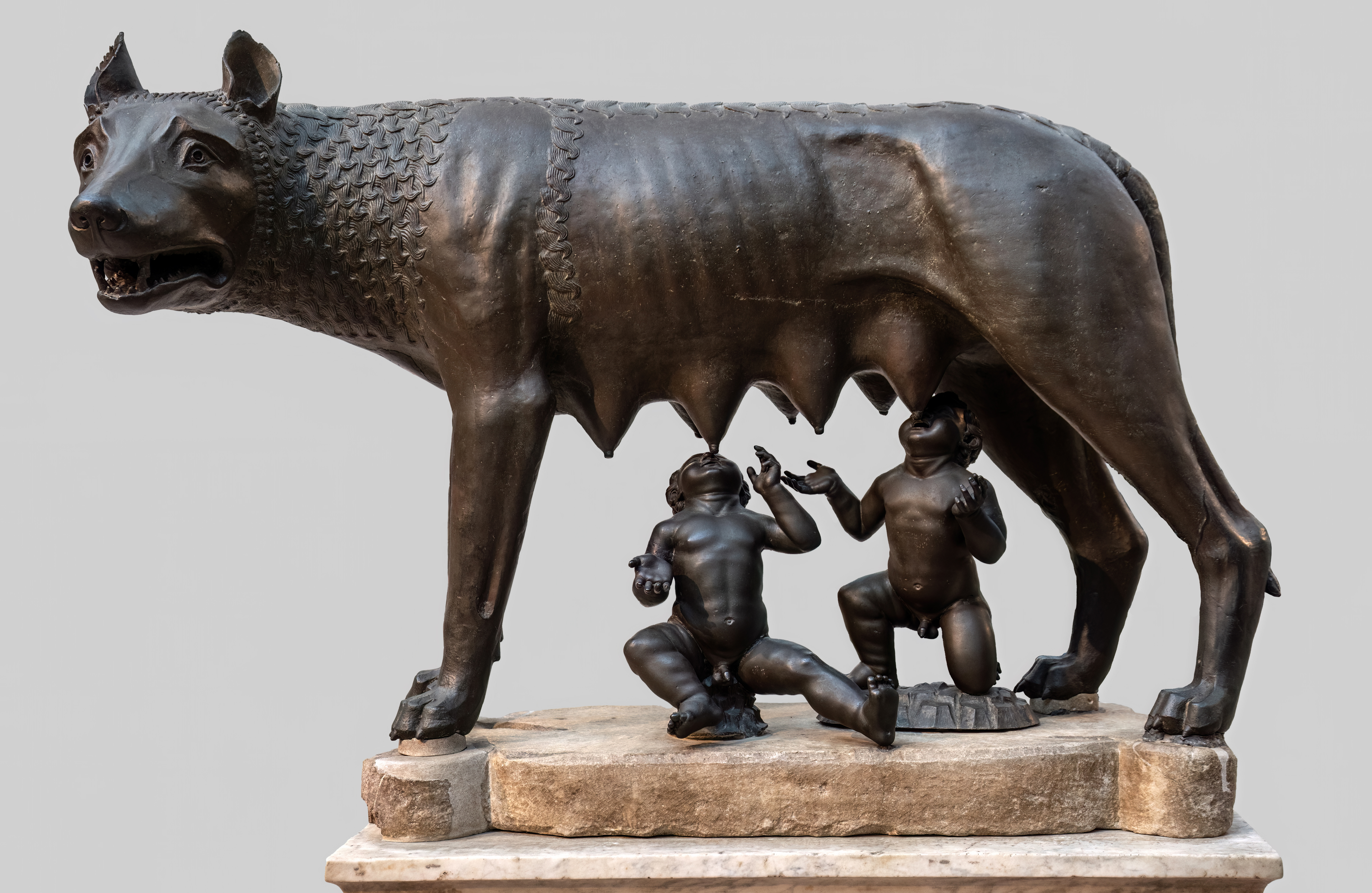
- Capitoline Wolf

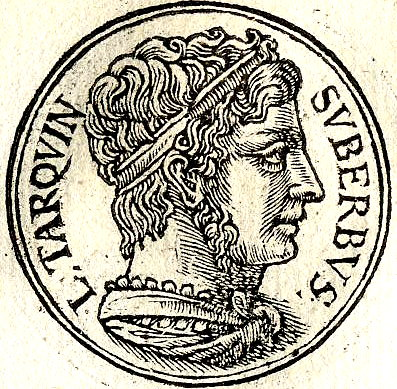
- Last to reign Lucius Tarquinius Superbus c. 534 – 509 BC

Details
- First monarch: Romulus
- Last monarch: Lucius Tarquinius Superbus
- Formed: 753 BC
- Abolished: 509 BC
- Residence: Rome
- Appointer: Curiate Assembly

The king of Rome (Latin: Rex Romanus) was the ruler of the Roman Kingdom, a legendary period of Roman history that functioned as an elective monarchy. According to legend, the first king of Rome was Romulus, who founded the city in 753 BC upon the Palatine Hill. Seven legendary kings are said to have ruled Rome until 509 BC, when the last king, Lucius Tarquinius Superbus, was overthrown. These kings ruled for an average of 35 years.

The kings after Romulus were not known to be dynasts and no reference is made to the hereditary principle until after the fifth king Tarquinius Priscus. Consequently, some have assumed that the Tarquins' attempt to institute a hereditary monarchy over this conjectured earlier elective monarchy resulted in the formation of the Republic.

== Overview ==
Early Rome was ruled by the king (rex). The king possessed absolute power over the people; no one could rule over him. The Senate was a weak oligarchy, capable of exercising only minor administrative powers, so that Rome was ruled almost entirely by its king, who was in effect an absolute monarch. The Senate's main function was to carry out and administer the wishes of the king. After Romulus, Rome's legendary first king, Roman kings were elected by the people of Rome, sitting as a Curiate Assembly, who voted on the candidate that had been nominated by a chosen member of the Senate called an interrex. Candidates for the throne could be chosen from any source. For example, one such candidate, Lucius Tarquinius Priscus, was originally a citizen and migrant from a neighboring Etruscan city-state. The people of Rome, sitting as the Curiate Assembly, could then either accept or reject the nominated candidate-king.

The king had twelve lictors wielding fasces, a curule chair which served as a throne, a purple toga picta, red shoes, and a white diadem worn on the head. Only the king could wear a purple toga.

The supreme power of the state was vested in the king, whose position gave the following powers:

=== Chief Executive ===
Beyond his religious authority, the king was invested with the supreme military, executive, and judicial authority through the use of imperium. The imperium of the king was held for life and protected him from ever being brought to trial for his actions. As the sole holder of imperium in Rome at the time, the king possessed ultimate executive power and unchecked military authority as the commander-in-chief of all Rome's forces. His executive power and his sole imperium allowed him to issue decrees with the force of law. Also, the laws that kept citizens safe from the misuse of magistrates holding imperium did not exist during the time of the kings.

The king was also empowered to appoint or nominate all officeholders. He would appoint a tribunus celerum to serve both as the tribune of Ramnes tribe in Rome and also as the commander of the king's personal bodyguard, the Celeres. The king was required to appoint the tribune upon entering office, and the tribune left office upon the king's death. The tribune was second in rank to the king and also possessed the power to convene the Curiate Assembly and lay legislation before it.

Another officer appointed by the king was the custos urbis, who acted as the warden of the city. When the king was absent from the city, the prefect held all of the king's powers, even to the point of being bestowed with imperium while inside the city. The king was the sole person empowered to appoint patricians to the Senate.

=== Chief Judge ===
The king's imperium both granted him military powers and qualified him to pronounce legal judgement in all cases as the chief justice of Rome. Although he could assign pontiffs to act as minor judges in some cases, he had supreme authority in all cases brought before him, both civil and criminal. This made the king supreme in times of both war and peace. While some writers believed there was no appeal from the king's decisions, others believed that a proposal for appeal could be brought before the king by any patrician during a meeting of the Curiate Assembly.

To assist the king, a council advised the king during all trials, but this council had no power to control the king's decisions. Also, two criminal detectives (Quaestores Parricidii) were appointed by him as well as a two-man criminal court (Duumviri Perduellionis) which oversaw for cases of treason.

=== Chief Legislator ===
Under the kings, the Senate and Curiate Assembly had very little power and authority; they were not independent bodies in that they possessed the right to meet together and discuss questions of state. They could only be called together by the king and could only discuss the matters the king laid before them. While the Curiate Assembly did have the power to pass laws that the king had submitted, the Senate was effectively an honorable council. It could advise the king on his action but, by no means, could prevent him from acting. The only thing that the king could not do without the approval of the Senate and Curiate Assembly was to declare war against a foreign nation. These issues effectively allowed the King to more or less rule by decree with the exception of the above-mentioned affairs.

== Election ==
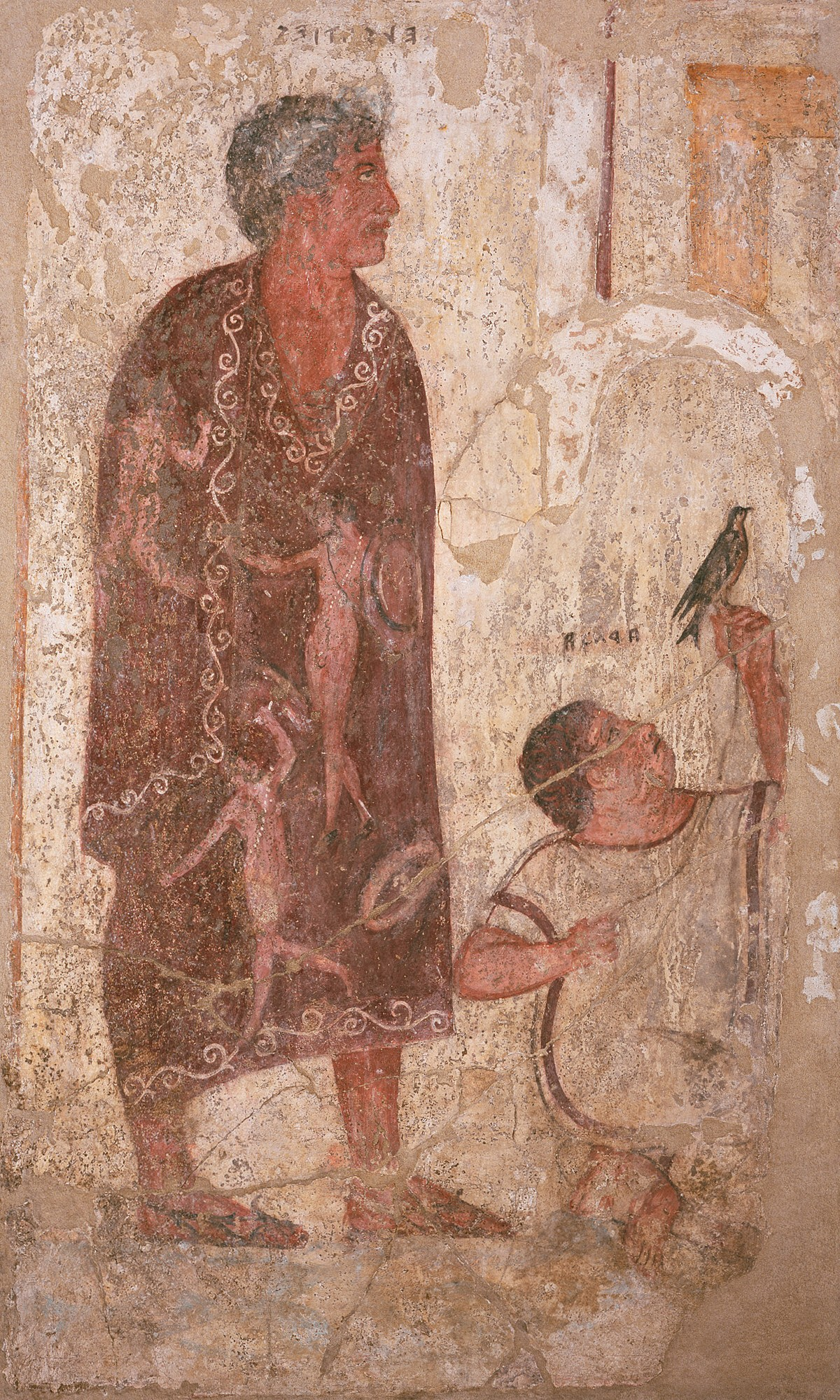
François Tomb painting, showing the type of clothes (toga picta) Roman kings would've most likely worn, at least the ones from the Etruscan dynasty; others suggest that the straight edges make it a Greek-style cloak, and not a toga

Whenever a Roman king died, Rome entered a period of interregnum. The supreme power in the state would be devolved to the Senate, which had the task of finding a new king. The Senate would assemble and appoint one of its own members as the interrex to serve for five days to nominate the next king of Rome. After the five days, the interrex could appoint (with the Senate's consent) another senator for another five-day term. This process would continue until the election of a new king. Once the interrex found a suitable nominee for the kingship, he would bring the nominee before the Senate and the Senate would examine him. If the Senate confirmed the nomination, the interrex would convene the Curiate Assembly and preside as its chairman during the election of the king.

Once a candidate was proposed to the Curiate Assembly, the people of Rome could either accept or reject the King-elect. If accepted, the King-elect did not immediately take office: two additional acts had to take place before he was invested with the full regal authority and power. First, it was necessary to obtain the divine will of the gods respecting his appointment by means of the auspices, since the king would serve as high priest of Rome. An augur performed this ceremony by conducting the King-elect to the citadel where he was placed on a stone seat as the people waited below. If the King-elect was found worthy of the kingship, the augur announced that the gods had given favourable tokens, thus confirming the King-elect's priestly character. Second, the imperium had to be conferred upon the King. The Curiate Assembly's vote only determined who was to be king, but that act did not bestow the powers of the king upon him. Accordingly, the king himself proposed to the Curiate Assembly a bill granting him imperium, and the Curiate Assembly, by voting in favour of the law, would grant it.

In theory, the people of Rome elected their leader, but the Senate had most of the control over the process.

== Kings of Rome (753–509 BC) ==
Since Rome's records were destroyed in 390 BC when the city was sacked, it is impossible to know for certain how many kings actually ruled the city, or if any of the deeds attributed to the individual kings, by later writers, are historically accurate.

Titus Tatius, King of the Sabines, was also coruler of Rome with Romulus for five years, until his death. However, he is not traditionally counted among the seven kings of Rome.

Name	Birth	Reign	Succession
Romulus	c. 770 BC	c. 753 – 716 BC (37 years)	Proclaimed himself king after murdering his brother, Remus.
Numa Pompilius	c. 753 BC	c. 715 – 672 BC (43 years)	Elected king by the Curiate Assembly, after the death of Romulus.
Tullus Hostilius	???	c. 672 – 640 BC (32 years)	Elected king by the Curiate Assembly, after the death of Numa Pompilius.
Ancus Marcius	???	c. 640 – 616 BC (24 years)	Son in law of Tullus Hostilius, grandson of Numa Pompilius; five years old at the time of his grandfather's death, he was elected king by the Curiate Assembly after the death of Tullus Hostilius.
Lucius Tarquinius Priscus	???	c. 616 – 578 BC (38 years)	After the death of Ancus Marcius, he became regent due to Marcius' sons being too young, but was soon elected king by the Curiate Assembly. He was the first Etruscan king, and was originally known as Lucumo.
Servius Tullius	???	c. 578 – 534 BC (44 years)	Son in law of Lucius Tarquinius Priscus. He seized the kingship after Ancus' sons had Tarquinius Priscus assassinated under the guise that he was merely filling in while the king was recovering.
Lucius Tarquinius Superbus	???	c. 534 – 509 BC (25 years)	Son or grandson of Lucius Tarquinius Priscus; seized the kingship after the assassination of Servius Tullius which he and his wife (daughter of Tullius) helped orchestrate.

== Royal symbols ==
Tarquinius Priscus and his wife Tanaquil introduced Etruscan royal symbols in Rome. These symbols persisted in the Republic and Empire, becoming Roman symbols.

These royal symbols were:

- Fasces: symbol of State power
- Sella curulis: the throne, later becoming the chair of high-rank magistrates
- Scepter crowned by an eagle: animal symbol of the Etruscan god Tinia (Jupiter for Romans)
- Laurel crown: worn by kings, later by triumphant generals
- Toga praetexta: the toga dyed purple, later worn by magistrates
- Chariot triumph: originally a royal Etruscan ceremony, later became the triumph of victorious generals

== During the Republic ==
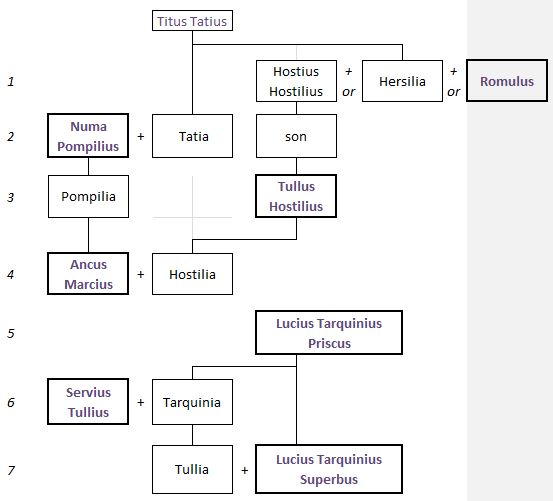
Family relations

The overthrow of the Roman monarchy of Tarquinius Superbus led to a limited separation of the powers mentioned above.

The actual title of king was retained for the rex sacrorum, who formally remained Rome's first priest. He was forbidden any political or military career, except for a seat in the Senate. However, the Roman desire to prevent the kingship from becoming important went so far that, even in the area of religion, the king of sacrifices was formally, in all but protocol, subordinated to the first of the pontiffs, the pontifex maximus (whose position in origin, rather than with the name of priest, is better described as "minister of religion"), to the extent that at some point in history, the Regia or royal palace at the Forum Romanum, originally inhabited by the king of sacrifices, was ceded to the pontifex maximus. Significantly enough, one of his major public appearances was at the festival of Regifugium, where he impersonated the king being thrown out of the city. Further, the consuls retained religious roles which were considered so important that the office of interrex was retained for the opening prayer of "electional" assemblies in case both consuls died in office, and the ritual of driving a nail into the temple of Jupiter sometimes even induced a dictatorship. The rex sacrorum was not elected publicly, but chosen by the pontifical college.

The king of sacrifices retained some religious rites only he could perform, and acted as quasi-flamen to Janus. The position seems to have continued in existence until the official adoption of the Christian religion. To qualify for the office, patrician ancestry was necessary; however it was once performed by a member of a family otherwise known as plebeian, the Marcii, earning for himself and his descendants the cognomen Rex.

As has been mentioned, the administrative functions in religion, including at some point the housing in the ancient royal court, were ceded to the supreme pontiff.

In the late Republic, the previous role of the king in choosing new senators and dismissing people from the Senate was ceded to the censors. However, the role of choosing senators became rather limited as all magistrates down to the rank of quaestor eventually gained admission to the Senate after the office's expiration.

The modern concept of a head of state, insofar as the republican times excepting the dictatorships are concerned, can hardly be translated to Roman conceptions, but most other powers—the imperium—were ceded to the consuls (the etymology suggests that these were originally the king's chief counsellors) and to the praetors ("leaders") after the creation of that office (about 367, according to Livy); thereby at least roughly separating the judiciary from the executive. According to tradition (which is disputed by historians for the first decades), the consulate was always entrusted to two persons to prevent autocracy. In case of emergencies, the power to appoint a dictator for a six-month term was introduced. Later, proconsuls and propraetors could be given an imperium by appointment of the Senate. Whoever used the imperium to victoriously lead an army could acquire the title of imperator, which later became chief title of the emperors, who were formally included in the system as proconsuls over most (and the strategically most important) parts of the empire, chief senators, and popular tribunes without the title. The republican idea that all promagisterial imperium ends upon entering the city was not observed in the emperors' case.

At the same time, the legislation was practically passed from the Curiate Assembly to the Centuriate Assembly (and Tribal Assembly), with the exception of the formality, more or less, of a lex curiata de imperio, which ratified the elections of the previous Centuriate Assembly. The consuls did, however, retain the power to rule by ordinance.

== See also ==
- Roman emperor
- Pompilia gens
- Hostilia gens
- Marcia gens
- Tullia gens
- Tarquinia gens
