= Caelius Vibenna =

Etruscan noble

Caelius Vibenna (Etruscan Caile Vipina) was a noble Etruscan, perhaps legendary, who lived during Rome's regal period. He was a brother of Aulus Vibenna (Etruscan Avile Vipina).

Accounts of his life differ. In one version, upon arriving in Rome, Vibenna was a friend of the sixth king of Rome Servius Tullius. He and his brother Aulus are also recorded as having aided King Tarquinius Superbus. Tacitus relates that a certain hill in Rome, previously named Querquetulanus (after the oak trees covering the hill) was renamed the Caelian Hill after him.

A burial urn inscribed Arnth Caule Vipina was found at Deposito de' Dei at Chiusi, Italy. It is likely that the ashes within belong to a different Etruscan of the same name.

== In legend ==
Caelius and Aulus Vibenna seem to have been well-known figures in Etruscan legend. The emperor Claudius, in a speech to the Senate, referred to the 'adventures' of Caelius Vibenna and his companion 'Mastarna', whom Claudius equates with Servius Tullius. Claudius claimed that Mastarna left Etruria with the remnants of Caelius' army and occupied the Caelian Hill, naming it after Vibenna.

The François Tomb at Vulci contains a scene showing Caelius and Aulus Vibenna taking part in one of these adventures. The scene appears to show Caelius and Aulus Vibenna and Mastarna with companions named 'Larth Ulthes', 'Rasce' and 'Marce Camitlnas'. These figures are shown slaughtering foes named as 'Laris Papathnas Velznach', 'Pesna Aremsnas Sveamach', 'Venthical[...]plsachs' and 'Cneve Tarchunies Rumach' (interpreted as 'Gnaeus Tarquinius of Rome'). It appears that the group of foes had taken Caelius, Aulus, Mastarna, Rasce and Marce Camitlnas prisoner, but while they were sleeping, Larth Ulthes crept into their camp armed with swords which he gave to his companions. The erstwhile prisoners are shown killing their former captors. Mastarna is shown freeing Caelius Vibenna.

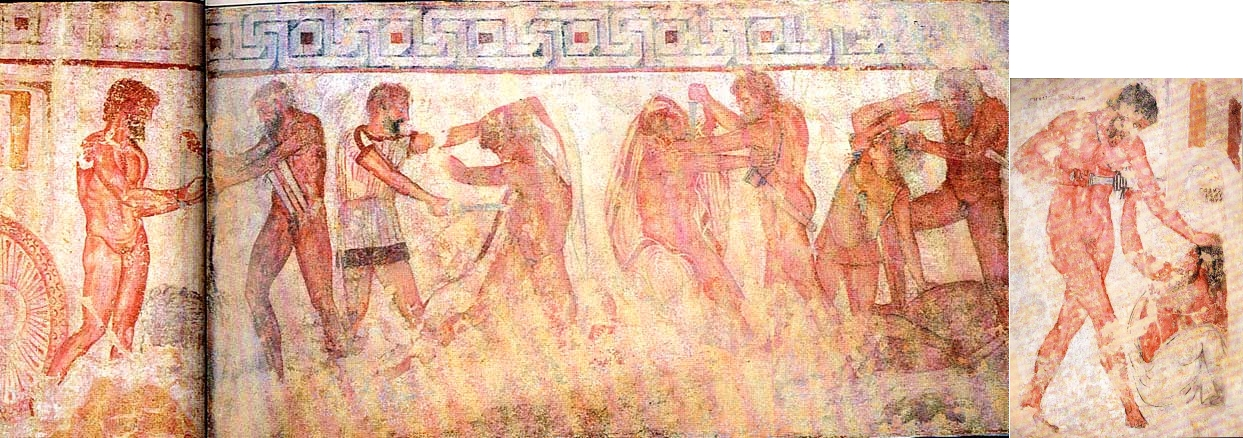
Fresco in the François Tomb: Liberation of Caelius Vibenna, from left to right: Caile Vibenna, Mastarna, Larth Ultes, Laris Papathnas Velznach, Pesna Aremsnas Sveamach, Rasce, Venthikau and Aule Vibenna, right: Marce Camitlnas and Cnaeve Tarchunies Rumach

== Sources ==
- Cornell, T. J. (1995). The Beginnings of Rome: Italy and Rome from the Bronze Age to the Punic Wars (c.1000-264 BC). Routledge. ISBN 978-0415015967.
- Dennis, George (1848). The Cities and Cemeteries of Etruria (facsimile). Vol. II. John Murray. p. 373.
- Pais, Ettore (1906). Ancient Legends of Roman History. trans. Mario Emilio Cosenza. London: Swan Sonnenschein. pp. 129–131. Archived from the original (facsimile) on 2015-09-09 – via Questia.
- Marcus Terentius Varro (1938) [c.65 BCE]. Kent, Roland G. (ed.). Lingua Latina (facsimile). Vol. Book V 46. pp. 42–43.
