= Tim Cornell =

British historian of ancient Rome (born 1946)

Timothy J. Cornell (born 1946) is a British historian specializing in ancient Rome. He is an Emeritus Professor of Ancient History at the University of Manchester, having retired from his teaching position in 2011.

Cornell received his bachelor's degree in Ancient History with first class honours from University College London (1968) and his PhD in history from the University of London (1972). He was a student of Arnaldo Momigliano and wrote his dissertation "Cato's Origines and the non-Roman historical tradition of ancient Italy". He was a fellow at Christ's College, Cambridge (1973–1975), assistant director of The British School at Rome (1975–1977), lecturer and senior lecturer in Ancient History at University College London (1978–1988, 1988–1995).

Between 1995 and 2011, he was a professor of Ancient History at the University of Manchester, apart from a brief period as Director of the Institute of Classical Studies at the School of Advanced Study, University of London (2004-2006). Following his retirement in 2011, Cornell was made Emeritus Professor of Ancient History at the University of Manchester. In June 2018 he was elected President of the Society for the Promotion of Roman Studies.

== Selected works ==
- 'Aeneas and the Twins: the development of the Roman foundation legend' in Proceedings of the Cambridge Philological Society n.s. 21 (1975), 1-32
- 'Rome and Latium Vetus, 1974-79', Archaeological Reports 26 (1980), pp. 71–89
- (With J.F. Matthews) Atlas of the Roman World (Oxford: Phaidon; New York: Facts on File, 1982)
- 'Rome and Latium Vetus, 1980-85', in Archaeological Reports 32 (1986), pp. 123–33
- 'Rome and Latium to 390 BC', in The Cambridge Ancient History, 2nd ed., vol. VII.2 (Cambridge: CUP 1989), ch. 6, pp. 243–308; 'The Recovery of Rome', ibid., ch. 7, pp. 309–350; 'The Conquest of Italy', ibid. ch. 8, pp. 351–419
- Translator and Joint editor (with G.W. Bowersock): Studies on Modern Scholarship, by A. Momigliano (Berkeley, 1994).
- The Beginnings of Rome: Italy and Rome from the Bronze Age to the Punic Wars, c. 1000 - 264 BC (London: Routledge, 1995).
- Editor (with Boris Rankov and Philip Sabin): The Second Punic War: A Reappraisal (London: Institute of Classical Studies, 1996)
- General Editor: The Fragments of the Roman Historians, vols. I-III (Oxford: Oxford University Press, 2013)
