= François Tomb =

Etruscan tomb from Ponte Rotto Necropolis

Coordinates: 42°25′2.8″N 11°38′20.6″E

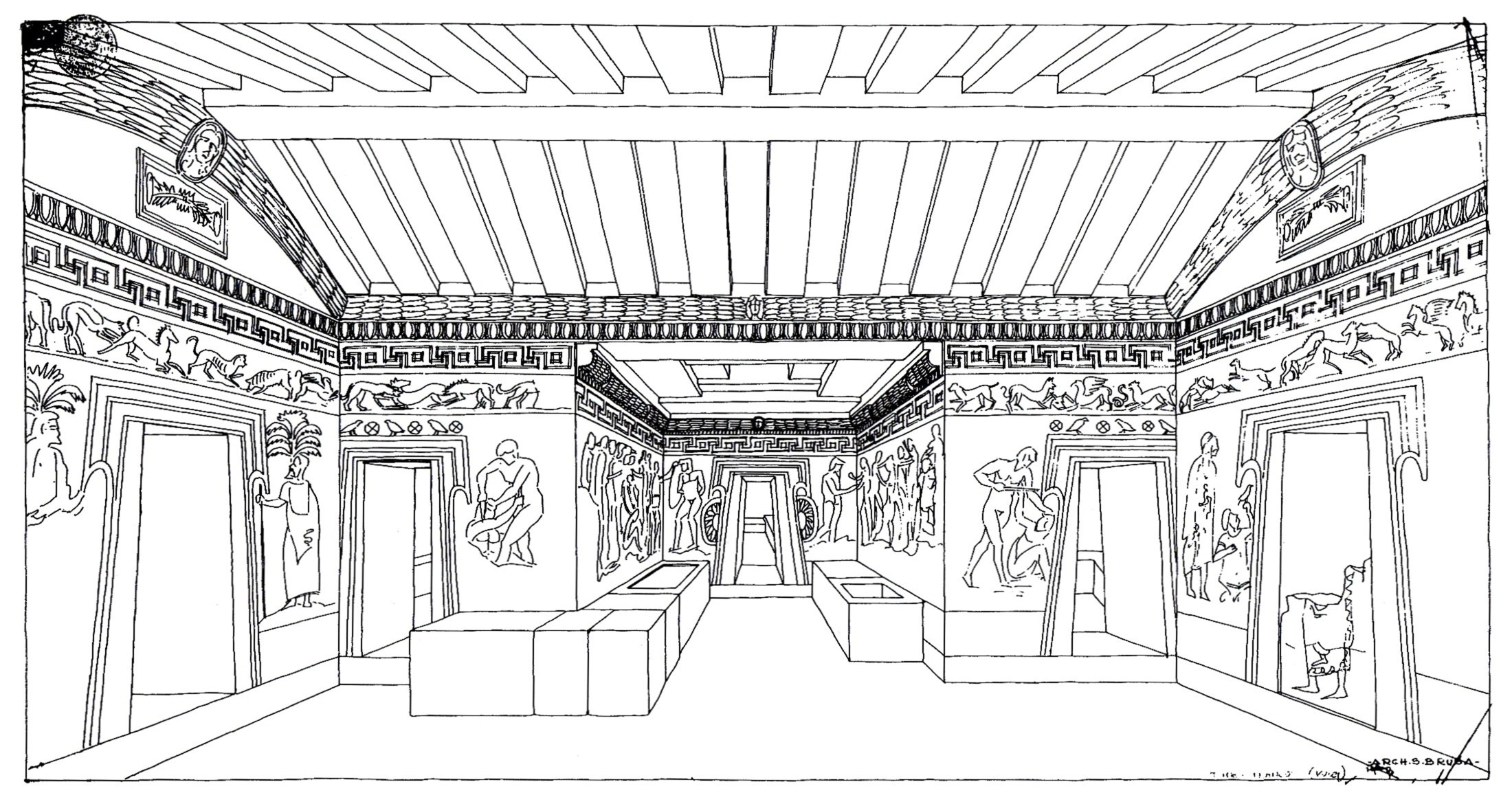
- The main burial chamber
- Type: tomb
- Cultures: Etruscan
- Location: Vulci, Lazio, Italy
- Region: Province of Viterbo

History
- Built: late fourth century BC

Site notes
- Excavation dates: 1857
- Archaeologists: Alessandro François and Adolphe Noël des Vergers
- Condition: ruined
- Public access: no

The François Tomb is an important painted Etruscan tomb from the Ponte Rotto Necropolis in the Etruscan city of Vulci, Lazio, in central Italy. It was discovered in 1857 by Alessandro François and Adolphe Noël des Vergers. It dates to the last quarter of the fourth century BC. The tomb seems to belong to the Etruscan family of the Saties (or Seties) and one of its chief occupants is Vel Saties, who appears with his dwarf, Arnza.

Its outstanding frescoes are significant both iconographically and also in terms of their comments on Etruscan history and identity. Some pottery vessels from the tomb are now in the British Museum.

== Frescos ==
The central T-shaped chamber contained the following frescoes:

- Cassandra dragged from the altar by Ajax, son of Oileus
- Nestor and Phoenix in front of palm trees
- The duel of Eteocles and Polynices.
- A scene from the Iliad depicting Trojan prisoners being slaughtered by Achilles, Agamemnon, and Ajax, son of Telamon, in honor of Patroclus, in the presence of Vanth and Charun.
- The Mastarna cycle described below.
- Vel Saties, the owner of the tomb, wearing the toga picta, and his dwarf servant, Arnza (meaning "little Arnth"), holding by a string a woodpecker, the bird of the god Laran. This could be a scene depicting the observation of a bird's flight for divinatory purposes. Also Vel's wife is depicted.
- The torment of Sisyphus in the presence of Amphiaraus.

The frescos were removed by Prince Torlonia in 1862 and were kept in the Torlonia Museum (Rome). From 1946 they were stored at the private Villa Albani in Rome as part of the Torlonia collection until being acquired by the Italian state in 2026 and moved to the Museo Nazionale Etrusco di Villa Giulia.

=== The Mastarna cycle ===
The most famous of these is a fresco depicting Caelius Vibenna (whom the Romans believed the Caelian Hill was named after) and Mastarna (a legendary figure whom the Emperor Claudius identified with Servius Tullius). The paintings also include a representation of Marce Camitlas (Latin equivalent "Marcus Camillus") about to draw his sword against a crouching Cneve Tarchunies Rumach (that is, "Gnaeus Tarquinius of Rome", though ancient histories of Rome do not include any reference to a Tarquinius with the praenomen Gnaeus).

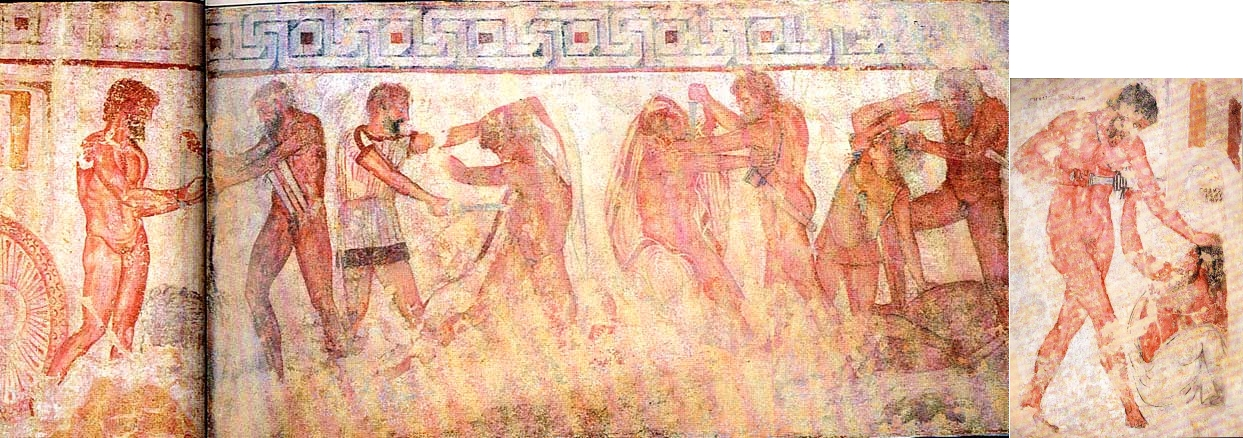
Fresco in the François Tomb: Liberation of Celio Vibenna, from left to right: Caile Vibenna, Mastarna, Larth Ultes, Laris Papathnas Velznach, Pesna Aremsnas Sveamach, Rasce, Venthikau and Aule Vibenna, right: Marce Camitlnas et Cnaeve Tarchunies Rumach

== See also ==
- Etruscan art
- Isis Tomb, Vulci

== Sources ==
- Bloom, Marcia G. 1974. The François tomb at Vulci, an Etrusco-Hellenistic monument. Thesis/dissertation, University of Pennsylvania.
- Holliday, Peter James. 1993. Narrative and event in ancient art. Cambridge University Press.
