= Centaur of Vulci =

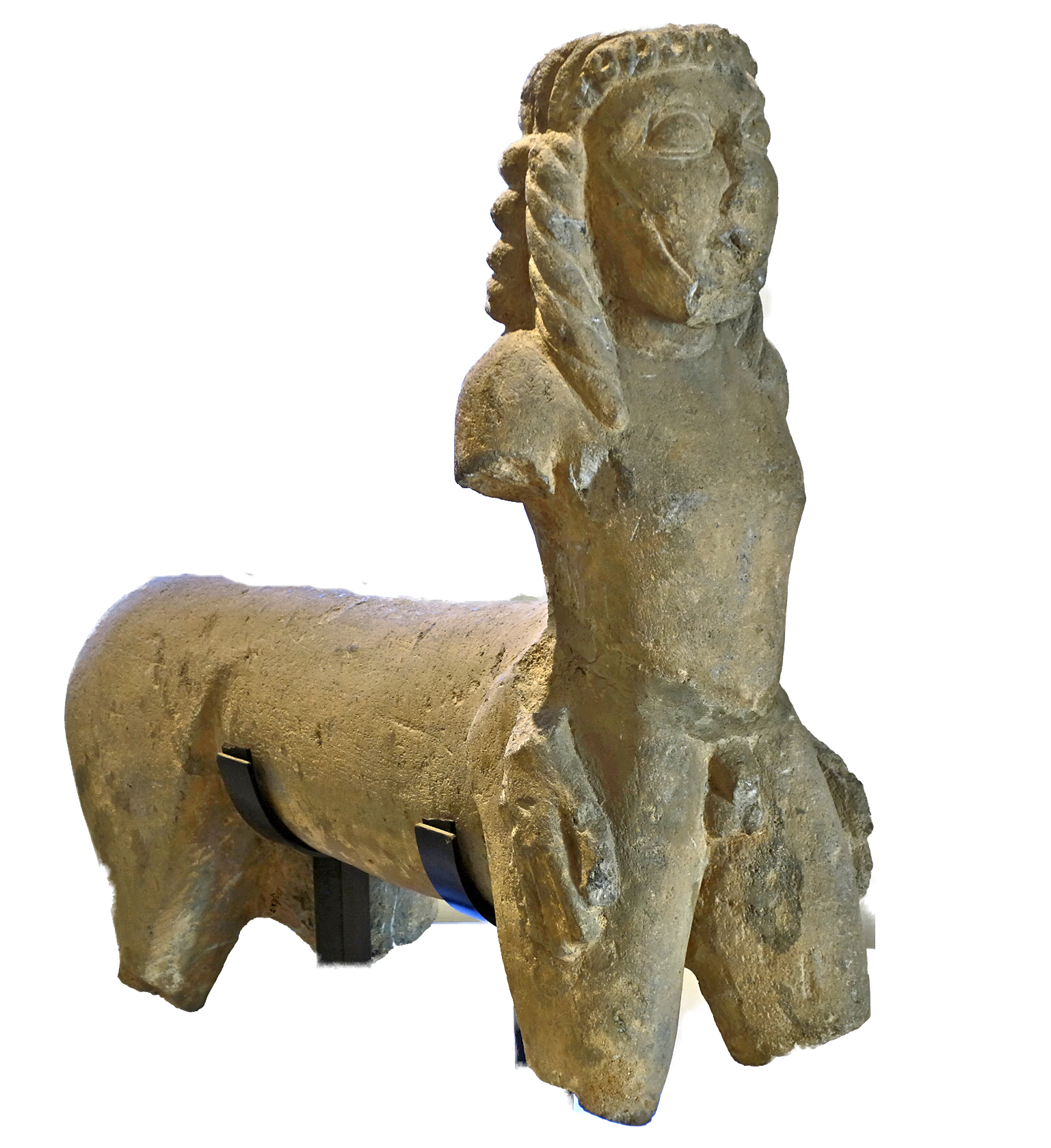
Centaur of Vulci, National Etruscan Museum, Villa Giulia, Rome.

The Centaur of Vulci is a statue of the Etruscan Orientalising period, discovered in Vulci near Etruscan Viterbo, now in the collection of the National Etruscan Museum of Villa Giulia in Rome.

== History ==
The statue was discovered in a private tomb in the necropolis of Poggio Maremma in the Vulci Archaeological Park.

== Description ==
This nenfro statue dates from 590 to 580 BC. It represents a centaur, a character from Greek mythology with a human torso and a horse's body.

The head, with an incised beard and hair falling into three braids on the upper legs, gives way to a brief chest and an equine body that lacks a tail. The arms are missing, and also the legs below the knees; hands are visible on the hips.

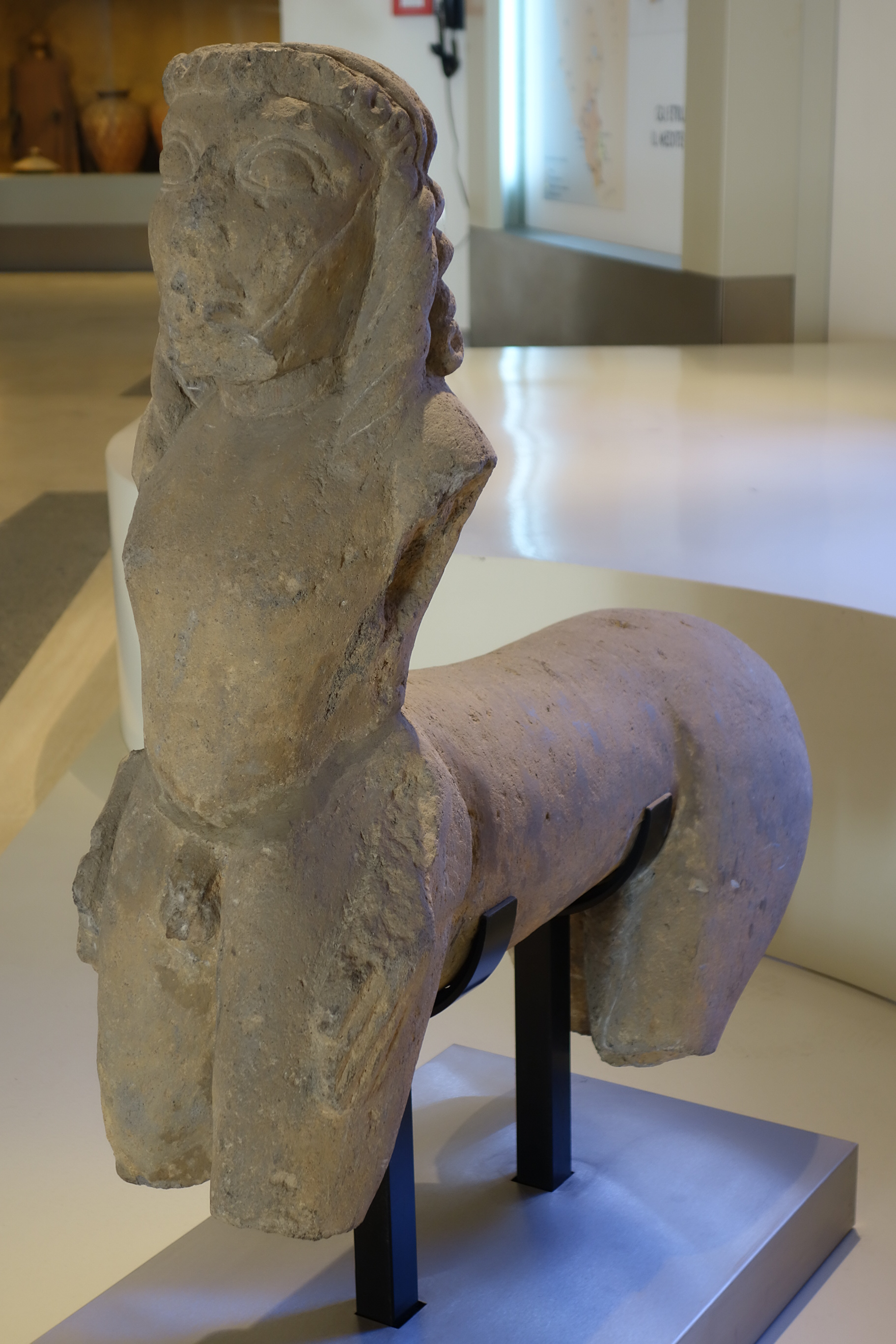

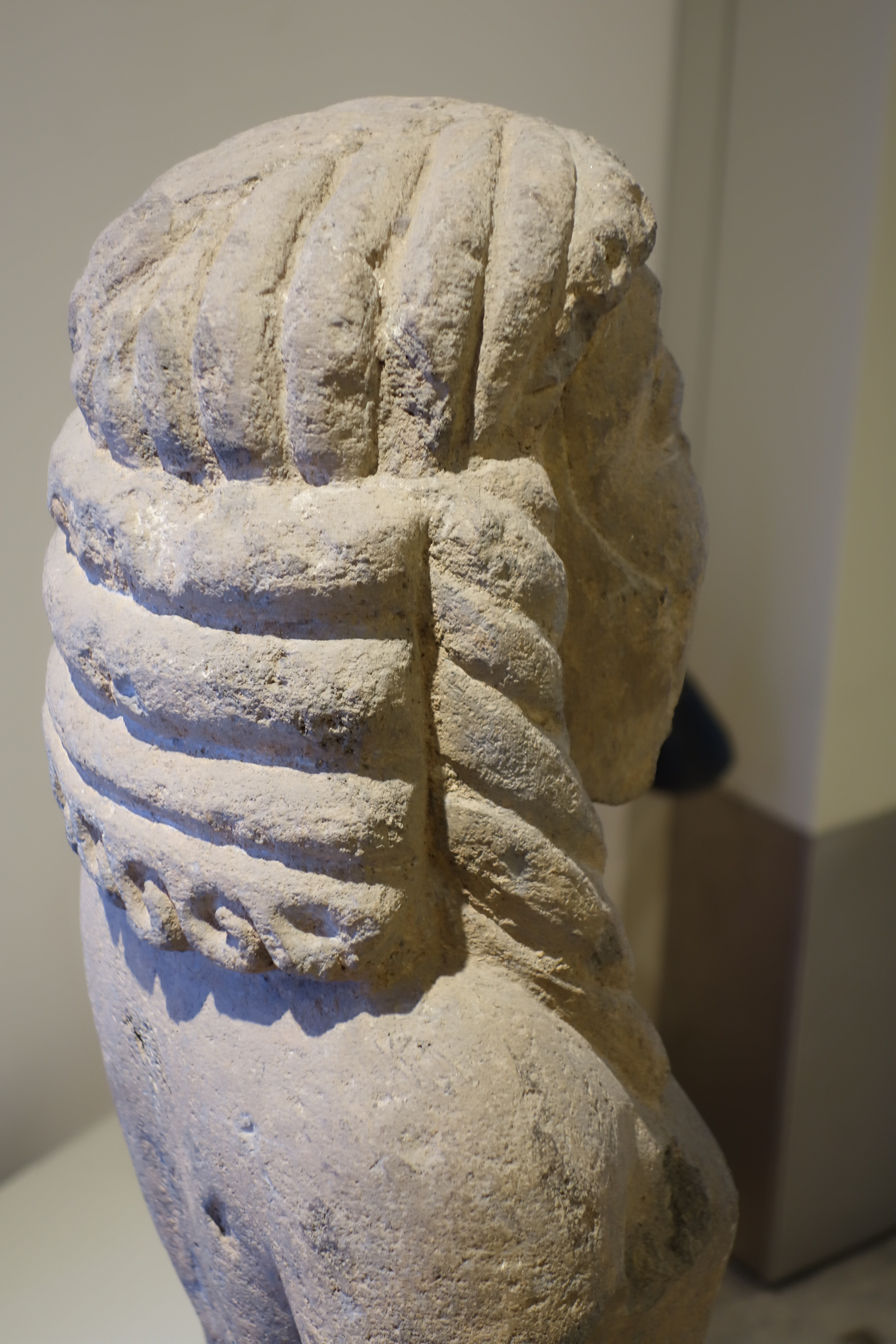

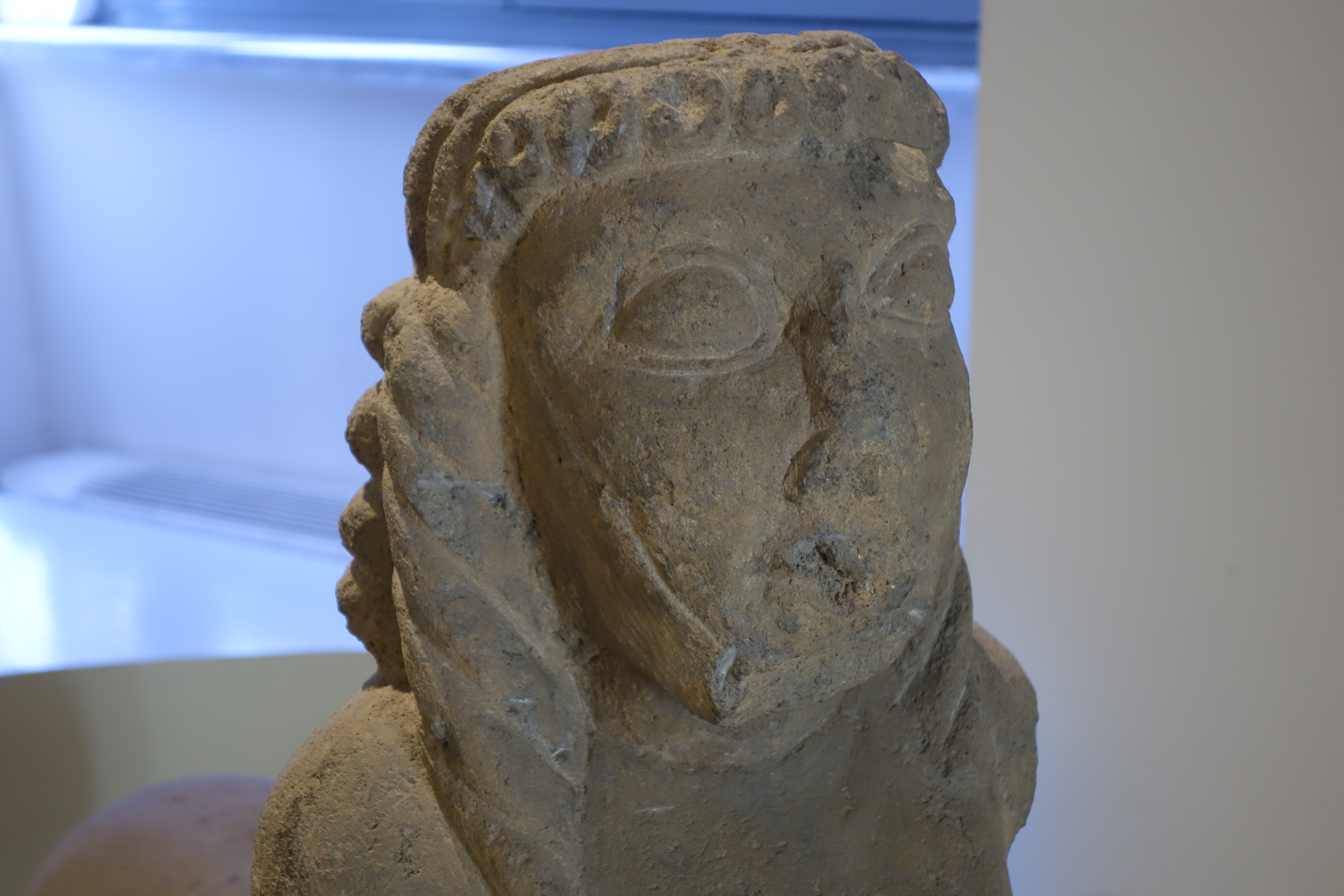

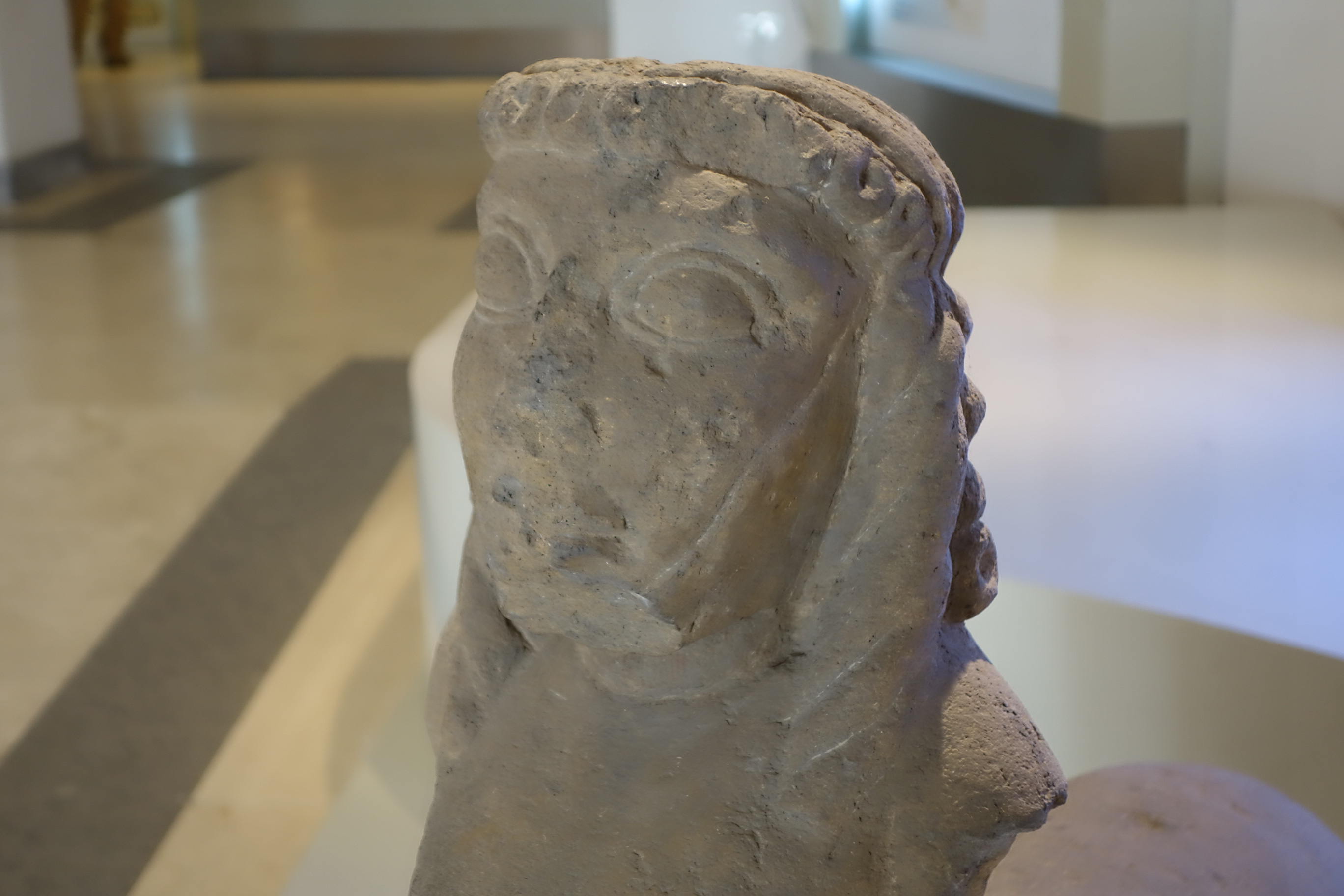
