= Winged Lion of Vulci =

6th-century BC Etruscan sculpture

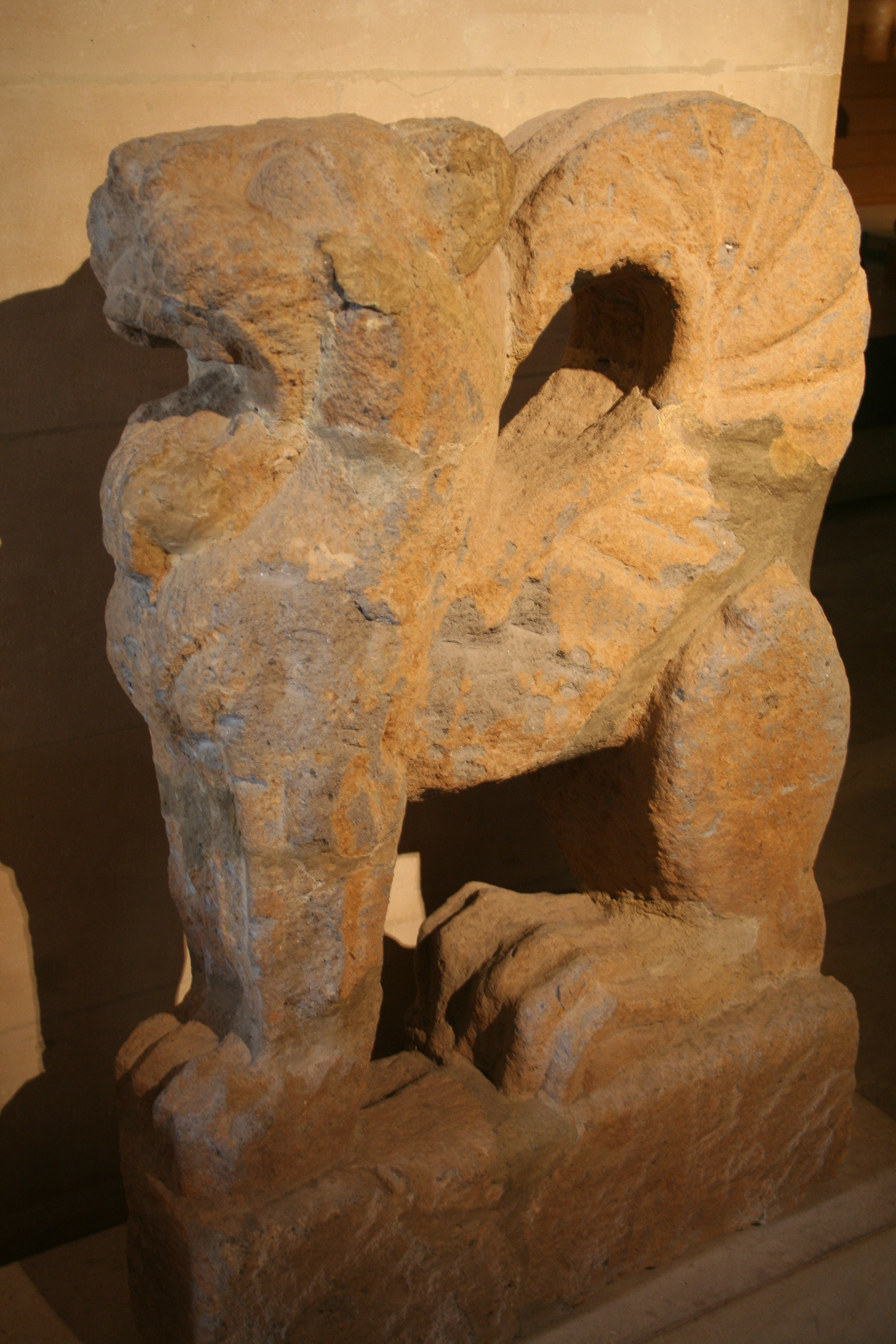
Winged Lion of Vulci

The Winged Lion of Vulci is a nenfro sculpture of a lion with wings, carved between 550 BC and 540 BC and discovered in excavations of the necropoli of the Etruscan city of Vulci. It is now in the Louvre.

Inspired by both ancient Greek and ancient Near East models, it is one of many such sculptures discovered in the excavations and intended for the entrances to tombs and funerary chambers.

== Sources ==
- Alain Hus, Recherches sur la statuaire en pierre étrusque archaïque, Bibliothèque des Écoles françaises d'Athènes et de Rome, fasc. 198, Paris, De Boccard, 1961.
- http://www.louvre.fr/llv/oeuvres/detail_notice.jsp?CONTENT%3C%3Ecnt_id=10134198673383383&CURRENT_LLV_NOTICE%3C%3Ecnt_id=10134198673383383&FOLDER%3C%3Efolder_id=9852723696500818&baseIndex=2
