= Nenfro =

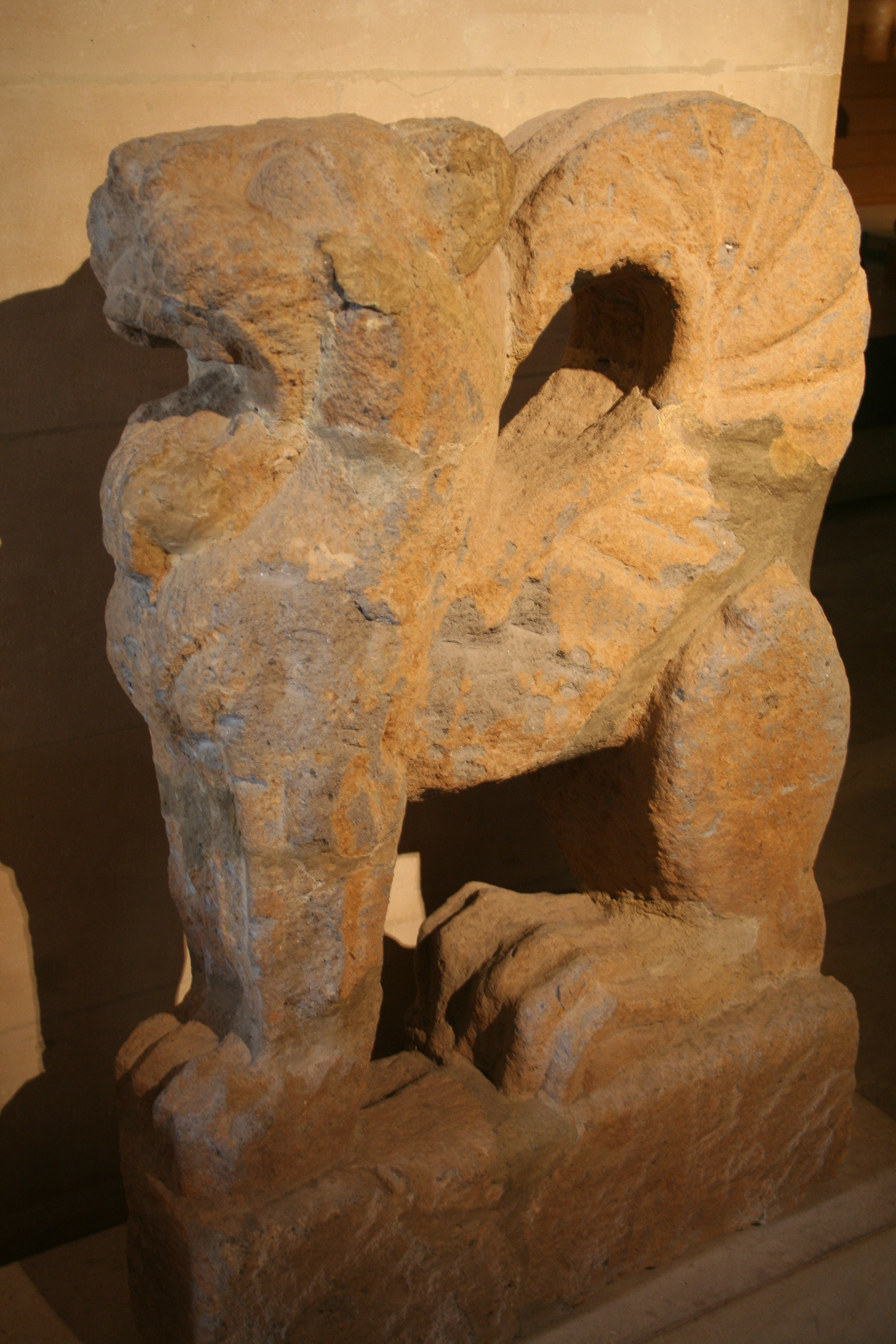
The Winged lion of Vulci, Louvre, Paris

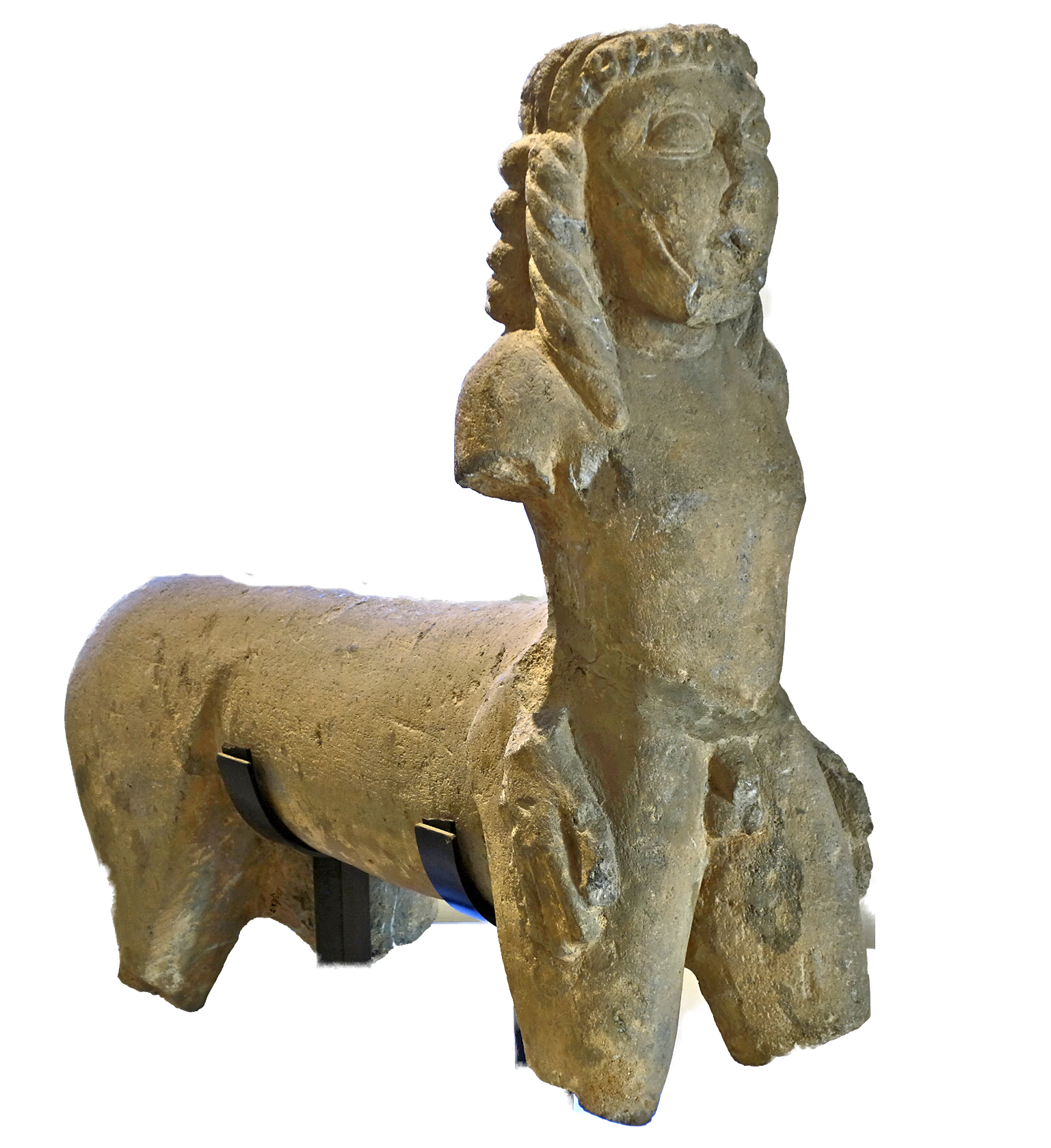
Centaur of Vulci, National Etruscan Museum, Villa Giulia, Rome

Nenfro is a volcanic rock, gray tuff or banded trachyte (Brocchi) or leucite phonolite lava (Rosenbusch) with a soft but compact structure, typical of the Viterbo region that the Etruscans used in their sculptures of northern Lazio Cimini hills near Rome, Italy.

- The Winged Lion of Vulci, in the Louvre
- The Centaur of Vulci, preserved in the Villa Giulia in Rome
- The sarcophagus of Laris Pulena MS 3488 of Civita Musarna.
- The sarcophagi figured at the galleries and the entrance to the Tarquinia National Museum

One of its features is to take a pinkish tint when drying.
