= Isis Tomb, Vulci =

Etruscan tomb found at the Polledrara Cemetery, Vulci, Lazio, Italy

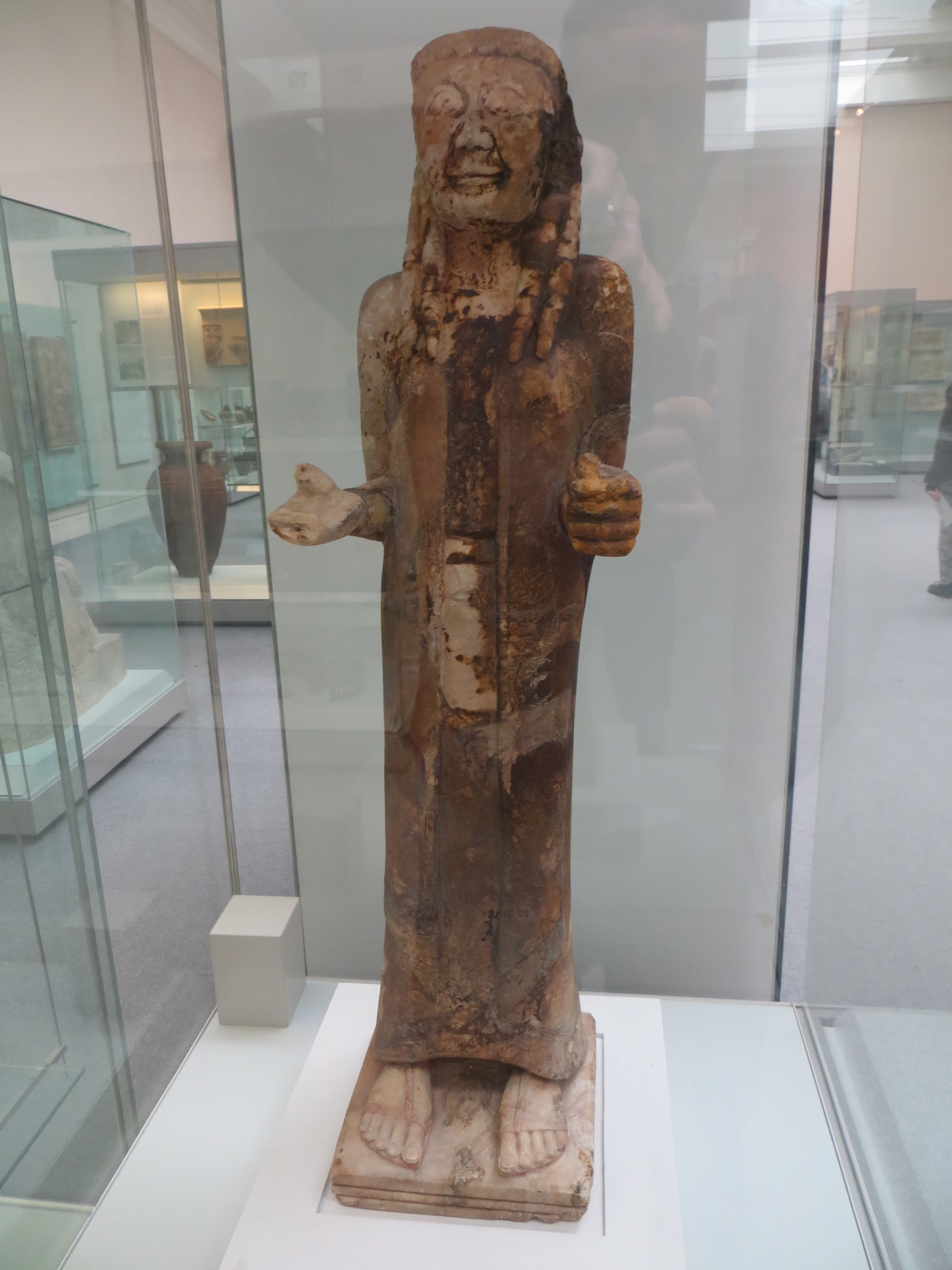
- Figure of a noble lady from the Isis Tomb, Vulci
- Material: Gypsum
- Size: 89 cm high
- Created: 570-560 BC
- Present location: British Museum, London
- Identification: 1850,0227.1

The Isis Tomb is a richly endowed Etruscan chamber tomb that was found at the Polledrara Cemetery, Vulci, Lazio, Italy, in the early nineteenth century. Many artefacts were discovered in the Isis Tomb when it was originally excavated but, as was custom at the time, only objects of high monetary value were kept. Over 60 of these objects are now held by the British Museum, with others scattered across a range of museums around the world.

== Discovery ==
The tomb was located on land that belonged to Lucien Bonaparte, Prince of Canino and brother of Napoleon. In 1839, Prince Lucien opened up a large 6th century tomb at the Polledrara Cemetery near Vulci. Many objects were found but only those considered valuable were retained - much ceramic pottery, for example was lost. In 1844, the Prince's widow Alexandrine de Bleschamp sold about sixty objects from the tomb to Dr Emil Braun of the German Archaeological Institute at Rome. These were later sold by Braun to the British Museum.

== Description of Objects ==
All the items found in the tomb date between 625 and 550 BC. The burial chamber is known as the 'Isis Tomb' because it was once thought that a bronze bust found in the tomb represented the Egyptian deity Isis. However the sculpture is more likely to depict a native fertility goddess or priestess. There were many objects from the Isis Tomb that were clearly imported from Egypt or elsewhere in the Middle East, which indicates trade and cultural exchange between Etruscans and Civilizations of the eastern Mediterranean. These included blue faience flasks and scarabs with hieroglyphic inscriptions. Four ostrich eggs, were probably decorated by Phoenician artists in Lebanon. There were also a large number of bronze vessels interred in the tomb, including cups, bowls, tripod-bowls, a cauldron, a lamp-stand, an amphora, a brazier and a cinerary urn. Ceramic objects included a hydria, a large amphora and a kylix, and there was also a range of gold jewellery included a diadem. Perhaps the most important objects buried in the tomb were a number of bronze and gypsum sculptures, including a half-life size statue of a noble lady, perhaps a depiction of the original occupant of the burial chamber. She is shown wearing a cloak and long tunic with traces of paint.

== Occupants of the Tomb ==
The exact location of the tomb is currently unknown as, once all materials from the chamber had been removed, it was filled in and abandoned. The names of the original occupants remain obscure, although archaeologists have suggested, based on the range and style of objects found, that a married couple was probably buried in the chamber, along with other members of their family. They must have come from a very affluent and prestigious Etruscan dynasty in Vulci, given the luxurious items they chose to be buried with, many of which must have been imported from abroad at great expense.

== Gallery ==
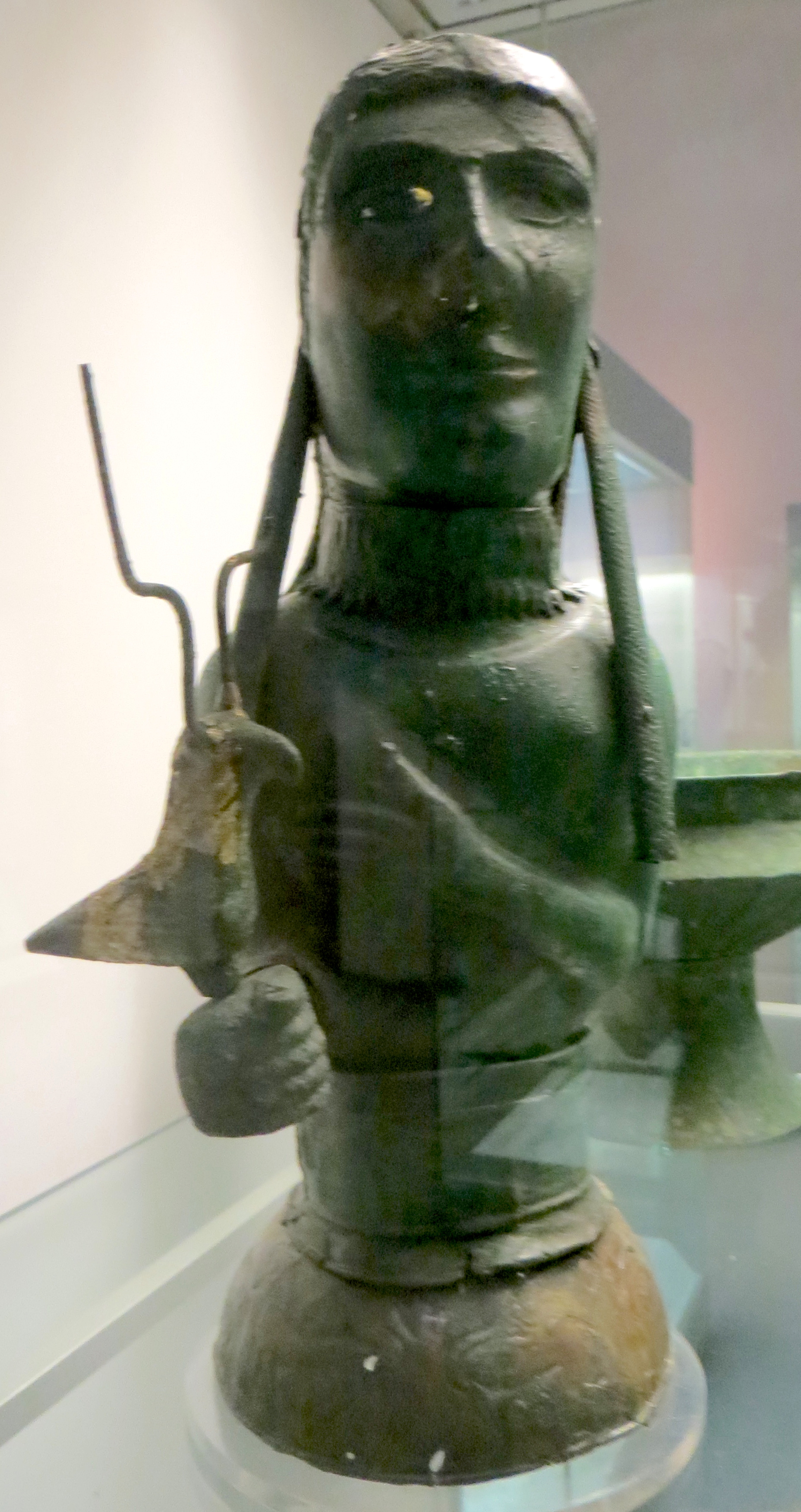
Bronze bust of a goddess holding a bird from the tomb that was originally thought to represent the goddess Isis

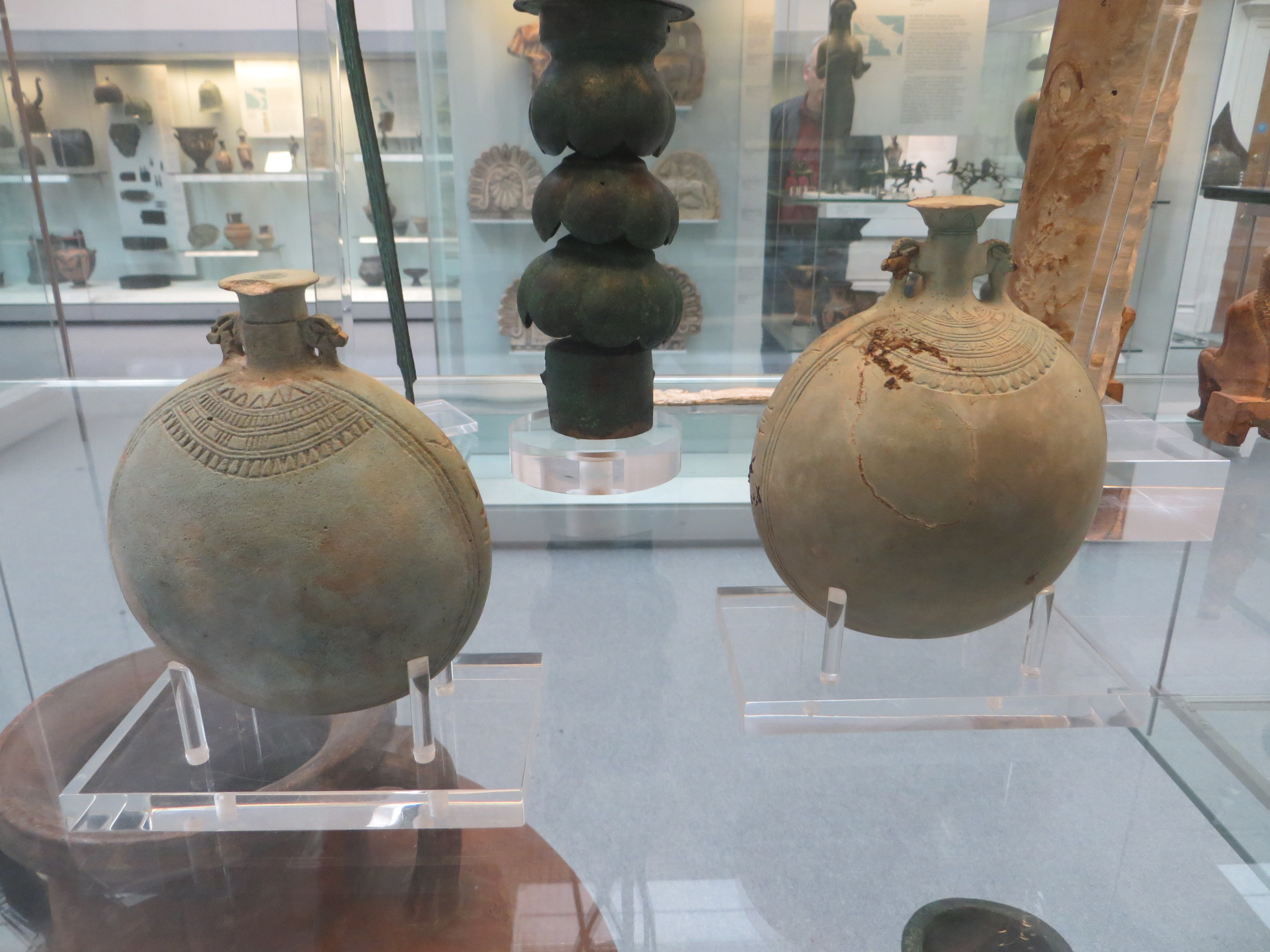
Two flasks with Egyptian hieroglyphic inscriptions

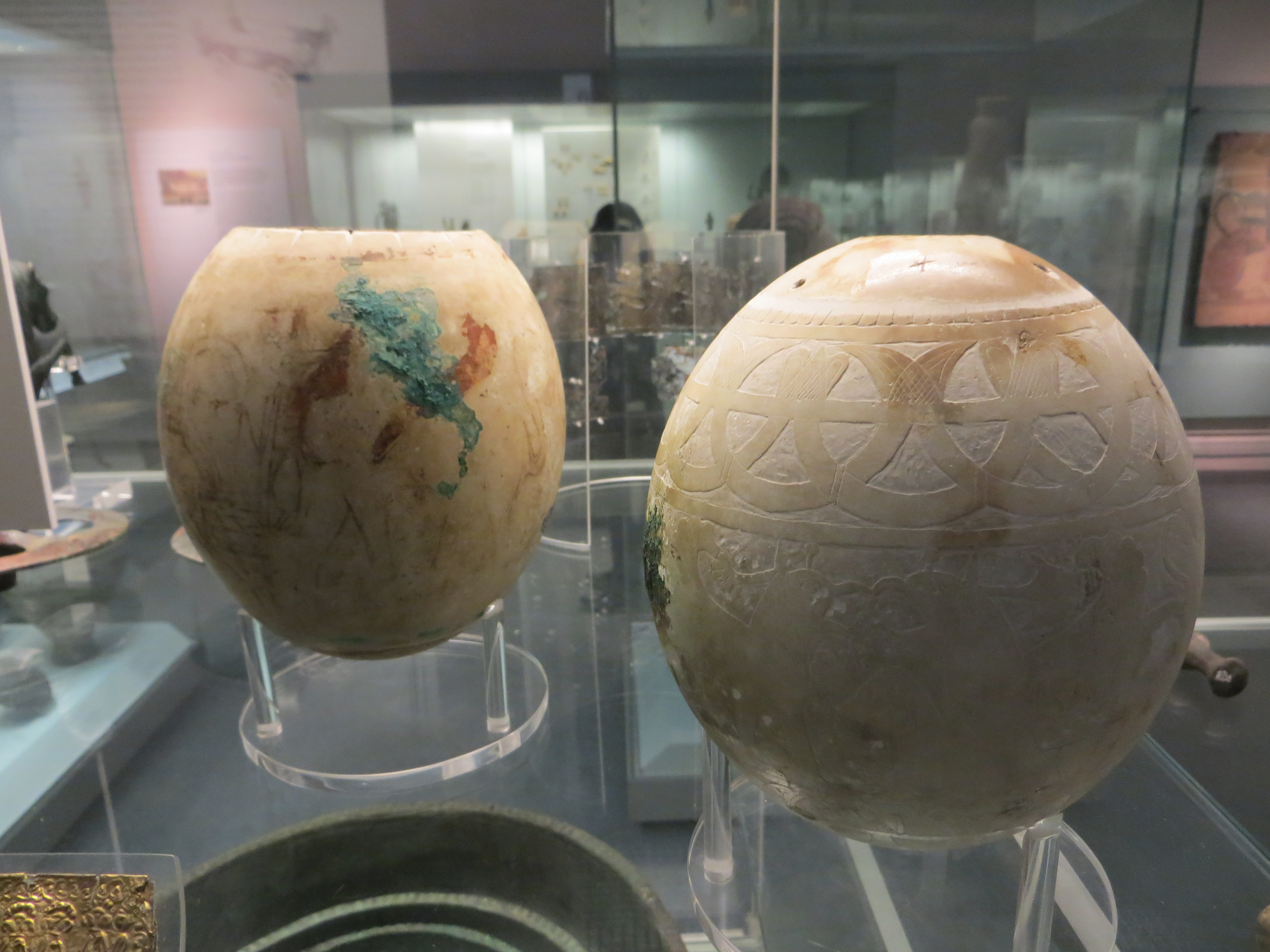
Ornamented and painted ostrich eggs from the tomb

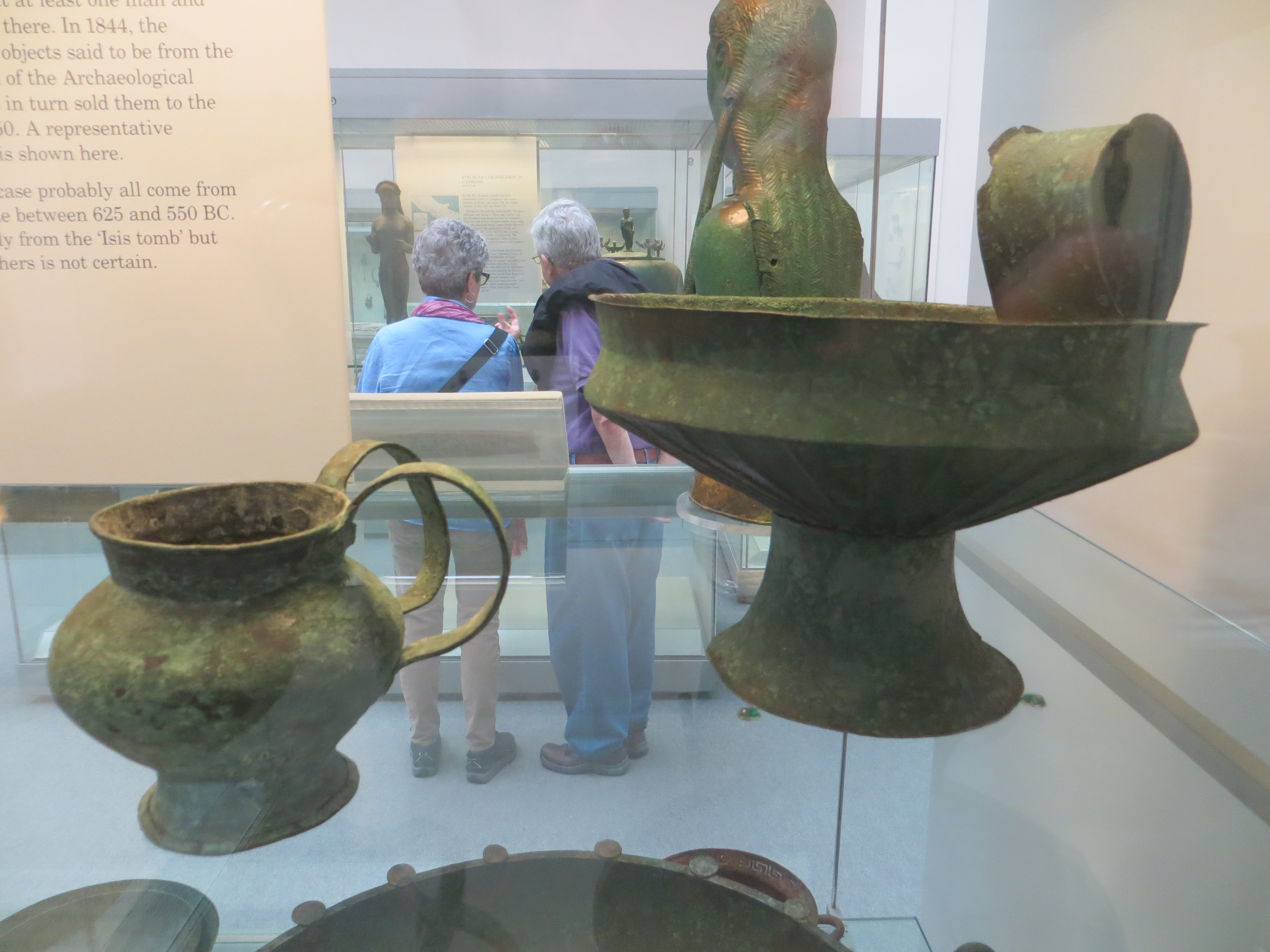
Two bronze vessels from the tomb

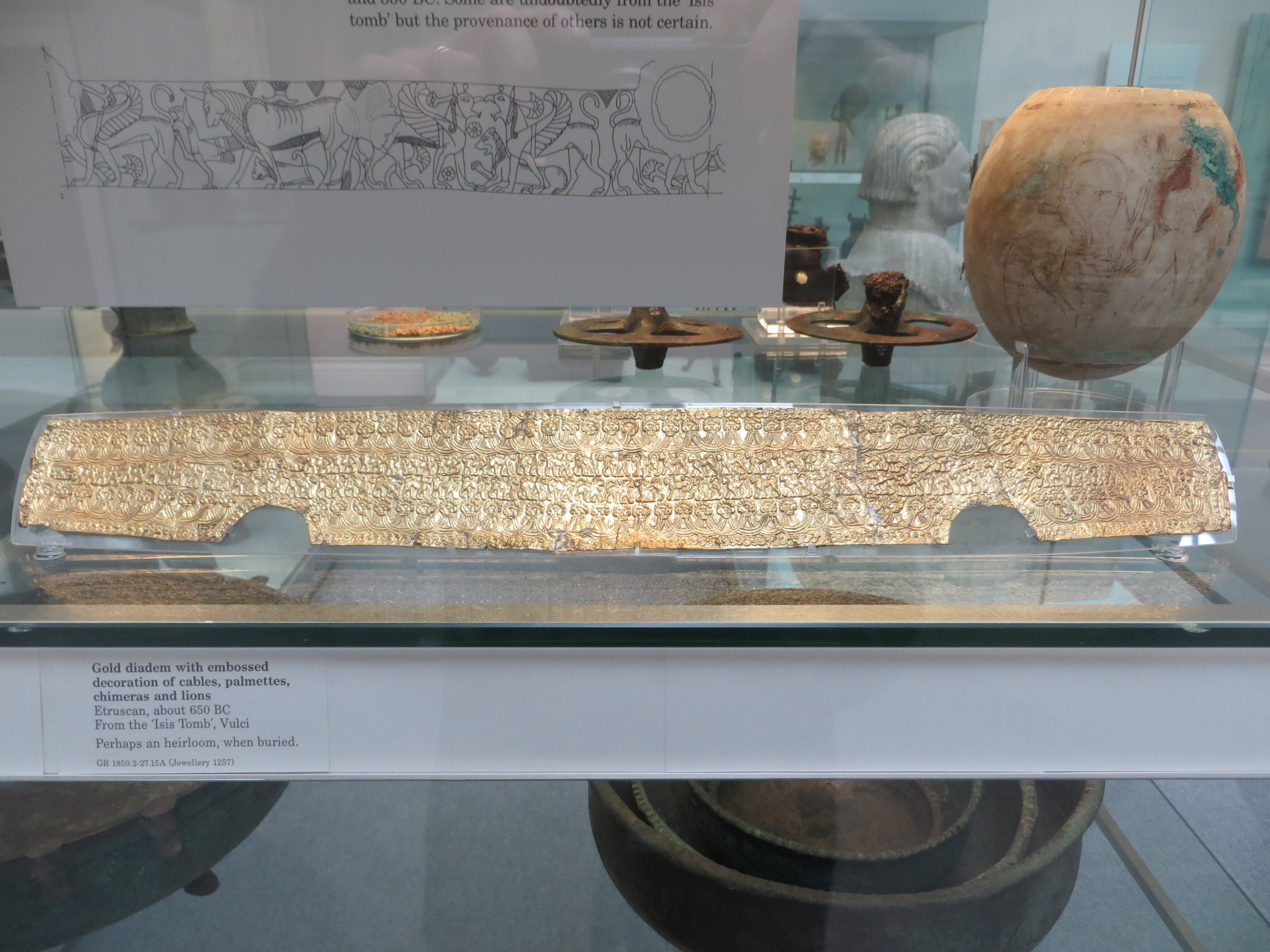
Gold diadem with embossed decoration of cables, palmettes, chimeras and lions

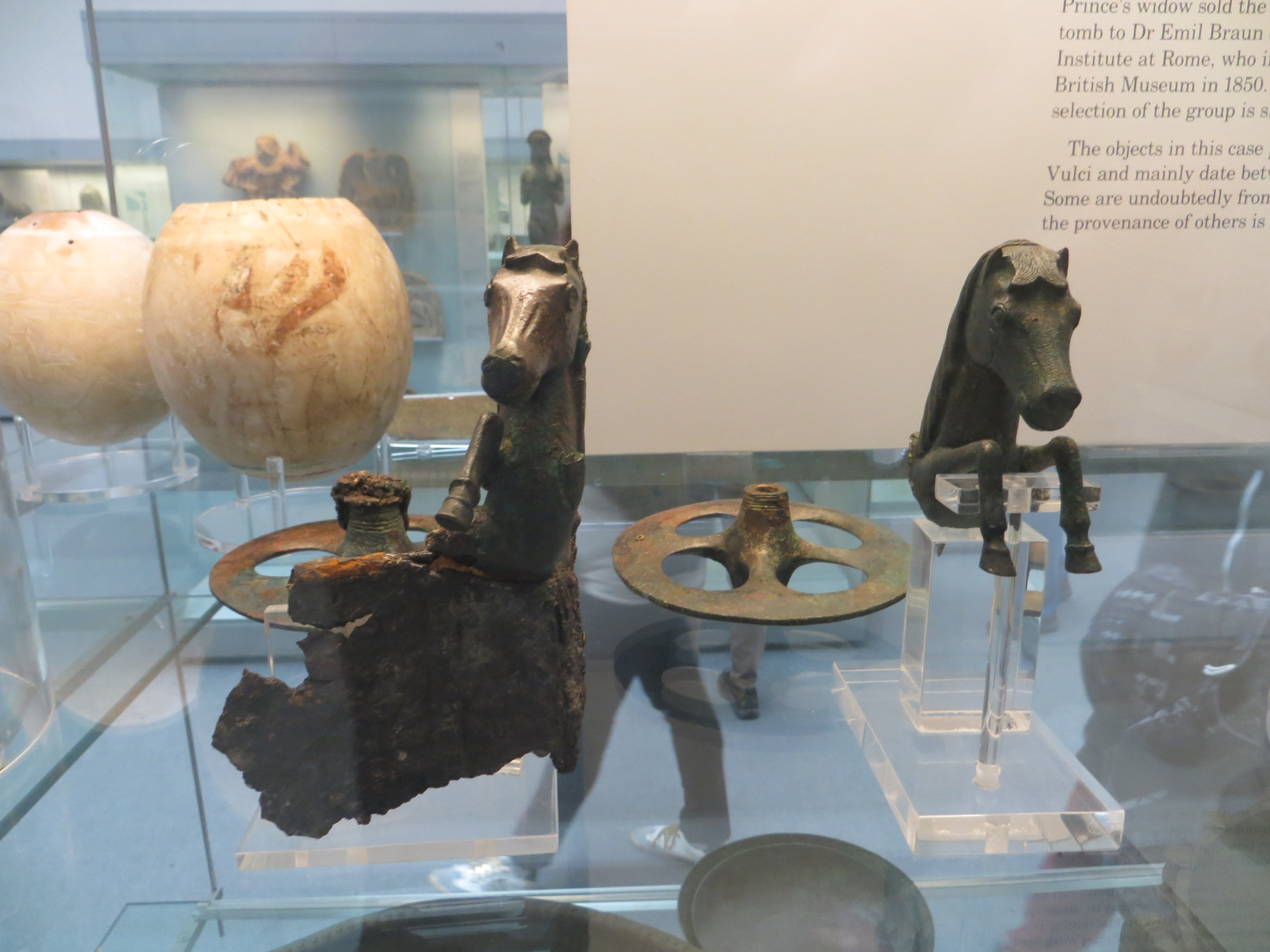
Part of an iron brazier: two bronze wheels and two bronze horses' heads

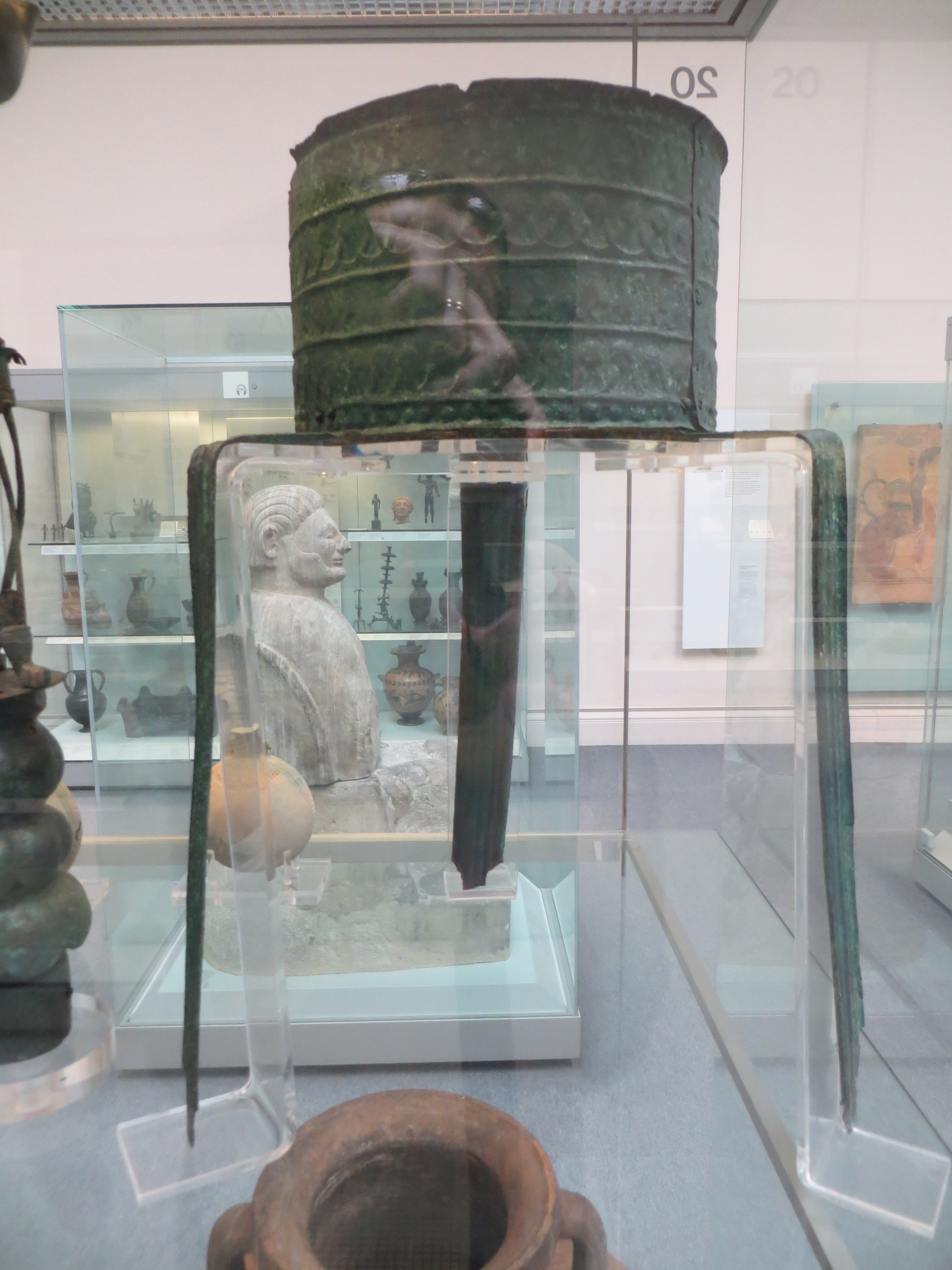
Bronze tripod stand with a hammered ring and cast feet

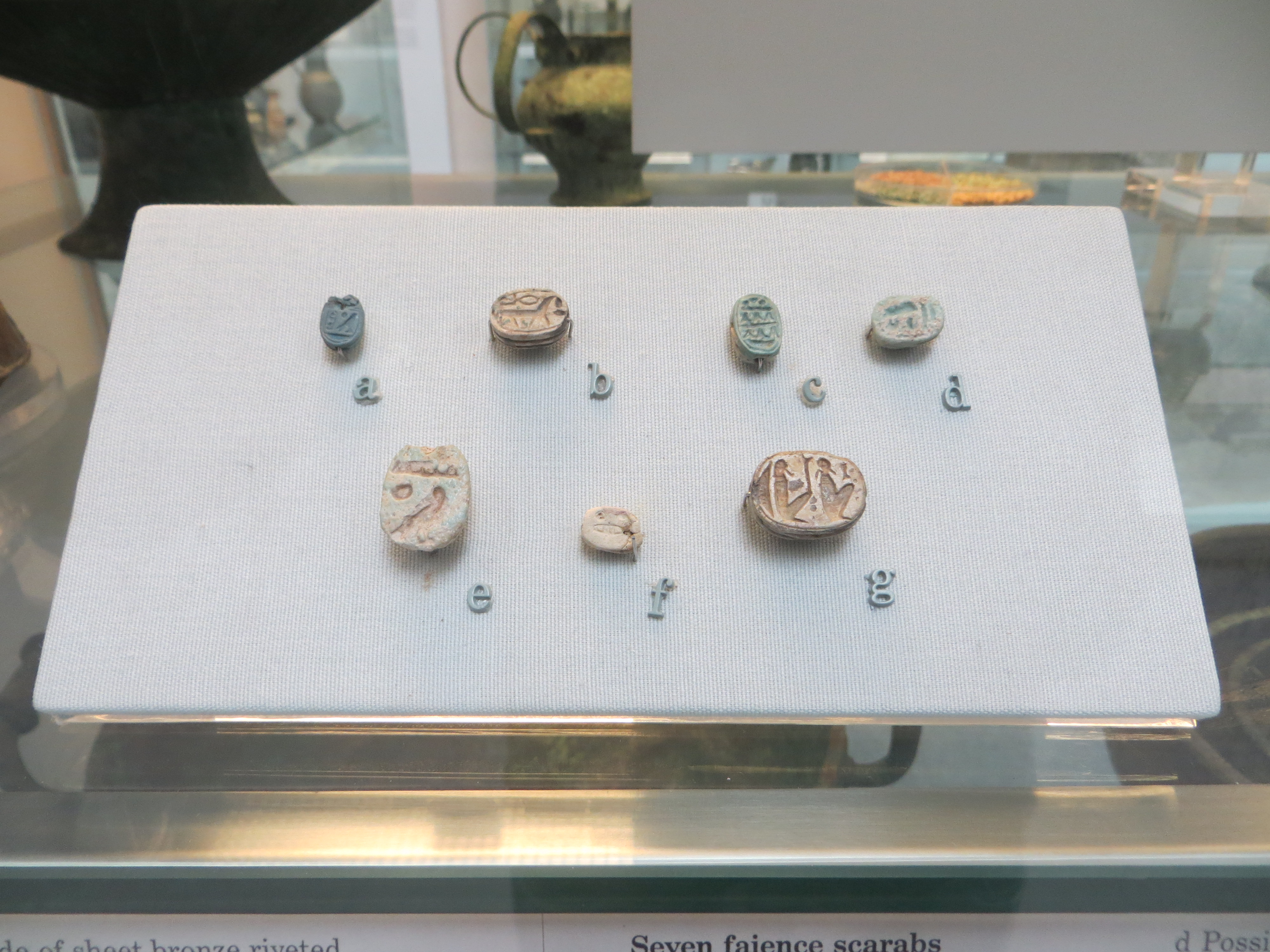
Ancient Egyptian scarabs found in the Isis Tomb

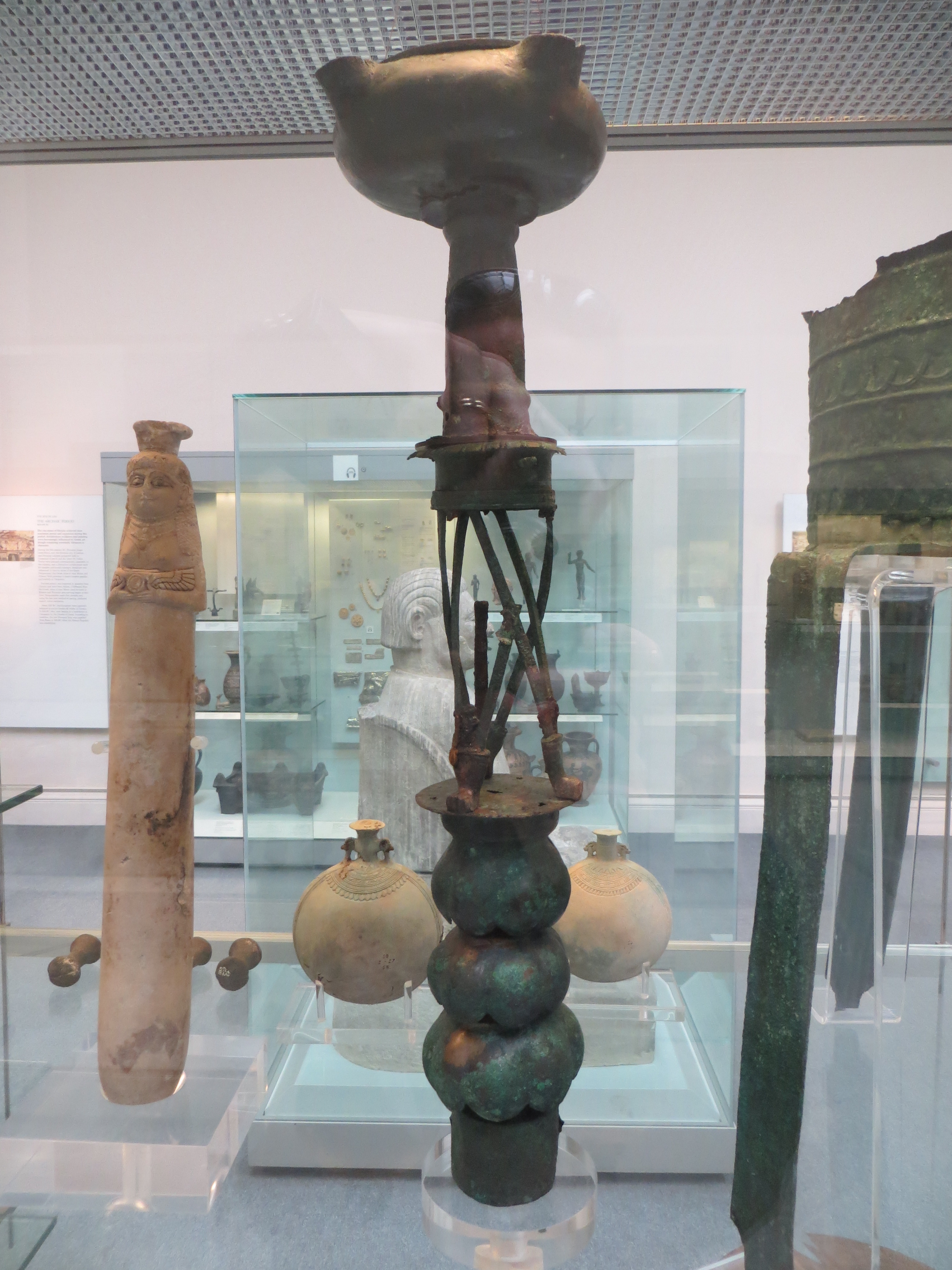
Bronze four-nozzled lamp-stand

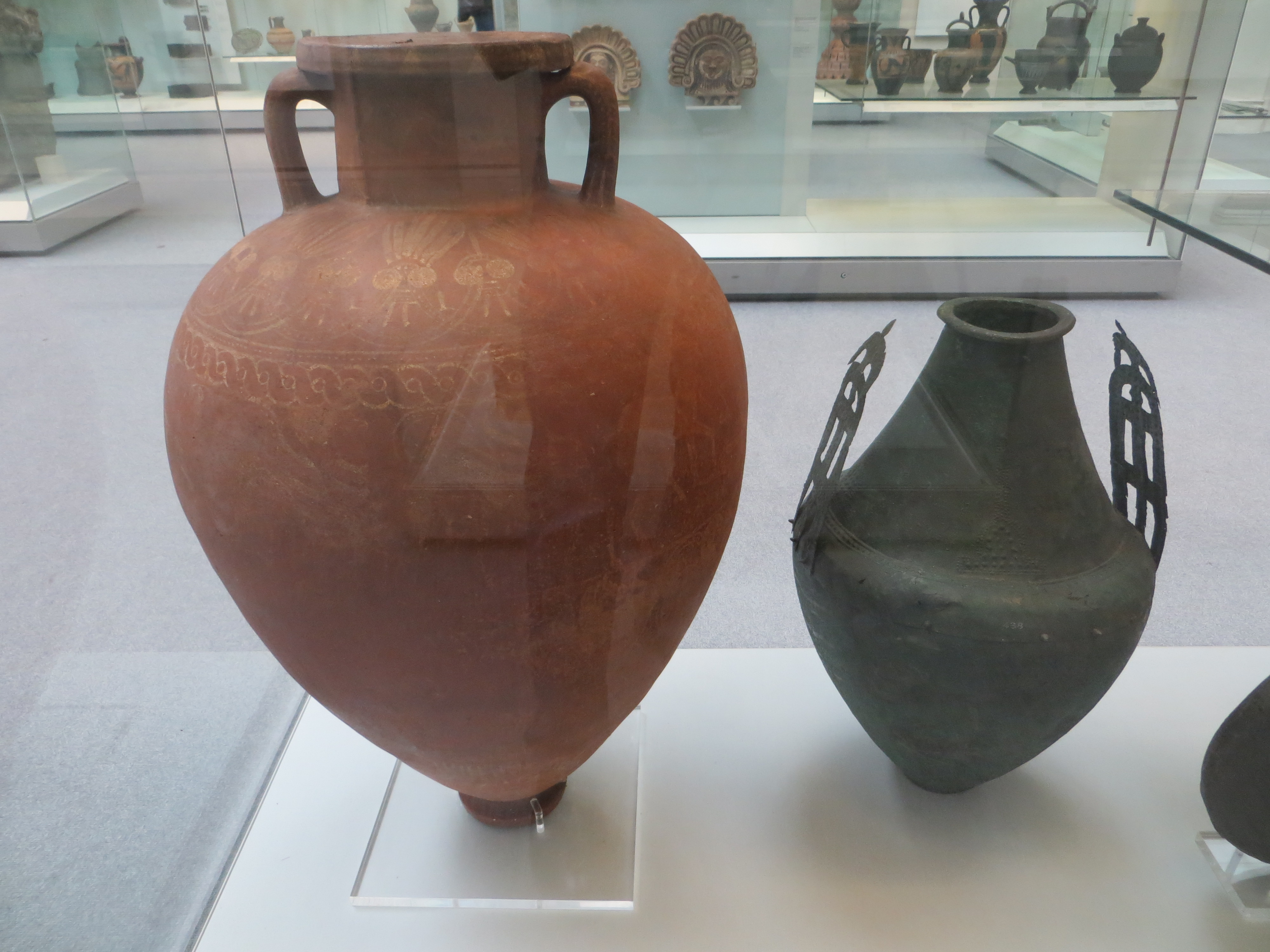
Large storage-jar or amphora with painted decoration and a bronze biconical cinerary urn

== Bibliography ==
- Friederike Bubenheimer-Erhart, Das Isisgrab von Vulci : eine Fundgruppe der Orientalisierenden Periode Etruriens (Wien : Verlag der österreichischen Akademie der Wissenschaften, 2012)
- L. Burn, The British Museum Book of Greek and Roman Art (British Museum Press, 1991)
- S. Walker, Roman Art (British Museum Press, 1991)
