= Vulci =

Etruscan city near Rome

- Volci, Velch, Velx
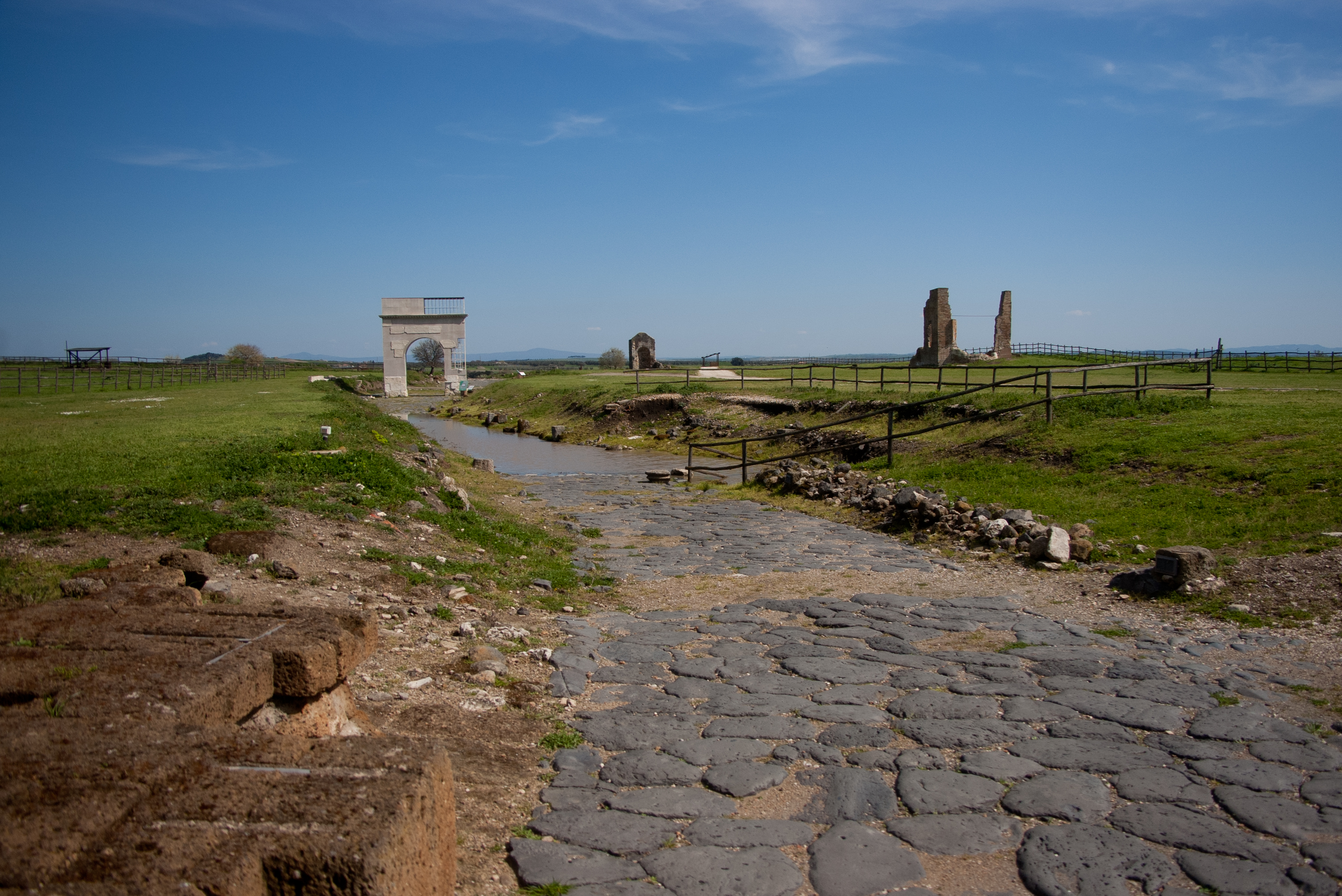
- The archaeological site of Vulci

- Location within Italy Location within Lazio
- 42°25′08″N 11°37′54″E
- Type: Settlement
- Location: Montalto di Castro, Canino, Province of Viterbo, Lazio, Italy
- Region: Latium

Site notes
- Owner: Public
- Management: Soprintendenza per i Beni Archeologici dell'Etruria Meridionale
- Public access: Yes
- Website: Vulci Archaeological Naturalistic Park(in Italian)-(in English)

Vulci or Volci (Etruscan: Velch or Velx, depending on the romanization used) was a rich Etruscan city in what is now northern Lazio, central Italy.

As George Dennis wrote, "Vulci is a city whose very name ... was scarcely remembered, but which now, for the enormous treasures of antiquity it has yielded, is exalted above every other city of the ancient world."

Vulci was located near the coast of the Tyrrhenian Sea about 80 km northwest of Rome, on the Fiora River, between Montalto di Castro and Canino. Remains of the city can be seen today.

The Vulci, like other Etruscans, became master sculptors in bronze as acknowledged by ancient writers. Although most large bronzes have been lost, there remain some magnificent examples of Etruscan bronze work such as the Chimera of Arezzo and the Monteleone chariot, possibly made in Vulci.

In the 19th century thousands of the ancient tombs of Vulci were discovered, and many were so well known and spectacular, such as the Tomb of the Sun and Moon, that they were included on the Grand Tour of Europe. From these tombs more Attic vases have been found in the Vulci tombs than at any other ancient site (at least by the 1850s) and many of these masterpieces as well as Etruscan bronzes have found their way into the major museums of the world where they can be seen today.

Despite these discoveries most of these tombs were later forgotten and lost.

== History ==
The Vulci were a tribe or people who gave their name to their city and were one of the legendary twelve peoples of Etruscan civilization who later formed the dodecapolis Etruscan League to protect their interests.

Although the wealth, magnificence and population of Vulci must have been among the first of Etruscan cities, it is mentioned only rarely in ancient literature or potential texts for some periods have been lost; hence the history of Vulci may be reconstructed mainly from archaeology.

In the Villanovan period, the wealth of metal resources in the Colline Metallifere hills was important in the development of trade especially with Sardinia. The most important discovery that testifies to the contact between Etruscans and Sardinians in this period was the Tomb of the Sardinian Bronzes in 1958 in the necropolis of Cavalupo, dated 850–800 BC, of a Sardinian woman of high rank. Among the funeral contents is a magnificent bronze statue of a warrior now in the National Etruscan Museum in the Villa Giulia. Numerous Villanovan fibulas have also been found in Sardinia.

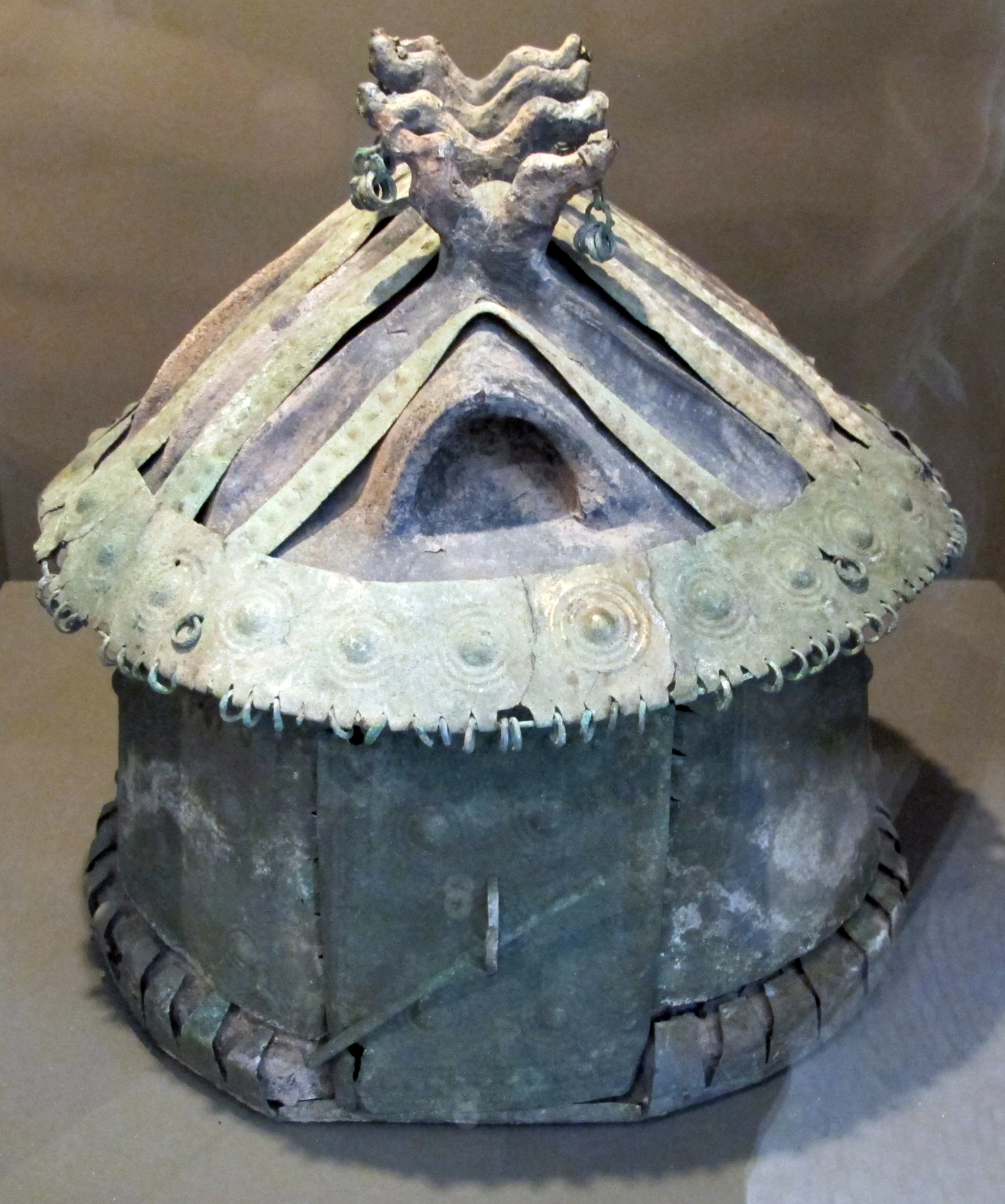
Cinerary urn in the form of a house, 8th c. BC, Vulci

Vulci's expansion in the Orientalising period of the 8th century BC is marked by the start of production of bronze objects such as covered urns in the shape of a house or cone, and the first of these products showed up in Greece towards the end of the century.

The 7th century is represented by the tomb of the Bronze Wagon, and in its later stages valuable and sophisticated products were imported from many Mediterranean markets showing the rise in wealth and culture of Vulci, whilst many Greeks came to live in Vulci as shown by the craftsmanship, manufacture and trade in fine ceramics (e.g. bucchero), bronze and gold.

Vulci's golden age of influence and wealth was in the 6th century BC when it ruled over the cities of Orbetello, Saturnia, Sovana, Castro, Pitigliano and Marsiliana. It became a centre of imports of refined Attic pottery, precious oriental balm, beautiful jewels of the most unusual shapes to satisfy its wealthy citizens, as is shown by the many masterpieces of Greek and Etruscan art from the tombs in national museums today. In return it exported its treasures throughout the Mediterranean: pottery, bronzes and wine.

The original port of Vulci was a quay on the river Fiora but the expansion of trade led it to build a larger coastal port at Regisvilla (or Regae) and it became a major maritime power although it was located some miles up the river, like Rome.

Originally the Etruscans were co-founders of Rome and they continued to dominate it. Vulci had some influence on early Rome, as Servius Tullius and the Vibenna brothers (Caile and Avle Vipinas) were from Vulci. Their names and pictures appear on a fresco in the François Tomb. After the population of Rome had become predominantly Italic, the Etruscan kings were overthrown.

After a time of crisis in the 2nd half of the 5th century, Vulci seems to have undergone a new expansion in the 4th century when the great tombs were built such as the François tomb.

The Roman–Etruscan Wars lasted many years before the Romans gained control over Etruria and the Etruscans were soundly defeated at Lake Vadimo in 310 and 283 BC. Nevertheless, Vulci was strong enough to further resist until Tiberius Coruncanius triumphed over Vulci in 280 BC and the colonia of Cosa was founded in its territory. The Romans took the coast from Vulci, cutting the base of their power which seems to have led to the decline of the city. The Etruscan league splintered apart during the war and the Etruscans were soon assimilated.

=== Roman Period ===
Vulci does not seem to have been of great importance in the remaining Roman period, even though the Romans built the Via Aurelia through it in 240 BC. However, large buildings in the city date to this period. A surviving milestone gives the distance to Rome as 70 milia passuum (miles). The road outside the north gate was repaved probably under Trajan's reign (early 2nd century AD), showing that it continued in good repair.

Later Vulci became an episcopal see. The final abandonment seems to be in the 8th century AD.

== Main sights ==
Recent excavations are discovering much more information on the history and importance of the city.

=== Necropolis ===
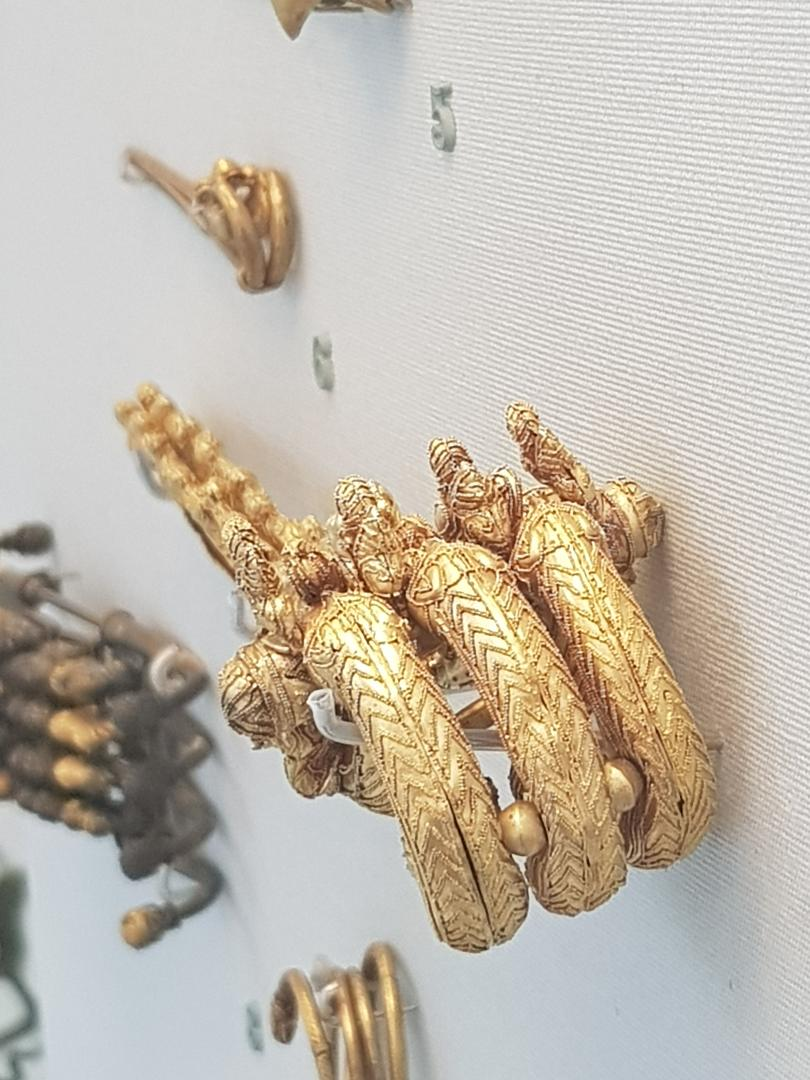
Gold fibula from Vulci in the British Museum

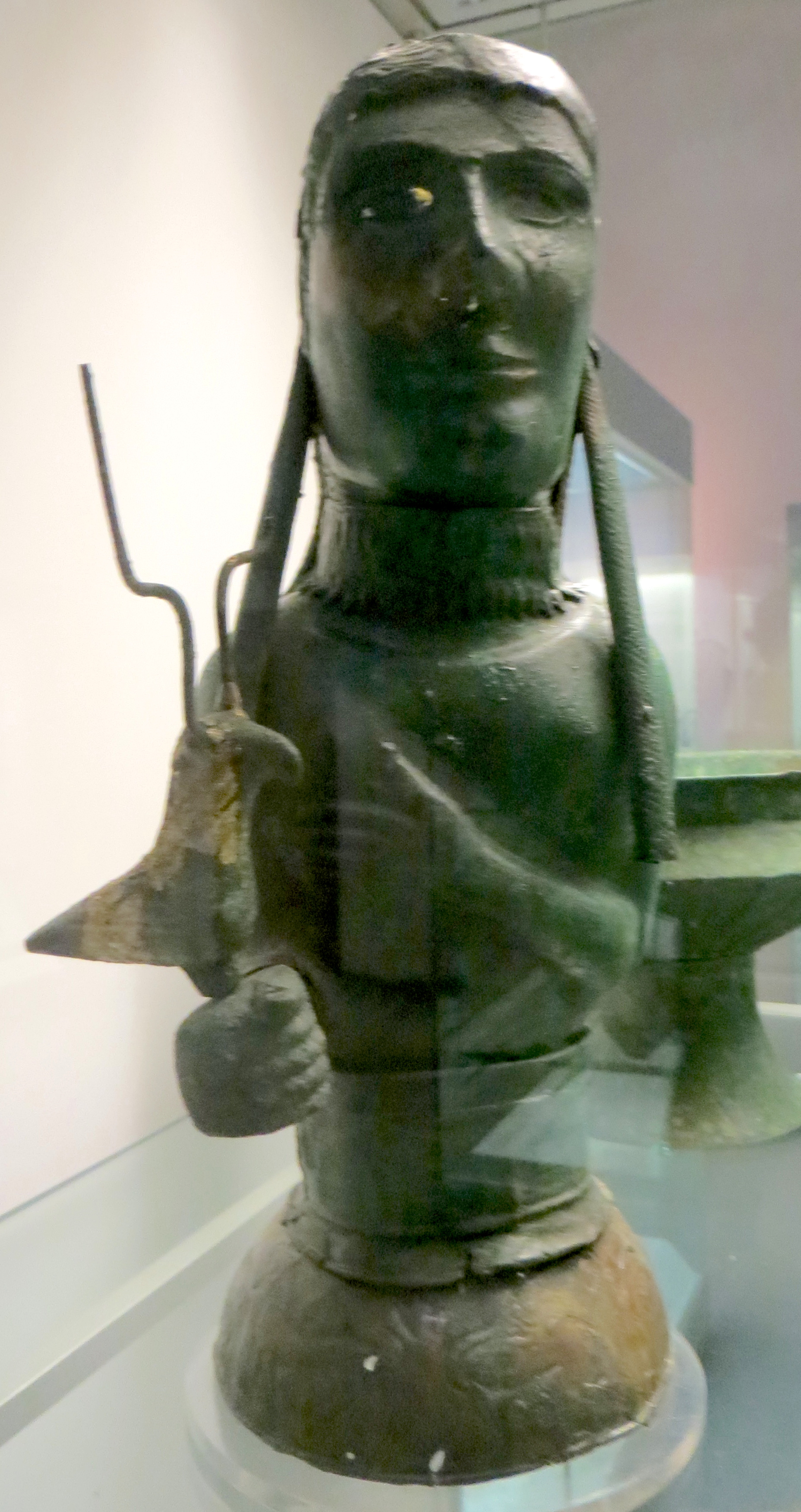
Bronze statue from the Isis Tomb in the British Museum.

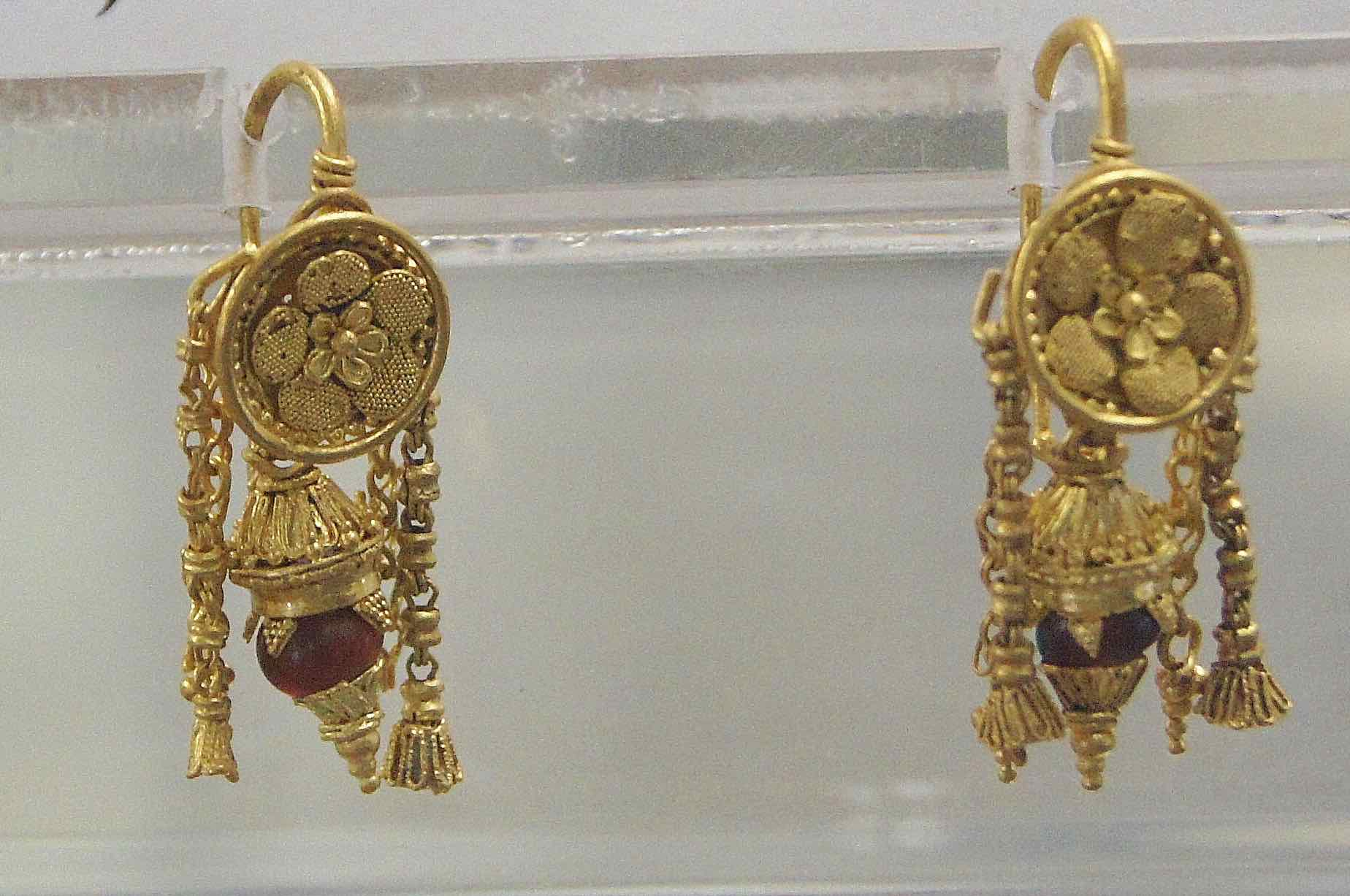
Gold earrings from a tomb.

The former wealth of the town was shown first by the discoveries made in its extensive necropoli starting from the 18th century - Greek vases, bronzes and other remains. From these tombs more Attic vases have been found in Vulci than at any other ancient site. Many of the finds were sold by the excavators and many found their way into the major museums of the world where they can be seen today.

The number of vases was large enough that many were destroyed in order to keep their value high.

In the 18th and 19th centuries many of the tombs were so well known and spectacular, such as the Tomb of the Sun and Moon, that they were included on the Grand Tour of Europe. Despite these discoveries most of these tombs were later forgotten and lost, except for the Cuccumella tomb, the largest tumulus mound in the whole of Etruria.

The astounding frescoes from the François Tomb, discovered in 1857, illustrating Greek and Etruscan myths, are considered some of the most celebrated of the Etruscans and are now in the National Etruscan Museum of the Villa Giulia in Rome. Another important burial chamber, the so-called Isis Tomb, proved to be a rich source of finds, most of which are now in the British Museum. The frescoes of the Hellenistic Tomb of the Bell-Ringers are preserved in the Archaeological Museum of Florence.

Recent excavations have brought to light more large and spectacular tombs such as the Tomb of the Silver Hands.

=== City walls ===
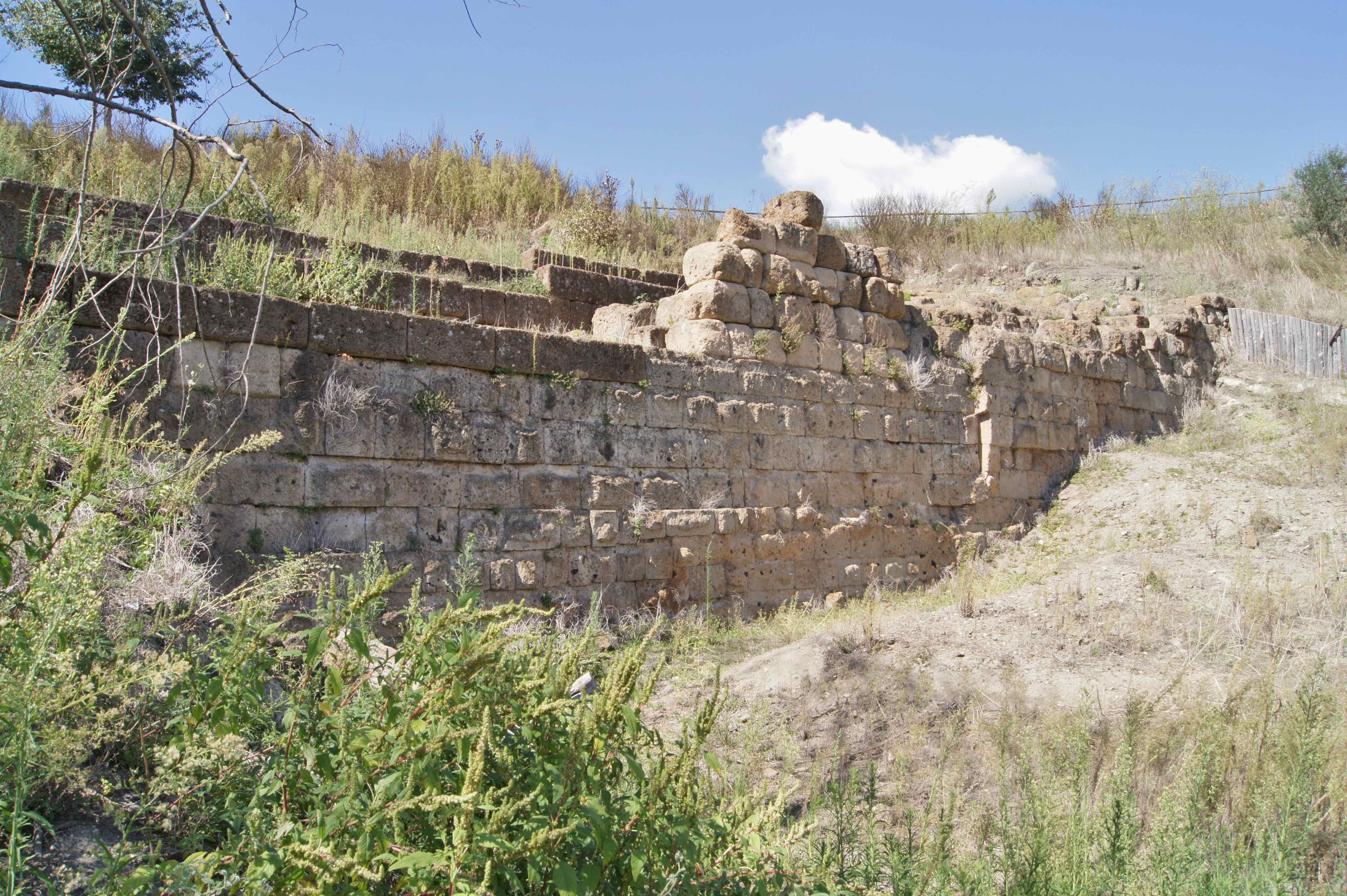
Etruscan city walls

The walls were built in the first half of the 4th c. BC before the wars with the Romans and are about 6.5 km in circumference. Several sections can be seen.

Three impressive and strong defensive gates of the five originals are now exposed. The remains of the north gate show an imposing defensive structure. On its west external side a votive ditch was discovered which was rich in materials documenting a cult linked to fertility dating from the Hellenistic era until the end of the first century AD. Near the ditch are tombs carved into a rocky bank. Not far away you can see the facing cross-linked by a building still to be explored.

The West Gate is the starting point of the Decumanus Maximus, the well-preserved east-west road of the city, paved with volcanic stone.

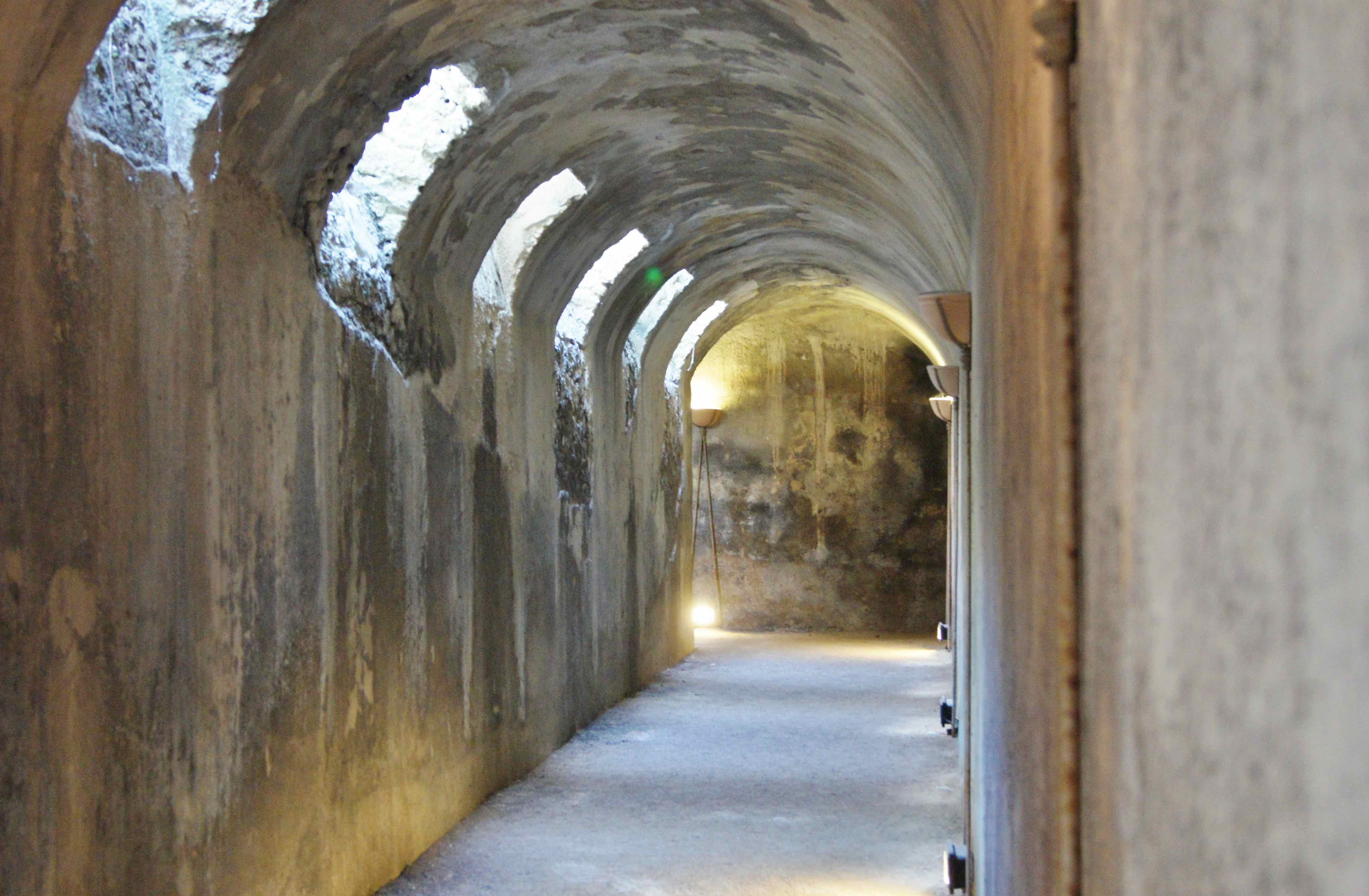
Cryptoporticus of the Villa

=== Villa of the Cryptoporticus ===
Along the decumanus is an area occupied by a large residential complex. The first building, a large domus north of the decumanus, is preceded by a series of small rectangular rooms, perhaps workshops (tabernae), overlooking the main street. Among these open the two entrances of the Villa (or Domus) of the Cryptoporticus, so named for its unusual and impressive underground rooms (cryptoporticus literally means covered porch, partly underground and was used in Roman architecture to build terraces or a covered market). It is a large and sumptuous private residence built in the classical style of noble Roman houses (domus with atrium and peristyle). Its earliest phase was the late 2nd and early 1st century BC and underwent numerous renovations in the Augustan period. Further changes were made between the Flavian and Hadrianic periods, while in late antiquity parts of the domus were partially reused. Later the area was abandoned and used as a cemetery from the discovery of tombs in the cellar.

The large main entrance leads into a vast atrium, around which are arranged various rooms, divided into bedrooms (cubicula) and living quarters (triclinia). A second entrance leads to a courtyard with a fountain in the centre, the result of the transformation of an original small lobby, probably in the late 1st century AD. This leads to the main lobby and then the rectangular peristyle surrounded by columns on all four sides. At the north-eastern corner of the peristyle are stairs giving access to the upper storey which is lost. The rich floor mosaic which dates from the first phase of the domus is still preserved; the mosaics of the two rooms that open onto the porch are dated to the Augustan age. The porch overlooks an apsidal nympheum which includes a swimming pool probably built in Imperial times.

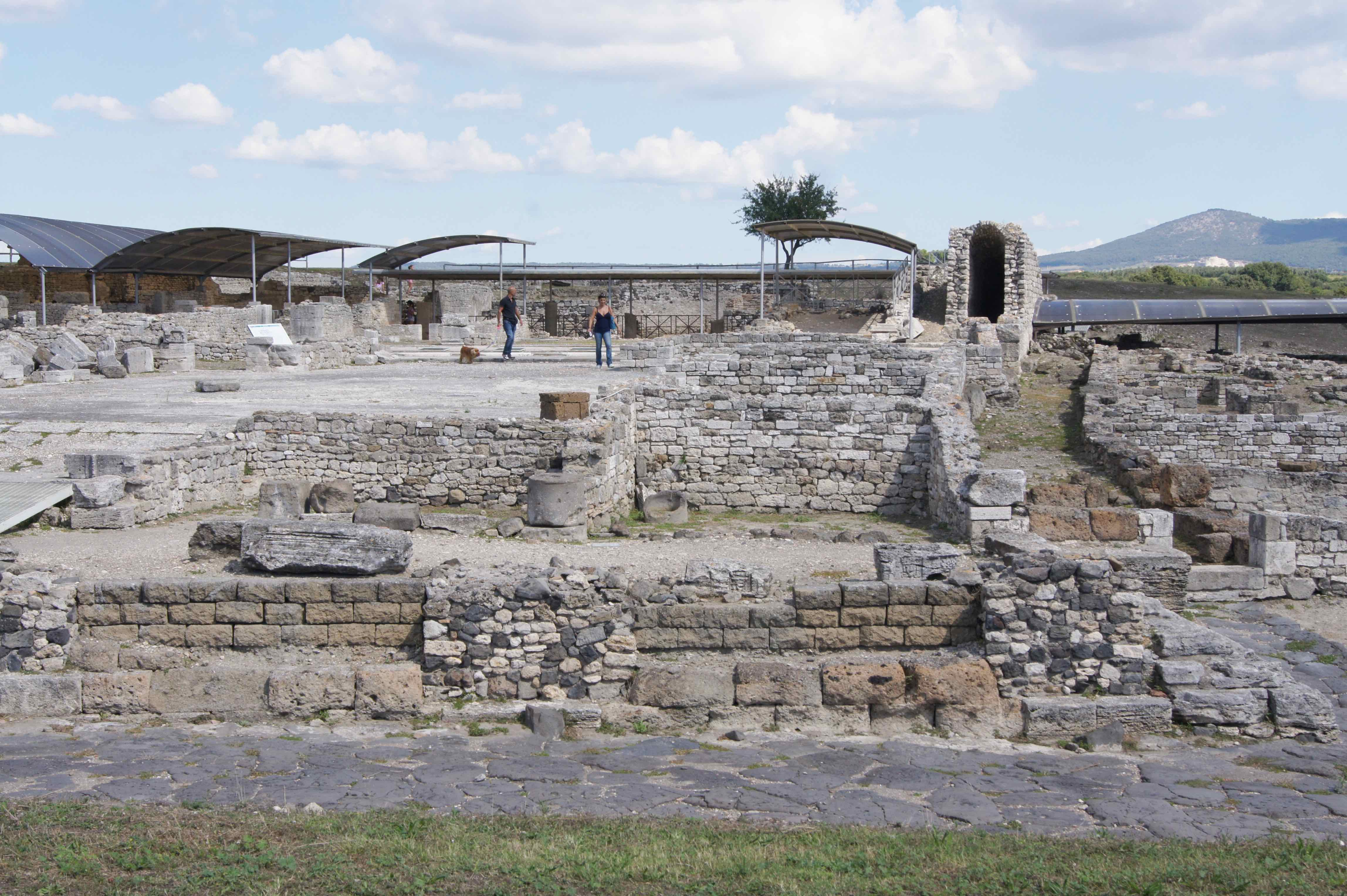
Roman Villa of the Cryptoporticus

In the north-western part are thermal baths that were reduced from four to three rooms in the restructuring of the Augustan age. They are composed of a dressing room (apodyterium), a heated air room (laconicum) and a room for hot water bath (calidarium), covered with intact mosaic floors supported on columns of bricks to allow the circulation of hot air. Areas immediately south of the baths were a general sector for services directly connected with the decumanus by a narrow private road.

The underground part of the house, the cryptoporticus, is accessed via a corridor to the east of the peristyle covered by a well preserved barrel vault. The underground environment was ventilated and lit from 18 windows that open at the level of the garden above. The function of the underground complex was especially the preservation of products such as wine and oil that needed a suitable environment.

Next to the north-western side of the domus is a series of rooms built probably in the Hellenistic age. It is a complex of two or more buildings of still uncertain date and use. They are characterised by the presence of works of canalisation and different types of paving, using brickwork, tiles and local stone.

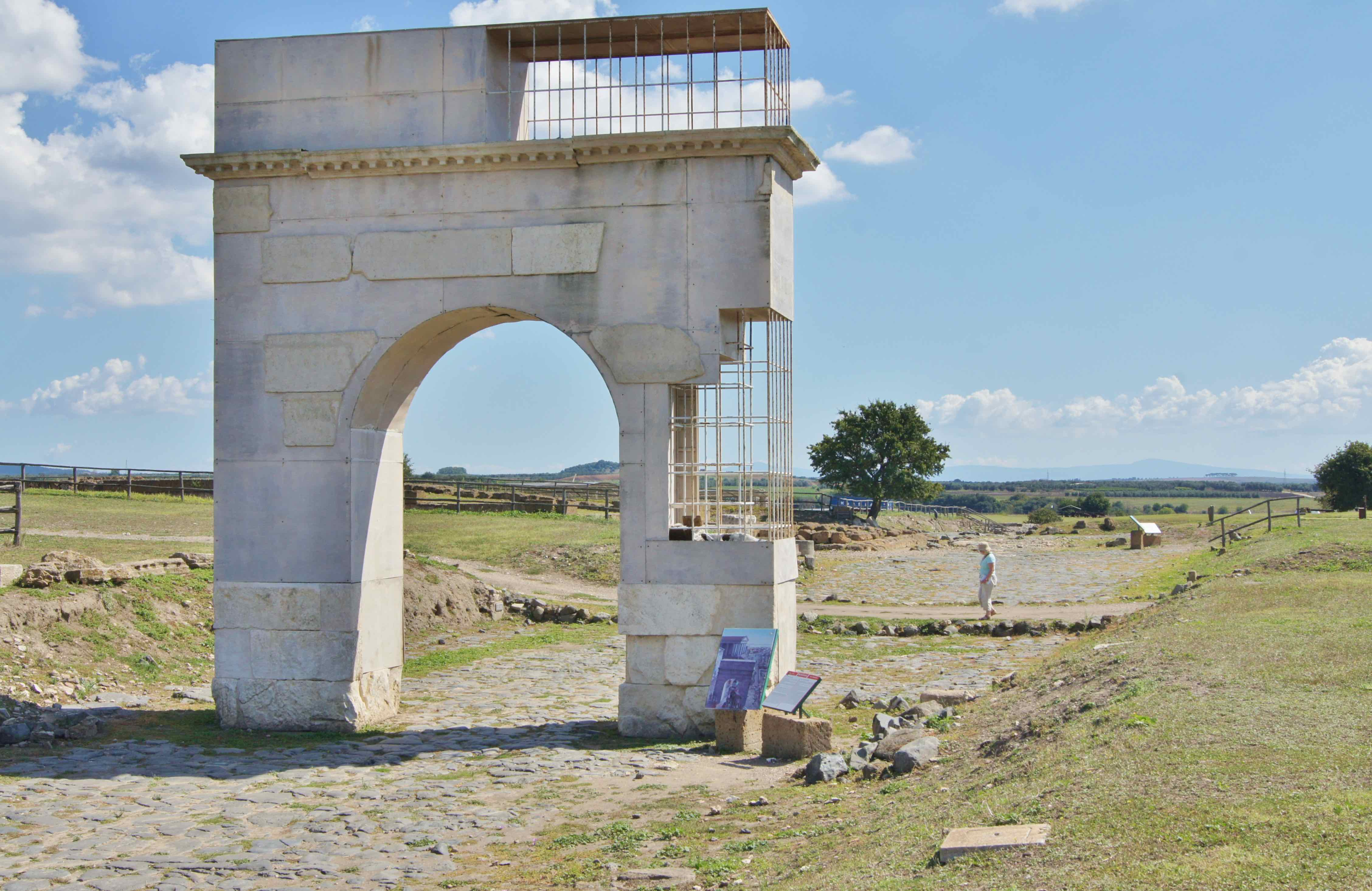
Roman arch of Publius Sulpicius Mundus (c.100 BC)

=== Roman Arch of Publius Sulpicius Mundus ===
In 2003 the foundations of a triumphal arch were discovered on the Decumanus at the west side of the Roman forum. Many fragments were found which allowed reconstruction of the arch, and a long inscription was also found which dedicated it to Publius Sulpicius Mundus who was a Roman senator in around 100 BC.

=== The Temple ===
The temple has an imposing base of sides 36.5 x 24.5 m. The temple had a continuous colonnade on all four sides, doubled on the front by four additional columns; it is preceded by a projection with a central staircase. The temple reveals at least two construction phases; the oldest (late 6th century BC) had numerous architectural terracottas with Ionic columns. In the early Roman Imperial age the temple was rebuilt, which involved the replacement of the wooden elements of the elevation with travertine structures and opus caementicium. Among the many elements of the elevation which have collapsed and are visible around the monument, a fragment of the architrave with inscription can be seen.

=== Late Roman Basilica ===
On the south side of the Decumanus is an apsidal rectangular building, believed to be a late Roman basilica. Originally with a gabled roof, it has a small apse and shows a combination of building techniques in the walls (especially in the east), such as opus reticulatum and opus incertum.

=== Ponte dell'Abbadia ===
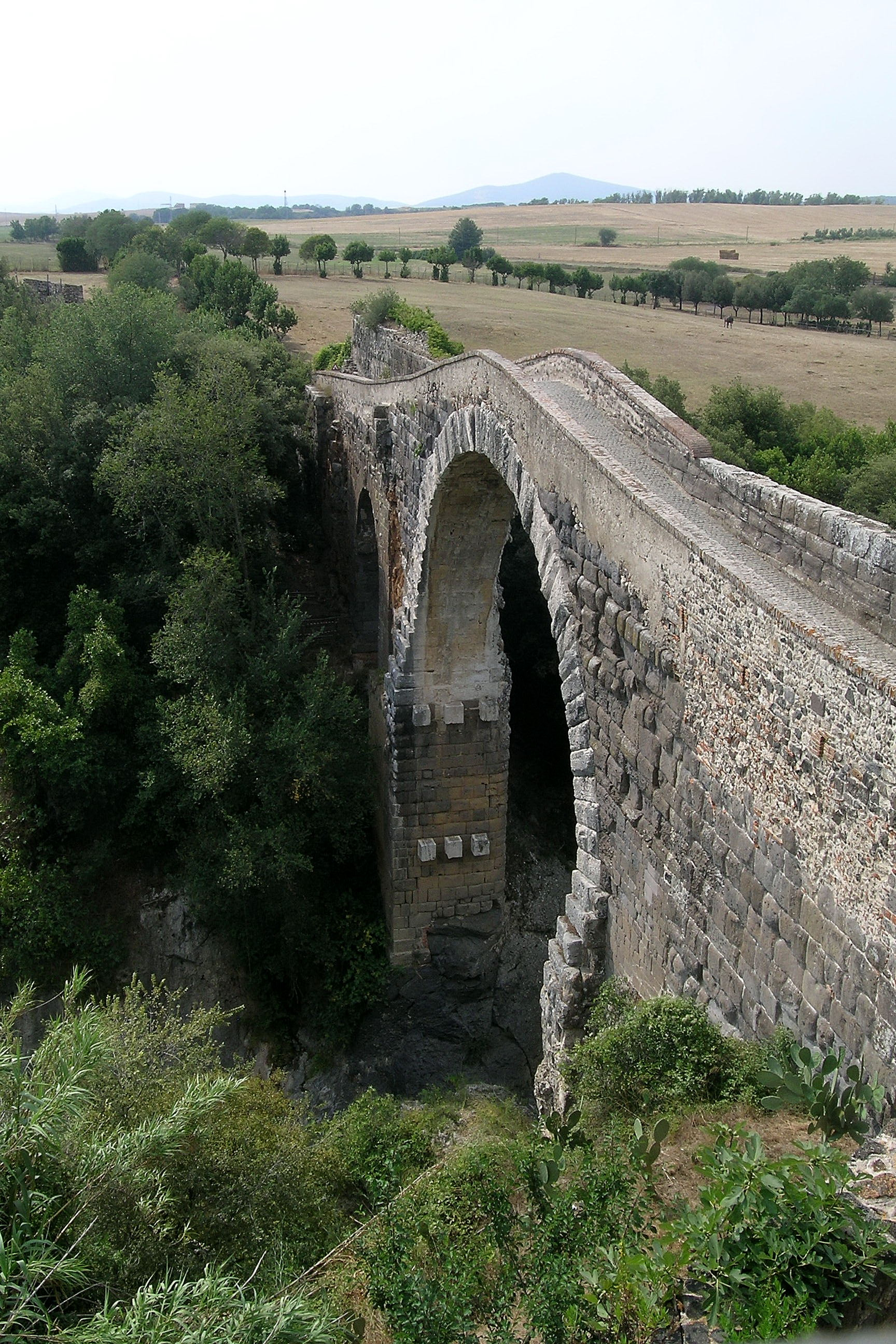
Ponte dell'Abbadia

The Ponte dell'Abbadia over the Fiora is a Roman bridge with a main arch of 20 m span and 30 m above the stream and was built upon an Etruscan bridge. (The Tufo buttresses are very probably Etruscan, for they are evidently the piers of the original bridge.) It carried the ancient road and the Romans, unusually, incorporated an aqueduct on it leading to Vulci about 1.5 km away. The overflow of the aqueduct after it fell into disrepair caused the "curtain of stalactites".

The waters still flow from an aqueduct into the gardens of the adjoining Castello dell'Abbadia.

The site also houses a mithraeum.

The site was described by George Dennis as follows:

It is verily a magnificent structure, bestriding the rocky abyss like a colossus, with the Fiora fretting and foaming at a vast depth beneath. But what means this extraordinary curtain of stalactites which overhangs the bridge on this side, depending in huge jagged masses from the parapet, and looking as though a vast cataract had rolled over the top of the bridge, and been petrified in its fall, ere it could reach the ground?....The stalactites stand out six or seven feet from the wall, and depend to a depth of fifteen or twenty feet. Independently of their remarkable conformation, their colouring — a clear yellowish white — combines, with the grey or reddish masonry, to add to the effect of the bridge.

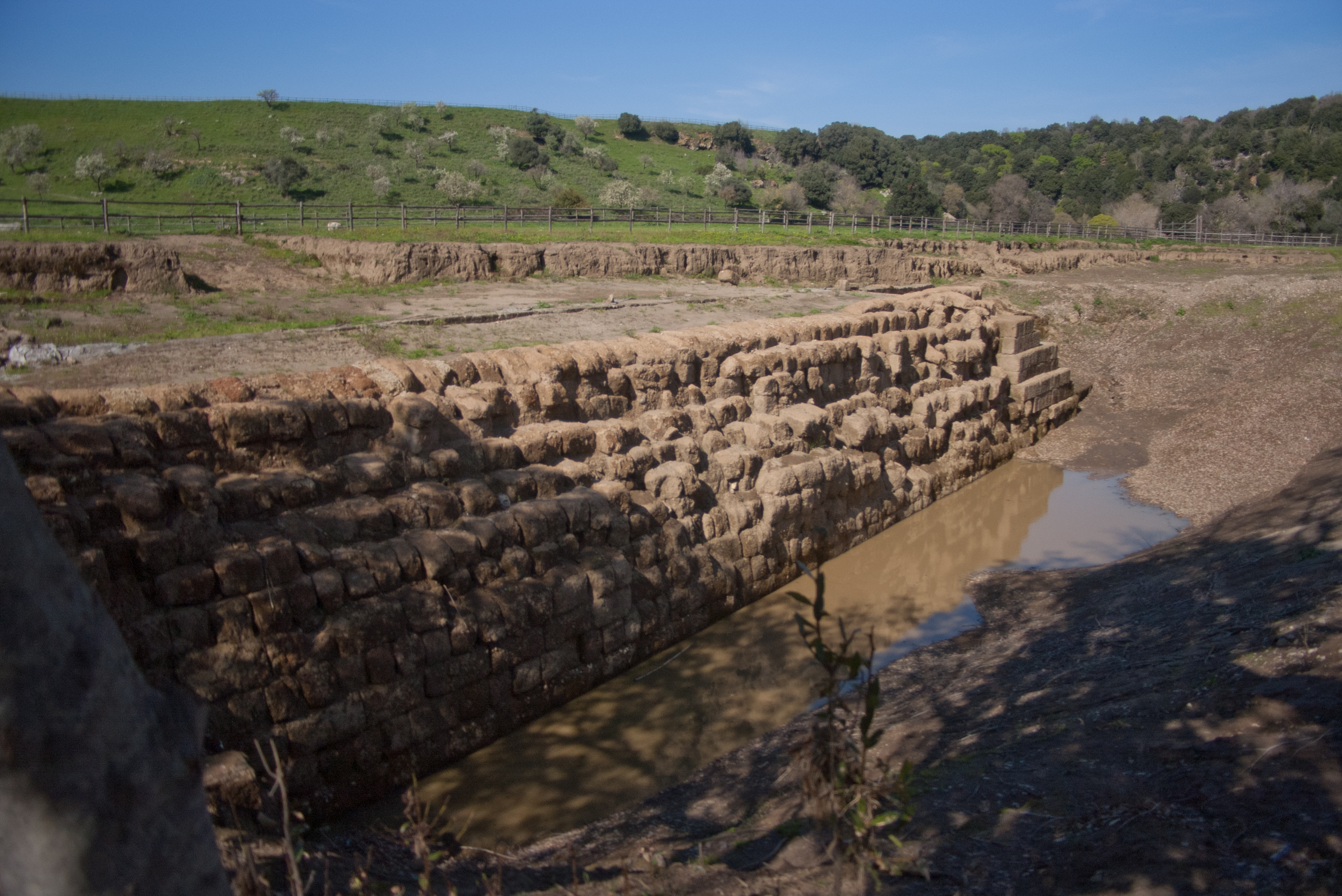
Ancient Etruscan quay on the river Fiora

== Museum ==
The Archaeological Museum of Vulci is located in the Castello dell'Abbadia and houses an extensive collection of finds.

== Sources ==
- de Puma, Richard D. 1986. Etruscan Tomb Groups: Ancient Pottery and Bronzes in Chicago’s Field Museum of Natural History. Mainz: von Zabern.
- Haynes, Sybille. 1991. "The Bronze Bust from the “Isis Tomb” Reconsidered." Studi Etruschi 57: 3–9.
- Holliday, Peter. 1993. "Narrative Structures in the François Tomb", in Narrative and Event in Ancient Art By Peter Holliday, 175–97. Cambridge, UK: Cambridge University Press.
- Klinger, Sonia. 2013. "Underworld Demons on an Early Fifth Century BCE Etruscan Black-Figure Stamnos from Vulci, now in Berlin." Etruscan Studies 16, no. 1: 39–74.
- Pettoello, Giulia. 2016. "Multisensory Museum: A Proposal for Personalized Virtual Knowledge of the Vulci Archaeological Park." Disegnare Con 9, no. 17: 1–10.
- Riccioni, Giuliana. 1979. "Vulci: A Topographical and Cultural Survey." In Italy before the Romans: The Iron Age, Orientalizing, and Etruscan periods. Edited by David Ridgway and Francesca R. Ridgway, 241–76. New York: Academic Press.
- Riis, P. J. 1998. Vulcientia Vetustiora: A Study of Archaic Vulcian Bronzes. Copenhagen: Royal Danish Academy of Sciences and Letters.
- Rowland, Ingrid. 2007. "Marriage and Mortality in the Tetnies Sarcophagi." Etruscan Studies 11: 151–64.
- Turfa, Jean MacIntosh. 2005. Catalogue of the Etruscan gallery of the University of Pennsylvania Museum of Archaeology and Anthropology. Philadelphia: University of Pennsylvania Museum of Archaeology and Anthropology.
- Van Kampen, Iefke. 2007. "A Workshop of Stone Sculpture Production in South Etruria: La Bottega del Gruppo di San Donato." Etruscan Studies 10: 35–46.
