= Lydos =

6th-century BC Greek vase painter

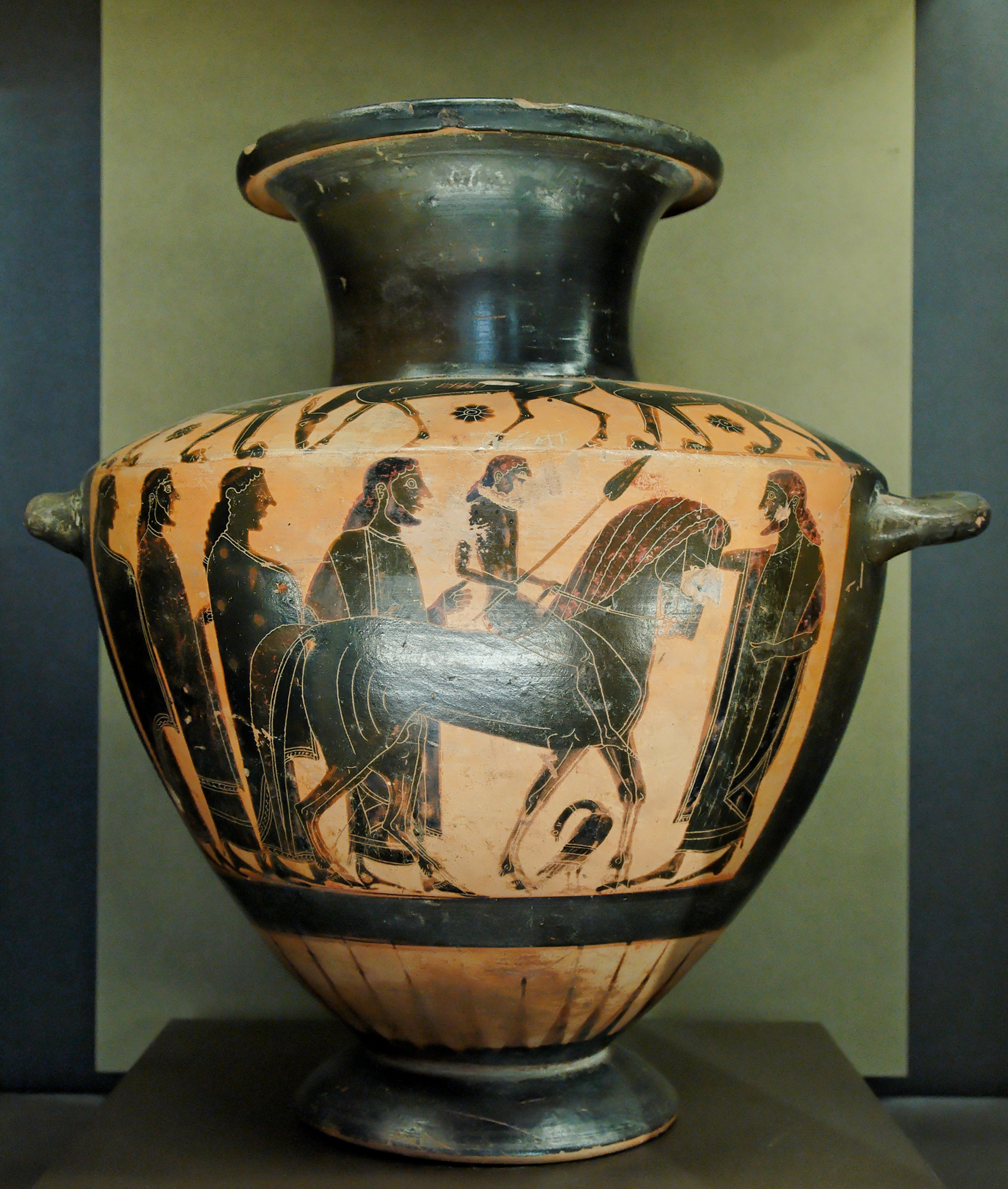
- Warrior departure, hydria by Lydos, dated about 570/560 BC, located in Paris, the Louvre, E 804
- Born: Unknown. Lydos is an ethnic name. Before 560 BC. Lydia or Athens.
- Died: About 540 BC
- Known for: Vase painting
- Notable work: He preferred to work on Kraters and Amphorae
- Movement: Black-figure style, leader of the Lydos Group

Lydos (Greek: Λυδός, the Lydian) was an Attic vase painter in the black-figure style. Active between about 560 and 540 BC, he was the main representative of the "Lydos Group". His signature, ό Λυδός, ho Lydos ("the Lydian"), inscribed on two vases, is informative regarding the cultural background of the artist. Either he immigrated to Athens from the Lydian Empire of King Kroisos, or he was born in Athens as the son of Lydian parents. In any case, he learned his trade in Athens.

== Style ==
It is difficult to definitely recognise his work, since he was the centre and main artist of a highly productive Attic pottery workshop. For that reason, many vases are simply described as "in the style of Lydos". Several other individual artists within his circle can be identified, including the Painter of Vatican 309 and Painter of Louvre F 6. These works are quite homogeneous in style, but differ considerably in terms of quality.

The style of Lydos strongly resembles that of older artists, such as the painters of Siana cups, of which he himself painted many. He was the last Attic painter to decorate large vases entirely with polychrome animal friezes in the Corinthian style. His human figures resemble the works of Klitias, and later painters, whose humans appear "wrapped" in cloth. Sometimes they have dotted garments, such as preferred by the Amasis Painter. His figures exude a dignity nearly akin to those by Exekias. The Lydos Group did not only paint large vases, but also known for miniature work. For example, they painted Little-Master cup and eye-cups. Ascribed to Lydos himself is a band cup potted by Nikosthenes.

His early works show a tendency to use colour, which decreased throughout his career. Similarly, at an early stage he paid much attention to certain details, such as the hairy backs of cat-like animals, whereas later he concentrated more on gesture. His animal figures appear somewhat stiff, but are usually highly decorative. Lydos painted vases by a variety of potters, including Nikosthenes, Kolchos, Epitimos and Amasis.

His workshop's style can be described as out-of-date but was used well into the 520s BC. It is not clear why that is the case; perhaps the material was aimed at older or poorer customers. The last artist to resemble Lydos in style was the Ready Painter.

== Themes ==
Lydos frequently painted mythological scenes and newly introduced several specific motifs of that genre to Attic vase painting. The quality of his paintings varies. He often painted so-called "penguin women", wearing a cloak held together by the chest, probably by a kind of sash, and terminating in a tail-like feature at the back. His men often wore a himation, painted in diagonal stripes, so that they appear as if bandaged. An oinochoe, the vessel itself made by the potter Kolchos (Berlin, Antikensammlung, F 1732) depicts mannerist figures. Athena (supporting Heracles, who is fighting Kyknos) is rendered as a silhouette figure in the style of the Amasis Painter, while the figures of Ares and Zeus (who joins the fighting) represent an attempt to utilise the new three-dimensional drawing style, developed around 540 BC. Lydos's palmettes, placed on neck and handles of the vessel are stylistically transitional: they can be seen as a late form of the earlier black-figure style, but also as the beginning of the decorative styles that were to flourish in red-figure vase painting. His best works also include several plates decorated with flying or running figures. One of his plates is decorated with a gorgoneion covering the entire surface.

== Works ==
Works ascribed to Lydos can be found on all types of vase shape then produced in the Athenian potters' quarter, including a series of grave pinakes.

One of his two signed vases is a dinos, preserved only in fragments and found on the Athenian Acropolis. In style it resembles the works of the Painter of Acropolis 606 and Nearchos. The main frieze depicts a very carefully designed Gigantomachy. Subsidiary friezes show a procession a hunt and various animals. Especially striking aspects of the work are a number of details and the colouring. Lydos painted a wasp as a shield emblazonment and dangerous-looking knives in the procession scene. These martial aspects are balanced by the high-quality animal friezes.

Another well-known work by him is a column krater, now in the Metropolitan Museum, New York City. It is nearly as large as the François Vase, but is decorated only with a single frieze, so that the figures reach a height of nearly 25 cm. The painter focused not so much on the depicted narrative (return of Hephaistos), but on the gestures of the figures Dionysos and Hephaistos, and even more so of the accompanying satyrs and maenads. He omitted circumstantial detail, as used e.g. by Klitias, and failed to present the satyrs genitals as the Amasis Painter would have. Instead, his satyrs are depicted as “gentlemen”.

Some particular works are as follows.

- Malibu, J. Paul Getty Museum

Amphora 86.AE.60

- New York, Metropolitan Museum

Column Krater 31.11.11

- Paris, Louvre

five vases

== See also ==
- National Archaeological Museum of Athens

== Bibliography ==
- John Beazley: Attic Black-Figure Vase-Painters, Oxford 1956, p. 107-120.
- Michael A. Tiverios: Ο Λυδός και το έργο του. Συμβολή στην έρευνα της αττικής μελανόμορφης αγγειογραφίας, Athen 1976
- John Boardman: Schwarzfigurige Vasen aus Athen. Ein Handbuch, Mainz 1977, ISBN 3-8053-0233-9, p. 57-59.
- Bettina Kreuzer: Lydos, in: Künstlerlexikon der Antike Vol. 2, 2004, p. 23-24.
