= Maker's mark =

Mark identifying the maker of an object

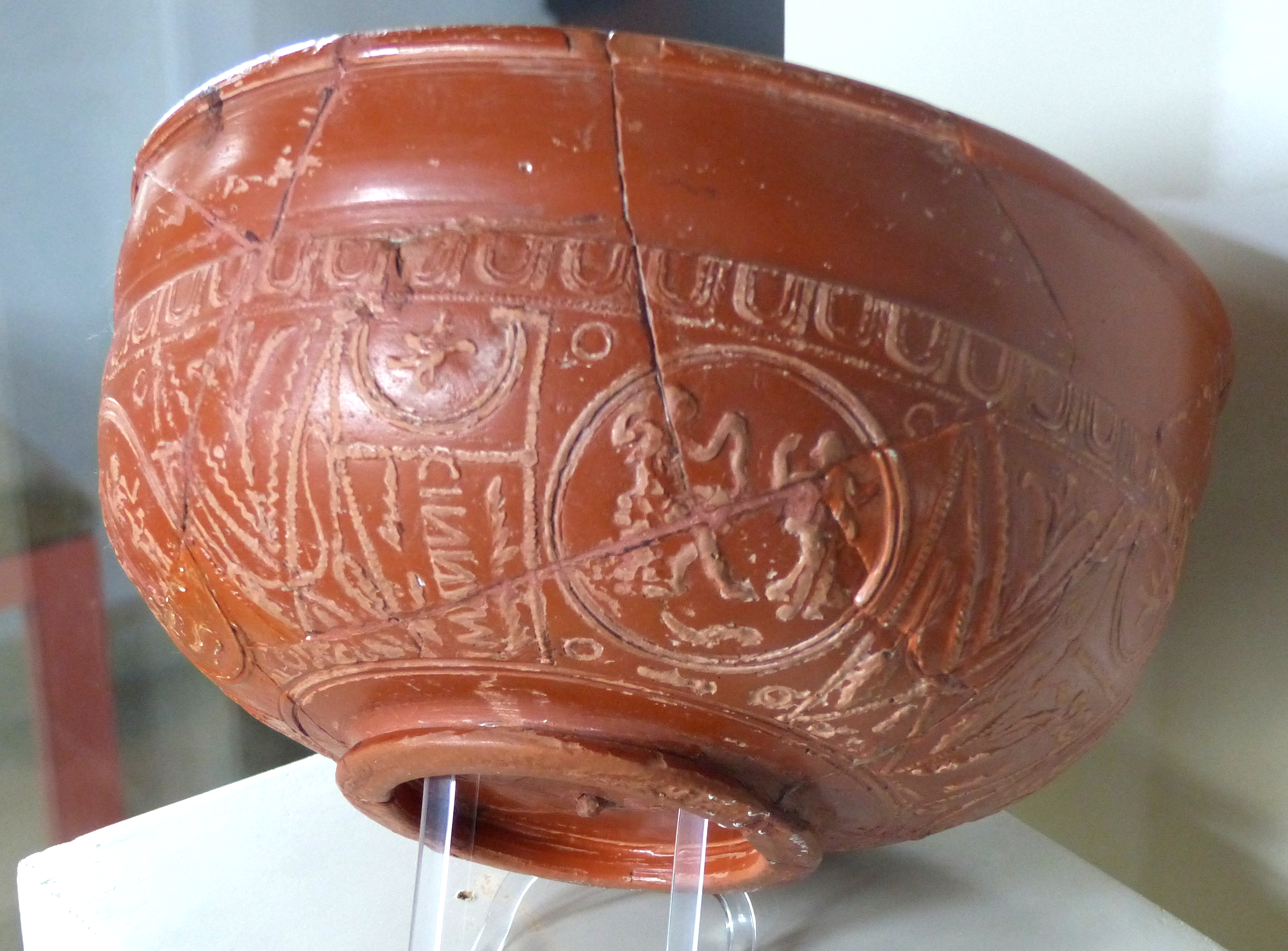
Potter Cinnamus had added his maker's mark to the decoration of the Roman Samian ware bowl (to the left and below the center)

A maker's mark is a mark placed on an object to identify its maker or workshop. In metalworking, it may be struck into the metal with a punch, engraved or cast. On gold and silver work, it often consists of the maker's initials. It identifies the workshop responsible for the object, which may have been made by the master or by a journeyman. On pottery, marks may be stamped or incised in the clay, or painted under or over the glaze.

== History and use ==
Maker's marks were used by goldsmiths and silversmiths in medieval Europe, alongside marks used by towns to control the quality of their work. They remained in use until the end of the guilds.

=== Gold and silver ===
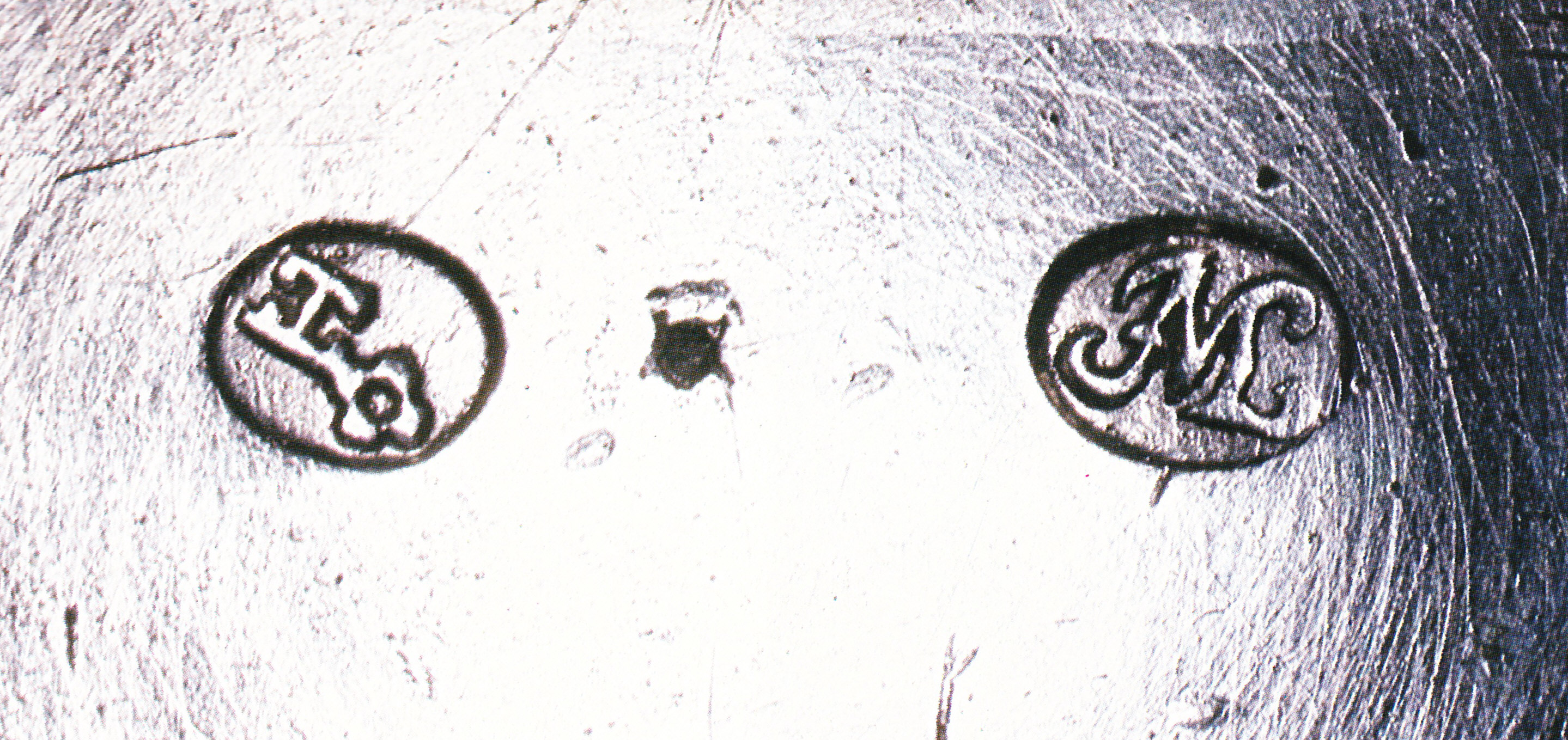
Maker's mark JML (Jacob Müller) next to Bremen's town mark (key), around 1690

In England, a statute of 1363 ordained that every master goldsmith should have a mark of his own, known to those appointed by the king to survey their work. The mark was to be set on his works after they had been assayed, or tested for their metal content. These makers' marks were at first emblems or symbols, such as a fish, a bird, a heart, a cross or a flower. After a time, letters were used as the worker's mark.

The custom of using symbols alone gradually fell into disuse in the seventeenth century. Symbols with letters either above, below or between them were used down to the middle of the eighteenth century. A crown or coronet placed over two letters remained in use as late as the last quarter of the nineteenth century.

An account of Goldsmiths' Hall published in 1677 described the registration of workers' marks. The workers' marks, generally their initials, were struck in lead, with their owners' names entered opposite them on parchment or vellum. The wardens required the marks to be plain and of a fit size, and not one like another. In 1905, Charles James Jackson noted the difficulty of assigning a name to an early maker's mark unless it could be identified in a contemporary account or inventory.

In early modern Paris, a goldsmith applied a registered mark containing his initials and a symbol before submitting an object for assay. A separate mark was added by a guild warden if the silver met the required standard.

In America, during colonial times, the maker's mark, initials or name was often the only mark, without any guide as to date. On nineteenth-century American silver, the word sterling was stamped on the article together with the name or mark of the maker.

=== Pewter ===
Multiple maker's marks on a pewter plate

Pewterers used personal marks called touch marks, often containing their names or initials. In 1382, the pewterers of Paris were forbidden to sell hammered wares made in the city or its suburbs without first stamping them with their mark. In England, a statute of 1503–1504 required makers of salts and pots made from the pewter known as lay metal to mark them with their own marks.

The touch marks varied in size according to the articles on which they were stamped. The smallest punches were used on spoons, and those of larger size on dishes and chargers, or large serving plates. Makers used initials and devices such as a hand, a heart, a dolphin or a dog. A mark was sometimes stamped over with the name or initials of another maker. In marking their larger tankards, German pewterers were in the habit of stamping the touch three times.

A pewter plate by Zacharias Neff, dated about 1750–1780 and held by the Stadtmuseum Einbeck, has three maker's marks under its base. Two show an angel with a sword and scales; the third shows a leaping deer. The maker's name appears on the marks.

=== Ironwork and armor ===
Maker's marks also occur on ironwork, including medieval knives and swords. European armorers used individual marks as well as town marks. Charles ffoulkes's catalogue of 1912 illustrates marks attributed to Konrad Seusenhofer and Anton Peffenhauser, alongside marks of the cities of Augsburg and Nuremberg.

Armor could also bear marks of inspection. In London, regulations of 1347 forbade helmets and other arms forged by the hammer from being offered for sale until they had been properly tested by the wardens and marked with their marks.

=== Japan ===
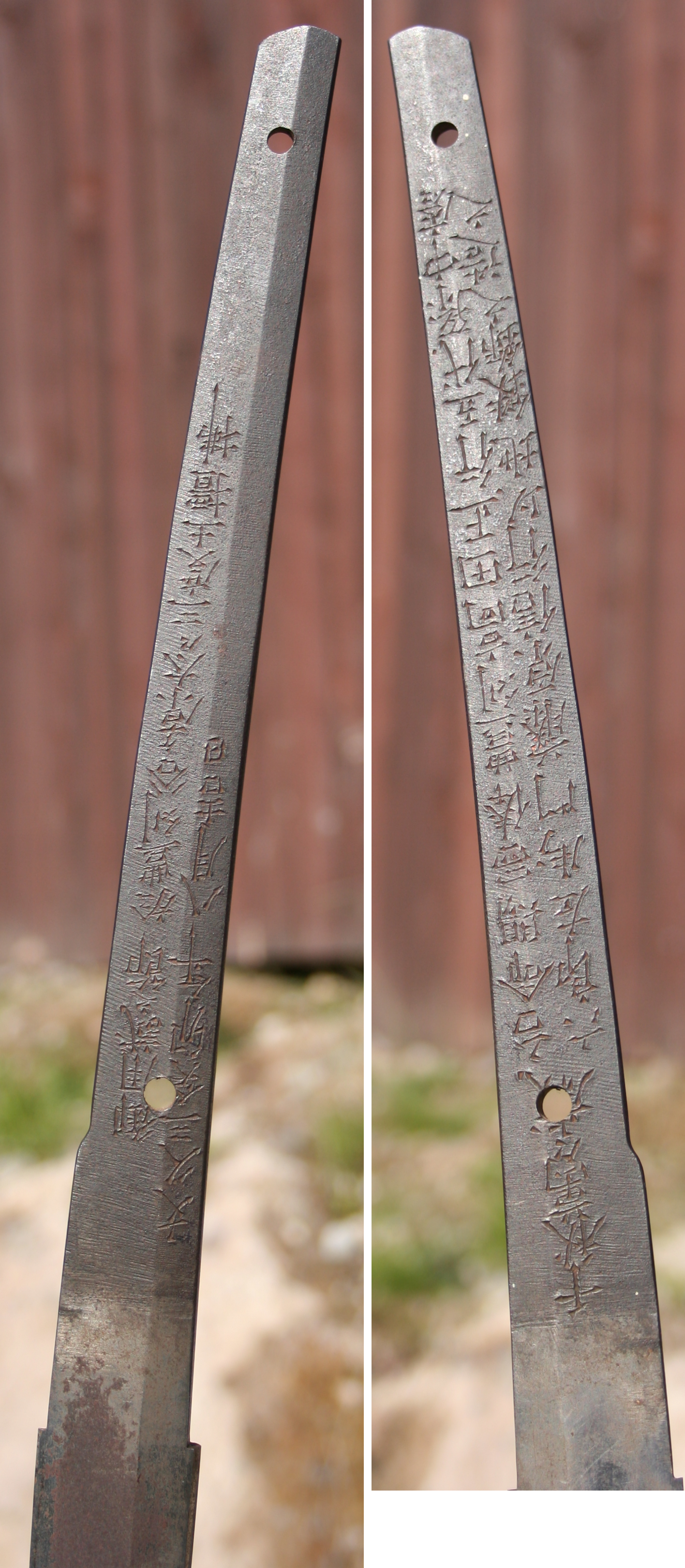
Tang (back end) of a Japanese blade with signature (mei) between the mounting holes

In Japan, workers in iron engraved their names upon sword blades and sword guards. Manufacturers of mirrors cast their names upon the objects they made. Mirror makers also assumed the family names of noble families, which they used in conjunction with their own names. James Lord Bowes illustrated an inscription combining the assumed name Fujiwara with the maker's name Mitsushige.

=== Pottery ===
Marks on pottery and porcelain include factory names and the signatures of potters, painters or gilders, with or without dates and descriptive notes. They are placed in some inconspicuous place, occasionally in the design, but generally under the base of the piece. Under-glaze marks may be stamped or incised in the body of the ware while it is still soft, or painted under the glaze. Over-glaze marks are painted over the glaze.

Some marks are merely workmen's signs, pattern marks or numbers, which need other evidence to identify the origin of the piece. Many factories borrowed each other's marks or adopted signs similar to those of more famous works.

On ancient Greek vases, the signature usually gives the potter's name with ἐποίησεν ('made'), or the painter's with ἔγραψεν ('painted'). The two may be combined under one name, as with Exekias, or give separate names, as on the François Vase, signed by Kleitias as painter and Ergotimos as potter.

Marks on Japanese pottery included the signature of the artist or the seal of the factory, together with, in many cases, the name of the kiln, town and province.

At the Rookwood Pottery in Cincinnati, marks were of five kinds: factory marks, clay or body marks, size marks, process marks and decorators' marks. It was customary for the decorators to cut their initials or monograms on the bottoms of pieces painted by them.

== Factory and responsibility marks ==
The rise of factory marks (at the expense of the marks of actual makers) took place in many industries from the 17th century. De Munck links this to changes in the labor relations and methods of production (molds for earthenware, for example, reduced potters to low-skilled laborers). In modern precious-metal hallmarking, the maker's mark might identify an entity that submitted the item for assaying (not necessarily the manufacturer), so the official term is the responsibility mark (or sponsor's mark in the UK and Ireland).

== Modern Germany ==
Maker's marks remain in use among German gold- and silversmiths. In Germany, goods sold as silver, gold or platinum are not required to bear fineness (purity) marks or company or maker's marks. The use of fineness marks on gold and silver goods is regulated by law. When gold or silver utensils are given a fineness stamp, the stamp must also identify the business for which the stamping was carried out.

== See also ==
- Factory mark
- Silver hallmarks
- Pewter mark
- Blacksmith's mark

== Sources ==
- Barber, Edwin Atlee (1904). Marks of American Potters. Philadelphia: Patterson & White Company.
- Bremer-David, Charissa (2023). French Silver in the J. Paul Getty Museum (PDF) (1st ed.). Los Angeles: J. Paul Getty Museum. ISBN 978-1-60606-831-1.
- Bowes, James Lord (1882). Japanese Marks and Seals. London: Henry Sotheran & Co.
- Buck, J. H. (1888). Old Plate, Ecclesiastical, Decorative, and Domestic: Its Makers and Marks. New York: The Gorham Manufacturing Company.
- Burton, W.; Hobson, R. L. (1909). Handbook of Marks on Pottery & Porcelain. London: Macmillan and Co.
- De Munck, Bert (December 2012). "The agency of branding and the location of value. Hallmarks and monograms in early modern tableware industries". Business History. 54 (7): 1055–1076. doi:10.1080/00076791.2012.683422. eISSN 1743-7938. ISSN 0007-6791. S2CID 218587496.
- "Gesetz über den Feingehalt der Gold- und Silberwaren" [Act on the fineness of gold and silver goods]. Gesetze im Internet (in German). FeinGehG.
- ffoulkes, Charles (1912). The Armourer and His Craft from the XIth to the XVIth Century. London: Methuen & Co.
- Goldschmiede-Innung Sachsen-Anhalt. "Geschichte" [History]. Goldschmiede-Innung Sachsen-Anhalt (in German).
- Goldsmiths' Company Assay Office. "What is a Hallmark?".
- Hallmarking Convention. "Glossary".
- Jackson, Charles James (1905). English Goldsmiths and Their Marks. London: Macmillan and Co.
- London Museum. "Knife set, knife & sheath". London Museum. Object ID A1956.
- London Museum. "Sword". London Museum. Object ID C2507.
- Massé, H. J. L. J. (1921). The Pewter Collector: A Guide to English Pewter with Some Reference to Foreign Work. New York: Dodd, Mead and Company.
- Pewter Society. "Touch marks". The Pewter Society.
- Stadtmuseum Einbeck. "Zinn / Teller / Zacharias Neff" [Pewter / Plate / Zacharias Neff]. Kulturerbe Niedersachsen (in German). SME A 16886.
- Walters, H. B. (1905). History of Ancient Pottery: Greek, Etruscan, and Roman. Vol. II. New York: Charles Scribner's Sons.
- Wissenschaftliche Dienste (25 July 2018). Die deliktische Haftung im Rahmen des Handels mit Gold- und Silberwaren: Das Gesetz über den Feingehalt der Gold- und Silberwaren als Schutzgesetz im Sinne des § 823 Abs. 2 BGB [Tort liability in the trade in gold and silver goods: The Act on the fineness of gold and silver goods as a protective statute under section 823(2) of the German Civil Code] (PDF) (in German). Deutscher Bundestag. WD 7 – 3000 – 161/18.
