= 570s BC =

Decade

This article concerns the period 579 BC – 570 BC.

== Events and trends ==
- 579 BC—Servius Tullius succeeds the assassinated Lucius Tarquinius Priscus as the sixth King of Rome (traditional date).
- 577 BC—Gedaliah, son of Achikam, is murdered by Ishmael, son of Kerach in Mizpa, Judea (Babylonian Empire).
- 575 BC—The Ishtar Gate and throne room wall are built in the city of Babylon.
- 575 BC—Battle of Yanling: The army of the Chinese State of Jin defeats the forces of the State of Chu in ancient Henan province.
- 575 BC–550 BC—Temples and public buildings begin to grace Rome. The main temple of Jupiter Optimus Maximus is built.
- 573 BC—The Nemean Games are founded at Nemea (traditional date).
- 573 BC—The Siege of Tyre ended. It was on-going for 13 years, it also had a significant connection with the Book of Ezekiel.
- 572 BC—The date of the earliest document in the Al-Yahudu Tablets, around 15 years after the destruction of the Solomon's Temple, during the reign of Nebuchadnezzar II.
- 571 BC (25 November)—Servius Tullius, king of Rome, celebrates a triumph for his victory over the Etruscans.
- 571 BC—Zhou Ling Wang becomes king of the Zhou dynasty of China.
- 570 BC—Amasis II succeeds Apries as king of Egypt.
- c. 570 BC—The François Vase, a volute krater with black figure decoration, is made by a pair of Greek craftsmen: the potter Ergotimos and the painter Kleitias.
- 570 BC—The Satrapy of Armenia is established as a province of the Achaemenid Empire. This is the first polity to bear the name Armenia.
- 570 BC–560 BC—Berlin Kore, from a cemetery at Keratea, near Athens, is made.

== Significant people ==
- 577 BC—Death of Duke Huan of Qin, Chinese ruler
- 576 BC—Birth of Cyrus the Great, later King of Anshan and architect of the First Persian Empire
- 573 BC—Death of Duke Li of Jin, ruler of the State of Jin
- 572 BC—Death of Zhou Jian Wang, king of the Zhou dynasty of China
- c. 571 BC—Death of Ezekiel, prophet in the Old Testament after whom the Book of Ezekiel is named.
- 570 BC—Birth of Xenophanes
- c. 570 BC—Birth of Pythagoras, Greek mathematician, on the island of Samos (died c. 475 BC)
- c. 570 BC—Death of Sappho, Greek poet
- Ergotimos—potter
- Kleitias—painter
