= Alessandro François =

Italian archaeologist (1796–1857)

- Born: 1796; Florence, Grand Duchy of Tuscany
- Died: 9 October 1857 (aged 60–61); Livorno, Grand Duchy of Tuscany (Note: Older reference works, including the Dictionary of Art Historians, state that François died in Florence. The archival study by Paolucci and Sarti (2023) gives Livorno, where he lived, kept his collection and held office as war and navy commissioner, as his place of death.)
- Known for: Discovery of the François Vase, the Tomb of the Monkey and the François Tomb
- Scientific career
- Fields: Archaeology

Alessandro François (1796 – 9 October 1857) was an Italian archaeologist and excavator, active in Etruria during the first half of the 19th century. A war commissioner in the service of the Grand Duchy of Tuscany, he devoted most of his time to archaeological research and is best known for three major discoveries: the François Vase and the Tomb of the Monkey at Chiusi, and the painted François Tomb at Vulci, all of which were named after him. The English traveller George Dennis described him as "the most experienced excavator in Tuscany".

== Biography ==
=== Early life and grand-ducal service ===
François was born in Florence in 1796. He married Virginia Bouvard, with whom he had four children. He served the Grand Duchy of Tuscany as deputy war commissioner (Pro-Commissario di Guerra) of the Royal Presidi at Orbetello, a district whose jurisdiction extended inland as far as Marsiliana and included much of Monte Argentario; he was later transferred to Florence and, in March 1849, appointed war and navy commissioner at Livorno.

François occupied a prominent place in the network of antiquarians and scholars of his day. In Florence he was in close contact with Francesco Inghirami and with the royal antiquarian Michele Arcangelo Migliarini, who proposed him to the direction of the grand-ducal galleries as a licensed excavator in Tuscany; in Rome he corresponded regularly with Eduard Gerhard and Emil Braun, secretaries of the Instituto di Corrispondenza Archeologica, and he frequented major collectors of the period, including Lucien Bonaparte and Giovanni Pietro Campana. He was invited to join the Accademia Etrusca of Cortona and the Instituto di Corrispondenza Archeologica.

=== Excavations in Etruria ===
François began exploring the ancient sites of Etruria in the early 1820s: in 1824 he identified the Etruscan settlement of Doganella in the Albegna valley, and from 1825 to 1828 he directed excavations below Cosa, near Orbetello. He later worked at Cortona (1843) and dug at Volterra, Fiesole, Roselle, Vetulonia, Populonia, Chiusi and Vulci.

At Chiusi, where he brought to light the painted Tomb of the Monkey in 1846 and went on exploring the surrounding territory as far as Chianciano until 1853, he entered into local excavation partnerships, among others with the baroness Giulia Spannocchi, with the Bonci Casuccini family and with Federigo Sozzi.

François had frequented the necropolises of Vulci since 1826, initially on behalf of Lucien Bonaparte, prince of Canino, on whose estates the Vulci cemeteries lay. He occasionally acted as an intermediary for the sale of material from the prince's excavations: in 1833 he tried, unsuccessfully, to arrange the sale of a large Bonaparte collection of vases and bronzes to the grand-ducal galleries, and in 1841 he promoted the sale of a lot of one hundred vases from the same collection. In the early 1840s he offered his services, without fee, as director of excavations to Bonaparte's widow, Alexandrine de Bleschamp, but the project did not materialise at that time.

=== The excavation company and the Vulci campaigns ===
The turning point came with the creation of an excavation company between François and the French scholar and epigrapher Adolphe Noël des Vergers, approved at the beginning of 1850 on an annually renewable basis; it opened an intense season of research that lasted seven years. When the partnership contract was renewed in December 1852, the wealthy Parisian publisher Ambroise Firmin Didot, des Vergers's father-in-law, joined the company, whose archaeological collection then numbered 306 objects, valued by Migliarini at 28,788 francs.

In 1853 François reached an agreement with Alexandrine Bonaparte and resumed the excavations at Vulci that the princes of Canino had abandoned. Work began on 11 April 1853, with weekly reports sent to the Apostolic Delegation as required by the Pacca edict of 1820; from 1 May, when François had to return to his post at Livorno, the direction of the dig passed to his son Enrico. A cholera epidemic prevented him from returning to the Papal States in 1854 and 1855, and Alexandrine Bonaparte herself died of the disease on 13 July 1855, ending François's excavation rights at Vulci. The new owner of the Canino estates, Prince Alessandro Torlonia, nevertheless allowed him to continue: he investigated the great tumulus of the Cuccumella between 14 April and 11 May 1856, with little success, and obtained a new three-year permit (1857–1859) for the Torlonia lands at Caere and Vulci.

François published accounts of his excavations in the Bullettino dell'Instituto di Corrispondenza Archeologica in 1849 and 1857. In the 1857 report, he also described his working method, which included recording the location of the tombs, keeping the finds from each context separate, and sieving the excavated earth through wire screens so that even the smallest fragments were recovered. Paola Pelagatti observed that his reports are often over-emphatic and that some of his ideas were unfortunate, such as the search for the "tomb of the Lucumo" described by Pliny in the tunnels under the rock of Chiusi, but credited him with unusual care, for his time, in documenting findspots and keeping assemblages distinct.

== Discoveries ==
=== The François Vase ===
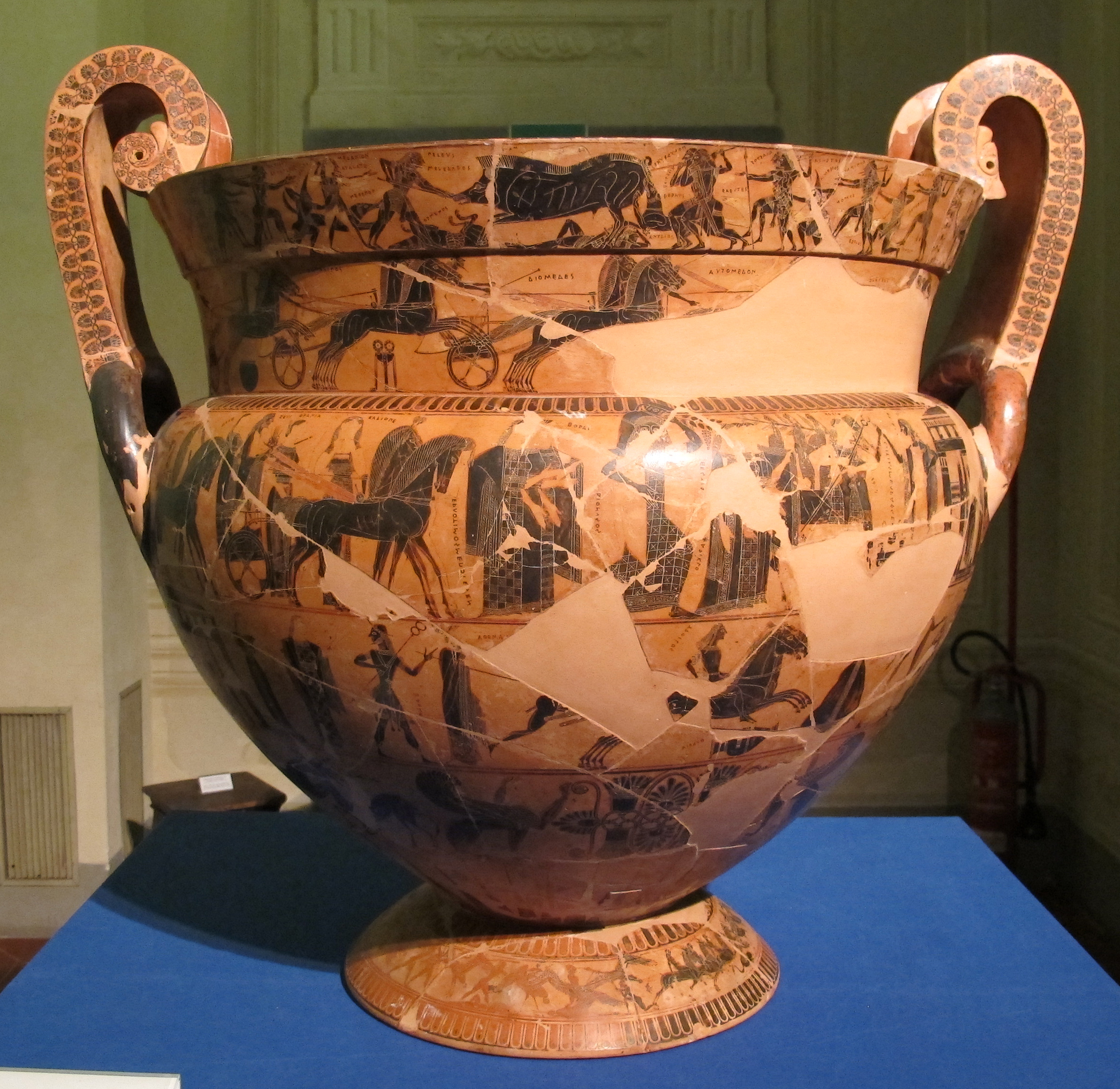
The François Vase

In 1844, at Fonte Rotella near Chiusi, François discovered numerous fragments, amounting to roughly two-thirds of a large Attic volute krater in the black-figure technique. Encouraged by Migliarini, who recognised the importance of the find, he returned to the site in 1845 and recovered five more large pieces. The vessel, restored by Giovan Gualberto Franceschi, was purchased by Leopold II, Grand Duke of Tuscany, for 500 zecchini and deposited in the Uffizi; it was first published by Emil Braun, and a further fragment was later donated to the museum by Carlo Strozzi.

The krater, 66 cm high and dated to about 570 BCE, bears the signatures of the potter Ergotimos and the painter Kleitias, and carries several superimposed friezes of Greek mythological scenes, notably from the Trojan War cycle. It was recognised from the moment of its discovery as a major monument of Greek ceramics. In 1900, the vase was smashed into 638 pieces by a museum guard, was restored by Pietro Zei, and underwent a final restoration in 1973 by Renzo Giachetti under the direction of Mauro Cristofani; it is now displayed in the Florence National Archaeological Museum.

=== The François Tomb ===
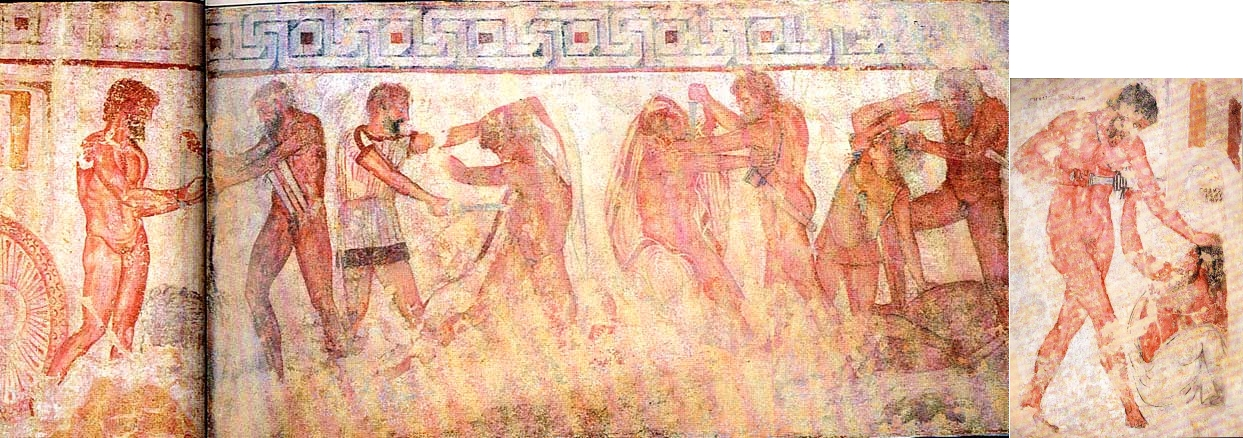
Fresco in the François Tomb: Liberation of Caile Vipinas, from left to right: Caile Vipinas, Macstrna, Larth Ultes, Laris Papathnas Velznach, Pesna Aremsnas Sveamach, Rasce, Venthikau and Avle Vipinas; right: Marce Camitlnas and Cnaeve Tarchunies Rumach

On 16 March 1857 François opened a new campaign in the Ponte Rotto necropolis of Vulci with fourteen workmen and a foreman. By the end of the month more than forty tombs had been located, and a week later their number had risen to about sixty; their opening began on 7 April. On 19 April he reported to des Vergers the discovery of an inscribed cippus placed at the entrance of a large family hypogeum, and in a letter of 1 May 1857 he announced that he had entered the tomb: a monument of five chambers near the river Fiora, the first of them painted with figures, many accompanied by Etruscan inscriptions. To protect the paintings he had a wall built across the entrance, which was later taken down to allow the painter Nicola Ortis, commissioned by des Vergers and Wilhelm Henzen, to copy the frescoes in the second half of May 1857.

The tomb, a multi-chambered hypogeum of the aristocratic Saties family dated to the second half of the 4th century BCE, is decorated with a celebrated pictorial cycle in which Greek myth and Etruscan history answer one another: the sacrifice of the Trojan prisoners by Achilles before the shade of Patroclus appears alongside a battle scene in which Macstrna, identified by the emperor Claudius with the Roman king Servius Tullius, frees Caile Vipinas, and the tomb's owner Vel Saties is portrayed with the boy Arnza. The use of mythological and historical scenes as a means of self-representation by an Etruscan aristocratic family has been the subject of specific study.

In 1862–1863, the frescoes were detached from the walls by order of the landowner, Prince Alessandro Torlonia, divided into panels and transferred to Rome, where they were displayed at the Collegio Romano and later in the Torlonia museum on the Via della Lungara, before eventually reaching the Villa Albani. After a restoration, they were exhibited in Hamburg and at Vulci in 2004. On 29 May 2026 the Italian state purchased the fresco cycle from the heirs of the Torlonia, Sforza Cesarini and Gaetani families for 15 million euros, and since 1 July 2026 it has been on permanent display at the National Etruscan Museum of Villa Giulia in Rome.

== Museum project and death ==
François kept the finds from his excavations, from March 1856, united with the share ceded by the Bonaparte heirs, at his home in Livorno, intending them to form the nucleus of an Etruscan museum. His repeated attempts to establish such a museum in Florence failed, as did an appeal to the French government. In September 1856 he wrote to Migliarini of his intention to retire from grand-ducal service and devote himself entirely to archaeology, hoping to lay the foundations of a national museum of antiquities before his death.

The discovery of the painted tomb at Vulci brought François wide acclaim, and he was already planning a new excavation campaign for the autumn when he died suddenly on 9 October 1857. After his death, some fifteen vases and bronzes from his excavations passed into the collection of des Vergers, who published the results of their common researches in L'Étrurie et les Étrusques (1862–1864).

== Bibliography ==
- Conestabile, Giancarlo (1858). "Di Alessandro François e dei suoi scavi nelle regioni dell'antica Etruria". Archivio Storico Italiano. n.s. (in Italian). VIII: 53–90.
- Minto, Antonio (1960). Il vaso François (in Italian). Florence: Leo S. Olschki.
- Buranelli, Francesco, ed. (1987). La tomba François di Vulci (Exhibition catalogue) (in Italian). Rome.
- Bonfante, Larissa, ed. (1986). Etruscan Life and Afterlife: A Handbook of Etruscan Studies. Detroit: Wayne State University Press. ISBN 978-0-8143-1813-3.
- de Grummond, Nancy Thomson, ed. (1996). "François, Alessandro". An Encyclopedia of the History of Classical Archaeology. Vol. 1. London: Routledge. pp. 461–462. ISBN 1-884964-78-8.
- Paolucci, Giulio (2014). Archeologia romantica in Etruria. Gli scavi di Alessandro François e Adolphe Noël des Vergers (in Italian). Rome: Quasar.
- Bruni, Stefano (2023). "Alessandro François, i fratelli Candelori e la scoperta dell'anfora di Exechias donata a Gregorio XVI". Mélanges de l'École française de Rome: Antiquité (in Italian). 135 (1): 43–65.
- Cristofani, Mauro (2000). Etruschi, una nuova immagine (in Italian). ISBN 9788809017924.
- Sordi, Marta (2001). Il pensiero sulla guerra nel mondo antico (in Italian). ISBN 9788834306895.
- Naso, Alessandro (2005). La pittura etrusca: guida breve (in Italian). L'Erma di Bretschneider. ISBN 978-8882653231.
