= Rider Amphora =

Ancient Greek artifact

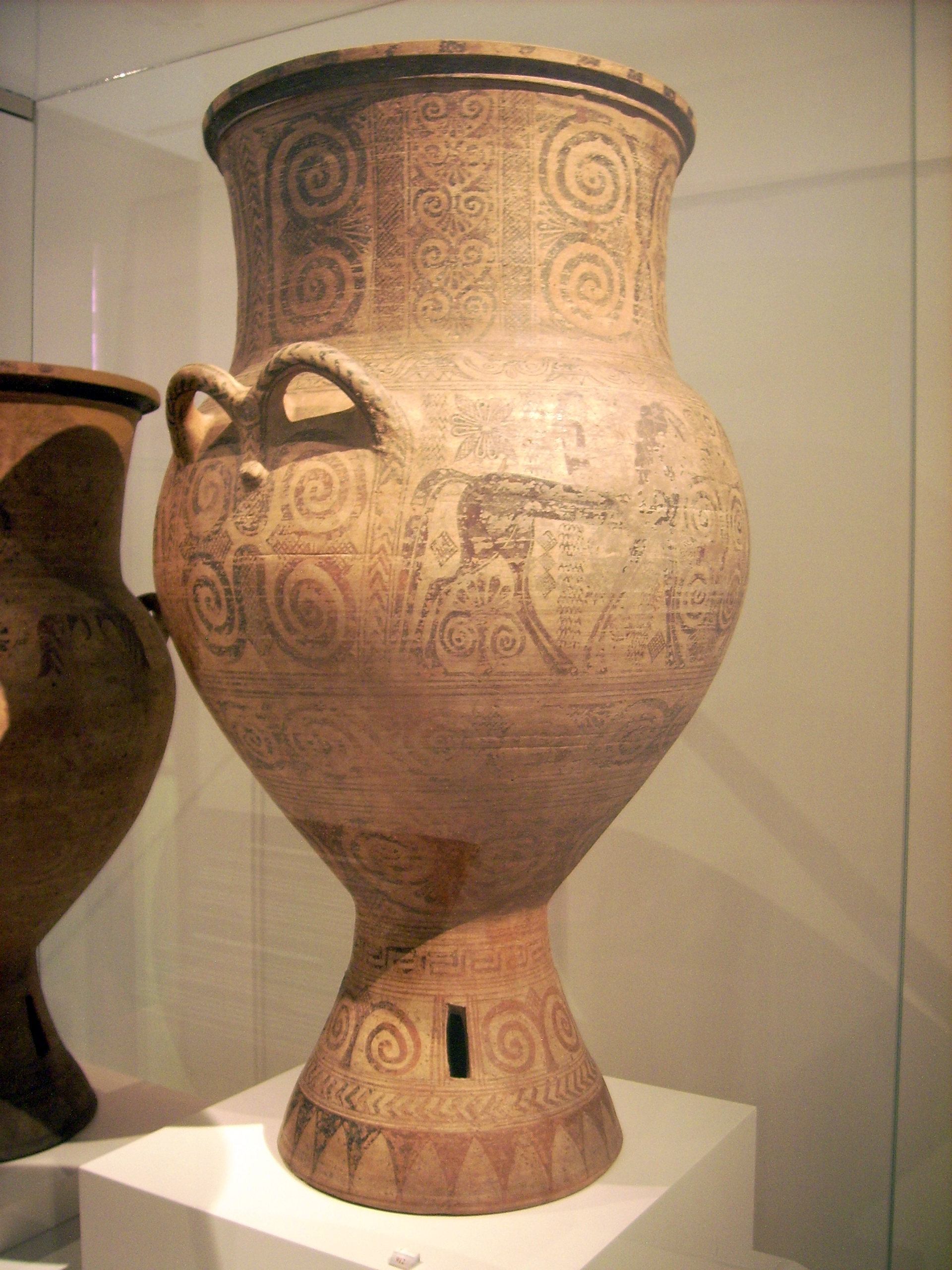
Rider Amphora in Athens

The Rider Amphora is the name given to a Melian pithamphora in the National Archaeological Museum, Athens with the inventory number 912. It dates from around 660 BC.

== Description ==
The Rider Amphora is 90 centimetres (35 in) high and has a comparatively wide shape for this kind of vessel. The name of the Rider Amphora derives from its main image of horses and riders. The empty space around this image is filled with various designs inherited from earlier Cycladic art, including zigzag bands and diamonds. The neck of the amphora is decorated with bulging double palmette volutes, which are separated from one another by vertical bands. On the backside, the painter depicts two riderless horses facing each other. There are no images on the other two sides.

=== Primary image ===
The primary image recalls that on the somewhat older Horses Amphora, on which two horses stand opposite each other, with a large palmette between them. The Rider Amphora's image differs in that a rider sits on each of the horses' backs. Each rider leads another horse with him, using a rope, which is depicted slightly offset behind the rider's horse. Commentator Werner Ekschmitt claims that the painter of this amphora does not demonstrate the same degree of talent as the painter of the Horses Amphora. The bodies of his horses are far too long and as a result the rider appears unnaturally small. Convention apparently forced the painter to adapt his motif to a restricted space.

== Bibliography ==
- Werner Ekschmitt: Kunst und Kultur der Kykladen, Teil II: Geometrische und Archaische Zeit, Mainz am Rhein 1986 (Kulturgeschichte der Antike, Vol. 28.2), pp. 138-139, Tab. 40 ISBN 3805309007
