= Melian pithamphora =

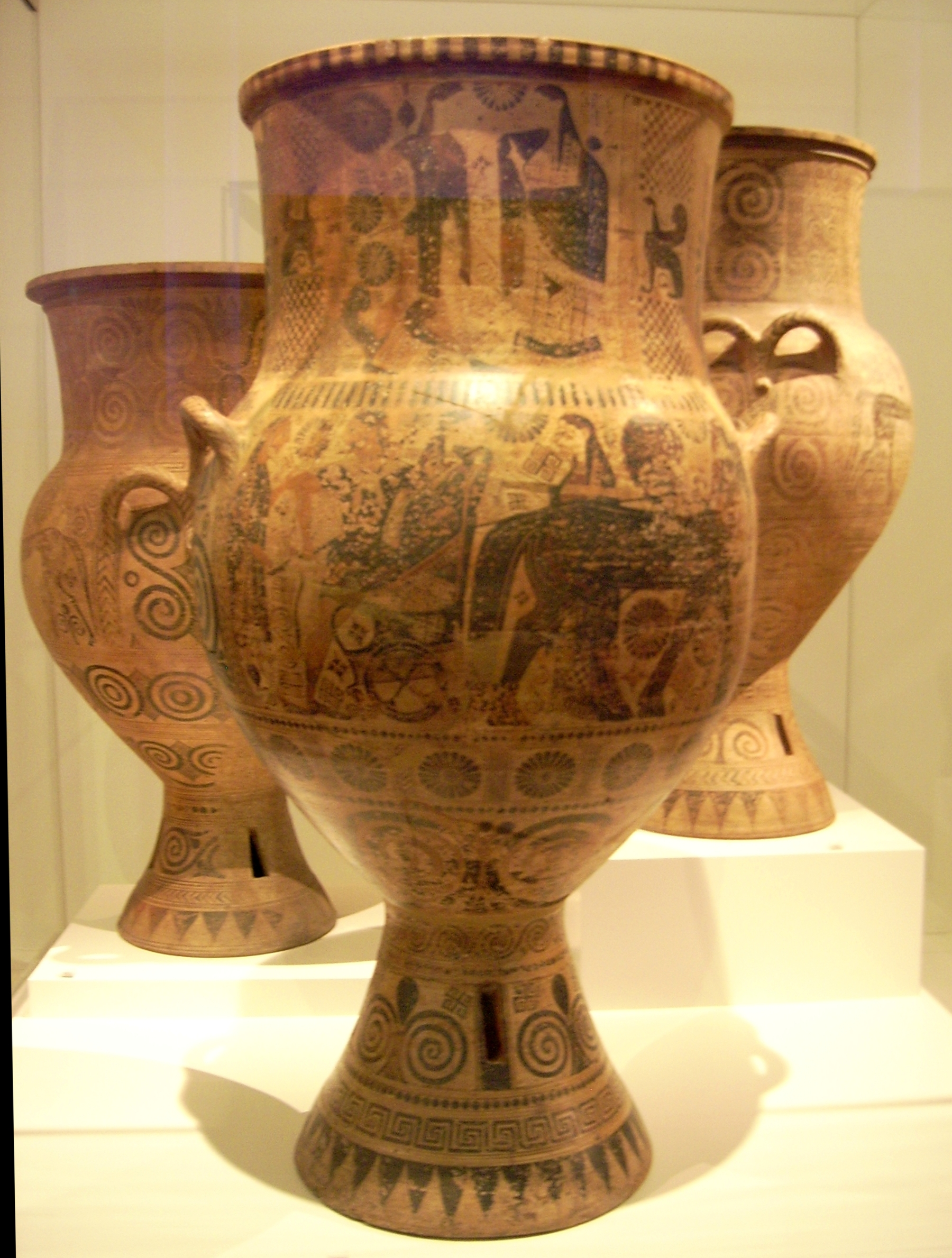
Left: Horses Amphora, Centre:Herakles Amphora, right: Rider Amphora in their current installation in the National Archaeological Museum, Athens.

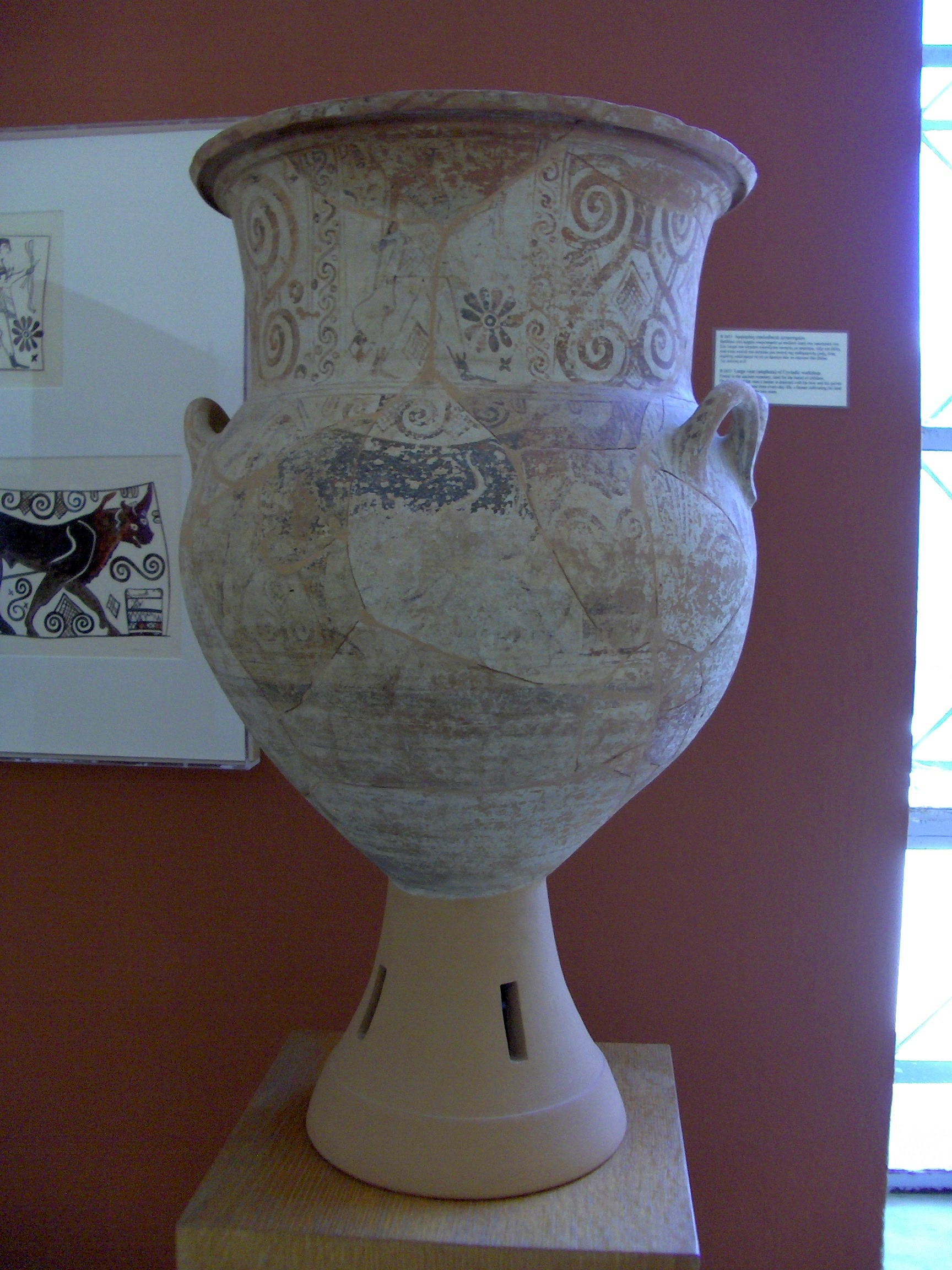
Amphora with depiction of a river scene in the Museum of Paros.

Melian Pithamphorae or Melian Amphorae are names for a type of large belly-handled amphorae, which were produced in the Archaic period in the Cyclades. On account of their shape and painted decoration in the Orientalising style, they are among the most famous Greek vases. The amphorae are dated to the seventh and early sixth centuries BC; the last of them was made in the 580s. They were used as grave markers with the same function as the later grave statues and reliefs and were dedicated as cult objects in sanctuaries. With the increasing importance of sculpture in these roles, the production of these vases came to an end.

== Provenance ==
Their name is misleading: the adjective "Melian" is often put in quotation marks. After Alexander Conze found the first three examples of this type on the Cycladian island of Melos in 1862, he named them Melische Thongefäße (Melian clay pots) after their find spot. The name has been retained, although it has meanwhile been shown that production did not occur on Melos. A majority of researchers (such as Ingeborg Scheibler place their production on Paros, others on Naxos, others still (such as Thomas Mannack) think it possible that there were two varieties. Dimitrios Papastamos and for a long time John Boardman, while not denying a Parian origin, supported the view that some had a Melian origin. The long-time excavator of Paros, Otto Rubensohn, denied that there were any useful clay deposits on the island. Many scholars believe that it is not possible to come to a conclusion from the current evidence.

To this day only a comparative few of these vases are known: eleven in total, nine complete and two fragmentary. Despite the small number of examples, their geographical range is wider than that of other Cycladian pottery. Their export stretches beyond the Cyclades to the Parian colony of Thasos, where imitations of the type have been found, and even to North Africa. In Delos some fragments have been found of vases which were probably destroyed before the cleansing of the island in 426 BC.

== Shape and decoration ==
The amphorae are up to 107 centimetres high and come in two forms: one older and somewhat stouter and another later and somewhat slenderer. The construction was clearly divided into three parts: the body, the neck which in the standard form of the amphora is almost as wide as the neck, and the high conical foot. The foot has holes to let out steam during the firing process at regular intervals.

The pots stand within the tradition of the older Cycladian pottery, such as the early Cycladian taper necked vessels (Kandiles) and the Geometric-Theran amphorae of the linear island style. Unlike these early forms, the pithamphorae seem to be organic in construction. The belly-handles on the sides are arranged as horizontal double handles. They can also contribute an additional optical effect through their decoration. On one type they can convey the impression of goats' horns, so that the amphora looks like a goat's head with broad horns. On a second variety eyes are drawn under the handles so that they look like eyebrows.

All the amphorae have a central image on the body, depicting animals, gods, heroes, and monsters. Often there is also figural decoration on the neck, less often on the foot. With a few exceptions, the neck is entirely or mostly decorated with metopes, which take up the whole height of the neck. The main image occupies roughly the upper half of the body with the lower half of the body usually filled with two bands of spiral or volute patterns. Between the vents, the foot is mostly decorated with double volutes, bordered above and below by geometric bands. An aureola follows as a conclusion. The figural images are usually quite graceful and elegant; the painters used opaque watercolours in very great quantities. Late examples depict figures in the Black figure style and others imitate the late animal frieze style.

== Catalogue of the Melian Amphorae ==
(Nicknames per Dimitrios Papastamos)

Nickname	Image	Location
Herakles Amphora		Athens, National Museum Inv. 354
Apollo Amphora		Athens, National Museum Inv. 911
Rider Amphora		Athens, National Museum Inv. 912
Horses Amphora		Athens, National Museum Inv. 913
Sphinx Amphora		Athens, National Museum Inv. 914
Dionysos Amphora		Athens, British School
Gerhard's Fragment		Berlin, Antikensammlung Inv. F 301
Conze's Fragment		Bonn, Akademisches Kunstmuseum Inv. 2040
Neapolis amphora		Kavala, Archaeological Museum
Amphora with depiction of the Judgment of Paris		Paros, Museum Inv. B 2652
Amphora with depiction of a river scene		Paros, Museum Inv. B 2653

== Bibliography ==
- Dimitrios Papastamos. Melische Amphoren (= Orbis Antiquus 25, ISSN 0078-5555). Aschendorff, Münster 1970 (Münster, Univ., Diss., 1968).
- Werner Ekschmitt. Kunst und Kultur der Kykladen. Volume 2: Geometrische und Archaische Zeit. von Zabern, Mainz 1986, ISBN 3-8053-0900-7, pp. 136–145, plates 40–43
- Ingeborg Scheibler. Griechische Töpferkunst. Herstellung, Handel und Gebrauch der antiken Tongefäße. C. H. Beck, München 1995, ISBN 3-406-39307-1, p. 165.
- John Boardman. Early Greek Vase Painting. 11th – 6th Century BC. A Handbook. Thames and Hudson, London 1998, ISBN 0-500-20309-1, pp. 111–112.
- Photeini Zapheiropoulou. Paros. Archaeological Receipts Fund, Athens 1998, ISBN 960-214-902-7, pp. 38–39.
- Thomas Mannack. Griechische Vasenmalerei. Eine Einführung. Theiss, Stuttgart 2002, ISBN 3-8062-1743-2, pp. 89–90.
