= Gordion cup =

Ancient Greek pottery

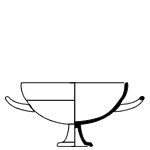
Gordion cup

Gordion cups are the earliest form of Attic Little-Master cups. The shape probably flourished around 560 BC. They do not only comprise the earliest, but also the smallest examples of Little-Master cups. The cup lip is covered in black slip and clearly distinguished from the rest of the vessel. The handle zone is decorated with a black stripe near its upper edge, and often a second one near the lower edge. The foot is similar to that of a Siana cup, but more elongated and painted with decorative stripes on the bottom. Also similar to Siana cups, the interior is painted with a circular figural image, framed by a tongue pattern. The similarity to Siana cups is hardly coincidental, as they were the direct predecessors of Little-Master cups.

The Gordion cup type is named after a specimen found in the ancient city of Gordion, made by Ergotimos and painted by Kleitias. As usual on this shape, their signatures are placed straight between the fine handle palmettes.

The best-known painters of this type are Sondros, Phrynos, Sokles and Archikles.

== Bibliography ==
- John Boardman: Schwarzfigurige Vasen aus Athen. Ein Handbuch, Mainz 1977, ISBN 3-8053-0233-9, p. 65
