= Painter of Acropolis 606 =

Ancient Greek black-figure vase painter

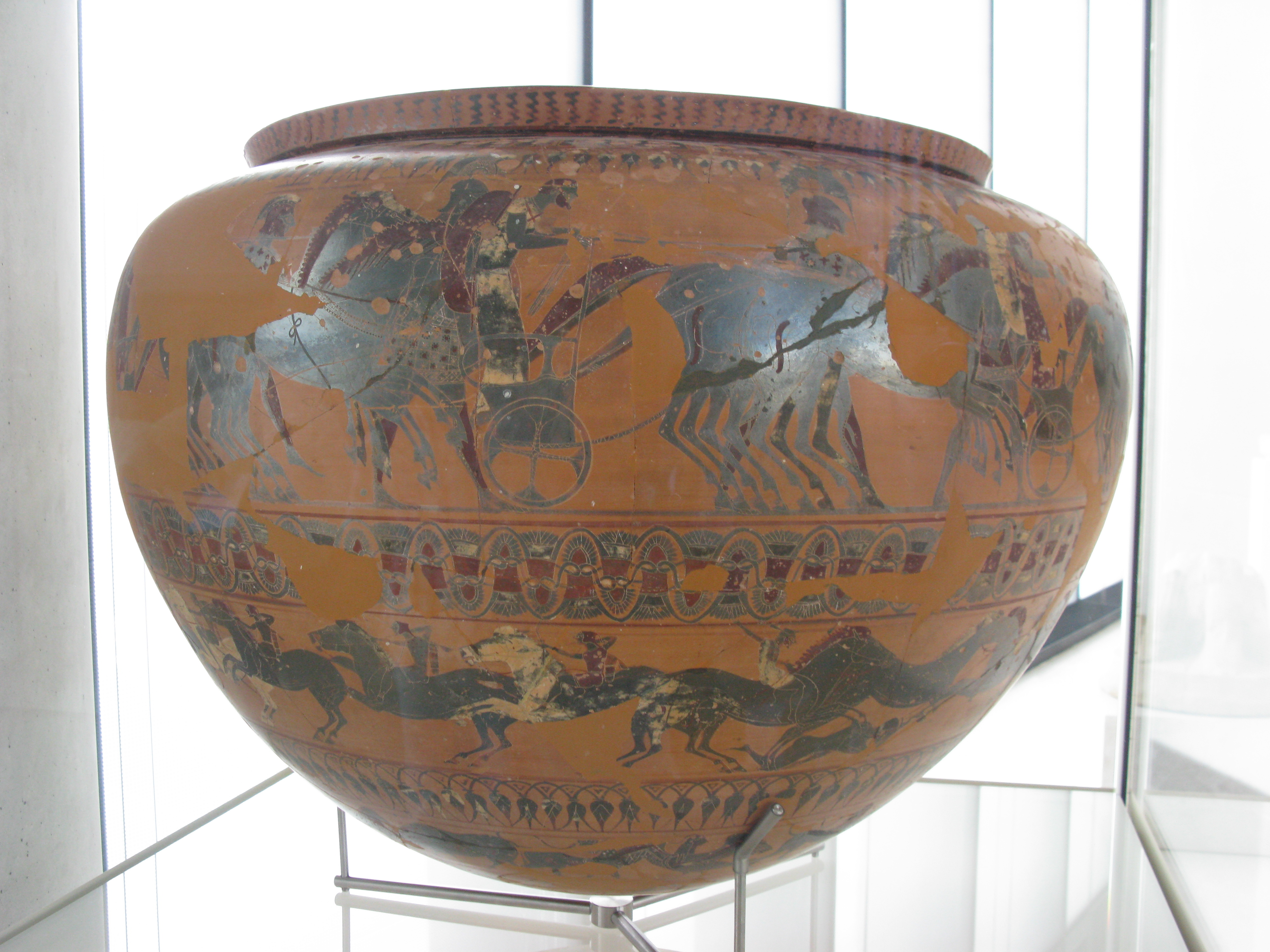
The Painter of Acropolis 606's name vase, a dinos, discovered at the Athenian Acropolis

The Painter of Acropolis 606 (sometimes Painter of Athens 606) was a black-figure vase painter, active around 570–560 BC.

His name vase is a dinos discovered on the Athenian Acropolis and now on display in the National Museum at Athens (inventory acr. 606). The vase is representative of the "new seriousness" which was then emerging in Attic painting. On its main frieze, it depicts a battle between warriors and chariots. R.M. Cook says:

There is in these figures a severity and even grimness that comes partly from the solid forms, partly from their workmanlike action; the detail too is plainer. Spruce elegance has given way to a robuster appreciation of anatomy, and the strong full features make the figures look larger than life ... this is a sombre masterpiece.

The subsidiary friezes are of animals, plants and horsemen. On the lower part, there is an eddy of animal figures, resembling the work of Kleitias. His sensitivity for colour and details also resembles that artist. He took a careful interest in the posture of his figures, and expended much effort on such details as armour or helmets. He painted many so-called "Rider amphorae", with a more pronounced belly than normal amphorae and a decorative scheme comparable to that of Horsehead Amphorae.

== Bibliography ==
- Cook, Robert Manuel (1997). Greek Painted Pottery. Psychology Press. pp. 80–. ISBN 978-0-415-13859-8.
- Beazley, John: Attic Black-figure Vase-painters. Oxford 1956, p. 81.
- Boardman, John: Schwarzfigurige Vasen aus Athen. Ein Handbuch, von Zabern, 4. edn, Mainz 1994 (Kulturgeschichte der Antiken Welt, Vol 1) ISBN 3-8053-0233-9, p. 39
