= Horses Amphora =

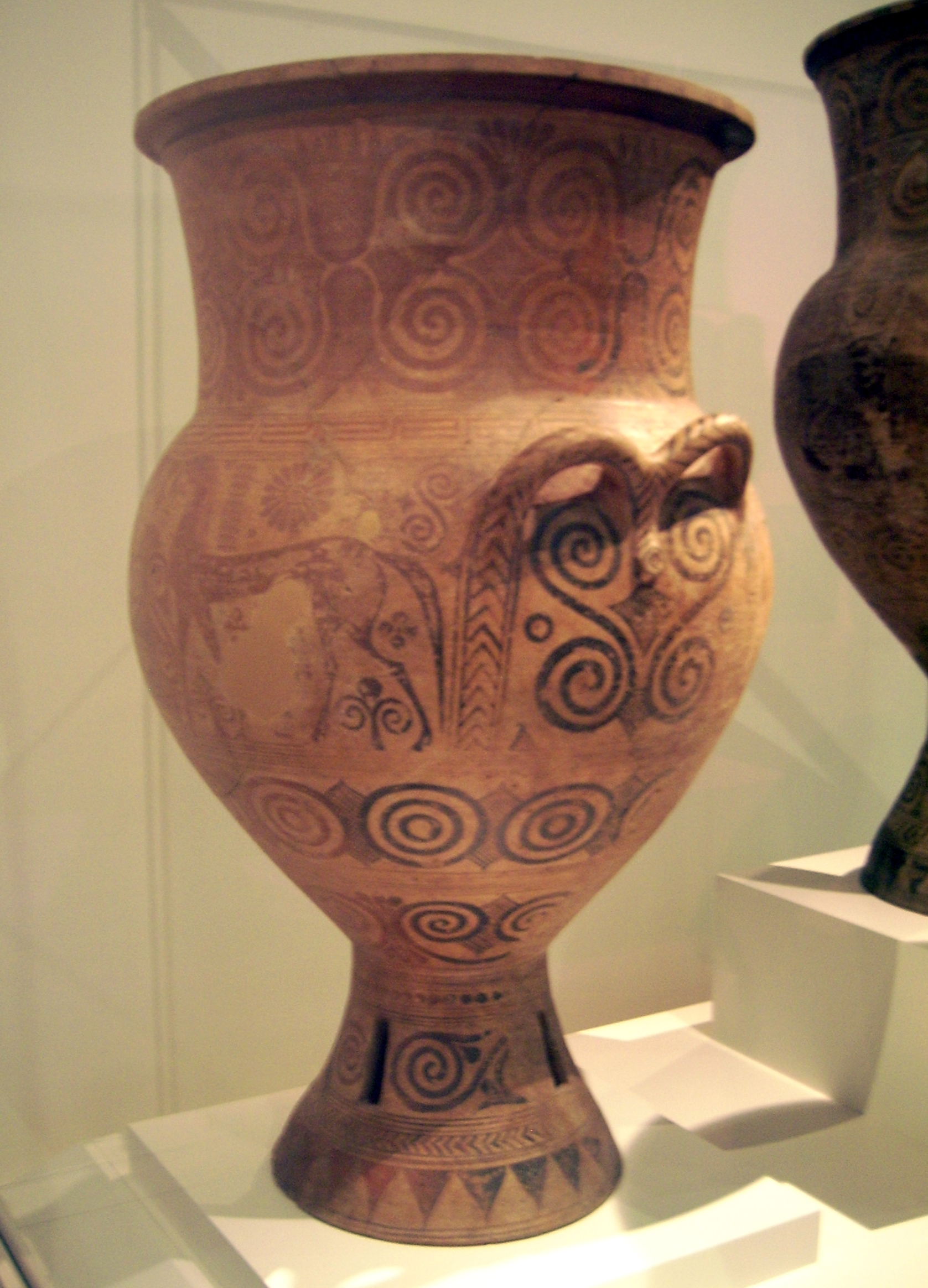
The Horse Amphora in Athens

The Horse Amphora is the name given to a Melian pithamphora in the National Archaeological Museum, Athens with the inventory number 913. It is dated to around 660 BC.

The Horse Amphora is the oldest known Melian Amphora and is among the largest examples of the type. The amphora is 88 centimetres high, the lid is not preserved.

The name of the vessel derives from its main image, which shows two slim, graceful, long-legged horses standing beside each other. The two are separated by a palmette. While their bodies are shown as silhouettes, the heads are depicted in outline. The empty space was filled with various motifs, including zigzags which recall earlier images of Group Ad, though the drawings are far more detailed than those of the Ad Group. Along with the zigzags, there are also double-volutes and leaf-rosettes. Out-turned double-volutes are found on the neck which are filled with cross-hatching. The two ornamental bands of the vessel's body are decorated with simpler double-volutes and concentric circles. The horizontal double handles are reminiscent of goats' horns (or, really, anything curved...). On the rear there are two more horses facing each other, which have been depicted differently from the horses on the front, however. Both sides were decorated therefore, but the rear has mostly flaked off.

The horse motif fits with its use as a grave vase, since the horse had sepulchral symbolism.

== See also ==
- Horsehead Amphora

== Bibliography ==
- Werner Ekschmitt: Kunst und Kultur der Kykladen, Teil II: Geometrische und Archaische Zeit, Mainz am Rhein 1986 (Kulturgeschichte der Antike, Band 28,2), S. 137-138, Taf. 42 ISBN 3805309007
