= Ingeborg Scheibler =

German classical archaeologist

Ingeborg Scheibler (born 31 August 1929 in Krefeld) is a German classical archaeologist.

Ingeborg Scheibler obtained her doctorate at the University of Tübingen on 17 April 1956 by Bernhard Schweitzer for her thesis Studien zur Komposition der frühgriechischen Flächenkunst. Die symmetrische Bildform und ihre Geschichte (Studies on the Composition of Early Greek Two-Dimensional Art: Symmetrical motifs and their history). For 1956 until 1957, she received the Reisestipendium des Deutschen Archäologischen Instituts. Subsequently, she was active in the Kerameikos excavation. She achieved her habilitation in 1971 at LMU Munich with her work Griechische Lampen (aus dem Kerameikos) (Greek Lamps of the Kerameikos). In Munich, she was head conservator at the Museum für Abgüsse Klassischer Bildwerke and taught as a professor extraordinary.

Schiebler deals in particular with Greek pottery and painting, as well as art history. Her monograph, Griechische Töpferkunst (Greek Ceramic Art) is a standard reference work and has also been translated into Italian. As a noted expert on the production of Greek pottery and its economic, technical, and stylistic background, Scheibler was also responsible for a great part of the articles on these themes in Der Neue Pauly and the Lexikon der Alten Welt. She is a corresponding member of the German Archaeological Institute.

== Publications ==
- Die symmetrische Bildform in der frühgriechischen Flächenkunst (Symmetrical motifs in Early Greek Two-Dimensional Art), Lassleben, Kallmünz 1960.
- Griechische Lampen (Greek Lamps), de Gruyter, Berlin 1976 (Kerameikos, Bd. 11) ISBN 3-11-004858-2
- Griechische Töpferkunst. Herstellung, Handel und Gebrauch der antiken Tongefässe (Greek Ceramic Art: Production, trade, and use of ancient pottery), C. H. Beck, Munich 1983 (Becks archäologische Bibliothek) ISBN 3-406-09544-5 (2nd Edition, 1995; Italian: Il vaso in Grecia, Longanesi, Mailand 2004 (Biblioteca di archeologia, Bd. 34) ISBN 88-304-1607-X)
- Griechische Malerei der Antike (Greek Painting in Antiquity), C. H. Beck, Munich 1994 ISBN 3-406-38492-7
