= Horsehead Amphora =

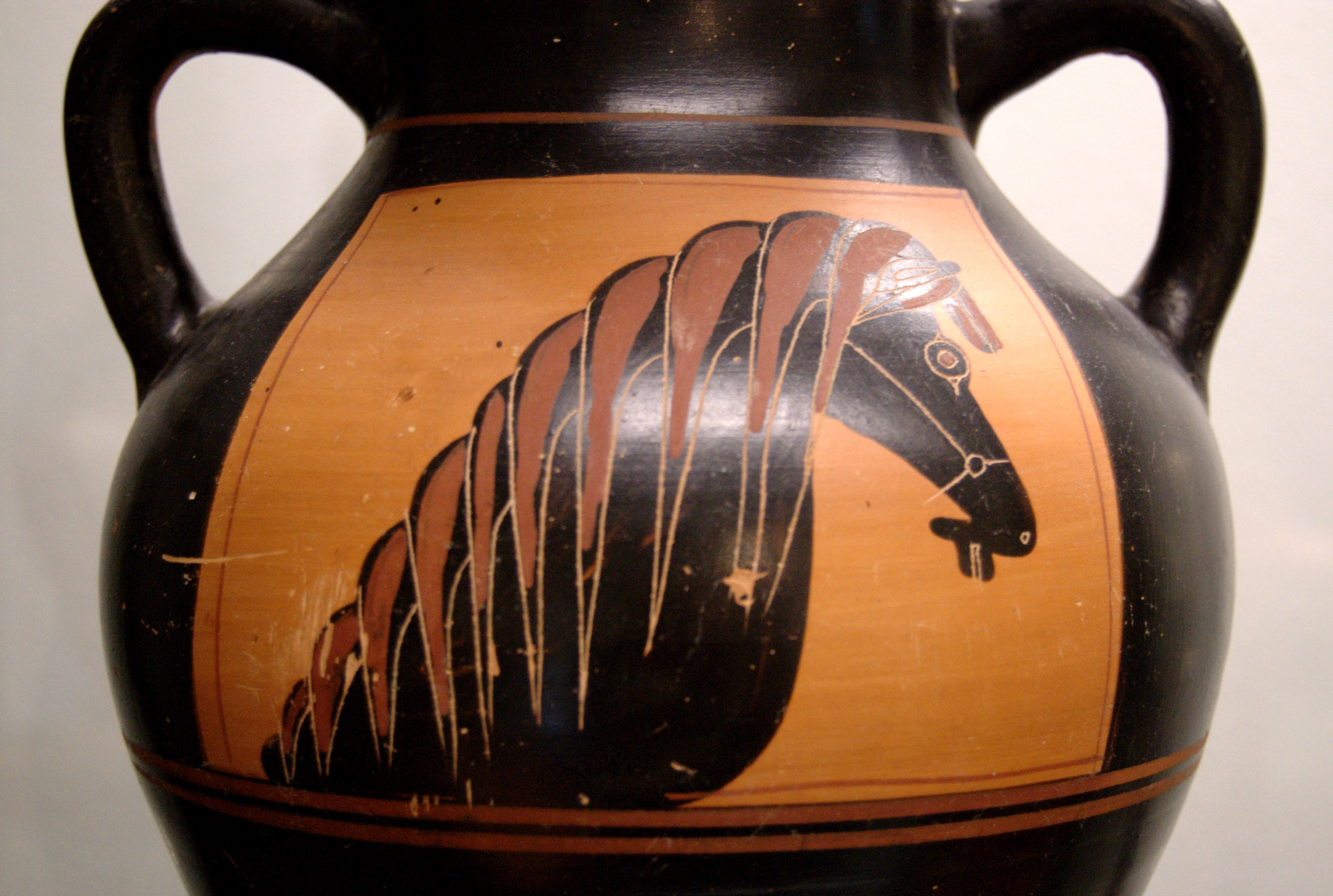
Horsehead amphora in the Staatlichen Antikensammlungen, Munich, circa 550BC.

The Horsehead Amphora is a specific type of amphora, produced in Athens from about 600 BC onwards. They are vessels with a very pronounced belly, decorated with black figure horseheads on both sides. In a single case, one side depicts a woman's head. In contrast to earlier belly amphorae, the painters did not apply a separate frieze on the neck. The decoration was painted within reserved rectangular panels; the remaining vase of the body was painted black. More than 100 such amphorae are known; they were painted by a variety of artists, including ones of mediocre quality.

The amphorae appear to have had a specific meaning or purpose, remains elusive to modern scholarship. Some scholars have suggested that they were grave vases, but not a single specimen was found in a grave context. Should that interpretation be correct, the horses may be connected with Hades, or be symbols of Poseidon in an unusual role as god of the underworld. A further possibility is that the vases served as victory prizes. Erika Simon proposed that they were typical votive dedications using by the Athenian nobility, who also provided the state's cavalry. In that case, the horsehead would be a symbol of social standing. According to John D. Beazley, the vases were part of the Athenian vase painters' repertoire for less than half a century. No stylistic development can be detected. It is possible that they were precursors to the Panathenaic prize amphorae. The Painter of the Aachen horsehead is named for his habit of painting horsehead amphorae.

== See also ==
- Horses Amphora

== Bibliography ==
- John Beazley: Attic Black-figure Vase-painters. Oxford 1956, p. 15–17.
- M. G. Picozzi, Anfore attiche a protome equina. Studi Miscellanei 18 (1970–71)
- Ann Birchall: Attic Horse Head Amphorae, In: Journal of Hellenic Studies 92, 1972, p. 46f.
- John Boardman: Schwarzfigurige Vasen aus Athen. Ein Handbuch, von Zabern, 4. edn, Mainz 1994 (Kulturgeschichte der Antiken Welt, Vol 1) ISBN 3-8053-0233-9, p. 18.
- Bettina Kreuzer: Untersuchungen zu den attischen Pferdekopfamphoren, In: Bulletin antieke beschaving. Vol 73, 1998, p. 95–114.
- Reinhard Lullies in Antike Kunstwerke aus der Sammlung Ludwig. Band 1. Frühe Tonsarkophage und Vasen, von Zabern, Mainz 1979, p. 45–46, ISBN 3-8053-0439-0.
