= Ergotimos =

Greek potter

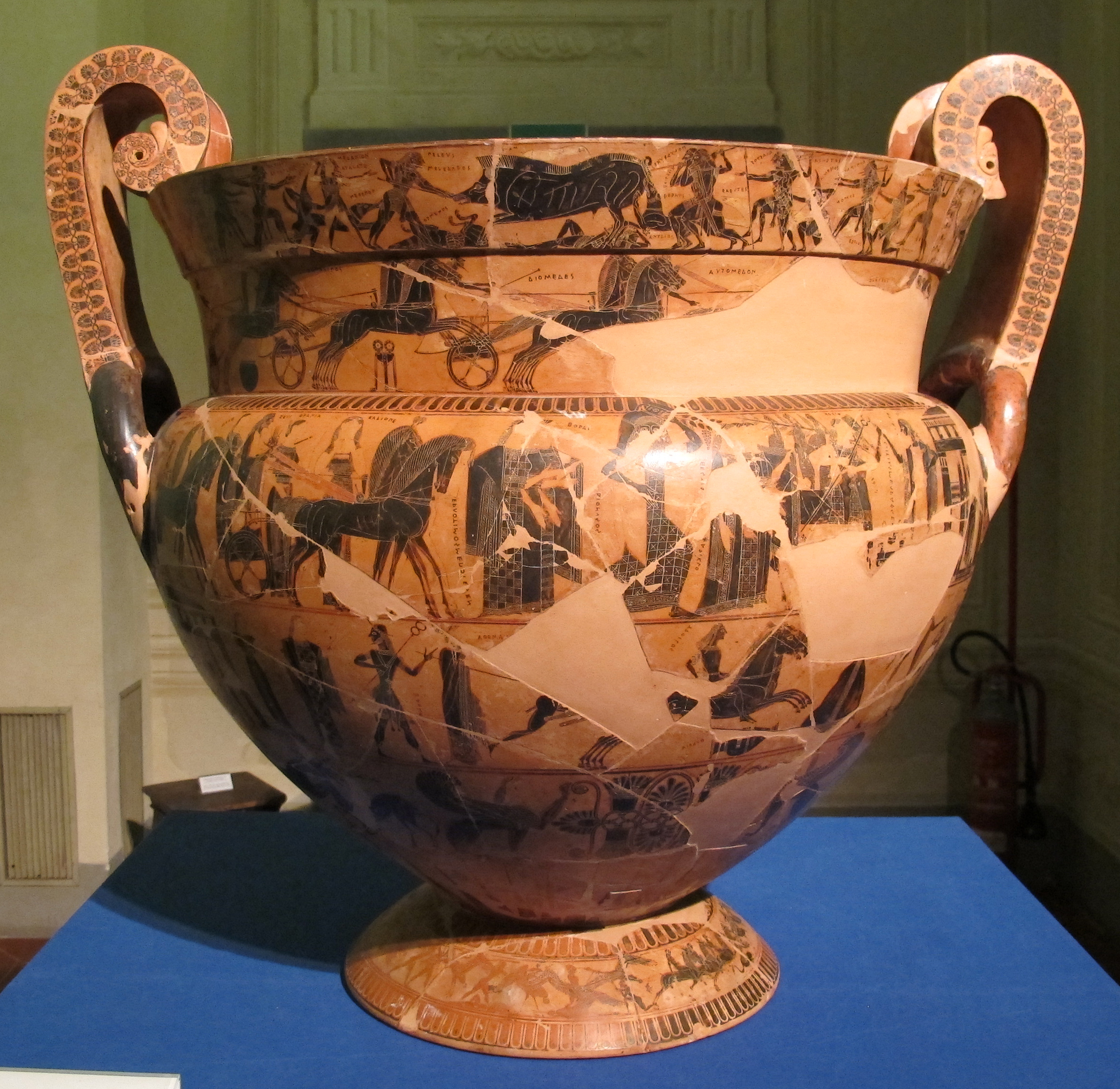
The François Vase

Ergotimos (Έργότιμος) was a Greek potter, active in Athens, circa 570–560 BC. His son Eucharios was also a potter, as was a grandson whose name is not known. The following works signed by him are known:

- Berlin, Antikensammlung 3151: footless cup
- Berlin, Antikensammlung V. I. 4604: 'Gordion cup', from Gordion
- Delphi: Fragment of a skyphos or kantharos
- Florence, Museo Archeologico Etrusco 4209: volute krater, so-called 'François vase'
- London, British Museum and Cambridge, Fitzwilliam Museum: Fragments of two cups from Naukratis
- New York, Metropolitan Museum 31.11.4: Stand

Apart from the cup Berlin 3151, all are painted by the vase painter Klitias.

== See also ==
- Black-figure pottery
- Pottery of ancient Greece

== Bibliography ==
- John Beazley: Attic Black-Figure Vase-Painters, Oxford 1956, p. 76-80.
- Der neue Pauly IV, 1998, Col. 65 s.v. Ergotimos (Heide Mommsen)
- Künstlerlexikon der Antike I, München, Leipzig 2001, p. 214 s.v. Ergotimos (Bettina Kreuzer)
