= Kleitias =

Ancient Greek vase painter

Kleitias (Greek: Κλειτίας, sometimes rendered as Klitias) was an ancient Athenian vase painter of the black-figure style who flourished c. 570–560 BCE. Kleitias' most celebrated work today is the François Vase (c. 570 BCE), which bears over two hundred figures in its six friezes. Painted inscriptions on four pots and one ceramic stand name Kleitias as their painter and Ergotimos as their potter, showing the craftsmen's close collaboration. A variety of other fragments have been attributed to him on a stylistic basis.

== Signed works ==
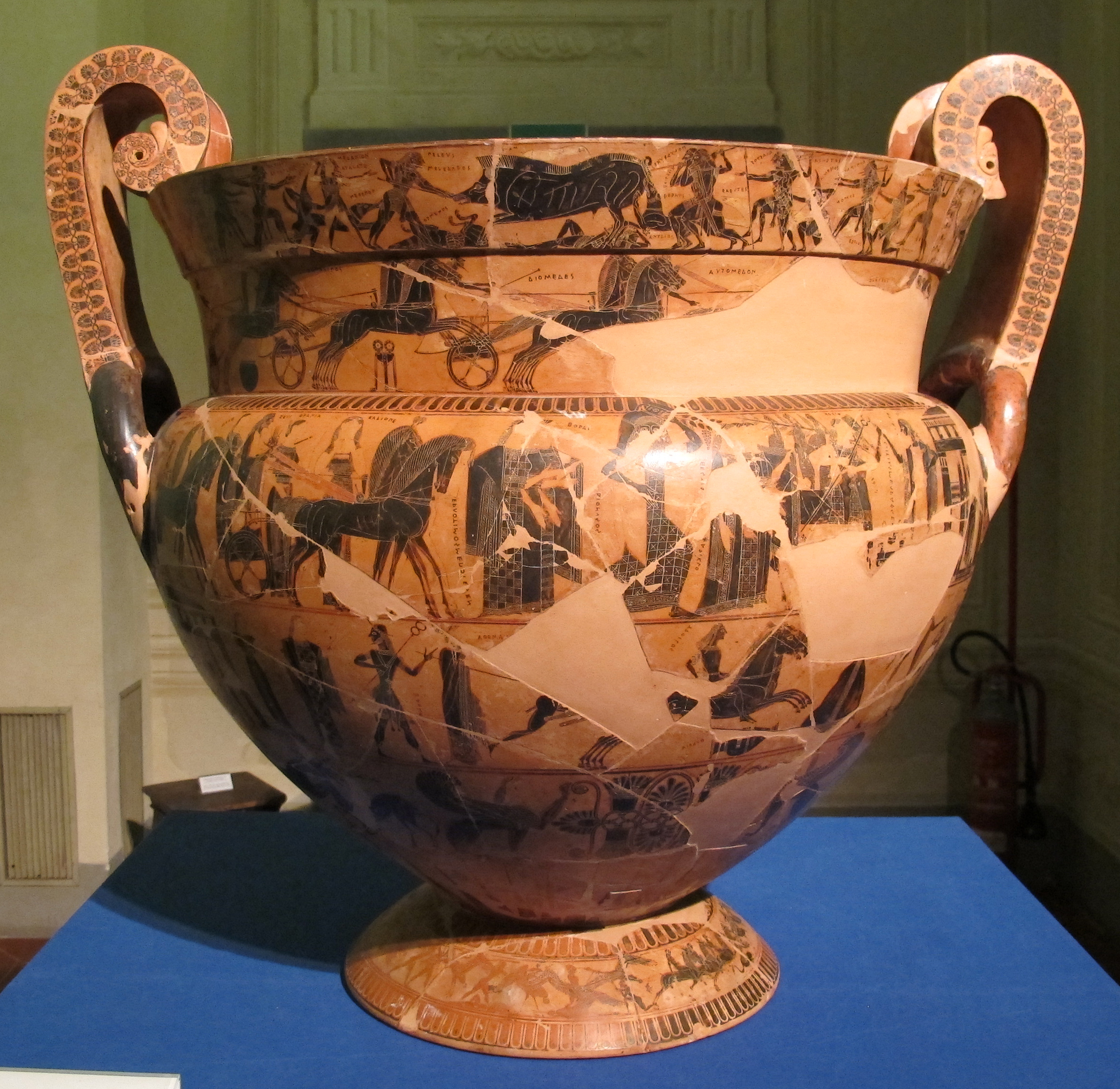
The "François Vase"

- Berlin, Antikensammlung V. I. 4604: Gordion cup from Gordion
- Florence, Museo Archeologico 4209 ("François Vase", also known as "Klitias krater"): volute krater
- London, British Museum 1948.8-15.1 u. 2; 88.6-1.215, 424, 427 + Cambridge N 206: fragments of a cup from Naukratis
- London, British Museum 88.6-1.237, 324, 426; 1948.8-15.3 u. 4: fragments of a cup from Naukratis
- New York, Metropolitan Museum 31.11.4: stand from Vari

== See also ==
- Painter of Acropolis 606
- Black-figure vase painting

== Bibliography ==
- John Beazley: Attic Black-Figure Vase-Painters, Oxford 1956, p. 76–78.
- Bettina Kreuzer: Klitias, in: Künstlerlexikon der Antike Vol 1, 2001, p. 419–420.
