= List of state leaders in the 6th century BC =

State leaders in the 7th century BC – State leaders in the 5th century BC – State leaders by year

This is a list of state leaders in the 6th century BC (600–501 BC).

== Africa: North ==
Carthage

- Carthage (complete list) –

Didonian
- Hanno I, King (c.580–c.556 BC)
- Malchus, King (c.556–c.550 BC)
Magonids
- Mago I, King (c.550–c.530 BC)
- Hasdrubal I, King (c.530–c.510 BC)
- Hamilcar I, King (c.510–480 BC)

Cyrene

- Cyrene (complete list) –

- Battus I, King (630–600 BC)
- Arcesilaus I, King (600–583 BC)
- Battus II, King (583–560 BC)
- Arcesilaus II, King (560–550 BC)
- Battus III, King (550–530 BC)
- Arcesilaus III, King (530–515 BC)
- Battus IV, King (515–465 BC)

Egypt: Late Period

- Twenty-sixth Dynasty of the Late Period (complete list) –

- Necho II, Pharaoh (610–595 BC)
- Psamtik II, Pharaoh (595–589 BC)
- Apries, Pharaoh (589–570 BC)
- Amasis II, Pharaoh (570–526 BC)
- Psamtik III, Pharaoh (526–525 BC)

Kush

- Kingdom of Kush (complete list) –

- Anlamani, King (620–600 BC)
- Aspelta, King (600–580 BC)
- Aramatle-qo, King (568–555 BC)
- Malonaqen, King (555–542 BC)
- Analmaye, King (542–538 BC)
- Amaninatakilebte, King (538–519 BC)
- Karkamani, King (519–510 BC)
- Amaniastabarqa, King (510–487 BC)

== Asia ==
=== Asia: East ===
China: Spring and Autumn period

- Zhou, China: Eastern Zhou (complete list) –

- Ding, King (606–586 BC)
- Jian, King (585–572 BC)
- Ling, King (571–545 BC)
- Jing, King (544–520 BC)
- Dao, King (520 BC)
- Jìng, King (519–477 BC)

- Cai (complete list) –

- Wen, Marquis (611–592 BC)
- Jing, Marquis (591–543 BC)
- Ling, Marquis (542–531 BC)
- Ping, Marquis (530–522 BC)
- Dao, Marquis (521–519 BC)
- Zhao, Marquis (518–491 BC)

- Cao (complete list) –

- Wen, Duke (617–595 BC)
- Xuan, Duke (594–578 BC)
- Cheng, Duke (577–555 BC)
- Wu, Duke (554–528 BC)
- Ping, Duke (527–524 BC)
- Dao, Duke (523–515 BC)
- Sheng, Duke (514–510 BC)
- Yin, Duke (509–506 BC)
- Jing, Duke (505–502 BC)
- Cao Bo yang, ruler (501–487 BC)

- Chen (complete list) –

- Xia Zhengshu, ruler (7th–6th century BC)
- Cheng, Duke (c.6th century BC)
- Ai, Duke (c.6th century BC)
- Liu, Prince (c.6th century BC)
- (Chuan Fengxu), ruler (c.6th century BC)
- Hui, Duke (6th–5th century BC)

- Chu (complete list) –

- Zhuang, King (613–591 BC)
- Gong, King (590–560 BC)
- Kang, King (559–545 BC)
- Jia'ao, ruler (544–541 BC)
- Ling, King (540–529 BC)
- Zi'ao, ruler (529 BC)
- Ping, King (528–516 BC)
- Zhao, King (515–489 BC)

- Jin (complete list) –

- Cheng, Duke (606–600 BC)
- Jing, Duke (599–581 BC)
- Li, Duke (580–573 BC)
- Dao, Duke (573–558 BC)
- Ping, Duke (557–532 BC)
- Zhao, Duke (531–526 BC)
- Qing, Duke (525–512 BC)
- Ding, Duke (511–475 BC)

- Lu (complete list) –

- Xuan, Duke (608–591 BC)
- Cheng, Duke (590–573 BC)
- Xiang, Duke (572–542 BC)
- Ziye, ruler (542 BC)
- Zhao, Duke (541–510 BC)
- Ding, Duke (509–495 BC)

- Qi: House of Jiang (complete list) –

- Hui, Duke (608–599 BC)
- Qing, Duke (598–582 BC)
- Ling, Duke (581–554 BC)
- Zhuang II, Duke (553–548 BC)
- Jing, Duke (547–490 BC)

- Qin (complete list) –

- Huan, Duke (603–577 BC)
- Jing, Duke (576–537 BC)
- Ai, Duke (536–501 BC)

- Song (complete list) –

- Wen, Duke (610–589 BC)
- Gong, Duke (588–576 BC)
- Ping, Duke (575–532 BC)
- Yuan, Duke (531–517 BC)
- Jing, Duke (516–451 BC)

- Wey (complete list) –

- Cheng, Duke (634–600 BC)
- Mu, Duke (599–589 BC)
- Ding, Duke (588–577 BC)
- Xian, Duke (576–559 BC)
- Shang, Duke (558–547 BC)
- Xian, Duke (546–544 BC)
- Xiang, Duke (543–535 BC)
- Ling, Duke (534–493 BC)

- Wu (complete list) –

- Shoumeng, ruler (585–561 BC)
- Zhufan, King (560–548 BC)
- Yuji, King (547–544 BC)
- Yumei, King (543–527 BC)
- Liao, King (526–515 BC)
- Helü, King (515–496 BC)

- Yue (complete list) –

- Wuren of Yue, Marquis (7th–6th century BC)
- Wushen of Yue, Marquis (6th century BC)
- Futan of Yue, Marquis (565─538 BC)
- Yunchang of Yue, King (?─497 BC)

- Zheng (complete list) –

- Xiang, Duke (604–587 BC)
- Dao, Duke (586–585 BC)
- Cheng, Duke (584–581 BC, 581–571 BC)
- Xu, Prince (581 BC)
- Xi, Duke (581 BC, 570–566 BC)
- Jian, Duke (565–530 BC)
- Ding, Duke (529–514 BC)
- Xian, Duke (513–501 BC)

=== Asia: Southeast ===
Vietnam

- Hồng Bàng dynasty (complete list) –

- Tân line, King (c.660–c.569 BC)
- Nhâm line, King (c.568–408 BC)

=== Asia: South ===
India

- Magadha: Haryanka dynasty (complete list) –

- Bimbisara (c.544–c.492 BC)

Sri Lanka

#	Name	Period	Era	House	Reign		Duration
#	Name	Period	Era	House	From	To	(years, months, days)
1	Vijaya	Pre Anuradhapura	Tambapanni (complete list)	Vijaya	543 BC	505 BC	38 Years
-	Upatissa	Pre Anuradhapura	Tambapanni (complete list)	Vijaya	505 BC	504 BC	1 Year
2	Panduvasdeva	Pre Anuradhapura	Tambapanni (complete list)	Vijaya	504 BC	474 BC	30 Years

=== Asia: West ===
- Neo-Babylonian Empire: Dynasty XI (complete list) –

- Nebuchadnezzar II, King (c.605–562 BC)
- Amel-Marduk, King (c.562–560 BC)
- Neriglissar, King (c.560–556 BC)
- Labashi-Marduk, King (c.556 BC)
- Nabonidus, King (c.556–539 BC)

- Elam: Humban-Tahrid dynasty (complete list) –

- Humban-kitin, King (late 7th/early 6th century BC)
- Hallutash-Inshushinak II, King (c.598/593–583/578 BC)
- Humban-Shuturuk, King (early 6th century BC)
- Ummanunu, King (early 6th century BC)
- Bahuri, King (early 6th century BC)
- Shilhak-Inshushinak II, King (early 6th century BC)
- Atta-hamiti-Inshushinak I, King (early 6th century BC)
- Halkatash, King (?–c.549/8 BC)
- Tepti-Humban-Inshushinak II, King (c.550–530 BC)
- Açina, King (?–522 BC)
- Ummanunu II or Humban-Nikash IV (Ummaniš), King (522–521 BC)
- Atta-hamiti-Inshushinak, King (?–520/19 BC)

- Kingdom of Judah (complete list) –

Chronologies as established by Albright
- Jehoiakim, King (609–598 BC)
- Jeconiah, King (598 BC)
- Zedekiah, King (597–587 BC)

- Lydia (complete list) –

- Sadyattes, King (629–617 BC or c.625–c.600 BC)
- Alyattes, King (617–560 BC or c.600–560 BC)
- Croesus, King (560–546 BC or 560–547 BC)

- Median Empire (complete list) –

- Cyaxares, King (625–585 BC)
- Astyages, King (585–550 BC)

- Anshan (complete list) –

- Cyrus I, King (640–580 BC)
- Cambyses I, King (580–559 BC)
- Cyrus the Great, II

- King of Anshan (559–530 BC)
- King of Persia (?–530 BC)

- First Persian Empire: Achaemenid Empire(complete list) –

- Cyrus the Great, II, King of Anshan (559–530 BC), King of Kings (?–530 BC)
- Cambyses II, King of Kings (530–522 BC)
- Smerdis, King of Kings (522 BC)
- Gaumata, false Smerdis, usurper King (522 BC)
- Darius I, King of Kings (522–486 BC)

- Urartu (complete list) –

- Rusa III, King (629–590/615 BC)
- Sarduri IV, King (615–595 BC)
- Rusa IV, King (595–585 BC)

== Europe ==
=== Europe: Balkans ===
- Athens (complete list) –

- Critias, Archon (600–599 BC)
- Cypselus, Archon (597–596 BC)
- Telecles, Archon (596–595 BC)
- Philombrotus, Archon (595–594 BC)
- Solon, Archon (594–593 BC)
- Dropides, Archon (593–592 BC)
- Eucrates, Archon (592–591 BC)
- Simon, Archon (591–590 BC)
- Phormion, Archon (589–588 BC)
- Philippus, Archon (588–587 BC)
- Damasias, Archon (582–581 BC)
- Damasias, Archon (581–580 BC)
- Archestratidas, Archon (577–576 BC)

- Aristomenes, Archon (570–569 BC)
- Hippocleides, Archon (566–565 BC)
- Komeas, Archon (561–560 BC)
- Hegestratus, Archon (560–559 BC)
- Hegesias, Archon (556–555 BC)
- Euthidemus, Archon (555–554 BC)
- Erxicleides, Archon (548–547 BC)
- Thespius, Archon (547–546 BC)
- Phormion, Archon (546–545 BC)
- Thericles, Archon (533–532 BC)
- Philoneus, Archon (528–527 BC)
- Onetor, Archon (527–526 BC)
- Hippias, Archon (526–525 BC)

- Cleisthenes, Archon (525–524 BC)
- Miltiades, Archon (524–523 BC)
- Calliades, Archon (523–522 BC)
- Pisistratus, Archon (522–521 BC)
- Hebron (?), Archon (518–517 BC)
- Harpactides, Archon (511–510 BC)
- Scamandrius, Archon (510–509 BC)
- Lysagoras, Archon (509–508 BC)
- Isagoras, Archon (508–507 BC)
- Alcmeon, Archon (507–506 BC)
- Acestorides, Archon (504–503 BC)
- Hermocreon, Archon (501–500 BC)

- Corinth –

- Periander, Tyrant (c.627–c.587 BC)
- Psammetichus, Tyrant (c.587 BC–?)

- Macedonia: Argead dynasty (complete list) –

- Aeropus I, King (602–576 BC)
- Alcetas I, King (576–547 BC)
- Amyntas I, King (547–498 BC)

- Sparta (complete list) –

- Ariston, King (c.550–515 BC)
- Demaratus, King (c.515–491 BC)

=== Europe: South ===
- Roman Kingdom (complete list) –

- Lucius Tarquinius Priscus, King (616–579 BC)
- Servius Tullius, King (578–535 BC)
- Lucius Tarquinius Superbus, King (535–510/509 BC)

- Roman Republic (complete list) –

- 509

- L. Iunius Brutus, Consul
- L. Tarquinius Collatinus, Consul
- Sp. Lucretius Tricipitinus, Consul suffectus
- P. Valerius Poplicola, Consul suffectus
- M. Horatius Pulvillus, Consul suffectus

- 508

- P. Valerius Poplicola, Consul
- T. Lucretius Tricipitinus, Consul

- 507

- P. Valerius Poplicola, Consul
- M. Horatius Pulvillus, Consul

- 506

- Sp. Larcius Rufus (or Flavus), Consul
- T. Herminius Aquilinus, Consul

- 505

- M. Valerius Volusus, Consul
- P. Postumius Tubertus, Consul

- 504

- P. Valerius Poplicola, Consul
- T. Lucretius Tricipitinus, Consul

- 503

- Agrippa Menenius Lanatus, Consul
- P. Postumius Tubertus, Consul

- 502

- Opet. Verginius Tricostus, Consul
- Sp. Cassius Vecellinus, Consul

- 501

- Post. Cominius Auruncus, Consul
- T. Lartius Flavus (or Rufus), Consul

=== Eurasia: Caucasus ===
- Kingdom of Armenia (complete list) –

- Orontes I Sakavakyats, King (570–560 BC)
- Tigranes Orontid, King (560–535 BC)
- Vahagn Orontid, King (6th century BC)
- Hidarnes I, King (late 6th century BC)
