= Latin War (498–493 BC) =

War fought between the Roman Republic and the Latin League from 498 BC to 493 BC

First Latin War
- Part of the Roman–Latin wars
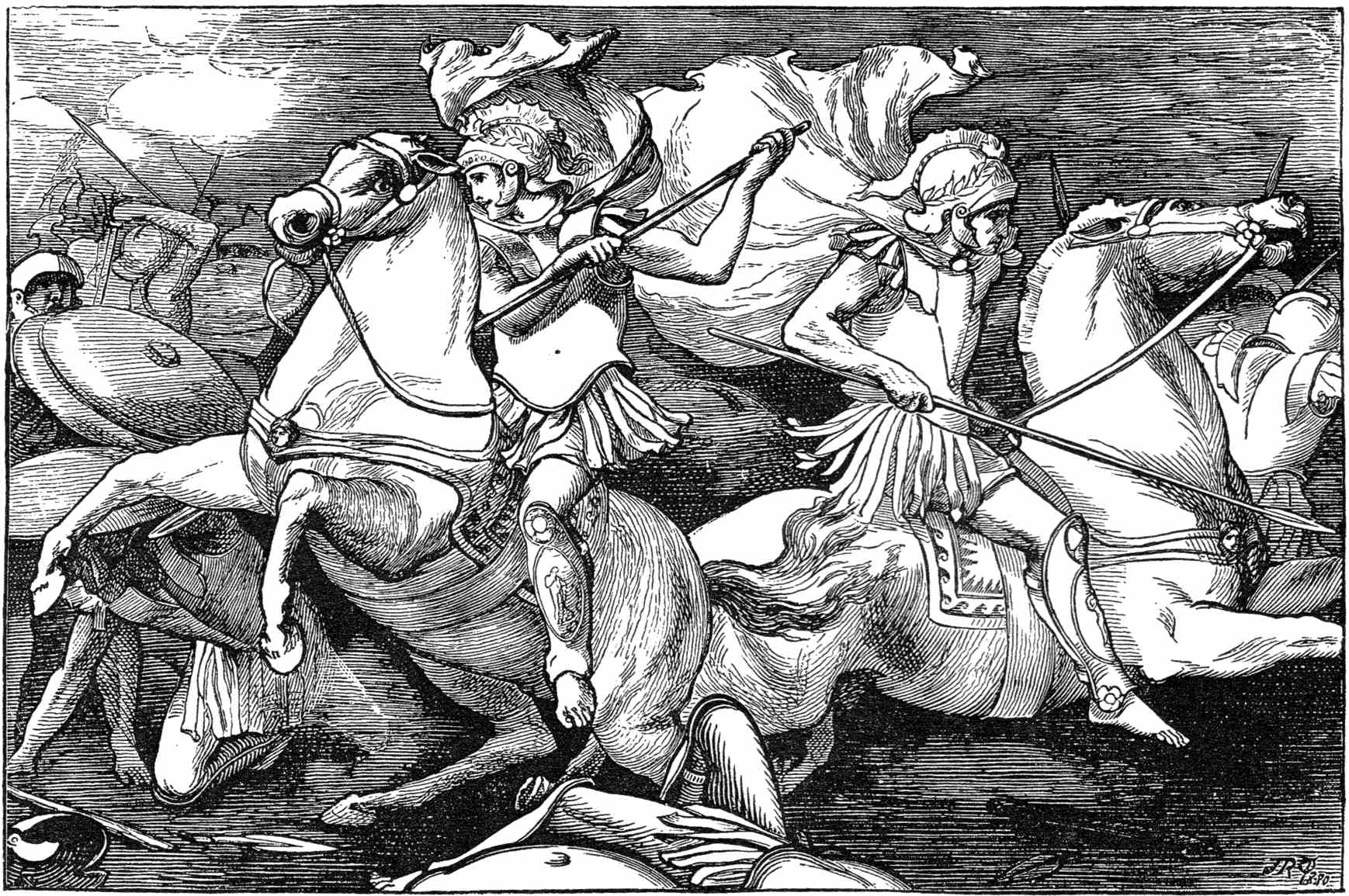
- Depiction of the Battle of Lake Regillus, the most well known battle of the war
Date	498–493 BC
Location	Latium
Result	Roman victory

Belligerents
Roman Republic	Latin League

Commanders and leaders
Sp. Cassius Vecellinus; Titus Largius; Aulus Regillensis; Titus Aebutius Elva	Octavius Mamilius; Tarquinius Superbus

The Latin War was a war fought between the Roman Republic and the Latin League from 498 BC to 493 BC.

== Historical context ==
According to the historical chronicles, (Note: After the sack of Rome in 390 BC by the Gauls, almost all of the historical records the Romans had previously kept were destroyed. As such, any Roman history dating prior to 390 BC may not be the most objective source) the beginnings of this war between the Romans and Latins can be seen as early as 501 BC, though the root causes date back much farther. In 501 BC, the Romans elected Titus Larcius as dictator with Spurius Cassius Vecellinus as his Master of the Horse, an overt indication of the expectation of conflict. There were two major incidents in 501 BC that likely provoked the Romans to elect a dictator. First, an incident arose between the Romans and the Sabines in which a group of Sabines ironically abducted a number of Roman women during a festival being held in Rome. This relatively trivial action led to a violent altercation which threatened to nearly bring the two cities to war even though Rome had decisively defeated the Sabines very recently sometime between 505 and 503 BC. The other and more significant cause for the appointment of a dictator was the agitation of the rest of the Latin League, a group of around 30 different Latin city-states which were situated throughout Latium, and what Rome correctly perceived to be their mobilization towards a war footing. Soon after the appointment of Titus Largius to the dictatorship, the Sabines sued for a quick peace, leaving Larcius to concentrate the brunt of his attention on the rest of the Latin League. The growing might of Rome in Latium had begun to upset the Latin balance of power. As a result, Octavius Mamilius, the leader of Tusculum began agitating the cities of the Latin League in a common cause against Rome. Mamilius was the son in law of the ex-Roman King Lucius Tarquinius Superbus who had gone into exile at Tusculum following his defeat at the Battle of Silva Arsia with the Etruscans and his failure to again capture Rome with the support of Clusium immediately after that.

== The war ==
The major decisive battle of this war was the Battle of Lake Regillus which was fought in 496 BC near Frascati. The Roman victory is largely attributed to decisive action on the part of the patrician cavalry units. According to Roman legends, Castor and Pollux are supposed to have fought on the Roman side of this battle as members of the famed cavalry units.

== Aftermath ==
The war ended with the Foedus Cassianum (English: Treaty of Cassius) which ended the war and formed a treaty of alliance between the Romans and the members of the Latin League. The treaty was named after the contemporary Roman Consul, Spurius Cassius Vecellinus. This conflict marked the turning point where Rome became the dominant power in Latium although it still recognized the autonomy and independent rights of the various Latin city states and did not annex any of the cities to its banners. The treaty stipulated that the Latins were to provide military assistance in the event of external threats and that any armies raised in this manner were to be under Roman command. The treaty further legalized marriage between Roman citizens and Latins which had been a previous point of contention, and reinstated all trade between the cities.

== See also ==
- Latin War
