= Battle of Pometia =

Roman forces defeat revolt by two Latin towns, Pometia and Cora (c.502 BC)

- Part of the Roman–Latin wars
Date	502 BC
Location	Pometia, Italy
Result	Roman victory

Belligerents
Roman Republic	Pometia; Cora

Commanders and leaders
Agrippa Menenius; Publius Postumius	Unknown

Strength
60,000 infantry 2,300 cavalry	30,000 infantry 10,000 cavalry

Casualties and losses
2,750 killed and wounded	35,000 killed Only 3,000 escaped

The Battle of Pometia took place in 502 BC, a year after a revolt by two Latin towns, Pometia and Cora, against Rome. A Roman army led by the consuls Agrippa Menenius Lanatus and Publius Postumius Tubertus was eventually successful in forcing the Pometians to surrender.

== Background ==
In 503 BC, two Latin towns, Pometia and Cora, said by Livy to be colonies of Rome, revolted against Rome. They had the assistance of the southern Aurunci tribe.

== Battle ==
Livy says that a Roman army led by the consuls Agrippa Menenius Lanatus and Publius Postumius Tubertus met the enemy on the frontiers and was victorious, after which the war was confined to Pometia. Livy says many enemy prisoners were slaughtered by each side. Livy also says that the consuls celebrated a triumph, however the Fasti Triumphales record that an ovation was celebrated by Postumius and a triumph by Menenius, both over the Sabines.

== Aftermath ==
In the following year the consuls were Opiter Virginius and Spurius Cassius. Livy says that they attempted to take Pometia by storm, but then resorted to siege engines. However the Aurunci launched a successful sally, destroying the siege engines, wounding many, and nearly killing one of the consuls. The Romans retreated to Rome, recruited additional troops, and returned to Pometia. They rebuilt the siege engines and when they were about to take the town, the Pometians surrendered. The Aurunci leaders were beheaded, the Pometians sold into slavery, the town razed and the land sold. Livy says the consuls celebrated a triumph as a result of the victory. The Fasti Triumphales record only one triumph, by Cassius (possibly over the Sabines although the inscription is unclear).
