= Herminia gens =

Ancient Roman family

The gens Herminia was a patrician family at Ancient Rome. Members of this gens occur in history at the very beginning of the Republic down to the middle of the fifth century BC. Two of them held the consulship: Titus Herminius Aquilinus in 506 BC, and Lars Herminius Aquilinus in 448. After this the Herminii disappear from history, although a few are known from inscriptions; one of these was consul under the Empire.

== Origin ==
It is uncertain whether the Herminii should be regarded as a Sabine or Etruscan family. Roman scholars seem to have considered them Etruscans; the consul of 448 BC bears a distinctly Etruscan praenomen, and Silius Italicus gives the name to an Etruscan fisherman. On the other hand, Her- is a frequent element at the beginning of Oscan names, and in the legend recounting how Titus Herminius held the Sublician bridge alongside Publius Horatius and Spurius Larcius, Herminius seems to represent the Sabine element of the Roman populus, while Horatius represents the Latins, and Lartius the Etruscans.

== Praenomina ==
The praenomina associated with the early Herminii are Titus and Lars. (Note: In place of Lars, some sources give Spurius or Lucius.) To these, epigraphic sources add Lucius, Marcus, and Quintus. Lars is an Etruscan praenomen; the others were of Latin origin, (Note: Some scholars believe that Titus was originally a Sabine praenomen, though adopted by the Romans at a very remote period.) and common throughout Roman history.

== Branches and cognomina ==
The only distinct cognomen associated with the Herminii of the early Republic is Aquilinus, apparently derived from aquila, an eagle. Coritinesanus or Corinitesanus is sometimes given in place of this for Lars Herminius, the consul of 448 BC. Other surnames appear in imperial times.

== Members ==
This list includes abbreviated praenomina. For an explanation of this practice, see filiation.

- Titus Herminius Aquilinus, was a commander in the army of Lucius Tarquinius Superbus, the last Roman king. After the overthrow of the monarchy, he fought to hold the Sublician bridge against Lars Porsena. Aquilinus was consul in 506 BC. During the Battle of Lake Regillus, circa 499, he slew Octavius Mamilius, leader of the Latin forces, but was himself slain while retrieving his foe's armor.
- Lars Herminius T. f. Aquilinus (or Coritinesanus), consul in 448 BC.
- Herminia M. l. Zosima, a freedwoman buried at Venusia, aged twenty-two, in a tomb dating between the end of the first century BC, and the middle of the first century AD.
- Herminius, dedicated a first-century tomb at Rome for himself and his wife, Herminia Fort[...].
- Herminia Fort[...], buried at Rome in a first-century tomb built by her husband, Herminius, for himself and his family.
- Quintus Herminius Magnus, a native of Cisalpine Gaul, served in a cohort of the Praetorian Guard, according to an inscription from Rome dating between AD 135 and 137.
- Lucius Herminius L. f. Crispinus, a Roman senator of imperial times, evidently had been consul in an unknown year.

== See also ==
- List of Roman gentes

== Bibliography ==
- Dionysius of Halicarnassus, Romaike Archaiologia (Roman Antiquities).
- Titus Livius (Livy), History of Rome.
- Liber de Praenominibus, a short treatise of uncertain authorship, traditionally appended to Valerius Maximus' Factorum ac Dictorum Memorabilium (Memorable Facts and Sayings).
- Lucius Mestrius Plutarchus (Plutarch), Lives of the Noble Greeks and Romans (Parallel Lives).
- Tiberius Catius Silius Italicus, Punica.
- Barthold Georg Niebuhr, The History of Rome, Julius Charles Hare and Connop Thirlwall, trans., John Smith, Cambridge (1828).
- Dictionary of Greek and Roman Biography and Mythology, William Smith, ed., Little, Brown and Company, Boston (1849).
- Theodor Mommsen et alii, Corpus Inscriptionum Latinarum (The Body of Latin Inscriptions, abbreviated CIL), Berlin-Brandenburgische Akademie der Wissenschaften (1853–present).
- Karl Otfried Müller, Die Etrusker, Albert Heitz, Stuttgart (1877).
- René Cagnat et alii, L'Année épigraphique (The Year in Epigraphy, abbreviated AE), Presses Universitaires de France (1888–present).
- George Davis Chase, "The Origin of Roman Praenomina", in Harvard Studies in Classical Philology, vol. VIII, pp. 103–184 (1897).
- D.P. Simpson, Cassell's Latin and English Dictionary, Macmillan Publishing Company, New York (1963).
