= 503 BC =

503 BC in various calendars
- Gregorian calendar: 503 BC; DIII BC
- Ab urbe condita: 251
- Ancient Egypt era: XXVII dynasty, 23
- Pharaoh: Darius I of Persia, 19
- Ancient Greek Olympiad (summer): 69th Olympiad, year 2
- Assyrian calendar: 4248
- Balinese saka calendar: N/A
- Bengali calendar: −1096 – −1095
- Berber calendar: 448
- Buddhist calendar: 42
- Burmese calendar: −1140
- Byzantine calendar: 5006–5007
- Chinese calendar: 丁酉年 (Fire Rooster); 2195 or 1988 — to — 戊戌年 (Earth Dog); 2196 or 1989
- Coptic calendar: −786 – −785
- Discordian calendar: 664
- Ethiopian calendar: −510 – −509
- Hebrew calendar: 3258–3259
- Hindu calendars
- Vikram Samvat: −446 – −445
- Shaka Samvat: N/A
- Kali Yuga: 2598–2599
- Holocene calendar: 9498
- Iranian calendar: 1124 BP – 1123 BP
- Islamic calendar: 1159 BH – 1158 BH
- Javanese calendar: N/A
- Julian calendar: N/A
- Korean calendar: 1831
- Minguo calendar: 2414 before ROC 民前2414年
- Nanakshahi calendar: −1970
- Thai solar calendar: 40–41
- Tibetan calendar: མེ་མོ་བྱ་ལོ་ (female Fire-Bird) −376 or −757 or −1529 — to — ས་ཕོ་ཁྱི་ལོ་ (male Earth-Dog) −375 or −756 or −1528

The year 503 BC was a year of the pre-Julian Roman calendar. In the Roman Empire it was known as the Year of the Consulship of Lanatus and Tubertus (or, less frequently, year 251 Ab urbe condita). The denomination 503 BC for this year has been used since the early medieval period, when the Anno Domini calendar era became the prevalent method in Europe for naming years.

== Events ==
=== By place ===
==== Roman Republic ====
- The Latin towns of Pometia and Cora, with the assistance of the Aurunci, revolt against Rome.

== Births ==
- Zhuansun Shi, a disciple of Confucius

== Deaths ==
- Publius Valerius Publicola (or Poplicola, his agnomen meaning "friend of the people"), one of four Roman aristocrats who led the overthrow of the monarchy.
