= Titus Larcius =

Early 5th-century BC Roman senator and general

- Years active: c. 501–493 BC
- Office: Consul (501, 498 BC); Dictator (501 BC)
- Relatives: Spurius Larcius (brother)

Titus Larcius (surnamed Flavus or Rufus; fl. c. 501–493 BC) was a Roman general and statesman during the early Republic, who served twice as consul and became the first Roman dictator.

== Background ==
The Larcii, whose nomen is also spelled Lartius and Largius, were an Etruscan family at Rome during the early years of the Republic. Their nomen is derived from the Etruscan praenomen Lars. Titus' brother, Spurius Larcius, was one of the heroes of the Republic, who defended the wooden bridge over the Tiber at the side of Horatius Cocles and Titus Herminius. Titus held the consulship twice, in 501 and 498. His brother Spurius Larcius also was twice consul, in 506 and 490 BC.

== Career ==
Larcius' first consulship was in 501 BC, the ninth year of the Republic. His colleague was Postumus Cominius Auruncus. During their year of office, there was a disturbance at Rome, which was attributed to the actions of a group of young Sabines. Only the previous year, the consul Spurius Cassius Vecellinus had defeated the Sabines near Cures, and for a while it appeared that the war might be rekindled. Tensions were also high because it was anticipated that war with the Latins was imminent. Octavius Mamilius, the prince of Tusculum, and son-in-law of Lucius Tarquinius Superbus, the seventh and last King of Rome, was forming an alliance amongst the thirty towns of Latium, with the aim of restoring Tarquin to the throne.

In these circumstances it was decided to appoint a single magistrate, originally called the praetor maximus or magister populi, "master of the infantry", but afterwards known simply as the dictator, to oversee the defence of the city. The dictator held supreme authority in the exercise of his duties, and the people had no right to appeal from his decisions, as they could under the consuls. However, the command of the dictator was limited to a period of six months. The Senate directed the consuls to nominate a dictator, and Cominius chose his colleague, Larcius. The dictator then proceeded to nominate Spurius Cassius, who had triumphed over the Sabines the previous year, as his magister equitum, or "master of the horse".

The creation of this magistracy is said to have alarmed the Sabines, who sent envoys to Rome in order to avert war. The negotiations were unsuccessful, and war was declared, but both sides were reluctant to take the field, and no battle occurred. During the remainder of his office, Larcius held the census, negotiated with the various Latin towns in hopes of retaining some old allies and gaining new ones, and presided over the consular elections for the following year. He then laid down his office before the expiration of his term, setting a precedent for future dictators.

Larcius held the consulship a second time in 498 BC, with Quintus Cloelius Siculus. During this year, the long anticipated war with the Latins began. The dictator Aulus Postumius Albus led the Roman forces to victory at the Battle of Lake Regillus, while the consul Larcius captured the town of Fidenae. After leaving his magistracy, Larcius is said by Dionysius to have dedicated the temple of Saturn at the foot of the Capitoline Hill.

As praefectus urbi in 494, Larcius unsuccessfully advocated measures to relieve the plebs from the burdens of debt; and when the plebeians seceded from the city and encamped on the Mons Sacer, Larcius was one of the envoys sent by the senate to treat with them. The embassy was successful, and resulted in the institution of the tribunes of the people.

Also in 493, Larcius served as legate to the consul Cominius, his colleague in 501, at the siege of Corioli, where Gaius Marcius Coriolanus gained fame through his valour.

== Historical uncertainty ==
An alternative tradition states that the first dictator was Manius Valerius, the son of Marcus Valerius Volusus, consul in 505 BC. However, the historian Livy believed it unlikely that a man who had not yet been consul would be appointed the first dictator, or that Manius Valerius would have been nominated in place of his father. Another tradition places the institution of the dictatorship three years later, in 498 BC, during Larcius' second consulship. In that year, Livy states that Aulus Postumius Albus was appointed dictator, and led the Roman army to victory over the Latins at the Battle of Lake Regillus. However, this battle is also placed by some authorities in 496, when Postumius was consul.

== In literature ==
Larcius appears as a Roman general in William Shakespeare's play, Coriolanus, based largely on the account of Coriolanus' life given in Plutarch, although Shakespeare may also have read Livy, and perhaps Dionysius.

== Bibliography ==
- Dionysius of Halicarnassus, Romaike Archaiologia (Roman Antiquities).
- Titus Livius (Livy), History of Rome.
- Lucius Mestrius Plutarchus (Plutarch), Lives of the Noble Greeks and Romans.
- Dictionary of Greek and Roman Biography and Mythology, William Smith, ed., Little, Brown and Company, Boston (1849).
- George Davis Chase, "The Origin of Roman Praenomina", in Harvard Studies in Classical Philology, vol. VIII, pp. 103–184 (1897).
- T. Robert S. Broughton, The Magistrates of the Roman Republic, American Philological Association (1952–1986).
- Oxford Classical Dictionary, N. G. L. Hammond and H. H. Scullard, eds., Clarendon Press, Oxford (Second Edition, 1970).
- Münzer, Friedrich, "Larcius 2", Realencyclopädie der classischen Altertumswissenschaft (RE, PW), volume XII, part 1, columns 797–798 (Stuttgart, 1924).
- Ogilvie, R.M. (1965). A Commentary on Livy, Books 1–5. Oxford: Clarendon Press.

Political offices
Preceded by Opiter Verginius Tricostus; Spurius Cassius Vecellinus	Roman consul 501 BC with Postumus Cominius Auruncus	Succeeded by Servius Sulpicius Camerinus Cornutus; Manius Tullius Longus
Preceded by Titus Aebutius Helva; Gaius Vetusius Geminus Cicurinus	Roman consul II; 498 BC; With: Quintus Cloelius Siculus	Succeeded by Aulus Sempronius Atratinus; Marcus Minucius Augurinus
