= Roman–Hernici conflicts =

Roman wars of conquest against the Hernici

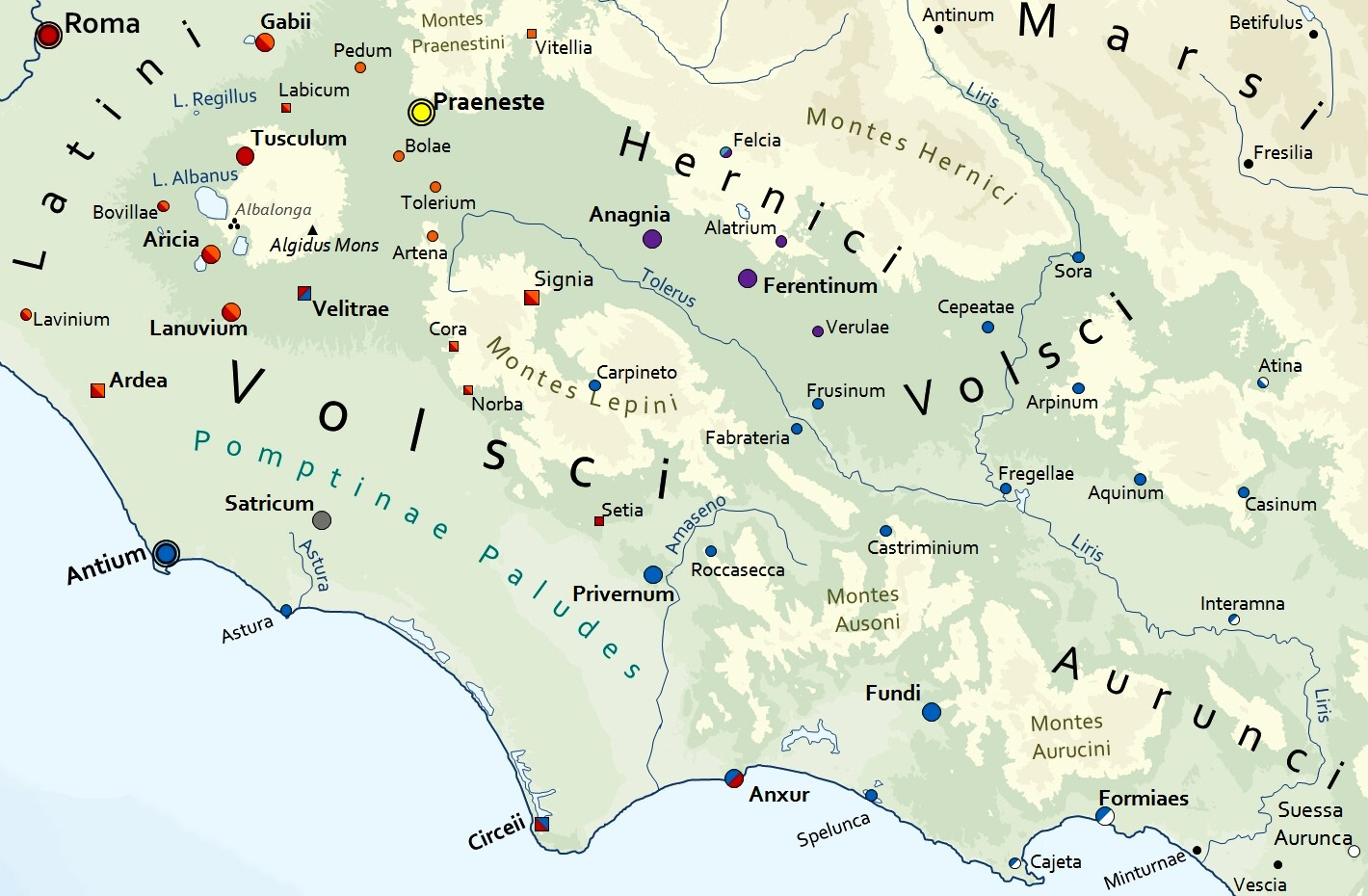
Settlements in central Italy (c. 400 BCE). Hernici Latins (including Rome) Volsci

The Roman–Hernici conflicts occurred intermittently in the 5th and 4th century BCE. Both were Italic peoples settled in Latium, with the Romans speaking Latin and the Hernici an Osco-Umbrian language.

For most of the 5th century BC, the Roman Republic had been allied with the other Latin states and the Hernici to successfully fend off the Aequi and the Volsci. In the early 4th century BC, this alliance fell apart. A war fought between Rome and the Hernici in the years 366–358 BC ended in Roman victory and the submission of the Hernici. Rome also defeated a rebellion by some Hernician cities in 307–306 BC. The rebellious Hernici were incorporated directly into the Roman Republic, while those who had stayed loyal retained their autonomy and nominal independence. In the course of the following century, the Hernici became indistinguishable from their Latin and Roman neighbours and disappeared as a separate people.

== The Foedus Cassianum – 5th century BC ==
From at least the early fifth century BC there were disputes between Rome and the Hernici.

In 495 BC, the Hernici joined the Volsci in an unsuccessful invasion of Roman territory.

In 487 BC, they again engaged the Romans in battle, and were defeated by the Romans under the leadership of the Roman consul Gaius Aquillius Tuscus.

In the following year, 486 BC, the Hernici entered into a treaty with Rome. Dionysius of Halicarnassus says the terms were similar to the Foedus Cassianum, a mutual military alliance among the Latin cities with Rome as the leading partner. However, it is unclear whether the Hernici were admitted as a party to that same treaty, or to a separate similar treaty with Rome. The terms of the treaty included that the Hernici were to cede two thirds of their land. Debate about the distribution of that land amongst Romans and the Latin allies caused discord in Rome, which in turn led to the trial and execution in 485 BC of the three-times consul Spurius Cassius Vecellinus for high treason, ironically having been the person who negotiated the treaty with both the Latin allies and the Hernici and for whom the treaty was named.

While the precise workings of the Foedus Cassianum remains uncertain, its overall purpose seems clear. During the 5th century, the Latins were threatened by invasion from the Aequi and the Volsci, as part of a larger pattern of Sabellian-speaking peoples migrating out of the Apennines and into the plains. Fighting is recorded against either the Aequi, the Volsci, or both, almost every year during the first half of the 5th century. This annual warfare would have been dominated by raids and counter-raids rather than the pitched battles described by the ancient sources. During the second half of the 5th century, the Latin-Hernician alliance appears to have stemmed the tide. The sources records the founding of several Roman colonies during this era, while mention of wars against the Aequi and Volsci become less frequent. At the same time, this would lessen the need to maintain the alliance. This was especially true for Rome, which, after her conquest of Veii in 396, was clearly the most powerful state in Latium.

== Defection of the Hernici – 380s BC ==
Livy writes that in 389, after a hundred years of loyal friendship, the Latins and Hernici defected from Rome in 389, after Rome had been sacked by the Gauls. Then in 386 and 385 Latin and Hernician men were found fighting for the Volsci. Rome protested, and refused to hand back their Latin and Hernician prisoners, but did not declare war.

Livy viewed the sack of Rome by the Gauls as a grave disaster that encouraged Rome's neighbours to rise against her. However, modern historians believe that the ancient historical tradition exaggerate the impact of the sack. Likewise, they disagree with Livy's views that the Hernici defected from Rome; as Livy notes, no open warfare between Rome and the Hernici is recorded for this time period. Rather, the military alliance between Rome and the Latins and Hernici appear to have been allowed to wither. This might have been a conscious policy by Rome to free herself from treaty obligations and so gain wider freedom of action. However, the Latins and the Hernici, no longer threatened by the Aequi and Volsci, could also have seized the opportunity of the Gallic Sack to abandon their alliance with an increasingly dominating Rome. While it is possible that this led to some Latin and Hernician warriors fighting for the Volsci, these could also be inventions by Livy to provide a literary motif to his narrative. Except for these doubtful notices then, no conflicts are recorded between Romans and Hernici until 366.

== The Hernician War 362–358 BCE ==
After some mostly peaceful years, in 362, the Romans went to war against the Hernici, starting a period of unprecedented successful warfare for the Romans. Livy provides the only narrative account for this Hernican War. In addition, two triumphs and an ovation against the Hernici are recorded in the Fasti Triumphales.

=== Outbreak of the war ===
According to Livy, in 366, it was reported in Rome that the Hernici had rebelled, but nothing was done to prevent any action from being taken by the plebeian consul. In 363, to ward off pestilence, the Romans nominated L. Manlius Imperiosus dictator to perform the ancient ritual of "driving in the nail" at the temple of Jupiter Optimus Maximus. Manlius, however, attempted to use his appointment to secure command in the war against the Hernici, but, faced with public resentment and resistance from the tribunes of the plebs, he was forced to lay down his office. After fetials had been sent to the Hernici to demand satisfaction without result, the Roman Assembly in 362 voted for war against the Hernici. L. Genucius Aventinensis became the first plebeian consul to command in war, but the Hernici caught Genucius in an ambush; the consul was killed and the Roman legions routed.

As usual, Livy makes Rome the offended party, but Roman designs on Hernician land might well have been real cause of this war. The failed levy of L. Manlius is probably not historical, but has likely been invented as a motive for the famous prosecution of L. Manlius, traditionally dated to 362.

=== Dictatorship of Appius Claudius Crassus ===
The surviving patrician consul, Q. Servilius Ahala, then nominated Appius Claudius Crassus as dictator. Pending the arrival of the dictator, C. Sulpicius Peticus assumed command of the Roman army. The Hernici had surrounded the Roman camp but, led by Sulpicius, the Romans sortied and forced them to retreat. With the arrival of the dictator with fresh forces from Rome, the strength of the Roman army was doubled. On their side the Hernici called up all their men, and formed a special privileged unit of 3,200 picked men. The Romans and Hernici had camped on each side of a two-mile-broad plain, and the battle took place in the middle. When the Roman cavalry found that they could not break the enemy lines by normal means, they dismounted and charged as infantry. They were countered by the special picked men of the Hernici. After a hard struggle, the Roman knights got the best of this contest and the Hernici were routed. The next day, the Romans were delayed in attacking the Hernician camp due to difficulty in obtaining favourable omens and consequently failed to take the camp before darkness broke off fighting. During the night, the Hernici abandoned their camp and withdrew. Seeing the retreating Hernici pass by their walls, the people of Signia sallied out and scattered them in flight. Roman casualties had been heavy, a quarter of their whole force, and a considerable number of their cavalry had fallen.

Livy's extended narrative of this campaign is full of standard annalistic features and very little of the detail provided can have been derived from authentic records. The first military command ever held by a plebeian consul and the subsequent dictatorship of the conservative patrician Appius Claudius ties Livy's account into the Struggle of the Orders. Because of this literary character of the episode, and the absence of a triumph for Appius Claudius in the Fasti Triumphales, some historians have rejected Appius Claudius' dictatorship. Oakley (1998) does not consider these arguments decisive, but believes the basic notice of a Roman victory against the Hernici in 362 to be historical, and perhaps also the dictatorship of Appius Claudius and the involvement of Signia as well.

=== Rome triumphant ===
Livy only provides brief narratives for the remaining years of the Hernician war, being more interested in the Gallic Wars Rome was fighting at the same time. In 361, the Roman consuls invaded Hernician territory. Finding no enemy in the field, they attacked and took Ferentinum. In 360 consul M. Fabius Ambustus received command of the war against the Hernici. Fabius defeated the Hernici first in some minor battles and then in a major one where the Hernici attacked in full strength. For his victories, Fabius entered the City of Rome in ovation. In 358 the Romans assigned command of the Hernician war to consul C. Plautius Proculus. The consul defeated the Hernici and reduced them to submission. The Pomptina and Publilia tribes were also formed that year. The Fasti Triumphales records a triumph by consul C. Sulpicius Peticus against the Hernici in 361, the ovation of M. Fabius Ambustus in 360, which according to the Fasti took place on 5 September, and the triumph of consul C. Plautius Proculus in 358, which it dates to 15 May.

There is no particular reason to doubt the historicity of these Roman victories, though it is unlikely that Livy's description of Fabius first winning several minor battles and then a major battle, perhaps a condensation of a longer account found in his sources, is derived from authentic records. In 358, the Latins renewed their alliance with Rome when Latium was threatened by invasion from the Gauls. Fear of the Gauls might also have influenced the Hernici to accept a new treaty with Rome, but the Hernici probably obtained less favourable terms than their old alliance. Ferentinum is described as independent in 306, and so must have been handed back to the Hernici at some point, perhaps as part of the peace terms. Of the two Roman tribes created in 358, the Pomptina was evidently located in the Pomptine on territory Rome had taken from the Volsci. The location of the Publilia is less certain; modern historians generally locate it on territory taken from the Hernici, but it is possible that the Publilia was also located on former Volscian land.

== Final rebellion of the Hernici 307–306 BCE ==
Towards the end of the Second Samnite War, in 307 BC, the Romans found a number of Hernician men among prisoners taken in battle against the Samnites. These were placed under guard in various Latin towns while the Romans investigated whether they had fought for the Samnites voluntarily or had been conscripted. In response, part of the Hernici, under the leadership of the city of Anagnia, rose in rebellion in 306, but were easily defeated by the Romans that same year. As punishment, Anagnia and the other towns that had rebelled were annexed into the Roman Republic, their people becoming civitas sine suffragio. Aletrium, Ferentinum and Verulae were allowed to retain their autonomy and enjoy similar political rights as the Latins. Marcus Tullius Cicero later claims in his treatise De Officiis that the Hernici were granted "full rights of citizenship" after being conquered. However, while Cicero agrees Livy that the Hernici were granted a form of citizenship he claims they were granted full citizenship as opposed to civitas sine suffragio.

== Bibliography ==
=== Primary sources ===
- Livius, Ab Urbe Condita. (c. 27–9 BCE, in Latin).
  - Livy (1905). From the Founding of the City. Translated by Canon Roberts.
- Cicero, De Officiis ("On Duties"; 44 BCE).

=== Literature ===
- Cornell, T. J. (1995). The Beginnings of Rome – Italy and Rome from the Bronze Age to the Punic Wars (c. 1000–264 BC). New York: Routledge. p. 528. ISBN 978-0-415-01596-7.
- Oakley, Stephen P. (1997). A Commentary on Livy Books VI–X, Volume 1: Introduction and Book VI. Oxford: Oxford University Press. p. 799. ISBN 0-19-815277-9.
- Oakley, Stephen P. (1998). A Commentary on Livy Books VI–X, Volume 2: Books VII–VIII. Oxford: Oxford University Press. p. 880. ISBN 978-0-19-815226-2.
