= Publius Postumius Tubertus =

Roman consul in 505 and 503 BC

Publius Postumius Tubertus was a Roman politician who was consul in 505 BC and 503 BC. He was the first of the patrician gens Postumia to obtain the consulship. Ten years later, he was one of the envoys sent by the Roman Senate to negotiate with the plebeians during the first secessio plebis. The outcome of those negotiations reunited the Roman people, and established the tribunes of the plebs, one of the most important institutions of the Roman Republic.

== Biography ==
Postumius was the son of Quintus.

His first consulship came in 505 BC, the fifth year of the Republic. Together with his colleague, Marcus Valerius Volusus, he fought against the Sabines, whom they defeated decisively near Tibur, obtaining a triumph.

Postumius was consul for the second time in 503 BC. Livy records that he fought and defeated the Aurunci, and captured the town of Pometia, obtaining a second triumph. Other authorities state that he fought against the Sabines again, at first with little success, but that he was eventually victorious, and was awarded an ovation, or lesser triumph, which he celebrated on 3 April 503 BC. This was the first occasion that this honour was bestowed upon a magistrate of the Republic. Additionally, according to Jerome, Postumius and his colleague, Agrippa Menenius Lanatus, held a census during their term of office.

In 493 BC, Postumius and Menenius were among the ten ambassadors sent by the senate to treat with the plebs gathered on the Mons Sacer during the first secession. Led by Menenius, the envoys successfully negotiated an agreement under which the patricians would forgive some of the debt owed by the plebeians; the terms of the agreement also established the office of the tribuni plebis, or "tribunes of the people", who received the power to veto acts of the magistrates and the senate.

In consequence of his deeds and reputation, Postumius and his descendants were accorded the privilege of being buried within the city walls.

== See also ==
- Postumia gens

== Bibliography ==
- Marcus Tullius Cicero, De Legibus.
- Dionysius of Halicarnassus, Romaike Archaiologia (Roman Antiquities).
- Titus Livius (Livy), History of Rome.
- Gaius Plinius Secundus (Pliny the Elder), Historia Naturalis (Natural History).
- Lucius Mestrius Plutarchus (Plutarch), Lives of the Noble Greeks and Romans.
- Eusebius Sophronius Hieronymus (St. Jerome), In Chronicon Eusebii (The Chronicon of Eusebius).
- Joannes Zonaras, Epitome Historiarum (Epitome of History).
- Dictionary of Greek and Roman Biography and Mythology, William Smith, ed., Little, Brown and Company, Boston (1849).
- T. Robert S. Broughton, The Magistrates of the Roman Republic, American Philological Association (1952–1986).

Preceded by Spurius Larcius and Titus Herminius Aquilinus	Consul of the Roman Republic with Marcus Valerius Volusus; 505 BC	Succeeded by Publius Valerius Poplicola and Titus Lucretius Tricipitinus
Preceded by Publius Valerius Poplicola and Titus Lucretius Tricipitinus	Consul of the Roman Republic with Agrippa Menenius Lanatus; 503 BC	Succeeded by Opiter Verginius Tricostus and Spurius Cassius Vecellinus
