= Agrippa Menenius Lanatus (consul 503 BC) =

Roman general and consul (died 493 BC)

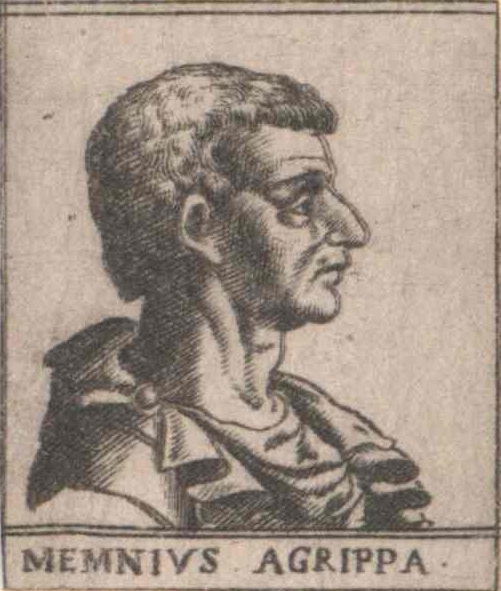

Consul of the Roman Republic
- In office 1 September 503 BC – 29 August 502 BC Serving with Publius Postumius Tubertus
- Preceded by: Publius Valerius Publicola, Titus Lucretius Tricipitinus
- Succeeded by: Opiter Verginius Tricostus (consul 502 BC), Spurius Cassius Vecellinus

Personal details
- Born: Unknown Ancient Rome
- Died: 493 BC Ancient Rome
- Children: Titus Menenius Lanatus, Agrippa Menenius T. f. Agrippae n. Lanatus

Agrippa Menenius Lanatus (died 493 BC) was a consul of the Roman Republic in 503 BC, with Publius Postumius Tubertus. He was victorious over the Sabines and was awarded a triumph which he celebrated on 4 April 503 BC. According to Livy, he also led Roman troops against the Latin town of Pometia. In some traditions he and his colleague also completed a census during their consulship.

According to Livy, Menenius was chosen by the patricians during the secession of the plebs in 494 BC to persuade the plebs to end their secession. Livy says that Menenius told the soldiers a fable about the parts of the human body and how each has its purpose in the greater function of the body. The rest of the body thought the stomach was getting a free ride so the body decided to stop nourishing the stomach. Soon, the other parts became fatigued and unable to function. So, they realized that the stomach did serve a purpose and they were nothing without it. In the story, the stomach represents the patrician class and the other body parts represent the plebs. Eventually, Livy says, an accord was reached between the patricians and the plebs, which included creating the office of tribune of the plebs.

It is not improbable that Saint Paul, an educated Roman citizen, knew this story (not necessarily through Livy) and was prompted by it in his use of the same parable when he admonished the Christians of Corinth that, for all their "diversity of gifts", they were all members of one body (I Cor. 12:13 ff.). However, the imagery was not new even for Livy. It appears in Xenophon's Memorabilia (2. iii. 18), and in Cicero's De Officiis (III. v. 22).

One puzzle about Menenius concerns his social status: was he was patrician or plebeian? Livy asserts that he was "an eloquent man and dear to the plebeians as being one of themselves by birth." On the other hand, he was sent to the plebs as a representative of the Senate, and he had held the office of consul. The consulship, according to the traditional historiography, was at this time reserved strictly for patricians. Ancient accounts of early Roman history are compromised by uneven use of sources, the author's bias toward either senatorial or popular interests, and sheer uncertainty. The existence of the "plebeian" and "patrician" social division in the earliest period of Rome's history has been questioned by modern scholars.

Menenius died in 493 BC. Livy records that during his life he had been beloved of both the senate and the plebs (particularly the latter since his involvement in ending their secession). As his estate lacked funds to pay for his funeral, the people contributed to his funeral expenses by way of a levy.

Menenius had a son, named Titus, who would become consul in 477 BC.

Menenius was also a character in William Shakespeare's Coriolanus. He is portrayed by Brian Cox in the 2011 film adaptation of the same name, in which director Ralph Fiennes plays the titular character.

== See also ==
- Menenia gens
- Agrippa (disambiguation)

Political offices
Preceded by Publius Valerius Publicola; Titus Lucretius Tricipitinus	Roman consul 503 BC; With: Publius Postumius Tubertus	Succeeded by Opiter Verginius Tricostus; Spurius Cassius Vecellinus
