= Marcus Horatius Pulvillus =

Late 6th century BC Roman politician involved in the expulsion of Rome's last king

Consul of the Roman Republic
- In office March 3 509 BC – 29 August 508 BC Serving with Publius Valerius Publicola
- Preceded by: Publius Valerius Publicola, Spurius Lucretius Tricipitinus
- Succeeded by: Publius Valerius Publicola, Titus Lucretius Tricipitinus
- In office 1 September 507 BC – 29 August 506 BC Serving with Publius Valerius Publicola
- Preceded by: Publius Valerius Publicola, Titus Lucretius Tricipitinus
- Succeeded by: Spurius Larcius, Titus Herminius Aquilinus

Personal details
- Born: Unknown Ancient Rome
- Died: unknown Ancient Rome
- Children: Gaius Horatius Pulvillus

Marcus Horatius Pulvillus was an aristocrat before and during the early Roman Republic at the time of the overthrow of the Roman monarchy. He was a suffect consul in 509 BC and elected again in 507 BC, according to the Varronian chronology.

== Biography ==
The Greek historian Dionysius of Halicarnassus describes him as a highly decorated revolutionary who was involved in the expulsion of Rome's last king Lucius Tarquinius Superbus. However Livy does not mention his role in the revolution.

He was a suffect consul in the first year of the Republic in 509 BC, elected to replace Spurius Lucretius Tricipitinus who died in office. His colleague was Publius Valerius Publicola, with whom he also held his second consulship in 507 BC.

Other sources claim that Marcus Horatius was also the Pontifex Maximus.

== Consecration of the Temple of Jupiter ==
Horatius consecrated the newly built Temple of Jupiter Optimus Maximus on the Capitoline Hill during his first consulship in 509 BC. Livy, Dio Cassius, and Plutarch say that the honour fell to Horatius by lot, rather than to Valerius, while Dionysius of Halicarnassus says Valerius was on campaign at the time. Dionysius and Tacitus also clearly place the consecration of the temple in the second consulship of Horatius, in 507 BC, not in his first consulship as Livy writes.

According to Livy, Valerius' friends were angered that the honour did not fall to Valerius. As Horatius was offering the prayer to the gods for the consecration of the temple, Valerius' friends announced that Horatius' son had died and, since his son remained unburied, Horatius was not fit to complete the ceremony. Horatius nevertheless ordered the body buried, and completed the ceremony.

== Cognomen ==
His surname appears as Pulvillus for the first time in Cicero's treatise De Domo Sua.

Political offices
Preceded by Publius Valerius Publicola; Spurius Lucretius Tricipitinus; 509 BC	Consul (Suffect) of the Roman Republic with Publius Valerius Publicola (Suffect); 509 BC	Succeeded by Publius Valerius Publicola; Titus Lucretius Tricipitinus
Preceded by Publius Valerius Publicola; Titus Lucretius Tricipitinus	Consul of the Roman Republic with Publius Valerius Poplicola; 507 BC	Succeeded by Spurius Larcius Rufus; Titus Herminius Aquilinus
