= Opiter Verginius Tricostus =

Roman aristocrat and consul (502 BC)

Consul of the Roman Republic
- In office 1 September 502 BC – 29 August 501 BC Serving with Spurius Cassius Vecellinus
- Preceded by: Agrippa Menenius Lanatus, Publius Postumius Tubertus
- Succeeded by: Postumus Cominius Auruncus, Titus Larcius

Personal details
- Born: Unknown; Ancient Rome
- Died: 486 BC? Ancient Rome
- Children: Proculus Verginius Tricostus Rutilus, Titus Verginius Tricostus Rutilus, Opiter Verginius Tricostus Esquilinus (consul 478 BC), Aulus Verginius Tricostus Rutilus

Opiter Verginius Tricostus served as consul of the early Roman Republic in 502 BC, with Spurius Cassius Vecellinus. He was the first from the powerful Verginia family to obtain the consulship.

Together with his colleague Spurius Cassius Vecellinus, Verginius Tricostus fought against the Aurunci, and took Pometia. Livy also says that the consuls celebrated a triumph for their victory, however the Fasti Triumphales record only one triumph, by Cassius.

He is listed in an incomplete text by Festus as numbering among the nine patricians burned in 486 BC for conspiring with his former consular colleague Cassius. Considering that this would have occurred during Opiter's son, Proculus, consulship, this narrative remains highly uncertain.

The filiation of a number of consular men in the following generation suggests they were Opiter Verginius' sons. They are: Proculus Verginius Tricostus Rutilus (consul 486 BC), Titus Verginius Tricostus Rutilus (consul 479 BC), Opiter Verginius Tricostus Esquilinus (consul 478 BC) and Aulus Verginius Tricostus Rutilus (consul 476 BC).

== See also ==
- Verginia gens

Political offices
Preceded by Agrippa Menenius Lanatus and Publius Postumius Tubertus	Consul of the Roman Republic with Spurius Cassius Vecellinus; 502 BC	Succeeded by Postumius Cominius Auruncus and Titus Lartius Flavus
