= Apiolae =

Ancient town of Latium

Coordinates: 41°43′23″N 12°38′17″E

Apiolae (also Appiolae) (Ancient Greek: Ἀπίολαι) was a town in ancient Latium, Italy belonging to the Sabines.

During the early semi-legendary history of Rome, in the reign of Rome's fifth king, Lucius Tarquinius Priscus, Apiolae took a leading role among the Latin cities in a war against Rome. Tarquinius besieged the city, took it by storm, and captured it with great slaughter. According to ancient sources, Apiolae was subsequently razed to the ground and its inhabitants sold into slavery.

The spoils taken from Apiolae were considerable and played an important role in early Roman state development: Livy records that they enabled Tarquinius to celebrate the Ludi Magni for the first time, while Valerius Antias states that the booty helped finance the initial construction of the Capitoline temple. Its precise location is uncertain, though later scholars have proposed a site southeast of Rome near the Appian Way.

== Sources ==
Livy, Ab urbe condita, 1:35
