= Marcus Valerius Volusus =

Late 6th century and early 5th century BC Roman general and consul

Consul of the Roman Republic
- In office 505 BC – 504 BC Serving with Publius Postumius Tubertus
- Preceded by: Spurius Larcius, Titus Herminius Aquilinus
- Succeeded by: Publius Valerius Publicola, Titus Lucretius Tricipitinus

Personal details
- Born: Unknown; Ancient Rome
- Died: c. 496 BC; Ancient Rome
- Children: Lucius Valerius Potitus (consul in 483 and 470 BC)

Marcus Valerius Volusus (or Volesus, sometimes referred to as M. Valerius Volusus Maximus) was a Roman consul with Publius Postumius Tubertus in 505 BC.

He was the son of a Volesus Valerius and brother to Publius Valerius Publicola (consul in 509, 508, 507, and 504 BC) and Manius Valerius Maximus (dictator in 494 BC).

During his consulship in 505 BC he successfully conducted war with the Sabines and both consuls were awarded triumphs. After his consulship he was sent in 501 BC as an ambassador to Ferentium to hinder a new war with the Latins.

In around 496 BC (alternative dating includes 499 BC, 493 BC and 489 BC) he was involved in the fight against the Latins (who were accompanied by Tarquinius Superbus and his son Titus Tarquinius) at the Battle of Lake Regillus. During the battle, Valerius charged Titus in an attempt to slay him, but was himself killed by Titus' men.

Some contradiction exists in the regards to his death at the Battle of Lake Regillus as in a few sources he is mentioned as being elected augur in 494 BC.

His son Lucius was consul in 483 BC and 470 BC. He might have had a second son, named Manius, who according to a dubious account by Festus was dictator in 501 BC and who could possibly be the augur mentioned as having died in 463 BC.

== Sources ==
- Livy, Ab urbe condita, 1:58, 2:16, 2:18-2:20.
- Plutarch, Parallel Lives: Poplicola.
- William Smith (lexicographer), Dictionary of Greek and Roman Biography and Mythology

Preceded by Spurius Larcius Rufus and Titus Herminius Aquilinus	Consul of the Roman Republic with Publius Postumius Tubertus; 505 BC	Succeeded by Publius Valerius Publicola and Titus Lucretius Tricipitinus
