= Titus Lucretius Tricipitinus =

Late 6th century BC Roman politician, consul and military leader

Consul of the Roman Republic
- In office 1 September 508 BC – 29 August 507 BC Serving with Publius Valerius Publicola
- Preceded by: Marcus Horatius Pulvillus, Publius Valerius Publicola
- Succeeded by: Publius Valerius Publicola, Marcus Horatius Pulvillus
- In office 1 September 504 BC – 29 August 503 BC Serving with Publius Valerius Publicola
- Preceded by: Marcus Valerius Volusus, Publius Postumius Tubertus
- Succeeded by: Agrippa Menenius Lanatus, Publius Postumius Tubertus

Personal details
- Born: Unknown; Ancient Rome
- Died: unknown Ancient Rome

Titus Lucretius Tricipitinus was a politician and military leader in the early days of the Roman Republic. Twice, in the years 508 and 504 BC, he was elected Roman Consul, alongside Publius Valerius Poplicola. Also a military leader, he was victorious against Lars Porsena during his first consulate. According to Livy, he led the Roman army together with Valerius against the Sabines in 504 BC and both consuls were awarded the honour of a triumph, however the Fasti Triumphales only mention the triumph of Valerius, in May 504 BC.

During the war between Rome and Clusium, Lucretius participated in a successful sally organised by Valerius, killing a Clusian raiding party.

The stories of Titus and his exploits may in part be mythical.

== See also ==
- Lucretia gens

Political offices
Preceded by Marcus Horatius Pulvillus (Suffect); Publius Valerius Poplicola (Suffect)	Consul of the Roman Republic with Publius Valerius Poplicola; 508 BC	Succeeded by Publius Valerius Poplicola; Marcus Horatius Pulvillus
Preceded by Marcus Valerius Volusus; Publius Postumius Tubertus	Consul of the Roman Republic with Publius Valerius Poplicola; 504 BC	Succeeded by Agrippa Menenius Lanatus; Publius Postumius Tubertus
