= Pons Sublicius =

Ancient Roman bridge in Rome

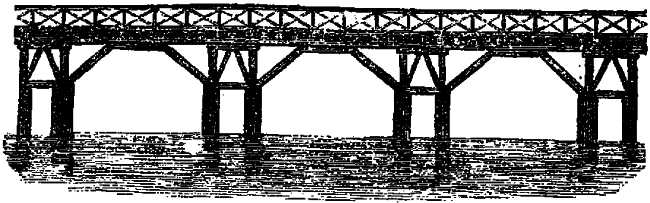
- The bridge as reconstructed by Luigi Canina (A Smaller History of Rome, 1881)

- Location within Rome
- Interactive map of Pons Sublicius
- 41°53′04″N 12°28′36″E
- Location: Rome

Site notes
- Material: Wood

The Pons Sublicius is the earliest known bridge of ancient Rome, spanning the Tiber River near the Forum Boarium ("cattle forum") downstream from the Tiber Island, near the foot of the Aventine Hill. According to tradition, its construction was ordered by Ancus Marcius around 642 BC, but this date is approximate because there is no ancient record of its construction. Marcius wished to connect the newly fortified Janiculum Hill on the Etruscan side to the rest of Rome, augmenting the ferry that was there. The bridge was part of public works projects that included building a port at Ostia, at the time the location of worked salt deposits.

== Construction ==
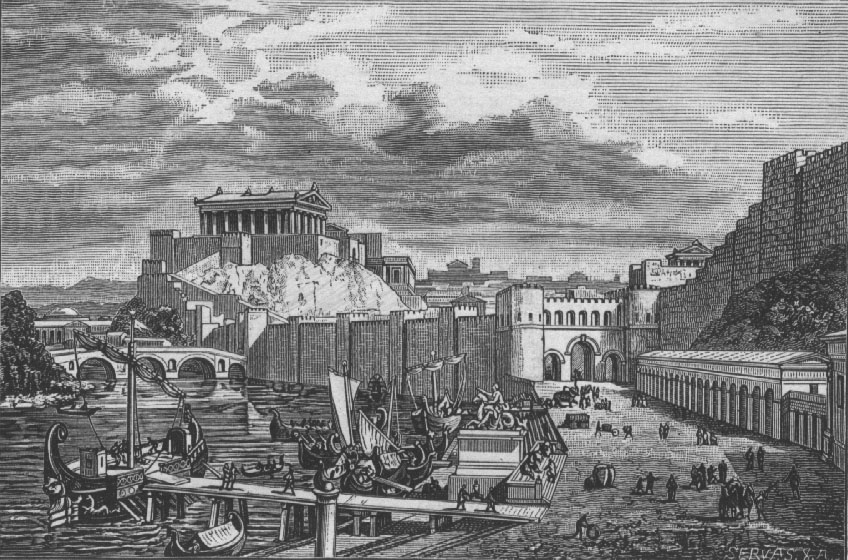
Drawing of the site of the Pons Sublicius (falsely shown as a pier), Illustration of Rome during the time of the Republic, from Friedrich Polack (1896)

Legend tells us that the bridge was made entirely of wood. The name comes from Latin pons, pontis, "bridge", and the adjective sublicius, "resting on pilings", from the stem of sublicae, pilings. As a sublica was a pick, sublicae implies pointed sticks; that is, the bridge was supported by pilings driven into the riverbed. Julius Caesar’s engineers used this construction to bridge the Rhine.

Legend tells us that the bridge was made entirely of wood. The name comes from Latin pons, pontis, "bridge", and the adjective sublicius, "resting on pilings", from the stem of sublicae, pilings. As a sublica was a pick, sublicae implies pointed sticks; that is, the bridge was supported by pilings driven into the riverbed. Julius Caesar’s engineers used this construction to bridge the Rhine.

The bridge was rebuilt repeatedly. The date of its final disappearance is not known, but it is not in classical times. The Via Latina went over the bridge and connected to the Via Cassia, a road built over an old Etruscan road that led to Veii. The bridge was a favorite resort for beggars, who used to sit upon it and demand alms, hence the Latin expression "aliquis de ponte" for a beggar.

The bridge was downstream from the Pons Aemilius, a good stone bridge with which it is sometimes confused. Between the two, the Cloaca Maxima, or Great Sewer, was effluent into the Tiber.

In the drawing by Friedrich Polack (published 1896) included with this article the pile bridge is falsely shown as a pile pier. Presumably some structure still existed prior to 1896, which was incorrectly identified. Otherwise the drawing appears to be accurate in the major details.

The observer is standing on the Via Ostiensis at the foot of the Aventine, which is at his back. The river flows toward him. The stone bridge in evidence is the Pons Aemilius. The Servian Wall goes along the bank of the river, is pierced by the Porta Trigemina (you can see the three openings) and starts up the Aventine. Beyond the gate is the Forum Boarium. In the immediate foreground are the docks, or Navalia.

The pier is highly unlikely, as any ship tied up at it as shown would be unstable in the full force of the current. Moreover, the masts would have to be shipped for passage under the bridges. One can readily see how unsuitable the river was for sea-going traffic and how necessary the port of Ostia would have been to Rome.

The opening of the Cloaca Maxima is between the docks and the stone bridge. Beyond the bridge you can just see the Aesculapium on Tiber Island. Looming over the whole scene is the Capitoline, with the temple of Jupiter Capitolinus upon it. The rising ground on the opposite side of the stone bridge is the Janiculum.

== Horatius Cocles at the bridge ==
The legend of Publius Horatius Cocles at the bridge appears in a number of classical authors, most notably in Livy.

After the overthrow of the Roman monarchy in 509 BC, the exile of the royal family and the king Lucius Tarquinius Superbus, and the establishment of the Roman Republic, Tarquinius sought military aid to regain the throne from the Etruscan king of Clusium, Lars Porsena. Porsena led his army against Rome in 508 BC. The battle went badly for the Romans, and the Etruscan army surged towards the bridge. The Romans initially fell back. However, Horatius, with the assistance of Spurius Larcius and Titus Herminius Aquilinus, sought to buy time and halt the attack by defending the opposite end of the bridge while the Roman soldiers broke the bridge.

In modern English literature, the story of Horatius at the bridge was re-told by Thomas Babington Macaulay in his poem Horatius, published as part of his Lays of Ancient Rome (1842).

== Gaius Gracchus at the bridge ==
The Pons Sublicius is also the bridge over which Gaius Gracchus directed his flight when he was overtaken by his opponents (Plutarch, Life of Gaius Gracchus). Two of his friends attempted to stop them at the bridge, but were themselves killed. Gracchus died violently shortly after in a grove nearby. Roman citizens cheered on the flight of Gracchus but would not assist him. Gracchus' choice of an escape route was probably intended to make use of the magical powers attributed to the bridge, but it failed.

== Ritual of the Argei ==
On the Ides of May, the procession of the Argei went from the temple of Fors Fortuna, built by Servius Tullius, to the Pons Sublicius. (There is no reference for this version of events; this ritual is somewhat unclear and may be the same as the Roman Liberalia.) Alternately, Samuel Ball Platner explains that the ritual involved priests travelling to all (27 or 30) of the shrines (sacella) called Argei in the original 4 regions of Rome before arriving at the Pons Sublicius. The pontiffs and the magistrates were carrying straw effigies of bound men, also called Argei, which the Vestals threw into the Tiber. The Flaminica Dialis was dressed in mourning.

The ceremony has sometimes been interpreted as an Etruscan magical military tactic, comparable to another in which a Gallic man and woman were buried alive in the Forum Boarium. The Greeks and the Gauls were being ritually buried or drowned, which the superstitious Romans believed had a real effect on their Greek or Gallic enemies. They carried out this type of sacrifice also after major defeats.

== New developments ==
The publication Papers of the British School at Rome, volume 72, 2004, contains an article by Pier Luigi Tucci, "Eight Fragments of the Marble Plan of Rome Shedding New Light on the Transtiberim", where he claims that fragments 138a–f and 574a–b of the Forma Urbis, a marble plan of Rome from the time of Septimius Severus, show the right bank of the Tiber, opposite the Aventine. A road appears there, formerly thought to cross the Pons Aemilius, but shown on the forma crossing another bridge, the last remains of which were removed in the late nineteenth century. This bridge is thought to have been the pons Sublicius. For an update, see Pier Luigi Tucci, ‘The Pons Sublicius: a reinvestigation,’ Memoirs of the American Academy in Rome, volume 56-57 (2011–2012), pp. 177–212

== See also ==
- Roman bridge
- List of Roman bridges
- Ponte Sublicio, the modern bridge in a similar location
