= Foedus Cassianum =

Treaty allying the Roman Republic and the Latin League (493 BC)

The Foedus Cassianum (/ˈfiːdəs ˌkæʃiˈeɪnəm/ in English) or the Treaty of Cassius was, according to Roman tradition, a treaty which was made between the Roman Republic and the Latin League in 493 BC after the Battle of Lake Regillus. It ended the war between the Latin League and Rome, placing Rome as equal in power to all of the members of the League combined.

The treaty was significant in serving as a model for later treaties between Rome and other Italic polities, which evolved into the large system of protectorates which became known as socii.

== Background ==
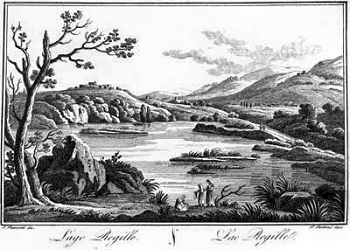
An engraving of Lake Regillus

In their first treaty with Carthage, the Romans listed the surrounding countryside as part of its territory, which the Latin League contested, claiming that the said territory actually belonged to them. A war followed, with the result of a victory for the Romans at the Battle of Lake Regillus and conditional surrender soon after.

The treaty was concluded in 493 between Rome and thirty Latin cities as two independent powers. The foedus took its name from Spurius Cassius Vecellinus, who was a consul of the Roman Republic at the time the treaty was signed, and ratified the treaty in Rome on Rome's behalf.

== Terms ==
The treaty laid out several terms. Not only did it stipulate that there would be peace between the two parties, the treaty mandated that the Roman and Latin armies would be joined to provide mutual defence from Italic tribes. Another term was that the Latin League and Rome would split all spoils taken in war. Also, the two parties agreed to set up joint colonies in captured territory so that they both might prosper. Finally, it established a community of private rights between citizens of Rome and any Latin city. The treaty, of which a bronze copy survived in the Roman Forum until Cicero's day, was a landmark in the early history of Rome. The original does not survive. A version given by Dionysius of Halicarnassus is

Let there be peace among the Romans and all the Latin cities as long as the heavens and the earth shall remain where they are. Let them neither make war upon one another themselves, nor bring in foreign enemies nor grant a safe passage to those who shall make war upon either. Let them assist one another when warred upon, with all their forces, and let each have an equal share of the spoils and booty taken in their common wars. Let suits relating to private contracts be determined within ten days, and in the nation where the contract was made. And let it not be permitted to add anything to, or take anything away from these treaties except by consent both of the Romans and of all the Latins.

Dionysius' version mentions a mutual defense pact between the Romans and Latins, but omits any mention of a joint command structure or any provision for mutual consultation. A few fragmentary sentences from L. Cincius (as quoted by Festus) indicated that the Latins would meet at the spring of Ferentina to discuss the issue of command. In addition, he describes the process followed "in a year when it was the responsibility of the Romans to supply a commander for the army by order of the Latin name". The passage is somewhat vague, and seems to imply that command of the army would alternate in years between the Latins and the Romans. However, this appears to have never occurred, and so the most probable explanation is that a Roman commander was summoned only in years when a campaign actually took place.

== Expansion of treaty ==
In 486 BC, Rome (again through the efforts of Spurius Cassius Vecellinus) entered into a treaty with the Hernici. The terms were apparently similar to the Foedus Cassianum, and there is a suggestion (though not certain) that the Hernici may have been admitted as a party to the actual Foedus Cassianum between Rome and the Latin allies.

The treaty was later regarded as the beginning of the network of socii, Roman protectorates which went on to be a major factor in the Republic's development and rise.

== Effects ==
The treaty strengthened Rome greatly, as it essentially added the military power of the Latins to the army of the fledgling Roman Republic. This allowed Rome to expand further, conquering much of the Italian Peninsula. The treaty was renewed in 358 BC. However, Rome reneged on the treaty soon after that, and the Latin War began. Rome eventually overcame the non-Roman members of the league, and the Foedus Cassianum was rendered void.

== See also ==
- Latium
- Latin War
