= Titus Herminius Aquilinus =

Roman military general and consul (died 498/496 BC)

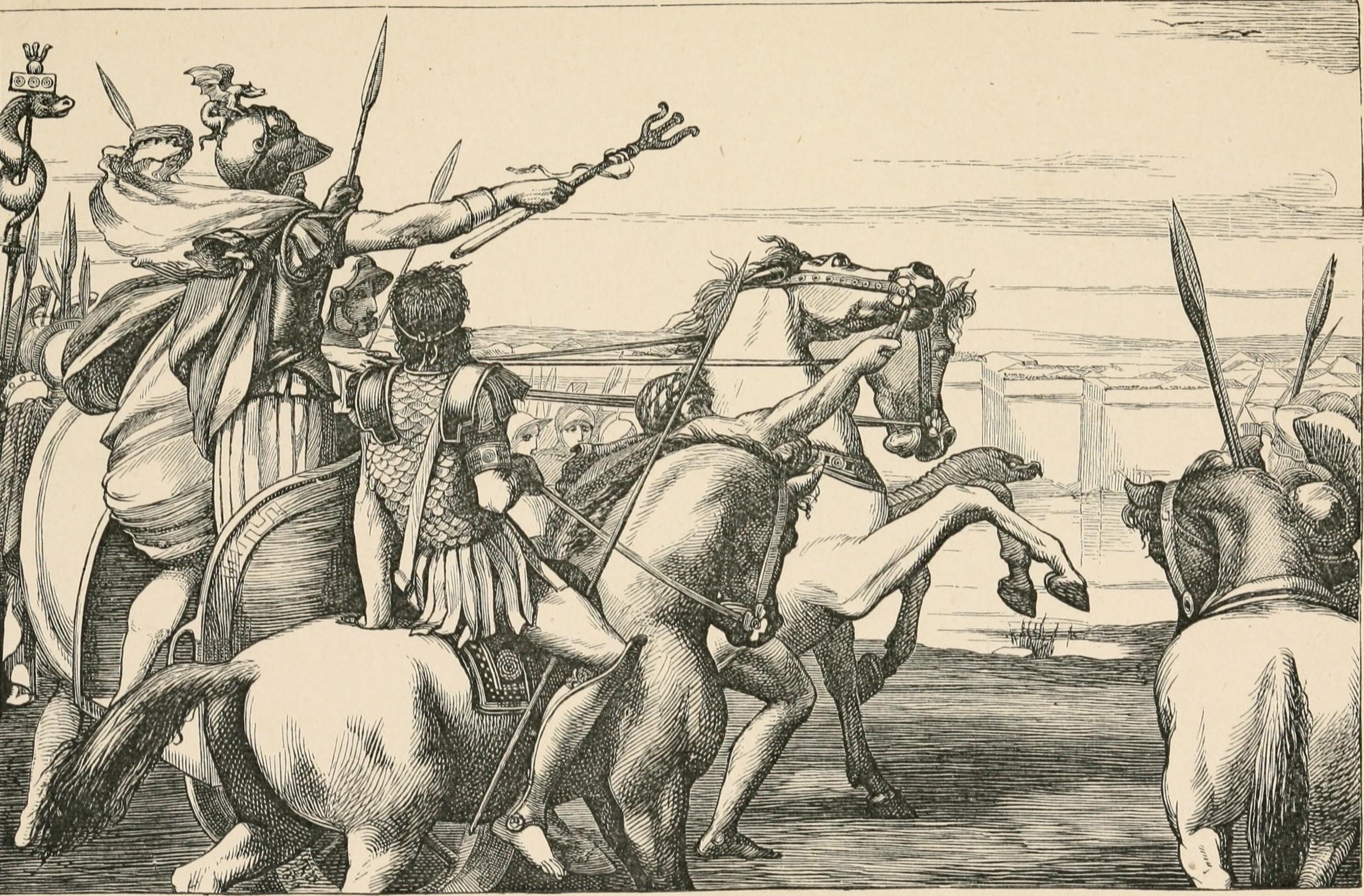
- Lars Porsena (in chariot), flanked by Octavius Mamilius, surveys Rome before the Battle of the Sublician Bridge (508 BC), at which Herminius won everlasting fame. Herminius would slay Mamilius at the Battle of Lake Regillus (498/496 BC). Illustration by John Reinhard Weguelin for Macaulay's Lays of Ancient Rome.

Consul of the Roman Republic
- In office 506 BC – 505 BC Serving with Spurius Larcius
- Preceded by: Publius Valerius Publicola, Marcus Horatius Pulvillus
- Succeeded by: Marcus Valerius Volusus, Publius Postumius Tubertus

Personal details
- Born: Unknown Ancient Rome
- Died: 498 BC Ancient Rome

Titus Herminius, surnamed Aquilinus (died c. 498 BC), was one of the heroes of the Roman Republic. He participated in two of the most famous conflicts that attended the birth of the Republic, and was elected consul in 506 BC. However, his greatest fame was won as one of the defenders of the Sublician bridge against the army of Lars Porsena, the King of Clusium.

== Background ==
The Herminii were a patrician family at Rome during the early years of the Republic. The Romans themselves regarded the family as Etruscan, and they were one of the few Roman gentes to use distinctly Etruscan praenomina; Lars Herminius held the consulship in 448 BC. However, in the legend of the Sublician bridge, Titus Herminius may have represented the Sabine element of the Roman people.

== War with Clusium ==
Following the expulsion of the king Lucius Tarquinius Superbus from Rome in 509 BC, Lars Porsena, the King of Clusium, resolved to conquer Rome, either to restore the Etruscan monarchy, or possibly for himself. The following year he went to war with Rome, and advanced with his army upon the city. After successfully capturing those parts of the city on the Etruscan side of the Tiber, including the Janiculum, the Clusian army approached the Pons Sublicius, a wooden bridge leading into the city proper. The Roman forces withdrew to the eastern side of the river, as engineers began the work of destroying the bridge's supports. Three Romans remained on the bridge to fend off the Etruscans: Publius Horatius Cocles, Spurius Larcius, and Herminius.

Niebuhr suggests a symbolic importance to these three men: each represented one of the three ancient tribes making up the Roman populace: the Ramnes, or Latins, represented by Horatius; the Titienses, or Sabines, represented by Herminius, and the Luceres, or Etruscans, represented by Lartius.

The bridge was too narrow for more than a few of the approaching army to advance upon its defenders at once, and according to the legend, they held their ground until the bridge was about to collapse. Horatius then urged his colleagues to retreat to safety, leaving him alone on the bridge. There he remained, fighting off one attacker after another, until the bridge at last gave way and plunged into the river. Horatius then jumped into the river. Accounts vary as to whether Horatius survived and swam to shore, or was drowned in the Tiber; in most accounts he survived, but according to Polybius, he defended the bridge alone, and perished in the river.

Lartius and Herminius appear again in the war with Clusium, commanding troops as part of a trap devised by the consul Publius Valerius Publicola to capture Etruscan raiding parties.

== Consulship ==
Herminius was elected consul in 506 BC, the fourth year of the Republic, with Spurius Lartius, his companion on the bridge, as his colleague. No significant events occurred during their year of office, and Niebuhr suggests that their names may have been inserted in the consular fasti to fill the gap of one year (perhaps due to Lars Porsena holding the city). Their successors sent a delegation to meet with the envoys of Porsena, and established a treaty, by which the Etruscan King gave up his claims to Rome.

== Battle of Lake Regillus ==
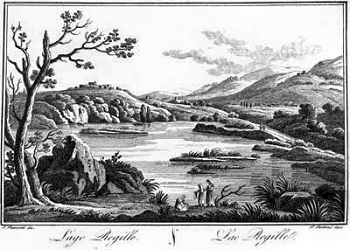
Lake Regillus, where Herminius slew Octavius Mamilius, and was slain in turn.

In 498 BC, or in some accounts 496, war erupted between Rome and the Latins. Many of the Latin towns had been allies of Rome during the final days of the Roman monarchy; some continued this alliance, while others sided with the Tarquins, who sought to regain the throne. The Latin league was led by Octavius Mamilius, a prince of Tusculum, and the son-in-law of Lucius Tarquinius Superbus, the seventh and last King of Rome. To meet the Latin army, the Romans appointed a dictator, Aulus Postumius Albus, and his magister equitum, Titus Aebutius Elva. Herminius was a general officer in the Roman expeditionary force, which encountered the army near Lake Regillus.

During the course of the battle, Aebutius, the magister equitum, spotted Mamilius and engaged him on horseback. The two men met with great fury, and each suffered serious injuries. Aebutius was forced to retire from the battle, and direct his cavalry from a distance, while Mamilius was taken to the rear. The Latin commander returned to the fray in order to save a company of Roman exiles, who were about to be cut off by Postumius, and in so doing he was recognized by Herminius.

In the ensuing charge, described by the historian Livy as occurring with even greater ferocity than the clash with Aebutius, Herminius killed the Latin dictator with a single thrust through the body. He then stooped to strip the armour from the fallen prince, but was mortally wounded by a javelin. He was carried living to the rear, but he died as his wounds were being dressed.

== In literature ==
The stand of Herminius and his companions against Lars Porsena at the Sublician Bridge in 508 BC is celebrated in Macaulay's Lays of Ancient Rome, the most famous of which is Horatius.

== See also ==
- Herminia gens

== Footnotes ==
Political offices
| Preceded by Publius Valerius Poplicola and Marcus Horatius Pulvillus | Roman consul with Spurius Larcius; 506 BC | Succeeded by Marcus Valerius Volusus and Publius Postumius Tubertus |
