= Spurius Cassius Vecellinus =

Roman consul, magister equitum and legislator (died 485 BC)

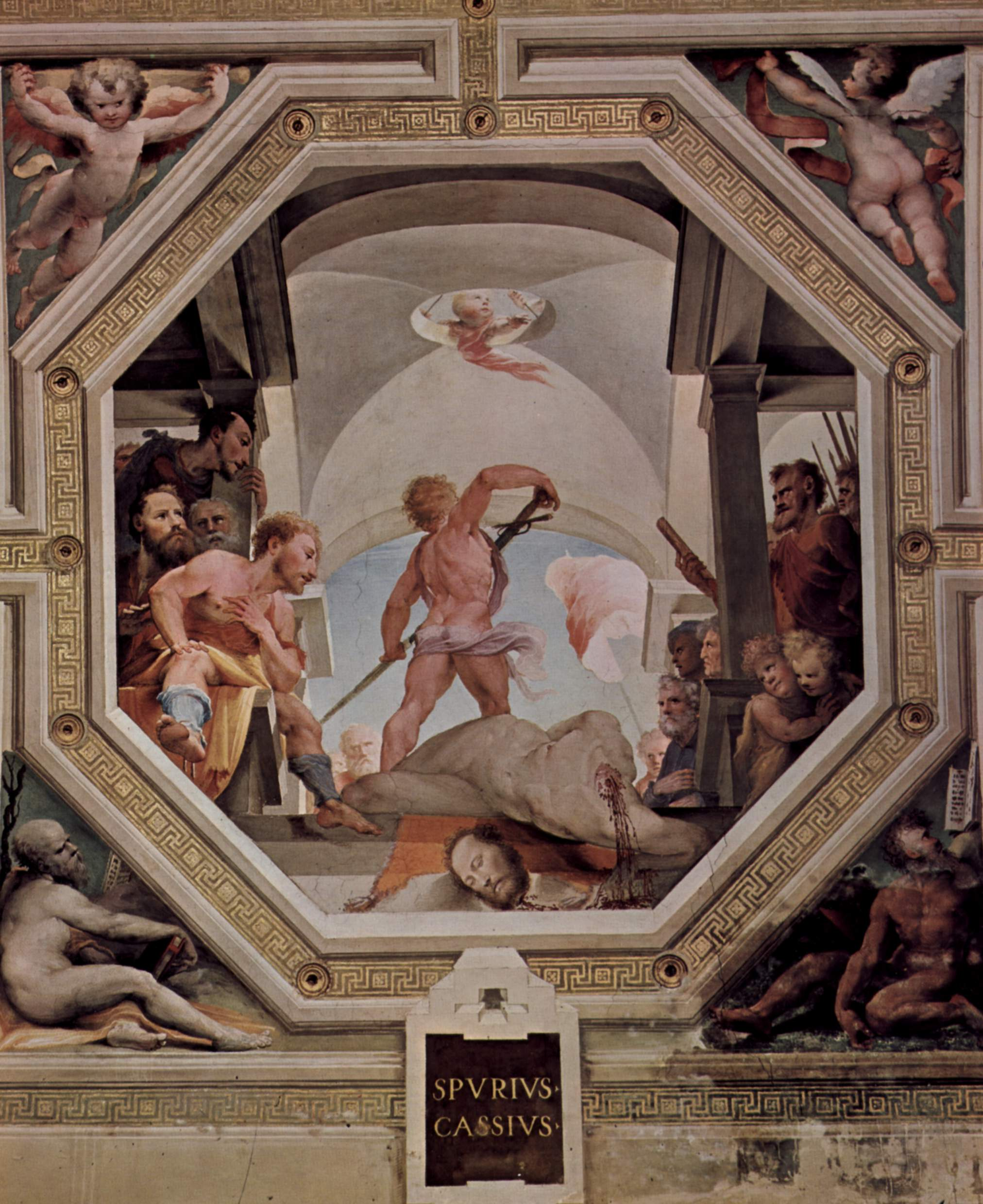
The Execution of Spurius Vecellinus, by Domenico Beccafumi, fresco in the Palazzo Pubblico.

Spurius Cassius Vecellinus or Vicellinus (died 485 BC) was one of the most distinguished men of the early Roman Republic. He was three times consul, and celebrated two triumphs. He was the first magister equitum, and the author of the first agrarian law. The year following his last consulship, he was accused of aiming at regal power, and was put to death by the patricians.

== Background ==
His surname variously appears as Vecellinus, Vicellinus, and Viscellinus. The last has been shown to be incorrect, and Vecellinus is usually preferred. The otherwise unattested name may be a reference to a Mount Vecilius mentioned by Livy.

According to one tradition, Cassius' father was still living and hale at the time of his death. If this were the case, it would be difficult to place Cassius' birth much earlier than 540 or 535 BC. Cassius also left behind him three sons, whose names have not been preserved. It is believed that the original Cassii were patricians, although the later members of the gens occurring in history were all plebeian. The historian Niebuhr suggests that Cassius' sons may have been expelled by the patricians from their order, or that they or their descendants may have voluntarily passed over to the plebeians, because the patricians had shed the blood of their father.

== Magistracies ==
Cassius' first consulship was in 502 BC, the eighth year of the Republic. His colleague was Opiter Verginius Tricostus. Dionysius reports that Cassius carried on war against the Sabines, whom he defeated (with great loss to the Sabines) near Cures. The Sabines sued for peace, and surrendered a large portion of their land. On his return to Rome, Cassius celebrated his first triumph, which is confirmed by the Fasti Triumphales. Livy, however, states that the two consuls carried on war against the Aurunci, and took the town of Suessa Pometia. The same events he reports under 495 BC, which is in agreement with Dionysius. Thus, Dionysius probably preserves the correct account.

In the following year, Titus Larcius was appointed the first dictator, and as his magister equitum he nominated Cassius. The reason for the institution of these offices was the fear of impending war with both the Sabines and the Latins. After a failed round of negotiations, war was declared against the Sabines, but as both sides were reluctant to come to blows, no hostilities ensued. War with the Latins came in 498 BC, with the Battle of Lake Regillus. Following the Roman victory, Cassius is said to have urged the senate to destroy the Latin towns.

Cassius was consul for the second time in 493 BC, with Postumus Cominius Auruncus. The consuls entered upon their office during the secession of the plebs to the Mons Sacer. The strife between the patricians and plebeians was a recurring theme throughout the early history of the Republic, and in time cost Cassius his life. In contrast with his former position, Cassius ratified a treaty with the Latins on Rome's behalf, thereby removing one source of danger to the fledgling Republic. The treaty became known as the Foedus Cassianum, bearing the consul's name. Cicero related that a copy of the treaty was still extant in his day, and its terms are summarized by Dionysius. Later the same year, Cassius consecrated the temple of Ceres, Bacchus, and Proserpina.

In 486 BC, Cassius was consul for the third time, with Proculus Verginius Tricostus Rutilus. Cassius marched against the Volsci and Hernici, but they sued for peace, and once again showing his talent for diplomacy, Cassius formed a league with the Hernici. Livius states that the Hernici agreed to surrender two thirds of their land, but a more likely explanation is that the Romans, Latins, and Hernici agreed to share their acquired land evenly, with each receiving one third of the lands conquered by their mutual arms. This treaty, resembling one formerly in force under the kings, held for over a hundred years. On his return, Cassius celebrated his second triumph.

== Trial and execution ==
After concluding the treaty with the Hernici, Cassius proposed the first agrarian law at Rome, arguing for the land to be distributed amongst the plebs and the Latin allies. Cassius' colleague, Verginius, and the patricians strongly opposed the law. Debate and discord ensued, and the plebs turned against Cassius, suspecting him of aiming at regal power.

In 485 BC once Cassius had left office he was condemned and executed. Livy says that the method of his trial is uncertain. Livy's preferred version is that a public trial on the charge of high treason was held on the orders of the quaestores parricidii Caeso Fabius and Lucius Valerius, at which Cassius was condemned by the people, and subsequently by public decree his house was demolished (being near the temple of Tellus). The alternative version is that Cassius' own father conducted a private trial (presumably exercising authority as pater familias) and put his son to death, and subsequently dedicated his son's assets to the goddess Ceres, including by dedicating a statue to her with the inscription "given from the Cassian family".

Dionysius states that he was hurled from the Tarpeian Rock.

Niebuhr argues that it was impossible that a man who had been thrice consul and twice triumphed should still be in his father's power.

Cassius Dio expressed his belief in the consul's innocence.

The statue of Cassius erected at the Temple of Tellus was melted down by the censors. Some seem to have called for the execution of Cassius' sons also, but according to Dionysius, they were spared by the senate. The destruction of statues made in honor of Cassius, as recorded by Pliny the Elder, are the earliest known examples of honorific monuments being destroyed by Romans in accordance with damnatio memoriae. However, the chronology of Pliny's record is disputed as commemorative portraiture was not present in Rome at the time and the Temple of Tellus was not dedicated until 268 BC.

== Chronological uncertainty ==
E.J. Bickerman has suggested that Cassius' third consulship occurred in 480 BC, the same year as the Battle of Salamis. However, this assertion rests on the accuracy of Diodorus Siculus, who stated that his consulship coincided with the archonship of Calliades in Athens. Calliades was archon in 480 BC. Herodotus confirms the possibility that the battles of Thermopylae and Salamis were fought shortly after the Olympic Games of that year, and only a few months after these events: "On approach of spring, the sun suddenly quit his seat in the heavens, and disappeared" when Xerxes left Sardis, a few weeks or months before crossing over to Greece. This eclipse occurred on February 17, 478 BC, providing a valuable chronological reference.

== See also ==
- Cassia gens

== Works cited ==
- Varner, Eric (2004). Mutilation and Transformation: Damnatio Memoriae and Roman Imperial Portraiture. Brill Publishers. ISBN 978-90-47-40470-5.

Political offices
Preceded by Agrippa Menenius Lanatus; Publius Postumius Tubertus II	Roman consul 502 BC; With: Opiter Verginius Tricostus	Succeeded by Postumius Cominius Auruncus; Titus Larcius
Preceded by Aulus Verginius Tricostus Caeliomontanus; Titus Veturius Geminus Cicurinus	Roman consul II; 493 BC; With: Postumius Cominius Auruncus II	Succeeded by Titus Geganius Macerinus; Publius Minucius Augurinus
Preceded by Titus Sicinius Sabinus; Gaius Aquillius Tuscus	Roman consul III; 486 BC; With: Proculus Verginius Tricostus Rutilus	Succeeded by Servius Cornelius Maluginensis; Quintus Fabius Vibulanus
