= Spurius Larcius =

6th/5th-century BC Roman senator and general

- Years active: c. 509–482 BC
- Office: Consul (506, 490 BC)
- Relatives: Titus Larcius (brother)

Spurius Larcius (surnamed Flavus or Rufus; fl. c. 509–482 BC) was one of the leading men of the early Roman Republic, of which he was twice consul. However, his greatest fame was won as one of the defenders of the Sublician bridge against the army of Lars Porsena, the King of Clusium.

== Background ==
The Larcii, whose nomen is also given as Lartius and Largius, (Note: This nomen is derived from the Etruscan praenomen Lars.) were an Etruscan family at Rome during the early years of the Republic. Spurius' brother, Titus Larcius, was twice consul, in 501 and 498 BC, and was also nominated dictator. Dionysius gives their surname as Flavus, but in some sources it is Rufus. Both were common surnames, originally referring to someone with fair or red hair, respectively, and it may be that the two brothers were distinguished by their surnames as well as by their praenomina.

== War with Clusium ==
Following the expulsion of Lucius Tarquinius Superbus, the last Roman king in 509 BC, Lars Porsena, the King of Clusium, resolved to conquer Rome, either to restore the Etruscan monarchy, or possibly for himself. The following year he went to war with Rome, and advanced with his army upon the city. After occupying the Janiculum on the west side of the Tiber, the Clusian army approached the Pons Sublicius, a wooden bridge leading into the city. The Roman forces withdrew to the eastern side of the river, as engineers began the work of destroying the bridge's supports. Three Romans remained on the bridge to fend off the Etruscans: Publius Horatius Cocles, Titus Herminius Aquilinus, and Spurius Larcius.

Niebuhr suggests a symbolic importance to these three men: each represented one of the three ancient tribes making up the Roman populace: the Ramnes, or Latins, represented by Horatius; the Titienses, or Sabines, represented by Herminius, and the Luceres, or Etruscans, represented by Larcius.

The bridge was too narrow for more than a few of the approaching army to advance upon its defenders at once, and according to the legend, they held their ground until the bridge was about to collapse. Horatius then urged his colleagues to retreat to safety, leaving him alone on the bridge. There he remained, fighting off one attacker after another, until the bridge at last gave way and plunged into the river. Horatius then jumped into the river. Accounts vary as to whether Horatius survived and swam to shore, or was drowned in the Tiber; in most accounts he survived, but according to Polybius, he defended the bridge alone, and perished in the river.

Larcius and Herminius appear again in the war with Clusium, commanding troops as part of a trap devised by the consul Publius Valerius Publicola to capture Etruscan raiding parties.

== Career ==
Larcius was elected consul for 506 BC, the fourth year of the Republic, with Titus Herminius, his companion on the bridge, as his colleague. (Note: There is some confusion in Livy as to the consuls of 507 and 506. Niebuhr suggests that Larcius and Herminius may have been inserted in the consular fasti to fill the gap of one year, perhaps due to Lars Porsena holding the city, but more recent scholarship suggests that they were originally named in Livy.) No significant events occurred during their year of office. Their successors sent a delegation to meet with the envoys of Porsena, and established a treaty, by which the Etruscan King gave up his claims to Rome. Larcius served as legate under the consul Publius Postumius Tubertus against the Sabines in 505, and either he or his brother, Titus, was lieutenant to the consul Publius Valerius Poplicola in 504.

Larcius was consul for the second time in 490 BC, with Quintus Sulpicius Camerinus Cornutus. In 488, he and Sulpicius were among five consulares (Note: The others were Marcus Minucius Augurinus, consul in 497 and 491, Postumus Cominius Auruncus, consul in 501 and 493, and Publius Pinarius Mamercinus Rufus, consul in 489.) sent to treat with Gaius Marcius Coriolanus as he advanced upon Rome. In the following year, Larcius was praefectus urbi, or warden of the city. In 482, he was the second of two interreges appointed by the senate to hold the consular elections. Larcius finished holding the comitia that his predecessor, Aulus Sempronius Atratinus, had begun; Sempronius had been unable to finish the elections as the office of interrex was limited to a span of five days. The same year, Larcius advised going to war with the nearby Etruscan city of Veii.

== In literature ==
The stand of Larcius and his companions against Lars Porsena at the Sublician Bridge in 508 BC is celebrated in Macaulay's Lays of Ancient Rome, the most famous of which is Horatius.

== See also ==
- Lartia gens

== Bibliography ==
- Polybius, Historiae (The Histories).
- Dionysius of Halicarnassus, Romaike Archaiologia (Roman Antiquities).
- Titus Livius (Livy), History of Rome.
- Valerius Maximus, Factorum ac Dictorum Memorabilium (Memorable Facts and Sayings).
- Lucius Mestrius Plutarchus (Plutarch), Lives of the Noble Greeks and Romans.
- Chronography of 354.
- Thomas Babington Macaulay, Lays of Ancient Rome, Longman, London (1842).
- Dictionary of Greek and Roman Biography and Mythology, William Smith, ed., Little, Brown and Company, Boston (1849).
- George Davis Chase, "The Origin of Roman Praenomina", in Harvard Studies in Classical Philology, vol. VIII, pp. 103–184 (1897).
- T. Robert S. Broughton, The Magistrates of the Roman Republic, American Philological Association (1952–1986).
- Robert Maxwell Ogilvie, Commentary on Livy, books 1–5, Clarendon Press, Oxford (1965).

Political offices
Preceded by Publius Valerius Poplicola; Marcus Horatius Pulvillus	Roman consul 506 BC; With: Titus Herminius Aquilinus	Succeeded by Marcus Valerius Volusus; Publius Postumius Tubertus
Preceded by Marcus Minucius Augurinus; Aulus Sempronius Atratinus	Roman consul II; 490 BC; With: Quintus Sulpicius Camerinus Cornutus	Succeeded by Gaius Julius Iullus; Publius Pinarius Mamercinus Rufus
