= Latin League =

Ancient Italian confederation for mutual defense

- 793 BC–338 BC
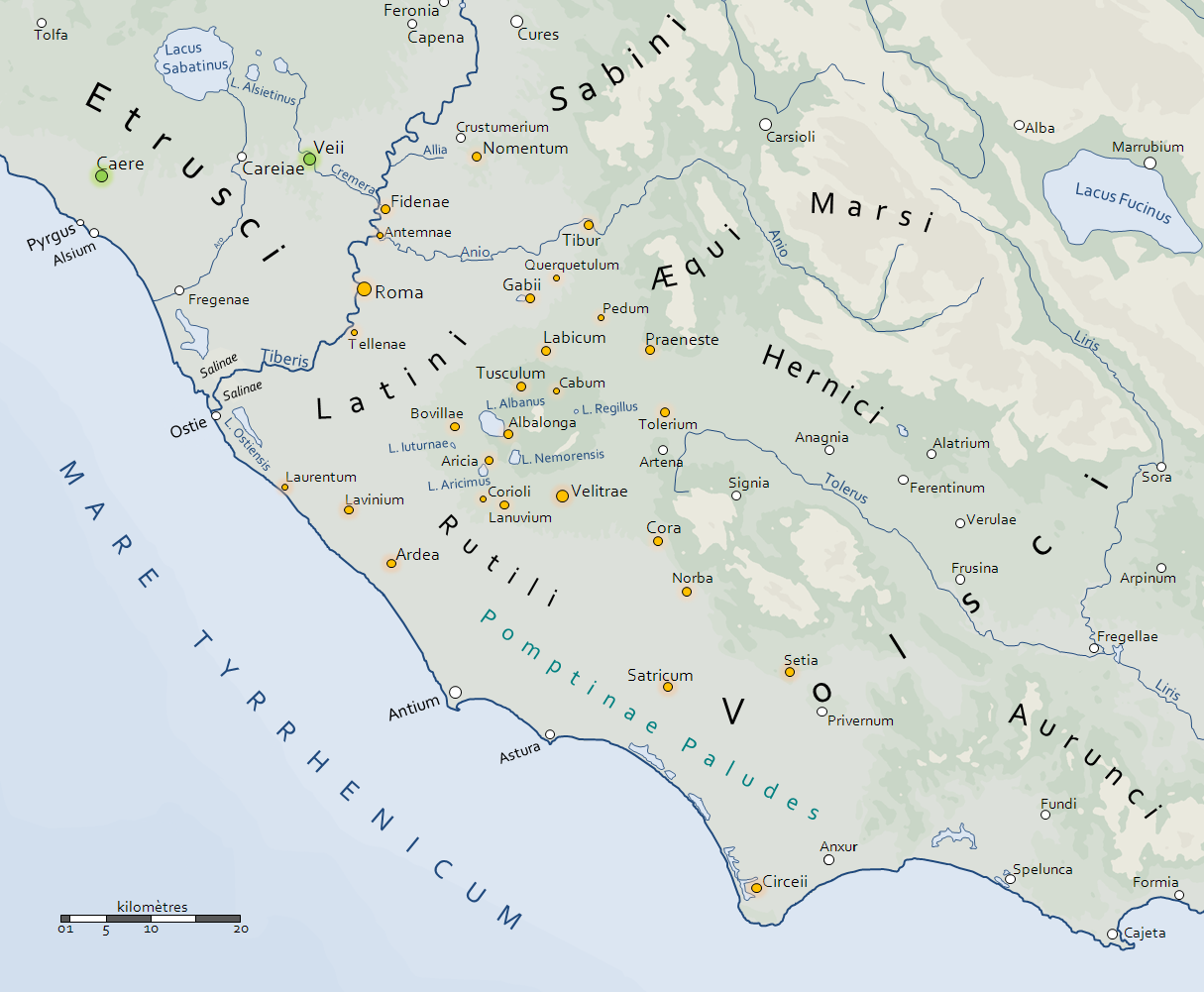
- Map of the main cities of the Latin League
- Common languages: Latin
- Government: Tribal Confederation
- History
  - Established: 793 BC
  - Disestablished: 338 BC
| Preceded by | Succeeded by |
| Latins; Alba Longa | Roman Republic |
- Today part of: Italy

The Latin League (c. 8th century – 338 BC) was an ancient confederation of about 30 city-state and small settlements in the region of Latium near the ancient city of Rome, organized for mutual defense by the Italic people of the Latins. The term "Latin League" is one coined by modern historians with no precise Latin equivalent.

== Creation ==
The Latin League was created for protection against enemies from surrounding areas (the Etruscans) under the leadership of the city of Alba Longa. An incomplete fragment of an inscription recorded by Cato the Elder claims that at one time the league included Tusculum, Aricia, Lanuvium, Lavinium, Cora, Tibur, Pometia and Ardea.

== Roman leadership of the League ==
During the reign of Tarquinius Superbus, the Latins were persuaded to acknowledge the leadership of Rome. The treaty with Rome was renewed, and it was agreed that the troops of the Latins would attend on an appointed day to form a united military force with the troops of Rome. That was done, and Tarquin formed combined units of Roman and Latin troops.

The early Roman Republic allied with the Latin League in 493 BC. According to Roman tradition, the treaty, the Foedus Cassianum, followed a Roman victory over the league in the Battle of Lake Regillus. It provided that both Rome and the Latin League would share loot from military conquests (which would later be one of the reasons for the Latin War 341–338 BC) and that any military campaigns between the two would be led by Roman generals. The alliance helped repel attacks from such peoples as the Aequi and the Volsci, tribes of the Apennine Mountains, who were prevented from invading Latium by the blending of armies.

It is still unclear if the Latins had accepted Rome as a member of the League, or if the treaty had been signed as between Rome and the Latin League.

== Wars with Rome ==
During the Roman Kingdom and the early-to-mid Roman Republic there were numerous disputes between Rome and the Latins, which led to several wars between Rome and individual Latin cities and occasionally with the entire league.

The increasing power of Rome gradually led to its domination of the league. The renewal of the original treaty in 358 BC formally established Roman leadership and eventually triggered the outbreak of the Latin War (343–338 BC). Following the Roman victory, the league was dissolved.

After 338 BC, once the Latin league ceased, Rome renamed the cities municipia and established coloniae inside them. This meant that the towns were now ruled by Rome and that the people living there were considered Roman colonists.
