= Cori, Lazio =

Cori
- Comune
- Città di Cori
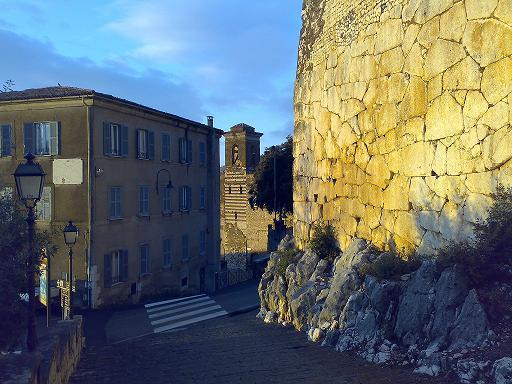
- View of Cori, Lazio

- Coat of arms

- location of Cori in the Province of Latina

- Location within Lazio Location within Italy Location within European Union
- Coordinates: 41°39′N 12°55′E
- Country: Italy
- Region: Lazio
- Province: Latina (LT)
- Frazioni: Giulianello

Government
  - Mayor: Mauro Primio De Lillis (Democratic Party)

Area
  - Total: 86 km^{2} (33 sq mi)
- Elevation: 384 m (1,260 ft)

Population (28 February 2017)
  - Total: 10,978
  - Density: 130/km^{2} (330/sq mi)
- Demonym: Coresi
- Time zone: UTC+1 (CET)
  - Summer (DST): UTC+2 (CEST)
- Postal code: 04010
- Dialing code: 06
- Patron saint: Madonna del Soccorso
- Saint day: Second Sunday in May
- Website: Official website

Cori (ancient Cora) is a city and comune in the province of Latina, in the Lazio region of central Italy.

== History ==
Cora was well developed in the age of the expansion of Rome (7th-6th century BC). It is recorded as being part of the Latin League. According to Livy, in 503 BC it sought unsuccessfully to revolt against the Roman Republic, together with Suessa Pometia, and with the assistance of the Aurunci. By 495 BC Cora and Pometia are said by Livy to have been Volscian towns. Upon hearing of Volscian attempts to foment war, the Roman army marched against the Volsci, and in order to avoid war the Volsci offered three hundred children of the leading men of Cora and Suessa Pometia as hostages. War nevertheless broke out later in the year. It is unclear what happened to the hostages.

Coins of Cora exist, belonging at latest to 350–250 BC. Cora became a Roman possession after the Social War (90–88 BC), maintaining some administrative and political autonomy, and before the end of the Republic it had become a municipium.

Cori suffered a steep decline in the early centuries of the Middle Ages. It was often allied with its neighbour Velletri. It was a possession of the Annibaldi until 1234, when it went back to the Papal suzerainty, under which (apart from a short period under Ladislaus of Naples in 1400–10) it remained until the unification of Italy.

It has been part of the province of Latina since 1934.

== Climate ==
Cori has a Mediterranean climate (Köppen climate classification Csa) with mild winters and hot summers.

Climate data for Cori
| Month | Jan | Feb | Mar | Apr | May | Jun | Jul | Aug | Sep | Oct | Nov | Dec | Year |
|---|---|---|---|---|---|---|---|---|---|---|---|---|---|
| Mean daily maximum °C (°F) | 13.4 (56.1) | 14.2 (57.6) | 17.1 (62.8) | 20.9 (69.6) | 25.1 (77.2) | 30.1 (86.2) | 33.0 (91.4) | 32.7 (90.9) | 27.3 (81.1) | 23.1 (73.6) | 18.0 (64.4) | 15.2 (59.4) | 22.5 (72.5) |
| Mean daily minimum °C (°F) | 3.2 (37.8) | 3.5 (38.3) | 7.2 (45.0) | 10.3 (50.5) | 14.8 (58.6) | 17.1 (62.8) | 19.1 (66.4) | 19.3 (66.7) | 16.9 (62.4) | 12.1 (53.8) | 7.7 (45.9) | 4.4 (39.9) | 11.3 (52.3) |
| Average precipitation mm (inches) | 76.7 (3.02) | 72.1 (2.84) | 64.3 (2.53) | 93.6 (3.69) | 20.9 (0.82) | 7.4 (0.29) | 4.6 (0.18) | 6.8 (0.27) | 21.1 (0.83) | 77.9 (3.07) | 89.0 (3.50) | 87.3 (3.44) | 621.7 (24.48) |
Source: Weatherbase

== Cori DOC ==
The hilly region of Cori is permitted to produce both red and white Italian DOC wine, with the region producing more white wines. Grapes are limited to a harvest yield of 16 tonnes/ha with finished white wines needing a minimum alcohol level of 11% and finished reds needing 11.5%. The white wines are a blend of up to 70% Malvasia di Candia, up to 40% Trebbiano and up to 30% Bellone and Giallo. The reds are composed of 40-60% Montepulciano and 20-40% Nero Buono, 10-30% Cesanese.

== Main sights ==
- The Temple of Hercules, early 1st century BC. It is a national monument of Italy.
- Sanctuary of Madonna del Soccorso.
- Santa Maria della Pietà, originally in Romanesque style, rebuilt in the 17th century
- Church of St. Francis (1521–26).
- Church of Santa Oliva, built in 1467–85 over a Roman temple dedicated to Janus. In the apse is a fresco of Pinturicchio's school. Annexed is a cloister from 1480. Nearby are the remains of the Temple of Castor and Pollux (a 1st-century BC restoration of the 5th-century BC sanctuary).
- Polygonal walls
- Ponte della Catena ("Chain Bridge"), of Roman origin.
- Oratory of SS. Annunziata, with frescos.
- Church of St. John the Baptist (16th century).

== Cultural events ==
Each year, international folk dance groups perform in Cori as part of the Latium World Folkloric Festival, a CIOFF event.

== International relations ==
Cori is twinned with:

- Pefki, Greece
- Oświęcim, Poland
