= Octavius Mamilius =

Prince and dictator of the Latin city of Tusculum (died 498/496 BC)

Octavius Mamilius (Note: His praenomen may have actually been Octavus.) (died 498/496 BC) was princeps ("leader, prince") of Tusculum, an ancient city of Latium. He was the son-in-law of Lucius Tarquinius Superbus, the seventh and last king of Rome. According to tradition, the gens Mamilia was descended from Mamilia, reputedly a granddaughter of Ulysses (Odysseus) and Circe. Titus Livius described Octavius as head of one of the most distinguished families of Latium, and thus an important ally of Tarquinius.

== Efforts to restore Tarquinius ==
Following the overthrow of his father-in-law in 509 BC, Mamilius was associated with various efforts to restore Tarquinius to the throne. After the war between Clusium and Rome failed to win back the throne for Tarquinius, he sought refuge with Mamilius in Tusculum. With all hope of further aid from the Etruscans ended, Mamilius turned to the cities and towns of Latium, comprising some thirty communities. Some towns formerly allied with Rome were receptive to his overtures, while others dissented and joined the Roman cause.

== Battle of Lake Regillus ==
In 498/496 BC, Mamilius, now Dictator (a military title) of Tusculum, marched for Rome at the head of a Latin army. They encountered a Roman expeditionary force near Lake Regillus, not far from Tusculum. The Romans were led by the Dictator, Aulus Postumius Albus, and his Magister Equitum, Titus Aebutius Elva.

The fighting was especially fierce, as both the aged king Tarquinius and his last surviving son, Titus Tarquinius, were present and participated in the battle. Titus Aebutius and Octavius Mamilius, both fighting on horseback, charged one another and were seriously wounded. Mamilius was wounded in the breast and taken to the rear, while Aebutius' arm was so severely injured by his opponent's lance that he had to withdraw from the field and direct his forces at a distance.

Later in the battle, Mamilius hurried to the front with several companies of reserves, in order to relieve a company of Roman exiles under Titus Tarquinius, who had nearly been cut off by the dictator Postumius. As he did so, he was recognized by the Roman general Titus Herminius, who charged so fiercely that he killed the Latin prince with a single thrust of his spear. His triumph was short-lived, however; as Herminius stooped to claim Mamilius' armor as spoils, he was mortally wounded by a javelin. Postumius successfully rallied the Roman forces to carry the day.

== Legacy ==
The defeat of Octavius Mamilius and the Latin army at the Battle of Lake Regillus ended the last serious attempt by Tarquinius to regain the throne. He died an old man at Cumae two years later (some historians placed the battle itself in 496 BC, in which year Postumius was consul). Lucius Mamilius, perhaps the grandson of Octavius, was dictator of Tusculum in 460 BC, and sent an army to assist the Romans in recovering the Capitol during a revolt. Two years later, he was granted Roman citizenship by the Senate in recognition of his assistance in a war against the Aequi and Volsci. Some members of the gens Mamilia later emigrated to Rome.
