= Suessa Pometia =

Town in Latium (modern Italy) that existed until c. 495 BC

Suessa Pometia (Greek: Σούεσσα Πωμεντιάνη; also Pometia) was an ancient city of Latium, which had ceased to exist in historical times. Although the modern city of Pomezia is named after it, the exact location of the ancient city is unknown.

It bordered on the Pomptinus ager or Pomptinae Paludes, which supposedly took its name. Virgil reckons it among the colonies of Alba, and must therefore have considered it as a Latin city: it is found also in the list of the same colonies given by Diodorus; but it seems certain that it had at a very early period become a Volscian city. It was taken from that people by Tarquinius Superbus, the first of the Roman kings who is mentioned as having made war on the Volsci: Strabo indeed calls it the metropolis of the Volsci, for which we have no other authority; and it is probable that this is a mere inference from the statements as to its great wealth and power. These represent it as a place of such opulence, that it was with the booty derived from thence that Tarquinius was able to commence and carry on the construction of the Capitoline temple at Rome. This was indeed related by some writers of Apiolae, another city taken by Tarquin, but the current tradition seems to have been that connected with Pometia. The name of Suessa Pometia is only once mentioned before this time, as the place where the sons of Ancus Marcius retired into exile on the accession of Servius.

It is clear also that it survived its capture by Tarquin, and even appears again in the wars of the Republic with the Volscians, as a place of great power and importance. Livy indeed calls it a Colonia Latina, but there is no account of it becoming such. It, however, revolted (according to his account) in 503 BC together with Cora and with the assistance of the Aurunci, and was not taken until the following year, by Sp. Cassius, when the city was destroyed and the inhabitants sold as slaves. It nevertheless appears again a few years afterwards (495 BC) in the hands of the Volscians, at which time children of the leading men of the city were offered as hostages to prevent war, but when war broke out soon afterwards the city was again taken and pillaged by the consul Publius Servilius Priscus Structus.

This time the blow seems to have been decisive; for the name of Suessa Pometia is never again mentioned in history, and all trace of it disappears. Pliny notices it among the cities which were in his time utterly extinct. and no record seems to have been preserved even of its site. We are, however, distinctly told that the Pomptinus ager and the Pomptine tribe derived their appellation from this city, and there can therefore be no doubt that it stood in that district or on the verge of it.

According to modern theories, the city would stood near Cisterna di Latina, or maybe coincided with Borgo Podgora (Latina); or the Latin Pometia or Suessa Pometia would have been none other than Satricum before the Volscian conquest of 488 BC by Gneus Marcius Coriolanus, in consequence of which the city would assumed the Volscian name.
