= 490s BC =

Decade

This article concerns the period 499 BC – 490 BC.

== Events ==
=== 499 BC ===
==== By place ====
====== Greece ======
- After a failed attack on the rebellious island of Naxos in c. 501 BC (on behalf of the Persians), Aristagoras, tyrant of Miletus, to save himself from the wrath of Persia, plans a revolt with the Milesians and the other Ionians. With the encouragement of Histiaeus (his father-in-law and former tyrant of Miletus), Aristagoras induces the Ionian cities of Asia Minor to revolt against Persia, thus instigating the Ionian Revolt and beginning the Greco-Persian Wars between Greece and Persia. The pro-Persian tyrant of Mytilene is stoned to death.
- Miltiades the Younger, the ruler of the Thracian Chersonese, which has been under Persian suzerainty since approximately 514 BC, joins the Ionian revolt. He seizes the islands of Lemnos and Imbros from the Persians.
- Aristagoras seeks help with the revolt against the Persians from Cleomenes I, king of Sparta, but the Spartans are unwilling to respond.

=== 498 BC ===
==== By place ====
====== Greece ======
- Alexander I succeeds his father Amyntas I as king of Macedonia.
- Athens and Eretria respond to the Ionian plea for help against Persia and send troops. An Athenian and Eretrian fleet transports Athenian troops to Ephesus. There they are joined by a force of Ionians and march upon Sardis, the capital of Artaphernes (the satrap of Lydia and brother to Darius I of Persia). Artaphernes, who has sent most of his troops to besiege Miletus, is taken by surprise. However, Artaphernes is able to retreat to the citadel and hold it. Although the Greeks are unable to take the citadel, they pillage the town and set fires that burn Sardis to the ground.
- Retreating to the coast, the Greek forces are met by the Persians under Artaphernes and defeated in the Battle of Ephesus.
- Kaunos and Caria, followed by Byzantium and towns in the Hellespont also revolt against the Persians. Cyprus also joins the rebellion, as Onesilus removes his pro-Persian brother, Gorgos, from the throne of Salamis.

====== Sicily ======
- After the assassination of Cleander, tyrant of Gela, power is transferred to his brother, Hippocrates, who subdues the Sicels and conquers the Chalcidian cities of Callipoli, Leontini, Naxos and Zancle (now known as Messina). He also captures the Syracusan city of Camarina, but is prevented from capturing Syracuse itself when Corinth and Corcyra interferes in the war.

==== By topic ====
====== Literature ======
- The Greek poet Pindar composes his earliest surviving epinikion (Pythian ode 10).

=== 497 BC ===
==== By place ====
====== Greece ======
- Artybius ends the rebellion in Cyprus.
- The Persians launch an expedition on the Hellespont and later Caria.

=== 496 BC ===
==== By place ====
====== Greece ======
- Hipparchos, son of Charmos (a relative of the 6th century BC tyrant Peisistratus), wins the archonship of Athens as leader of the peace party which argues that resistance against the Persians is useless.
- Tisicrates of Kroton wins the stadion race at the 71st Olympic Games.

====== Roman Republic ======
- The former Etruscan King of Rome, Tarquinius Superbus, who had been exiled by the Romans in 509 BC, and his ally Octavius Mamilius, of Tusculum, together with the Latins are defeated by the Roman Republic army in the Battle of Lake Regillus, near Frascati. The outcome of this battle establishes Roman supremacy over the Latins.

====== China ======
- King Goujian of Yue defeats and mortally injures King Helü of Wu

=== 495 BC ===
==== Roman Republic ====
- A temple is built on the Circus Maximus, between the Aventine and Palatine hills, in Rome, in honour of the god Mercury and was dedicated on 15 May.
- The number of Roman tribes is increased to 21.
- Additional colonists were sent to the colony at Signia.
- The Volsci launch an invasion against Rome, but are defeated, and in retaliation Rome plunders Suessa Pometia.
- Roman troops defeat an invading force of Sabines.
- Roman troops defeat an army of the Aurunci near the town of Aricia.
- The beginning of discord between the plebs and patricians leading to the first secession of the plebs.

==== China ====
- King Fuchai of Wu ascends to the throne after his father, King Helü of Wu, reigning as the last king of Wu until 473 BC.

=== 494 BC ===
==== By place ====
====== Persian empire ======
- Having successfully captured several of the revolting Greek city-states, the Persians under Artaphernes lay siege to Miletus. The decisive Battle of Lade is fought at the island of Lade, near Miletus' port. Although out-numbered, the Greek fleet appears to be winning the battle until the ships from Samos and Lesbos retreat. The sudden defection turns the tide of battle, and the remaining Greek fleet is completely destroyed. Miletus surrenders shortly thereafter, and the Ionian Revolt comes to an end.
- The Persian leaders Artaphernes and Mardonius grant a degree of autonomy to the Ionian cities. They abstain from financial reprisals and merely exact former levels of tribute. The Persians abolish the Greek tyrannies in Ionia and permit democracies.
- The Persians burn down the Temple of Apollo at Didyma.

====== Greece ======
- The Phoenician allies of the Persians retaliate fiercely against the Greeks, whom they perceive as pirates, unleashing savage reprisals..
- The Thracians and Scythians drive Miltiades the Younger from the Chersonesos. Miltiades loads five boats with his treasures and makes for Athens. One of the boats, captained by Miltiades' eldest son, Metiochos is captured. Metiochos is taken as a lifelong prisoner to Persia.
- The Spartan king, Cleomenes I inflicts a severe defeat on Argos at Sepeia near Tiryns (approximate date).

====== Roman republic ======
- The Senate appoints Manius Valerius Maximus to the office of dictator to deal with a series of military threats, and a popular uprising.
- The dictator Valerius defeats the Sabines, and is awarded a triumph plus the honour of a curule chair in the circus maximus.
- The Roman consul Aulus Verginius Tricostus Caeliomontanus defeats the Volsci, and a Roman colony is planted at Velitrae.
- The Roman consul Titus Veturius Geminus Cicurinus defeats the Aequi at the request of Rome's Latin allies.
- At the end of the military campaigns, the plebs retire to the Sacred Mountain outside Rome in the Secession of the Plebs. To end the secession, the plebeians gain acceptance from the patricians that they may choose two leaders to whom they give the title of Tribunes. The office of the tribunate is thereby established.
- The aediles, magistrates of ancient Rome who are in charge of the temple and cult of Ceres, are first established. They are two officials of the plebeians, created at the same time as the tribunes, whose sanctity they share.

=== 493 BC ===
==== By place ====
====== Persian Empire ======
- A Phoenician-manned Persian fleet restores Persian control of Cyprus.

====== Greece ======
- The Athenian people elect Themistocles as archon, the chief judicial and civilian executive officer in Athens. He favours resistance against the Persians.
- Themistocles starts the construction of a fortified naval base at Piraeus, the port town of Athens.
- Among the refugees arriving from Ionia after the collapse of the Ionian Revolt is a chief named Miltiades, who has a fine reputation as a soldier. Themistocles makes him a general in the Athenian army.

====== Roman Republic ======
- The secession of the plebs concludes.
- The Roman army, led by Postumus Cominius Auruncus defeats the Volsci and the Romans capture the towns of Longula, Pollusca and Corioli. Gaius Marcius distinguishes himself in the battle for Corioli, and earns the cognomen Coriolanus.
- During his second consulate, the Roman consul Spurius Cassius Vecellinus concludes a treaty with the Latin League, the Foedus Cassianum, confirming Roman primacy in Latium.

==== By topic ====
====== Literature ======
- The Athenian poet Phrynicus produces a tragedy on the Fall of Miletus. The Athenian authorities ban the play from further production on the grounds of impiety.

=== 492 BC ===
==== By place ====
====== Greece ======
- The first expedition of King Darius I of Persia against Greece commences under the leadership of his son-in-law and general, Mardonius. Darius sends Mardonius to succeed his satrap (governor) in Ionia, Artaphernes, with a special commission to attack Athens and Eretria.
- The Persians under Mardonius subdue and capture Thrace and Macedonia.
- Mardonius loses some 300 ships in a storm off Mount Athos, which forces him to abandon his plans to attack Athens and Eretria.
- Tisicrates wins the stadion race for a second time at the 72nd Olympic Games.

====== Sicily ======
- When Camarina, a Syracusan colony, rebels, Hippocrates, the tyrant of Gela, intervenes to wage war against Syracuse. After defeating the Syracusan army at the Heloros River, he besieges the city. However, he is persuaded by the intervention of forces from the Greek mainland city of Corinth to retreat in exchange for the possession of Camarina.

====== Rome ======
- Following the conclusion of the secession of the plebs, a famine strikes Rome. The consuls avert the crisis by obtaining grain from Etruria.
- War with the Volsci is averted because a pestilence affects the Volsci. Rome sends additional colonists to Velitrae and establishes a new colony in Norba.

=== 491 BC ===
==== By place ====
====== Greece ======
- Darius I sends envoys to all Greek cities, demanding "earth and water for vassalage" which Athens and Sparta refuse.
- The Greek city of Aegina, fearing the loss of trade, submits to Persia. The Spartan king, Cleomenes I tries to punish Aegina for its submission to the Persians, but the other Spartan king, Demaratus, thwarts him.
- Cleomenes I engineers the deposing of Spartan co-ruler Demaratus (and his replacement by Cleomenes’ cousin Leotychidas) by bribing the oracle at Delphi to announce that this action was divine will. The two Spartan kings successfully capture the Persian collaborators in Aegina.

====== Sicily ======
- Hippocrates, tyrant of Gela, loses his life in a battle against the Siculi, the native Sicilian people. He is succeeded as Tyrant of Gela by Gelo, who had been his commander of cavalry.

====== Roman Republic ======
- During this year there was a famine in Rome. General Gais Marcius Coriolanus suggested that people should not receive grains unless they agree to abolish the Office of Tribune. Because of this, the Tribunes had him exiled. In response, Coriolanus takes refuge with the leader of the Volsci, eventually leading the Volscian army in a war against Rome. It was only due to entreaties from his mother and wife that he abandoned his war against Rome.
- On the Via Latina, a main road leading out of Rome, the Temple of Fortuna Muliebras was finished.

==== By topic ====
====== Art ======
- The construction of a relief begins in the Apadana, a ceremonial complex at Persepolis. The relief pictures Darius I and Xerxes I receiving tribute and is now displayed in the Oriental Institute of the University of Chicago.

=== 490 BC ===
==== By place ====
====== Greece ======
- Darius I sends an expedition, under Artaphernes and Datis the Mede, across the Aegean to attack the Athenians and the Eretrians. Hippias, the aged ex-tyrant of Athens, is on one of the Persian ships in the hope of being restored to power in Athens.
- When the Ionian Greeks in Asia Minor rebelled against Persia in 499 BC, Eretria joined Athens in sending aid to the rebels. As a result, Darius makes a point of punishing Eretria during his invasion of Greece. The city is sacked and burned and its inhabitants are enslaved. He intends the same fate for Athens.
- September 12 – The Battle of Marathon takes place as a Persian army of more than 20,000 men is advised by Hippias to land in the Bay of Marathon, where they meet the Athenians supported by the Plataeans. The Persians are repulsed by 11,500 Greeks under the leadership of Callimachus and Miltiades. Some 6,400 Persians are killed at a cost of 192 Athenian dead. Callimachus, the war-archon of Athens, is killed in the battle. After the battle, the Persians return home.
- Before the Battle of Marathon, the Athenians send a runner, Pheidippides, to seek help from Sparta. However, the Spartans delay sending troops to Marathon because religious requirements (the Carneia) mean they must wait for the full moon.
- The Greek historian Herodotus, the main source for the Greco-Persian Wars, mentions Pheidippides as the messenger who runs from Athens to Sparta asking for help, and then runs back, a distance of over 240 kilometres each way. After the battle, he runs back to Athens to spread the news and raise the spirits. It is claimed that his last words before collapsing and dying in Athens are "Chairete, nikomen" ("Rejoice, we are victorious").
- Hippias dies at Lemnos on the journey back to Sardis after the Persian defeat.
- Cleomenes I is forced to flee Sparta when his plot against Demaratus is discovered, but the Spartans allow him to return when he begins gathering an army in the surrounding territories. However, by this time he has become insane, and the Spartans put him in prison. Shortly after, he commits suicide. He is succeeded as King of Sparta by a member of the Agiad house, his half-brother, Leonidas.

====== Europe ======
- Carthaginian navigator Himilco is the first known explorer from the Mediterranean Sea to reach the northwestern shores of Europe (approximate date).

==== By topic ====
====== Architecture ======
- The Athenians begin the building of a temple to Athena Parthenos (approximate date).
- Stelae are once again allowed in Athenian cemeteries, having been banned since 510 BC.

== Births ==
496 BC

- Sophocles, Athenian dramatist and statesman (d. 406 BC)

495 BC

- Pericles, Athenian politician (d. 429 BC)

490 BC

- Empedocles, Greek philosopher (d. c. 430 BC)
- Zeno of Elea, Greek philosopher (d. c. 430 BC)

== Deaths ==
498 BC

- Amyntas I, king of Macedonia (b. c. 540 BC)
- Cleander, tyrant of Gela

497 BC

- Onesilus, King of Salamis

496 BC

- Sun Tzu, military philosopher and author of The Art of War (most likely a colloquial date) (b. 544 BC)
- King Helü of Wu, king of the Chinese State of Wu
- Marcus Valerius Volusus and Titus Herminius Aquilinus, both former Roman consuls died at the Battle of Lake Regillus
- Octavius Mamilius, ruler of Tusculum also died at the Battle of Lake Regillus
- Iccus of Epidaurus, Olympic boxer, died while boxing Cleomedes of Astypalaea

495 BC

- Pythagoras of Samos
- Tarquinius Superbus, former king of Rome died in exile in Cumae

494 BC

- Histiaeus, tyrant of Miletus

493 BC

- Agrippa Menenius Lanatus, former Roman consul.
- Cleisthenes

491 BC

- Hippocrates, tyrant of Gela

490 BC

- Hippias, tyrant of Athens
- Callimachus, war-archon of Athens
- Appius Claudius Sabinus Regillensis, legendary founder of the gens Claudia
- Pheidippides, messenger and soldier of Athens
