= 494 BC =

494 BC in various calendars
- Gregorian calendar: 494 BC; CDXCIV BC
- Ab urbe condita: 260
- Ancient Egypt era: XXVII dynasty, 32
- Pharaoh: Darius I of Persia, 28
- Ancient Greek Olympiad (summer): 71st Olympiad, year 3
- Assyrian calendar: 4257
- Balinese saka calendar: N/A
- Bengali calendar: −1087 – −1086
- Berber calendar: 457
- Buddhist calendar: 51
- Burmese calendar: −1131
- Byzantine calendar: 5015–5016
- Chinese calendar: 丙午年 (Fire Horse); 2204 or 1997 — to — 丁未年 (Fire Goat); 2205 or 1998
- Coptic calendar: −777 – −776
- Discordian calendar: 673
- Ethiopian calendar: −501 – −500
- Hebrew calendar: 3267–3268
- Hindu calendars
- Vikram Samvat: −437 – −436
- Shaka Samvat: N/A
- Kali Yuga: 2607–2608
- Holocene calendar: 9507
- Iranian calendar: 1115 BP – 1114 BP
- Islamic calendar: 1149 BH – 1148 BH
- Javanese calendar: N/A
- Julian calendar: N/A
- Korean calendar: 1840
- Minguo calendar: 2405 before ROC 民前2405年
- Nanakshahi calendar: −1961
- Thai solar calendar: 49–50
- Tibetan calendar: མེ་ཕོ་རྟ་ལོ་ (male Fire-Horse) −367 or −748 or −1520 — to — མེ་མོ་ལུག་ལོ་ (female Fire-Sheep) −366 or −747 or −1519

Year 494 BC was a year of the pre-Julian Roman calendar. At the time, it was known as the Year of the Consulship of Tricostus and Geminus (or, less frequently, year 260 Ab urbe condita). The denomination 494 BC for this year has been used since the early medieval period, when the Anno Domini calendar era became the prevalent method in Europe for naming years.

== Events ==
=== By place ===
==== Persian empire ====
- Having successfully captured several of the revolting Greek city-states, the Persians under Artaphernes lay siege to Miletus. The decisive Battle of Lade is fought at the island of Lade, near Miletus' port. Although out-numbered, the Greek fleet appears to be winning the battle until the ships from Samos and Lesbos retreat. The sudden defection turns the tide of battle, and the remaining Greek fleet is completely destroyed. Miletus surrenders shortly thereafter, and the Ionian Revolt comes to an end.
- The Persian leaders Artaphernes and Mardonius grant a degree of autonomy to the Ionian cities. They abstain from financial reprisals and merely exact former levels of tribute. The Persians abolish the Greek tyrannies in Ionia and permit democracies.
- The Persians burn down the Temple of Apollo at Didyma.

==== Greece ====
- The Phoenician allies of the Persians retaliate fiercely against the Greeks, whom they perceive as pirates, unleashing savage reprisals..
- The Thracians and Scythians drive Miltiades the Younger from the Chersonesos. Miltiades loads five boats with his treasures and makes for Athens. One of the boats, captained by Miltiades' eldest son, Metiochos is captured. Metiochos is taken as a lifelong prisoner to Persia.
- The Spartan king, Cleomenes I inflicts a severe defeat on Argos at Sepeia near Tiryns (approximate date).

==== Roman Republic ====
- The Senate appoints Manius Valerius Maximus to the office of dictator to deal with a series of military threats, and a popular uprising.
- The dictator Valerius defeats the Sabines, and is awarded a triumph plus the honour of a curule chair in the Circus Maximus.
- The Roman consul Aulus Verginius Tricostus Caeliomontanus defeats the Volsci, and a Roman colony is planted at Velitrae.
- The Roman consul Titus Veturius Geminus Cicurinus defeats the Aequi at the request of Rome's Latin allies.
- At the end of the military campaigns, the plebs retire to the Sacred Mountain outside Rome in the Secession of the Plebs. To end the secession, the plebeians gain acceptance from the patricians that they may choose two leaders to whom they give the title of Tribunes. The office of the tribunate is thereby established.
- The aediles, magistrates of ancient Rome who are in charge of the temple and cult of Ceres, are first established. They are two officials of the plebeians, created at the same time as the tribunes, whose sanctity they share.

== Deaths ==
- Histiaeus, tyrant of Miletus
