= Appius Claudius Sabinus Regillensis =

Roman consul in 495 BC

Consul of the Roman Republic
- In office 1 September 495 BC – 29 August 494 BC Serving with Publius Servilius Priscus Structus
- Preceded by: Aulus Postumius Albus Regillensis, Titus Verginius Tricostus Caeliomontanus
- Succeeded by: Aulus Verginius Tricostus Caeliomontanus, Titus Veturius Geminus Cicurinus (consul 494 BC)

Personal details
- Born: Unknown; Regillum, Sabinum
- Died: after 480 BC; Ancient Rome
- Children: Appius Claudius Sabinus Regillensis (consul 471 BC), Gaius Claudius Sabinus Regillensis

Appius Claudius Sabinus Regillensis or Inregillensis (fl. 505 – 480 BC) was the legendary founder of the Roman gens Claudia, and consul in 495 BC. He was the leading figure of the aristocratic party in the early Roman Republic.

== Background and migration to Rome ==
Appius Claudius was a wealthy Sabine from a town known as "Regillum". (Note: "Inregillum" in some manuscripts of Livy, but "Regillum" in others; "Regillum" in the works of Dionysius of Halicarnassus and Suetonius. It does not seem to have been very important, and its location is now lost, but both the name and the surname derived from it suggest a connection with Lake Regillus. Perhaps Claudius' surname derives from the lake, or because he was a participant in the Battle of Lake Regillus.) His original name was Attus Clausus or Attius Clausus, according to Livy; Suetonius gives Atta Claudius, while Dionysius of Halicarnassus gives Titus Claudius. From the Fasti consulares, it is known that Claudius' father was named Marcus. He had at least two sons: Appius Claudius Sabinus Regillensis, consul in 471 BC, and Gaius Claudius Sabinus Regillensis, consul in 460 BC. Appius Claudius Crassus, the decemvir, was his grandson.

In 505 BC, shortly after the establishment of the Roman Republic, Rome successfully waged war against the Sabines, and in the following year, the Sabines were divided as to whether to retaliate or make peace with the Romans. Clausus favoured peace with the Romans, and as the faction favouring war became more powerful, he migrated to Rome with a large group of his clients, and took the name Appius Claudius. In recognition of his wealth and influence, he was admitted to the patriciate, and given a seat in the Senate, where he quickly became one of the leading men. (Note: Dionysius reports that Claudius' followers included no fewer than five hundred men able to bear arms, a very substantial contribution to the early Roman state. This may account for what is the only recorded instance of a new gens being admitted to the patriciate during the Roman Republic.) His followers were allotted land on the far side of the Anio, and along with other Sabines formed the basis of the "Old Claudian" tribe.

== Consulship ==
In 495 BC, nine years after he arrived at Rome, Claudius was consul with Publius Servilius Priscus Structus. He may previously have been quaestor. The consulship of Claudius and Servilius was marked by the welcome news of the death of Tarquin at Cumae, where the last King of Rome had fled after the Battle of Lake Regillus. However, the end of a threat which had unified the social strata at Rome also encouraged the patrician aristocracy to take advantage of its position, foreshadowing the approaching Conflict of the Orders. New settlers were sent to Signia, where a colony had been established by the old king; the tribus Claudia was formally incorporated into the Roman state; and a new Temple of Mercury was completed.

Meanwhile, the Volsci began preparations for war, enlisting the aid of the Hernici and approaching the Latins. Stung by their recent defeat at Lake Regillus, the Latins were in no mood for war, and instead delivered the Volscian envoys to Rome, warning the Senate of the pending military threat. In gratitude, six thousand Latin prisoners were released, and the Senate agreed to consider a treaty with the Latins, which had previously been refused.

But the city's attention was suddenly diverted from the threat of war with the Volsci by the appearance of chained men, who had been handed over to their creditors after falling irretrievably into debt, among whom was an old soldier who had lost his home and property while fighting for his country in the Sabine war. Cries for justice soon overtook the streets, and the consuls hastily attempted to convene the Senate, although many of the senators hid in fear for their lives. Claudius urged the arrest of the supposed troublemakers, supposing that the people would be cowed if an example were made of their leaders. Servilius, meanwhile, urged the Senate to negotiate with the plebeians in hopes of resolving the crisis.

While the Senate was debating, news arrived from Latium that the Volscians were on the march. Popular sentiment was that the patricians should fight their own war, without aid from the plebs; so the Senate, feeling that the consul Servilius would be more likely to gain the trust of the plebeians in this time of emergency, entreated him to effect a reconciliation. Servilius addressed the people, urging them that they need unite against a common threat, and that nothing could be gained by attempting to force the Senate's action. He declared that no man who volunteered to serve against the Volscian invasion might be imprisoned or given over to his creditors, nor should any creditor molest the families or property of any soldier, and that those who had already been shackled should be freed in order to serve in the coming battle.

After detecting a Volscian surprise attack, the consul Servilius, in whose vanguard were many of the freed debtors, led a successful assault on the Volsci, who broke and fled. Servilius captured the Volscian camp, and continued on to the Volscian town of Suessa Pometia, which he also took. A Sabine raiding party took advantage of the consul's absence to enter Roman territory, but they were pursued by Aulus Postumius Albus Regillensis, the former dictator, until Servilius was able to join him, and the two routed the Sabines. No sooner had they done so, than envoys arrived from the Aurunci, threatening war unless the Romans departed the territory of the Volscians. While Rome prepared her defenses, Servilius marched against the Aurunci, and defeated them decisively in a battle near Aricia.

At Rome, Claudius ordered three hundred Volscian hostages from a previous conflict be brought to the Forum, where he had them publicly scourged and then beheaded. When the consul Servilius returned and sought the honour of a triumph for his victories, Claudius vigorously opposed it, arguing that Servilius had encouraged sedition and sided with the plebs against the state; he especially deplored the fact that Servilius had allowed his soldiers to keep the spoils of their victory at Suessa Pometia, rather than depositing it in the treasury. The Senate thus rejected Servilius' request; but appealing to the people's sense of honour, the consul received a triumphal procession in spite of the Senate's decree.

Following the successes of their army, the Roman debtors looked for relief; but the consul Claudius instead resorted to the harshest possible measures, ignoring the promises made by his colleague when war threatened the very existence of the Roman state. Fueled by his own arrogance and a desire to discredit Servilius, he returned those who had previously been bound to their creditors, and sentenced those who had formerly been free to servitude. The people begged Servilius once again to come to their aid, but feeling he could make no headway against Claudius and his supporters in the Senate, he did little, and so became as hated as his colleague. When the consuls could not agree as to which of them should dedicate the Temple of Mercury, the Senate gave the decision to the plebs, expecting them to choose Servilius as their champion; but instead they chose a centurion, Marcus Laetorius, over either consul, infuriating both the Senate and Claudius.

Plebeian mobs soon began interceding on behalf of those who had been bound for debt, freeing them and beating their creditors, shouting down the orders of the consul and ignoring his decrees. When news of a Sabine invasion arrived, the people refused to enlist, and Claudius accused his colleague of treason for failing to pass sentence on debtors or raise troops as demanded, in defiance of the Senate's orders. "Nevertheless, Rome is not utterly deserted; the authority of the consuls is not yet altogether thrown away. I myself will stand up, alone, for the majesty of my office and of the Senate." Claudius then ordered the arrest of one of the plebeian leaders, who appealed from the consul's judgment as the lictors were dragging him away. At first Claudius thought to ignore the appeal, in violation of the lex Valeria, which granted the right of appeal to all Roman citizens; but so fierce was the uproar that he was forced to release the man. Before the year was out, groups of plebeians began meeting in secret to discuss a course of action.

== Secession of the plebs ==
In the following year, word reached the Senate of groups of plebeians meeting at night on the Aventine and Esquiline Hills. The senators called for the harsh response of a man like Appius Claudius, and ordered the consuls to levy troops in order to quell the unrest and meet an impending threat from the Aequi, Volsci, and Sabines. But none of the plebs would answer the summons unless their demands for relief and liberty from the harsh debt that oppressed them were met. Powerless to carry out their instructions, the consuls were called upon to resign, but they demanded the senators stand with them as they attempted to do so. After abandoning the effort, the Senate debated three proposals: the consul Aulus Verginius Tricostus Caeliomontanus opposed general debt relief, but suggested that the Senate make good on his predecessor's promises to the men who had fought against the Volsci, Aurunci, and Sabines the previous year. Titus Larcius, who had been twice consul, as well as the first Roman dictator, felt that preferential treatment for some debtors and not others risked increasing the unrest, and argued that only general relief would resolve the situation.

Opposing any relief was Claudius, who asserted that the true cause of the unrest was the people's disregard for the law, and the right of appeal, which had deprived the consuls of their proper authority: "I urge you, therefore, to appoint a dictator, from whom there is no right of appeal. Do that, and you will quickly enough throw water on the blaze. I should like to see anyone use force against a lictor then, when he knows that the power to scourge or kill him is wholly in the hands of the man whose majesty he has dared to offend!"

This measure seemed overly severe to many of the senators, but Claudius won the day, and was nearly appointed dictator himself. Instead, the Senate appointed Manius Valerius Maximus, brother of Publius, whose laws had granted the right of appeal to the Roman people. Valerius, already a trusted figure, reiterated the promises of liberty and relief from the harsh penalties of debt that the consul Servilius had made the previous year, and was able to raise ten legions, with which he and the two consuls defeated the Aequi, Volsci, and Sabines. On his triumphant return, Valerius proceeded to the Senate to fulfill the promises he had made to the people. But the Senate rejected his entreaty, and Valerius resigned his office, rebuking the senators for their intractability.

Soon afterward, the Senate again ordered the army into the field to meet a pretended force of Aequi, and relying on the soldiers' oaths to obey the consuls. But the soldiers mutinied, and withdrew en masse to the Sacred Mount. With the city all but defenseless, and the remaining inhabitants each fearful of the other, Agrippa Menenius Lanatus, who had himself been consul in 503 BC, urged the Senate to attempt a reconciliation with the plebs, and was seconded by Valerius, who described Claudius as "an enemy of the people, and a champion of oligarchy," leading the Roman state to its destruction. Claudius, however, berated Valerius and Menenius for their weakness and criticisms, and argued just as forcefully against negotiating or making any concession to the people, whom he described as animals.

After much debate, the Senate agreed to dispatch ten envoys to negotiate with the plebeians. Among these were Menenius and Valerius; Servilius, consul of the previous year; Lartius, and several other former consuls who had earned the people's trust. The conflict was finally resolved when the Senate agreed — once again over the objection of Claudius — to a discharge of debts, and the establishment of the plebeian tribunes, who had the power to veto the actions of the Senate and the consuls, and who were themselves sacrosanct, the entire body of the plebs obliged to defend them from any assault. Once the new officials had been appointed, the soldiers agreed to return to the city, ending the first "Secession of the Plebs."

The "Conflict of the Orders" would continue for another two centuries, as the plebeians continually struggled for greater rights and political equality, and the patricians fought to retain control of the state. Throughout the years, Claudius and his descendants would continually oppose all such reforms with all the pride and arrogance that the consul had himself displayed.

== Later career ==
Rome was struck by a grain shortage in the following year, and strife between the patricians and plebeians returned, as the wealthy were accused of hoarding food. Once again, Claudius urged the Senate to take a hard line against the mob and all who encouraged them. Calmer voices prevailed, and food was eventually procured from Aristodemus of Cumae (at the cost of several ships that Aristodemus retained as payment) and from Etruria.

Two years later, in 491 BC, Rome was still recovering from the famine, and grain prices were still oppressively high. Gaius Marcius Coriolanus, a young senator who had won fame on the battlefield after helping to capture the city of Corioli from the Volsci, and who had since become a champion of the Roman aristocracy, praised Appius Claudius for his firm stance against the plebeians, and urged that the Senate take no action to relieve the distress of the people, unless the plebs agreed to surrender the hard-won privilege of electing their own tribunes. The cry arose that Coriolanus would have the Senate starve the people into submission, and he was only saved from a riot when the same tribunes ordered his arrest.

Claudius, who had long distinguished himself as "the greatest enemy of the plebeians", rallied to Coriolanus' defense, haranguing the populace for their treachery and ingratitude, and accusing them of conspiring against the government of the Republic. Manius Valerius again spoke in opposition, urging that the people had the right to bring Coriolanus to trial, and that he might be acquitted, or treated with leniency, were the cause against him to proceed. Coriolanus submitted to trial, and was convicted of aspiring to tyranny by a vote of twelve of the twenty-one tribes; but in recognition of his former service to the state, he was only sentenced to banishment.

In 486, the consul Spurius Cassius Vecellinus concluded a treaty with the Hernici, and proposed the first agrarian law, with the intention of distributing a neglected portion of public land among the plebeians and the allies. Once again, Claudius was in the forefront of the opposition in the Senate, arguing that the people were idle and would be unable to farm the land, and accusing Cassius of encouraging sedition. Cassius' plan was rejected, and the following year he was brought to trial by the patricians, who accused him of aspiring to royal power. Convicted, he was scourged and put to death, his house was pulled down, his property seized by the state, and his three young sons barely escaped execution.

In 480 BC, when Titus Pontificius, one of the tribunes of the plebs, exhorted the plebeians to refuse enrolment for military service until agrarian reform was undertaken, Claudius convinced the senate to oppose Pontificius by obtaining the support of other tribunes, and no reform was attempted.

== See also ==
- Claudia (gens)

== Bibliography ==
- Titus Livius (Livy), Ab Urbe Condita (History of Rome).
- Gaius Suetonius Tranquillus, De Vita Caesarum (Lives of the Caesars, or The Twelve Caesars).
- Dionysius of Halicarnassus, Romaike Archaiologia.
- "Appius Claudius Sabinus Regillensis" (no. 1) in the Dictionary of Greek and Roman Biography and Mythology, William Smith, ed., Little, Brown and Company, Boston (1849).
- T. Robert S. Broughton, The Magistrates of the Roman Republic, American Philological Association (1952).
- Oxford Classical Dictionary, N. G. L. Hammond and H. H. Scullard, eds., Clarendon Press, Oxford (Second Edition, 1970).

Political offices
Preceded by Aulus Postumius Albus Regillensis and Titus Verginius Tricostus Caeliomontanus	Consul of the Roman Republic; 495 BC with Publius Servilius Priscus Structus	Succeeded by Aulus Verginius Tricostus Caeliomontanus and Titus Veturius Geminus Cicurinus
