= Verginia gens =

Ancient Roman family

The gens Verginia or Virginia was a prominent family at ancient Rome, which from an early period was divided into patrician and plebeian branches. The gens was of great antiquity. It frequently filled the highest honors of the state during the early years of the Republic. The first of the family who obtained the consulship was Opiter Verginius Tricostus in 502 BC, the seventh year of the Republic. The plebeian members of the family were also numbered amongst the early tribunes of the people.

== Origin ==
The orthography of the nomen Verginius or Virginius has been disputed since ancient times; but Verginius is the form usually found in both manuscripts and inscriptions. Modern writers seem to favor Virginius, perhaps by analogy to virgo, a maiden. A similar instance is presented by the nomen Vergilius, which in modern times is often spelt Virgilius. The gens was likely of Etruscan origins, and may have come to Rome with the Tarquins.

== Praenomina ==
The early Verginii favored the praenomina Opiter, Proculus, Titus, Aulus, Lucius, and Spurius. In later times they used mainly Lucius, Aulus, and Titus.

== Branches and cognomina ==
All of the patrician Verginii bore the cognomen Tricostus, but they were divided into various families with the surnames of Caeliomontanus, Esquilinus, and Rutilus, respectively. The surnames Caeliomontanus and Esquilinus presumably derive from the Caelian and Esquiline Hills, where these families probably lived. Rutilus is derived from a Latin adjective, meaning "reddish," and was probably acquired because some of the Verginii had red hair. The general Lucius Verginius Rufus, who lived in the 1st century AD, may have obtained his cognomen for the same reason. Although the plebeian Verginii are also mentioned at an early period, none of them had any cognomen. Under the Empire there are Verginii with other surnames.

== Members ==
This list includes abbreviated praenomina. For an explanation of this practice, see filiation.

=== Verginii Tricosti ===
- Opiter Verginius Tricostus, father of the consul of 502 BC.
- Opiter Verginius Opet. f. Tricostus, consul in 502 BC; together with his colleague, Spurius Cassius Vecellinus, he carried on war against the Aurunci, and took Pometia, in consequence of which the consuls obtained a triumph.
- Opiter Verginius Opet. f. Opet. n. Tricostus, according to Livius, consul in 473 BC with Lucius Aemilius Mamercus; other authorities name Vopiscus Julius Iulus as the colleague of Aemilius.
- Proculus Verginius Tricostus, consul in 435 BC, in which year there was a great pestilence at Rome, allowing the Fidenates and Veientes to advance deep into Roman territory. While his colleague, Gaius Julius Iulus commanded the city's defenses, Virginius consulted the senate and nominated Lucius Aemilius Mamercinus as dictator.
- Lucius Verginius Tricostus, tribunus militum consulari potestate in 389 BC, the year following the Gallic sack of Rome.

==== Tricosti Caeliomontani ====
- Aulus Verginius Tricostus Caeliomontanus, father of the consuls of 496 and 494 BC.
- Titus Verginius A. f. Tricostus Caeliomontanus, consul in 496 BC with Aulus Postumius Albus Regillensis.
- Aulus Verginius A. f. Tricostus Caeliomontanus, consul in 494 BC, he marched against the Volsci, whom he defeated, and took the town of Velitrae. He was one of the envoys sent by the senate to treat with the plebs during the secession of that year.
- Titus Verginius Tricostus Caeliomontanus, father of the consul of 448 BC.
- Aulus Verginius A. f. A. n. Tricostus Caeliomontanus, consul in 469 BC, marched against the Aequi. His army was nearly destroyed in consequence of his own negligence, but through the valor of his soldiers he eventually defeated the Aequian force.
- Spurius Verginius A. f. A. n. Tricostus Caeliomontanus, consul in 456 BC; in his consulship the ludi saeculares are said to have been celebrated for the second time.
- Spurius Verginius S. f. A. n. Tricostus Caeliomontanus, a patrician youth who gave testimony against Titus Romilius Rocus Vaticanus, during his trial in 454 BC.
- Titus Verginius T. f. Tricostus Caeliomontanus, consul in 448 BC.

==== Tricosti Esquilini ====
- Opiter Verginius Tricostus Esquilinus, consul suffectus in 478 BC, in the place of Gaius Servilius Structus Ahala, who died in his year of office.
- Lucius Verginius Opet. f. Tricostus Esquilinus, father of the consular tribune of 402 BC.
- Lucius Verginius L. f. Opet. n. Tricostus Esquilinus, tribunus militum consulari potestate in 402 BC; the siege of Veii was entrusted to him and his colleague, Manius Sergius Fidenas, but because of their personal enmity, the Veientes were relieved, and Sergius' force was overpowered. The two tribunes were compelled to resign, and in the following year they were tried and condemned to pay a heavy fine.

==== Tricosti Rutili ====
- Proculus Verginius Opet. f. Opet. n. Tricostus Rutilus, consul in 486 BC, marched against the Aequi, but as they would not meet him in the field, he ravaged their territory. He actively opposed the agrarian law brought forward by his colleague, Spurius Cassius Vecellinus.
- Titus Verginius Opet. f. Opet. n. Tricostus Rutilus, consul in 479 BC with Caeso Fabius Vibulanus; the same year the Fabii resolved to leave Rome in order to carry on the war against Veii. Verginius was an augur, and died during the great pestilence which devastated Rome in 463 BC.
- Aulus Verginius Opet. f. Opet. n. Tricostus Rutilus, consul in 476 BC.

=== Others ===
- Publius Verginius, a senator in 494 BC, during the first secession of the plebs, who advocated that debt relief be granted only to those plebeians who had served in the army.
- Aulus Verginius, tribune of the plebs in 461 BC, he accused Caeso, son of the dictator Cincinnatus, and after a severe struggle obtained his condemnation.
- Lucius Verginius, the father of Verginia, whose tragic fate occasioned the downfall of the decemvirs, in 449 BC; he was subsequently elected one of the tribuni plebis for that year.
- Verginia L. f., was taken into custody by Marcus Claudius, a client of Appius Claudius Crassus, who claimed her as his slave. According to legend, the judgment of Appius that Verginia was indeed a slave led to the downfall of the decemvirs.
- Aulus Verginius, tribunus plebis in 395 BC, together with his colleague, Quintus Pomponius Rufus, opposed a measure to establish a colony at Veii. Two years later, the tribunes were condemned and fined for their position.
- Aulus Verginius, one of the patrician Verginii; his daughter, Verginia, went over to the plebeians.
- Verginia A. f., a patrician by birth, married the plebeian Lucius Volumnius Flamma Violens, who was consul in 307 and 296 BC. She dedicated a chapel in which plebeian women could honor the goddess Pudicitia, after being excluded from her worship by the patricians on account of her marriage to a plebeian.
- Lucius Verginius, military tribune in 207 BC, during the Second Punic War. He brought the captured messengers of Hasdrubal to the consul, Gaius Claudius Nero.
- Verginius, according to Plutarchus, the tribunus plebis who accused Sulla in 87 BC; according to Cicero, his name was Marcus Vergilius.
- Verginius, an orator proscribed by the triumvirs in 43 BC; he escaped to Sicily by promising large sums of money to his slaves, and then to the soldiers who were sent to kill him.
- Verginius Capito, the master of a slave who escaped from the citadel at Tarracina during the war between Vitellius and Vespasian, in AD 69, and betrayed the citadel to Lucius Vitellius, the emperor's brother.
- Verginius Flavus, a rhetorician, who flourished during the first century AD; he was one of the teachers of Aulus Persius Flaccus.
- Lucius Verginius Rufus, consul in AD 63, 69, and 97; a general in Germania at the death of Nero, he three times refused the demand of his soldiers to claim the imperial dignity.
- Verginius Romanus, a contemporary of Pliny the Younger, was an author of comedies and mimi-iambi, which were much praised by Pliny.

== See also ==
- List of Roman gentes

== Bibliography ==
- T. Robert S. Broughton, The Magistrates of the Roman Republic, American Philological Association, 1951–1952.
- Robert Maxwell Ogilvie, Commentary on Livy, books 1–5, Oxford, Clarendon Press, 1965.
