= Titus Veturius Geminus Cicurinus (consul 494 BC) =

5th century BC Roman politician and general

- Office: Consul (494 BC)
- Children: Titus Veturius Geminus Cicurinus (consul 462 BC)

Titus Veturius Geminus Cicurinus (fl. c. 494 BC) was a Roman Republican patrician politician and general of the gens Veturia. He served as a Roman consul in 494 BC together with Aulus Verginius Tricostus Caeliomontanus.

== Family ==
Cicurinus seems to have been the name of two different family branches within the Veturia gens. They were respectively named Crassus Cicurinus and Geminus Cicurinus. Titus Veturius was probably the twin brother of Gaius Veturius Geminus Cicurinus who was consul in 499 BC.

His son, Titus Veturius Geminus Cicurinus, who was also named in the twin format, became consul in 462 BC.

== Consulship ==
During his consulship, Veturius and his colleague Verginius were faced with the popular unrest which led to a secession of the plebs. The two consuls brought the matter before the Roman Senate; however, the senators were critical of the consuls for not using their authority to prevent the growing sedition. The consuls were instructed to enrol the army levies from the populace; however, the people refused. The senate, beginning to realise the seriousness of the situation, debated the crisis and chose to appoint Manius Valerius Maximus as dictator.

A number of military threats emerged, and Verginius was assigned three legions to deal with the neighbouring Volsci who had taken up arms. Verginius successfully invaded and waged war against the Volsci, and captured the town of Velitrae in which a Roman colony was planted.

After the armies returned to Rome, the dictator resigned his office in disgust at the senate's unwillingness to reach a compromise with the people. Then, on the pretext of some renewed hostilities by the Aequi, the senate ordered the legions to be led out of the city. The people were outraged by this turn of events. In order to escape their military oath, the people contemplated murdering the consuls; however, it was observed that a criminal act could not absolve them of their oath which was holy in its nature. Shortly afterwards, the plebs seceded to the Mons Sacer, and the crisis continued into the following consular year.

== See also ==
- Veturia gens
- First secessio plebis

Political offices
Preceded by Appius Claudius Sabinus Regillensis; Publius Servilius Priscus Structus	Roman consul 494 BC with Aulus Verginius Tricostus Caeliomontanus	Succeeded by Postumus Cominius Auruncus; Spurius Cassius Vecellinus
