= Publius Servilius Priscus Structus (consul 495 BC) =

Roman statesman and senator who was consul in 495 BC

Consul of the Roman Republic
- In office 1 September 495 BC – 29 August 494 BC Serving with Appius Claudius Sabinus Regillensis
- Preceded by: Aulus Postumius Albus Regillensis, Titus Verginius Tricostus Caeliomontanus
- Succeeded by: Aulus Verginius Tricostus Caeliomontanus, Titus Veturius Geminus Cicurinus (consul 494 BC)

Personal details
- Born: Ancient Rome
- Died: Ancient Rome

Publius Servilius Priscus Structus was a Roman statesman who served as Senator and Consul.

== Consulship and military campaigns ==
Servilius was Roman consul in 495 BC, along with Appius Claudius Sabinus Regillensis, and was the first consul of gens Servilia.

During his consulship, Servilius successfully led Roman forces to victory against the invading Volsci, defeating them in battle a short distance from Rome, and then capturing and plundering the town of Suessa Pometia.

Later in 495 BC, Servilius led the Roman infantry to victory against an invading Sabine army, and subsequently he also defeated an army of the Aurunci near Ariccia.

== Roman domestic affairs ==
Immediately before and after the Volscian invasion, Servilius was involved in seeking to address complaints by the plebs who were angry at levels of debt being suffered by them. Livy says that, of the two consuls, Appius was of a more harsh disposition and Servilius more mild, such that Appius looked upon the plebeian situation with distaste and Servilius with sympathy.

In the debates in the senate, Servilius argued for relief from debt to be granted to the people. When the threat of the Volscian invasion became more immediate, the senate chose him because of his more mild disposition to take measures to ensure the enrolment of the army levies. Servilius proceeded to the assembly, and advised the people that the senate had been giving consideration to measures to alleviate the public concerns, but had been interrupted by news of the invasion. He exhorted the people to put aside their complaints momentarily to allow Rome united to face the common enemy. Further, he announced an edict that no Roman citizen should be detained, either in chains or in prison, from enrolling to fight, and that no soldier should, whilst serving in the army, have his goods seized or sold, nor his children or grandchildren arrested. Immediately the debtors who had been under arrest were released, and enrolled their names and, following them, crowds of the Roman people congregated in the forum to take the military oath. Immediately afterwards, Servilius led out the army to face the Volsci.

Upon the army's return to Rome, the class tensions were reignited when Servilius' colleague Appius issued decrees for even more serious penalties regarding debts. The senate sided with Appius and the people were angered at Servilius since his promises of debt relief prior to the war went unfulfilled. Servilius was thereby in effect politically isolated and disliked by all, and remained so for the balance of his consulate.

During these events, the consuls were unable to decide upon which of them should dedicate a new temple to Mercury. The senate referred the decision to the popular assembly, and also decreed that whichever consul was chosen should also exercise additional duties, including presiding over the markets, establish a merchants' guild, and exercise the functions of the pontifex maximus. The people, in order to spite the senate and the consuls, instead awarded the honour to the senior military officer of one of the legions named Marcus Laetorius.

In the following year Servilius was among the ten envoys sent by the senate to treat with the Plebs in which both parts came to an agreement which led to the ending of the first secessio plebis.

== Family ==
Servilius was the son of Publius Servilius Priscus Structus is himself considered the father of the future consul Servilius Spurius Priscus in 476 BC and the grandfather of future consul Publius Servilius Priscus in 463 BC. He might also have had a brother named Quintus Servilius Priscus Structus who was magister equitum in 494 BC under the dictator Manius Valerius Maximus.

== See also ==
- Servilia gens

Political offices
Preceded by Aulus Postumius Albus Regillensis, and Titus Verginius Tricostus Caeliomontanus	Consul of the Roman Republic; 495 BC with Appius Claudius Sabinus Regillensis	Succeeded by Aulus Verginius Tricostus Caeliomontanus, and Titus Verginius Tricostus Caeliomontanus
