= Caeliomontanus =

Ancient Roman cognomen

Caeliomontanus is an ancient Roman cognomen. Notable people with this cognomen include:

- Aulus Verginius Tricostus Caeliomontanus (consul 469 BC), Roman politician
- Aulus Verginius Tricostus Caeliomontanus (consul 494 BC), Roman politician
- Spurius Verginius Tricostus Caeliomontanus, Roman consul
- Titus Verginius Tricostus Caeliomontanus (consul 448 BC), Roman consul
- Titus Verginius Tricostus Caeliomontanus (consul 496 BC), Roman consul
