= Aulus Verginius Tricostus Caeliomontanus (consul 494 BC) =

5th century BC Roman politician and general

- Died: 486 BC?
- Office: Consul (494 BC)
- Children: Aulus Verginius Tricostus Caeliomontanus (consul 469 BC)

Aulus Verginius Tricostus Caeliomontanus (fl. c. 494–486 BC) was a Roman Republican politician and general of the gens Verginia. He served as a Roman consul in 494 BC together with Titus Veturius Geminus Cicurinus.

== Family origins ==
Caeliomontanus is the name of one of the families of the gens Verginia. Almost all the members of this branch of the family were named Tricostus and the Caeliomontanus name was without a doubt taken from the fact that the family originally came from the Caelian Hill. This would have distinguished this branch of the family from others in the same gens. He was probably the (younger) brother of Titus Verginius Tricostus Caeliomontanus, consul in 496 BC.

== Consulship ==
During his consulship, Verginius and his colleague Veturius were faced with the popular unrest which led to a secession of the plebs. The two consuls brought the matter before the Roman Senate; however, the senators were critical of the consuls for not using their authority to prevent the growing sedition. The consuls were instructed to enrol the army levies from the populace; however, the people refused. The senate, beginning to realise the seriousness of the situation, debated the crisis and chose to appoint Manius Valerius Maximus as dictator.

A number of military threats emerged, and Verginius was assigned three legions to deal with the neighbouring Volsci who had taken up arms. Verginius successfully invaded and waged war against the Volsci, and captured the town of Velitrae in which a Roman colony was planted.

After the armies returned to Rome, the dictator resigned his office in disgust at the senate's unwillingness to reach a compromise with the people. Then, on the pretext of some renewed hostilities by the Aequi, the senate ordered the legions to be led out of the city. The people were outraged by this turn of events. In order to escape their military oath, the people contemplated murdering the consuls; however, it was observed that a criminal act could not absolve them of their oath which was holy in its nature. Shortly afterwards, the plebs seceded to the Mons Sacer, and the crisis continued into the following consular year. In an attempt to solve the secession, the senate selected a group of ten envoys, among which Verginius was one, to treat with the leaders of the plebeians.

== Events of 486 BC ==
Aulus, or possibly his brother Titus, is listed by Festus, who in conjecture with the writings of Valerius Maximus, makes it possible that Verginius was one of the military tribunes in 486 BC who was burned at the Circus Maximus by Publius Mucius Scaevola for conspiring with the consul Spurius Cassius Vecellinus.

== See also ==
- List of Roman Republican consuls
- Roman Republic
- Verginia gens
- First secessio plebis

Political offices
| Preceded by Appius Claudius Sabinus Inregillensis; Publius Servilius Priscus Structus | Roman consul 494 BC with Titus Veturius Geminus Cicurinus | Succeeded by Postumus Cominius Auruncus; Spurius Cassius Vecellinus |
