= Lake Regillus =

Ancient lake in Latium

Coordinates: 41°50′25″N 12°41′35″E

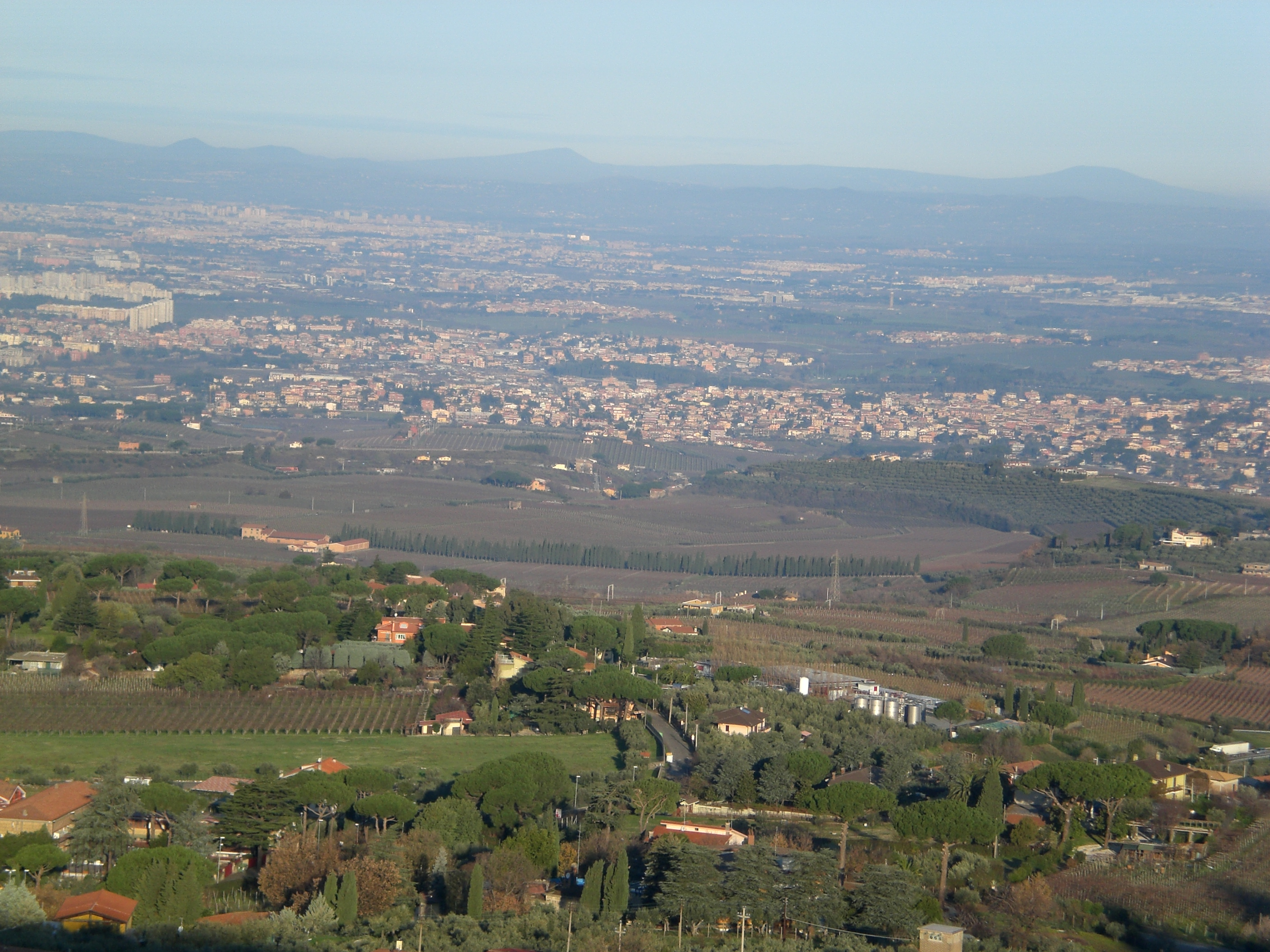
Prataporci site, where the battle took place, viewed from Monte Porzio Catone

Lake Regillus was an ancient lake of Latium, Italy, famous in the legendary history of Rome as the lake near which the Battle of Lake Regillus took place in 496 B.C. between the Romans and the Latins which finally decided the hegemony of Rome in Latium. The lake, now drained, was near the present-day town of Frascati.

During the battle, so the story runs, the Roman dictator Postumius vowed to build a temple to the twin gods Castor and Pollux, who were specially venerated in Tusculum, the chief city of the Latins (it being a Roman custom to invoke the aid of the gods of the enemy). The pair duly appeared during the battle dressed in white armour riding white horses, helped the Romans to prevail, and afterwards took the news of the victory to Rome. There they watered their horses at the spring of Juturna, close to which their temple in the Forum was subsequently erected.

There can be little doubt that Lake Regillus actually existed. Of the various identifications proposed, the best is that of Luigi Pareti, who locates the lake in a crater (Prataporci), which lies north of Frascati. The lake has since been drained by an emissarium of uncertain date. Most of the other sites proposed are not, as Regillus should be, within the limits of the territory of Tusculum.
