= Roman–Sabine wars =

6th & 5th century BC wars between Rome and the Sabines

The Roman–Sabine wars were a series of wars during the early expansion of ancient Rome in central Italy against their northern neighbours, the Sabines. It is commonly accepted that the events pre-dating the Roman Republic in 509 BC are semi-legendary in nature.

== Rape of the Sabine women ==
The so-called "Rape of the Sabine Women" was a legendary mass abduction or Bride kidnapping by Rome in the mid-8th century BC.

Following this, it is said that the Sabines and other tribes launched an invasion of Rome, which ended in peace and supposedly common rule of the two kingdoms between the Roman Romulus and the Sabine Titus Tatius.

== War with Tullus Hostilius ==
In the 7th century BC, during the reign of Rome's third king Tullus Hostilius, the Sabines and the Romans again warred. The pretexts for the war were, on the Roman side, that a number of Roman merchants had been seized by the Sabines at a market near the temple of Feronia, and on the Sabine side, that some of the Sabines were being detained at Rome. The Sabines sought and obtained the help of some volunteers from Veii, although the government of Veii did not come to their aid, holding faith to the peace treaty previously made with Romulus.

Tullus invaded Sabine territory and met the Sabines at the forest called Malitiosa ('Silva Malitiosa'). The Roman force was superior in both infantry and cavalry. In particular, the Roman cavalry had recently been augmented by the addition of ten new turmae of equites from among the Albans who now dwelt in Rome. The Romans won the battle after a cavalry charge threw the Sabines into disarray. The Sabines suffered heavy losses during the retreat.

== War with Ancus Marcius ==
According to the Fasti Triumphales, Rome's fourth king, Ancus Marcius celebrated a triumph for a victory over the Sabines and the Veientes in the seventh century BC.

== War with Tarquinius Priscus ==
In the early 6th century BC, during the reign of Rome's fifth king Lucius Tarquinius Priscus, the Sabines attacked Rome. Tarquinius had been preparing to construct a stone wall around Rome, however, the Sabines, having already crossed the Anio river, forced the king to abandon his plans and prepare for the attack. Livy reports that the initial engagement, though bloody, did not result in success for either side.

The Sabines withdrew to their camp, allowing the Romans time to levy additional troops. Tarquinius, believing Rome's military weakness lay in its lack of horsemen, doubled the number of the equites.

A second battle was then fought. The Romans, desiring to cut off the enemy's means of escape, sent rafts of burning logs down the Anio to destroy the bridge over the river by fire. In battle, the Sabine infantry pressed the Romans, and seemed to be winning against the Roman centre. However, the Roman horsemen flanked the Sabine infantry, routed them, and impeded their flight from the battle. Many of the Sabines were unable to escape with their lives, both because of the pursuit of the cavalry and also because of the destruction of the bridge. Some of the fleeing Sabines drowned in the Anio; their arms drifted down the river into the Tiber and past Rome, and the Romans recognised this as a sign of victory even before word of the outcome of the battle arrived in the city.

Tarquinius was determined to press his victory. He firstly piled up and burnt the spoils he had vowed to Vulcan, and he sent back to Rome the prisoners and booty he had captured. He then proceeded, with his army, into the Sabine territory. The Sabines hastily raised a fresh army, but were defeated again. They then sued for peace.

The Sabine town of Collatia, and its surrounding lands and population, was surrendered to become Roman territory. Livy records the wording of the form of surrender. Arruns Tarquinius, the king's nephew, was left there with a garrison, and Tarquinius returned to Rome to celebrate a triumph. According to the Fasti Triumphales, the date of the triumph was 13 September, 585 BC.

== War with Tarquinius Superbus ==
According to the Fasti Triumphales, Rome's last king, Tarquinius Superbus celebrated a triumph for a victory over the Sabines.

== War with the early republic 505–504 BC ==
The fall of the Roman monarchy left the Sabines in an ambiguous position politically with regard to Rome. Their treaties had been with the kings, but now the kings were gone.

According to the historian Dionysius of Halicarnassus, into this gap stepped Sextus Tarquinius (unless previously assassinated at Gabii), whose rape of Lucretia had been the event that triggered the revolution. He convinced the Sabines that they ought to help restore the kings. They moved against the Romans under native command and were quickly defeated. Sextus (or Superbus himself) arguing that the Sabine army was mismanaged now brought Fidenae and Cameria to the assistance of the Sabines, who were so impressed by his confidence, his allies and his analysis that they made him dictator and voted for all-out war on Rome.

Livy makes no reference to the involvement of a Tarquinius in this war. He says hostilities broke out between Rome and the Sabines in 505 BC. The Romans were victorious, and a triumph awarded to the consuls Marcus Valerius Volusus and Publius Postumius Tubertus. The triumphs are recorded on the Fasti Triumphales, albeit with some of the details lost.

In the following consular year hostilities increased. The consuls elected were Publius Valerius Poplicola (for a fourth time) and Titus Lucretius Tricipitinus (for a second). According to Livy, the threat of war with the Sabines led to the election of these experienced consuls.

According to Dionysius, the Sabines marched toward Rome and were stopped by the river Anio and presumably the consular troops south of it. They placed two camps, one near Fidenae and one in it. Of the consuls, Poplicola camped near the Sabines in the open, while Tricipitinus camped on a hill near Fidenae.

Both Livy and Dionysius agree that it was during this war that that Attius Clausus, later known as Appius Claudius Sabinus Regillensis, moved from Sabinum to Rome, together with all of his relatives and clients, including approximately 500 fighting men. The Romans made Claudius a member of the Roman Senate, and conferred citizenship on the Sabines together with land on the far side of the Anio. According to Dionysius, the Romans promised them land beyond the Anio River in the vicinity of Fidenae: all they had to do was to take it from the Fidenates. According to Livy, Claudius was part of the faction in Sabinum advocating peace with Rome, but when the war faction won out he fled from Regillum to Rome.

According to Dionysius the war with the Sabines was won as follows. Tarquin's plan was to launch a night attack on the camp of Valerius, filling in the ditch and scaling the wall. The troops in Fidenae would exit the city and cover these operations against a possible attack by Lucretius. However, a Sabine defector and prisoners brought in by a Roman cavalry patrol informed Valerius of the enemy plan. Lucretius was soon advised. The attack came after midnight. The Sabines were allowed to fill the ditch and throw up brushwood ramps over the wall into a camp that seemed all too still. In hindsight Tarquin might have guessed the danger from the lack of opposition to his inadvertently noisy operations and the total deficit of sentinels. He took those circumstances to mean that the Romans were all sound asleep, a striking underestimation of his enemy. The Roman maniples were in fact in formation and waiting in the intervallum around the inner perimeter of the castra, invisible in the total blackness. They could see enough to quietly kill all enemies who came over the wall. The moon suddenly rising, the Roman troops and the piles of slain were visible to the Sabines, whose reaction was to drop their weapons and run. As the ambush was no longer a surprise the Roman troops all shouted together, which was the prearranged signal to Lucretius's men on the hill. He sent out his cavalry, which drove the distracted Fidenates from their ambush. They were massacred by Lucretius' infantry coming up. The Sabine army dissolved into a rout of unarmed individuals. Of them 13500 were slain and 4200 taken captive. The battle was not over. Fidenae remained to be taken (see under Roman-Etruscan Wars).

Livy says simply that the consuls entered Sabinum, laid waste to the enemy territories, defeated them in battle, and returned to Rome in triumph. The Fasti triumphales only records one triumph, by the consul Valerius, being held in May, 504 BC, for victories over both the Sabines and the Veientes.

== War in 503 BC ==
According to the Fasti Trimphales, the consul Publius Postumius Tubertus celebrated an ovation for a victory over the Sabines on 3 April 503 BC, and on the following day his colleague Agrippa Menenius Lanatus celebrated a triumph, also for a victory over the Sabines.

== Bloodless war, 501 BC ==
Livy reports that in 501 BC a scuffle occurred in Rome caused by a group of Sabine youths who, during the celebration of games in Rome, attempted to abduct a number of courtesans. Because also of the fear of a war with the Latins, Titus Larcius was made dictator. The Sabine ambassadors treated for peace, but the Romans refused, pointing to the continuous wars against Rome by the Sabines, and demanding that the Sabines pay restitution to Rome for the costs of the war. The Sabines refused, and war was declared, however it appears that no battle ensued.

== The one-day war, 495 BC ==
In 495 BC a Sabine army marched into Roman territory, advancing as far as the river Anio, and plundering the rural areas. Word of the invasion arrived at Rome, and immediately Aulus Postumius Albus Regillensis, the former dictator, led the cavalry to meet the enemy, and the consul Publius Servilius Priscus Structus departed shortly afterwards with the infantry. The Roman cavalry rounded up the Sabine stragglers, and the Sabine army gave no resistance to the Roman infantry upon its arrival. The invasion was defeated on the same day that word of it reached Rome.

== Engagement in 494 BC ==
During the period of popular discontent in Rome which led to the First secessio plebis in 494 BC, each of the Volsci, Sabines and the Aequi took up arms at the same time. To meet the threat, a Roman dictator was appointed, Manius Valerius Maximus. Ten legions were raised, a greater number than had been raised previously at any one time, four of which were assigned to the dictator to deal with the Sabines who were regarded as the most serious of the three military threats.

The dictator marched with his army to meet the Sabines, although the location of the battle is unclear. The Sabine army was drawn up in such a wide formation that the centre was too weak. The dictator exploited this by a cavalry charge through the centre of the Sabines, followed up by an attack of the infantry. The Sabines were routed, and fled. The Romans captured the Sabine camp, and claimed victory in the war. The victory is said to have been so significant that it was only exceeded at this time by the battle of Lake Regillus in its renown.

The dictator Valerius returned to Rome and celebrated a triumph. Additionally, a Curule seat was allocated in the Circus Maximus to Valerius and his descendants from where they could watch the ludi.

== Veii-Sabine alliance 475 BC ==
In 475 BC the Veientes together with Sabines commenced hostilities against Rome, only a year after the defeat of Veii in a previous war.

The consul Publius Valerius Poplicola was assigned the conduct of the war. The Roman army was reinforced by auxiliaries from the Latin allies and the Hernici.

The Sabine army was camped outside the walls of Veii. The Roman army attacked the Sabine defences. The Sabines sallied forth from their camp, but the Romans had the better of the fighting, and took the gate of the Sabine camp. The forces of Veii then attacked from the city, but in some disorder, and a Roman cavalry charged routed the Veientes, giving Rome the overall victory.

Valerius was awarded a triumph for the victory, which he celebrated on 1 May.

== Conflict in 470–468 BC ==
In 470 BC the consul Tiberius Aemilius was given command of the Roman forces against the Sabines. It is unclear how this conflict started. The Sabines confined themselves to their camp and would not engage the Roman army. Aemilius laid waste the Sabine countryside, and also the villages, prompting the Sabines to come forth to stop him. An uncertain battle was fought, and both sides retreated.

In the following year the Roman consuls Titus Numicius Priscus and Aulus Verginius Tricostus Caeliomontanus and their armies were sent against the Volsci and the Aequi respectively. Meanwhile the Sabines ravaged Roman territory even up to the city gates, but then were attacked and defeated by the Roman armies returning from their campaigns.

In 468 BC the conflict continued into a third year. The Sabines marched through the territory of the Latin town of Crustumerium, ravaging the countryside. They progressed along the banks of the river Anio and came up to the Colline gate of Rome, then took off much bounty. The Roman army led by the consul Quintus Servilius Priscus Structus pursued the Sabines, and ravaged greater bounty from the Sabine lands. There was no major engagement between the opposing armies, however the war seems to have abated at this time.
