= Laetoria gens =

Ancient Roman family

The gens Laetoria was a plebeian family at ancient Rome. Its members appear regularly throughout the history of the Republic. None of the Laetorii ever obtained the consulship, but several achieved lesser offices of the Roman state.

== Praenomina ==
The only praenomina found among the Laetorii mentioned by the ancient historians are Marcus, Gaius, and Lucius, the three most common names at all periods of Roman history. Some sources mention a Gnaeus Laetorius, but in other sources his praenomen is Gaius.

== Branches and cognomina ==
The Laetorii of the Republic do not appear to have been divided into families, and the only surnames found are Mergus, a seagull, and Plancianus, apparently derived from the nomen of the Plancia gens, and perhaps indicating that the bearer was a descendant of that family, who was adopted by one of the Laetorii.

== Members ==
- Marcus Laetorius, a centurion primi pili, described in history as the first plebeian magistrate, in 495 BC, the year before the first secession of the plebs. Chosen to establish a collegium mercatorum (merchants' guild), dedicate the Temple of Mercury, and superintend the corn market, he was probably plebeian aedile, although according to tradition this office was established along with that of tribune of the plebs, in order to negotiate an end to the secession. (Note: According to Livy, Laetorius was chosen by the popular assembly after the consuls could not agree on which of them should dedicate the new Temple of Mercury; the Senate was outraged by the election of a plebeian to perform these functions, but powerless to prevent it. Münzer suggests that he was not plebeian aedile, but decemvir sacris faciundis.) Some scholars have argued that he dedicated the Temple of Mercury as one of the Decemviri Sacris Faciundis.
- Gaius Laetorius, tribune of the plebs in BC 471, the year in which the lex Publilia passed the election of the tribunes to the comitia tributa, freeing the office from the direct influence of the patricians. The success of the rogation was due in no small part to the courage and energy of Laetorius.
- Marcus Laetorius Mergus, military tribune during the Third Samnite War, was accused of adultery by the tribune Cominius. He took his own life, but was tried and sentenced after his death.
- Marcus Laetorius M. f. M. n. Plancianus, magister equitum to the dictator Quintus Ogulnius Gallus, appointed to hold the Latin Games in 257 BC.
- Gaius Laetorius, curule aedile, the Senate's envoy to the consuls Appius Claudius Pulcher and Quintus Fulvius Flaccus in 212 BC, during the Second Punic War. He was praetor in 210, and decemvir sacris faciundis in 209.
- Lucius Laetorius, plebeian aedile in 202 BC, together with his colleague, Publius Aelius Tubero, celebrated the Epulum Jovis and Plebeian Games, but abdicated when their election was declared void ab initio for religious reasons.
- Gaius Laetorius, (Note: Gnaeus Laetorius in some manuscripts. Broughton considers him the same as the praetor of 210 BC.) legate of the praetor Lucius Furius Purpureo against the Gauls, BC 200.
- Laetorius, (Note: Licinnius in Plutarch.) a friend of Gaius Gracchus, who attempted to stop Gracchus' pursuers from crossing a wooden bridge; but when he was unable to prevent their pursuit, took his own life.
- Marcus Laetorius, a senator allied with Gaius Marius, was proscribed by Sulla when he entered Rome in 88 BC, but escaped, and subsequently returned with Marius.

== See also ==
- List of Roman gentes

== Bibliography ==
- Titus Livius (Livy), Ab Urbe Condita (History of Rome).
- Dionysius of Halicarnassus, Romaike Archaiologia.
- Plutarchus, Lives of the Noble Greeks and Romans.
- Suda.
- Valerius Maximus, Factorum ac Dictorum Memorabilium (Memorable Facts and Sayings).
- Appianus Alexandrinus (Appian), Bellum Civile (The Civil War).
- Friedrich Münzer, Römische Adelsparteien und Adelsfamilien, Stuttgart, 1920.
- T. Robert S. Broughton, The Magistrates of the Roman Republic, American Philological Association (1952).
- John C. Traupman, The New College Latin & English Dictionary, Bantam Books, New York (1995).
