= First secessio plebis =

Political event in early Rome (495–493 BC)

The first secessio plebis was a significant event in ancient Roman political and social history that occurred between 495 and 493 BC. It involved a dispute between the patrician ruling class and the plebeian underclass, and was one of a number of secessions by the plebs and part of a broader political conflict known as the conflict of the orders.

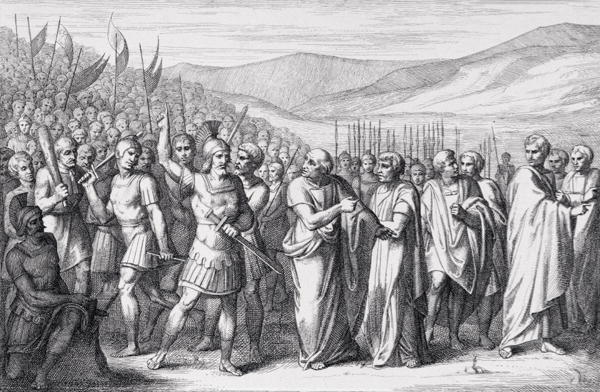
The Secession of the People to the Mons Sacer, engraving by Bartolomeo Barloccini, 1849.

The secession was initially sparked by discontent about the burden of debt on the poorer plebeian class. The failure of the patrician rulers, including the consuls and more generally the Senate, to address those complaints and, subsequently, the Senate's outright refusal to agree to debt reforms, caused the issue to flare into a more widespread concern about plebeian rights. As a result, the plebeians seceded and departed to the nearby Mons Sacer (the Sacred Mountain).

Ultimately, a reconciliation was negotiated and the plebs were given political representation by the creation of the office of the tribune of the plebs.

== Background ==
The last king of Rome had been expelled in 509 BC and the Roman Republic had been established. In the place of the kings, the city-state was governed by two consuls, elected annually and serving in office for twelve months. Other government institutions included the senate and various assemblies of the people.

At this time, the consuls were elected from amongst the patricians, who were the upper class in Rome. Likewise the Senate was composed only of patricians. The consuls and the senate together exercised the executive and majority of the legislative functions in Rome. The patricians therefore possessed most of the political powers, and were also generally wealthier. The plebeians on the other hand were the majority of the population, and also made up the majority of soldiers serving in the Roman army.

== Prelude ==
In 495 BC, shortly after the significant Roman victory over the Latins at the Battle of Lake Regillus, rumours had reached Rome of the threat of war from the Volsci. A Roman army under the consul Publius Servilius Priscus Structus entered and then returned from the Volscian lands, seemingly having averted war without shedding any blood.

Upon the army's return from war, the people of Rome began to complain about the terrors to which they were subject on account of debt. Debtors, they complained, were being imprisoned and beaten by certain money-lenders. Roman historian Livy records that a former army officer, now advanced in years, threw himself into the Forum. His clothes were dirty, his body pale and thin, and he bore also a long beard and hair which gave him an impression of wildness. He was recognised by the people, and they recalled the honours he had achieved in battle, and he displayed his battle-scars. Then he told them how he had come to such a state: that whilst serving in war against the Sabines the enemy had ravaged his rural property, burnt his house, pillaged his possessions and stolen his cattle. Furthermore, a tax had then been imposed on him, and he had borrowed money to pay the tax, but due to usury he had been forced to give up his grandfather's farm, then his father's, and then another final property. When he was able to pay no more, he had been taken by the creditors into a prison and threatened with death. He then displayed the whip-marks upon his back. The people were outraged, and uproar spread throughout Rome. Debtors from around the city hurried into the streets and implored the people for protection, and a great crowd gathered in the forum.

The consuls Servilius and Appius Claudius Sabinus Regillensis attended the Forum, and the people demanded that the Senate be convened. However, so many senators refused to attend out of fear that there were too few of them to come to any decision. The people became suspicious that their demands were being stymied, and violence was so close to breaking out that the senators felt compelled to act, and they eventually convened in the Senate house. Nevertheless the Senate remained struck by indecision. One of the consuls, Appius, because of his harsh temper, called for the uprising to be quelled by the authority of the consuls. The other consul, Servilius, who was of a more mild disposition, called for some concession to be granted to the populace to convince them to retire from the Forum.

== First interlude ==
A number of foreign disturbances now intervened. Some Latin horsemen arrived in Rome to announce that a Volscian army had invaded their territories, and requested Roman assistance. The Roman people refused to enroll as soldiers on account of their outstanding complaints. The Senate, dejected, sent the consul Servilius to attempt to break the impasse. Servilius proceeded to the assembly, and advised the people that the Senate had been giving consideration to measures to alleviate the public concerns, but had been interrupted by news of the invasion. He exhorted the people to put aside their complaints momentarily to allow Rome united to face the common enemy. Further, he announced an edict that no Roman citizen should be detained, either in chains or in prison, from enrolling to fight, and that no soldier should, whilst serving in the army, have his goods seized or sold, nor his children or grandchildren arrested. Immediately the debtors who had been under arrest were released, and enrolled their names and, following them, crowds of the Roman people congregated in the Forum to take the military oath. Immediately afterwards, Servilius led out the army to face the Volsci. The Volsci initially sought to take advantage of the Roman divisions by making an attempt on the Roman camp in the night in order to elicit some treachery or desertions; however, the Romans remained united, and on the following day the Volsci were defeated and the town of Suessa Pometia plundered.

There were further military engagements against the Sabines, in which the Roman cavalry led by Aulus Postumius Albus Regillensis and the infantry led by Servilius achieved a speedy victory, and against the Aurunci in which the Romans again led by Servilius achieved the victory.

== Tensions increase ==
The troops returned to Rome, and the people anticipated the consuls and the Senate taking steps to address the popular concerns relating to debt. However, the situation was inflamed by the consul Appius who acted contrary to popular expectations by issuing severe decrees regarding debt, with the effect that debtors who had previously been released from imprisonment were delivered back to their creditors, and further persons were taken into custody. A soldier to whom the new decree applied made appeals to the other consul Servilius, and a crowd gathered to remind Servilius of his previous promises, and also of the people's service in war, and called upon him to bring the matter before the Senate. But the mood of the patricians was in favour of the approach of Appius, and so Servilius was left in a position where he could take no steps to intervene on behalf of the people, and earned the disfavour of both factions as a result: the senators thought him weak and a populist, whereas the people thought he had betrayed their trust.

Meanwhile the consuls were unable to decide upon which of them should dedicate a new temple to Mercury. The Senate referred the decision to the popular assembly, and also decreed that whichever consul was chosen should also exercise additional duties, including presiding over the markets, establishing a merchants' guild, and exercising the functions of the pontifex maximus. The people, in order to spite the Senate and the consuls, instead awarded the honour to the senior military officer of one of the legions named Marcus Laetorius.

The Senate was outraged at this turn of events, as was one of the consuls in particular. However, the people were not restrained. Upon seeing a debtor being led to the courts, a mob formed and violence erupted. The crowd protected the debtors and turned instead upon the creditors. The consul's decrees were barely heard, and ignored, and the creditors were harassed within sight of one of the consuls.

Hostilities with the Sabines now led to a decree from the Senate for enrolment of the army levies. However, the decree was ignored, and nobody enlisted. Appius was incensed. He blamed Servilius and said that Servilius, by his silence had betrayed the Republic by failing to pass sentence upon the debtors and to enrol the army levies. Appius vowed that by himself he would uphold the Republic, and the dignity of his office and of the Senate. He sought to intervene by ordering the arrest of one of the ringleaders of the sedition. The lictors seized the man and sought to carry him away; however, he sought to exercise his right of appeal to the people. Appius sought to prevent the appeal, but was convinced otherwise by the leading men. This impasse, and an increased level of sedition and secret meetings, continued until the conclusion of the consuls' term of office.

Beginning in March 494 BC, the elected consuls were Aulus Verginius Tricostus Caeliomontanus and Titus Veturius Geminus Cicurinus. Meanwhile the people held regular nightly meetings, sometimes on the Esquiline Hill and other times upon the Aventine Hill. The consuls got wind of these meetings, and put the matter before the Senate. However the Senate was so outraged that the consuls had not used the authority of their office to prevent these meetings that it was not at first possible to hold any vote. The senators rebuked the consuls for failing to act, and the consuls enquired as to the will of the Senate. In response, the Senate decreed that the army levies should be enrolled as quickly as possible, in order to distract the people from their sedition.

The consuls therefore ascended the rostra, and summoned young men by name to enlist. None responded. Instead, a crowd of the people gathered, and told the consul that nobody would do so until the public rights and liberties were restored. The consuls were at a loss, and fearing some great disturbance if the issue were pressed, instead returned to the Senate for further guidance. Upon their return, the younger senators were highly critical of the consuls for what they said was a lack of courage, and called on them to resign. But the consuls told the Senate that the disturbances were more serious and more advanced than the Senate realised, and invited the senators to attend the forum to observe the difficulties faced by the consuls in enrolling the levies. The consuls, accompanied by some senators, then returned to the rostra, and again called for the enlistment of one man who, the consuls knew, was most unwilling to agree. The man, surrounded by his supporters, did not respond. The consuls sent a lictor to seize the man, but the man's supporters threw the lictor back. The senators, shocked at this, tried to help, but were also pushed away, and a greater disturbance was only averted by the timely intervention of the consuls.

The Senate was then recalled. Those senators who had been involved in the incident called for a criminal inquiry, and there was a great deal of tumult and shouting particularly amongst the most extreme elements of the Senate. The consuls upbraided them for being as unruly as the people in the forum, and a vote was held. Three propositions were considered. The consul of the previous year, Appius Claudius, said that the people's licentiousness and lack of fear of the consequences of their behaviour came from their right of appeal to the popular assembly. He called for the appointment of a dictator from whom no appeal could be made. On the other hand Titus Larcius advocated that measures should be put in place for the relief of the debt issues which had given rise to the people's complaints. As a middle ground, another senator Publius Virginius (it is unclear whether he was related to the consul) proposed that the relief suggested by Larcius should only be extended to those persons who served in the army in the recent wars against the Aurunci and the Sabines. The suggestion of Appius was supported by a majority, and although Appius himself was almost chosen as dictator, instead the Senate chose a man of more moderate temper, Manius Valerius Maximus.

Valerius was the brother of Publius Valerius Publicola who held the agnomen 'Publicola' ('friend of the people') because after the overthrow of the monarchy he had, as consul, instituted the right of appeal to the people's assembly. As a result, the people did not fear being subjected to any harsh treatment from the dictator Valerius.

== Second interlude ==
Shortly after his appointment, with the threat of war looming from a number of foreign enemies, the Aequi, Sabines and the Volsci, Valerius issued an edict in relation to debt which was in effect similar to that which had been issued by Servilius in the previous year, and the people were convinced to enlist in the army. Ten legions were raised, a greater number than had ever been raised previously. Three were assigned to each of the consuls, and the dictator took four legions to deal with the greatest threat which was posed by the Sabines.

The consul Verginius led his legions against the Volsci. He defeated the Volscian army, and pursued the enemy to Velitrae where the Volscian army was slaughtered. The lands of Velitrae were seized for Rome. The dictator led his troops against the Sabine army and won a great victory, only exceeded at this time by the battle of Lake Regillus in its renown, and celebrated a triumph as a result. Meanwhile the consul Veturius took his legions into Latin territory to deal with the marauding Aequi. However, the Aequi fled to the safety of the mountains. The consul pursued them, but found the Aequi camped on a strategically advantageous site which was difficult to approach. He proposed to wait; however, his troops complained that they desired to return to Rome because of the ongoing political and social unrest, and forced the consul to launch an attack. The boldness of the attack was such that the Aequi were frightened into flight from their camp, and the Romans thereby achieved a victory without shedding blood, and with the capture of much booty in the Aequian camp.

== Climax and secession ==
The armies returned to Rome. The dictator, determined to deal with the outstanding problem of debt, asked the Senate to address the problem, but the Senate refused. The dictator, frustrated, then harangued the Senate for its obstinacy and its opposition to concord. He refused to remain dictator whilst the Senate refused to act, and therefore resigned from office. As he returned to his home, the people applauded him for his efforts.

The Senate was then compelled by fear of further sedition to take some action. Accordingly, on the pretext of some renewed hostilities by the Aequi, the Senate ordered the legions to be led out of the city. The people were outraged by this turn of events. In order to avoid their military oath, the people contemplated murdering the consuls, however it was observed that a criminal act could not absolve them of their oath which was holy in its nature.

One plebeian, Lucius Sicinius Vellutus, proposed that the people should leave the city en masse and go to Mons Sacer, the Sacred Mountain, three miles from the city beyond the river Anio. The people followed his advice. Livy records another version set out in the history of Piso that the people instead proceeded to the Aventine Hill, however Livy doubts Piso's version on the basis that the Mons Sacer is preferred by the majority of historians. When they arrived they set up camp and fortified it with ramparts and trenches and waited there for a number of days.

== Reconciliation and reform ==
The Senate, fearing what might come next, was finally spurred to negotiate with the plebeians. They sent the former consul Agrippa Menenius Lanatus as an envoy, on account of his eloquence and also because of his popularity which was due, Livy says, to his being descended from plebeians (although precisely what is meant by this is unclear).

When he arrived, Menenius told the plebeians a fable about the necessity of all the parts of the body to work together, because all parts depend upon each other for their own success and survival. This impressed upon them the importance of each part of the Roman Republic to each other part, and the need for a reconciliation. At the request of Menenius the plebeians sent three envoys to conclude a treaty with the Senate; Marcus Decius, Spurius Icilius and Lucius Junius Brutus.

The resolution that was agreed to provided for the appointment of a new class of magistrates, called tribunes, elected from amongst the plebeians and designed to represent their interests against the power of the patrician consuls. There were initially five tribunes selected (Livy says initially two were chosen, and those two selected an additional three). They included Lucius Albinius Paterculus, Gaius Licinius, and Lucius Sicinius Vellutus (who had led the people to the Mons Sacer) and the plebeian envoy Lucius Junius Brutus. Additionally, the person of a tribune was made sacrosanct, so that any person who harmed them was subject to punishment by death.

Other traditions ascribe the Senate sending a group of ten envoys, all consular with the exception of one, to negotiate with the plebeians. This group is sometimes described as led by Menenius or in some accounts by the former dictator Manius Valerius Maximus. This group of ten consisted of: Agrippa Menenius Lanatus (consul 503 BC), Manius Valerius Maximus (dictator 494 BC), Publius Servilius Proscus Structus (consul 495 BC), Publius Postumius Tubertus (consul 505 & 503 BC), Titus Aebutius Helva (consul 499 BC), Servius Sulpicius Camerinus Cornutus (consul 500 BC), Aulus Postumius Albus Regillensis (consul 496), Aulus Verginius Tricostus Caeliomontanus (consul 494 BC), Titus Lartius Flavus (consul 501 & 498 BC) and a tenth member who remains unknown.

== Aftermath ==
Livy reports that there was famine in Rome in 492 BC, which came about because the plebeian farmers had not sown their crops during the secession. The consuls arranged for the import of grain from Etruria to address the shortage. An even greater amount of grain was imported the following year from Sicily, and the question of how it should be distributed amongst the Roman citizens, together with tensions arising from the secession, led to the exile and defection of Gaius Marcius Coriolanus after he unsuccessfully advocated the reversal of the reforms which arose from the secession, including the creation of the office of the tribunes.

== Bibliography ==
- Livy, Ab urbe condita, Book 2
