= Titus Verginius Tricostus Caeliomontanus (consul 496 BC) =

Roman politician, consul in 496 BC

Consul of the Roman Republic
- In office 1 September 496 BC – 29 August 495 BC Serving with Aulus Postumius Albus Regillensis
- Preceded by: Aulus Sempronius Atratinus, Marcus Minucius Augurinus
- Succeeded by: Appius Claudius Sabinus Regillensis, Publius Servilius Priscus Structus

Personal details
- Born: Unknown; Ancient Rome
- Died: 486 BC? Ancient Rome

Titus Verginius Tricostus Caeliomontanus was a Roman statesman who served as Consul in 496 BC. He was probably the (older) brother of Aulus Verginius Tricostus Caeliomontanus, consul in 494 BC.

== Consulship and military campaigns ==
Titus Verginius Tricostus Caeliomontanus was the Roman consul in 496 BC, along with Aulus Postumius Albus Regillensis. Livy reported that it was the year of the Battle of Lake Regillus; Aulus Postumius Albus had abdicated his consulship and was named dictator. Dionysius of Halicarnassus reported that Titus Virginius had commanded a corps under the orders of the dictator at the Battle of Lake Regillus.

== Events of 486 BC ==
Titus, or possibly his brother Aulus, was listed by Festus, who in conjecture with the writings of Valerius Maximus, made it possible that Verginius was one of the military tribunes in 486 BC who was burned at the Circus Maximus by Publius Mucius Scaevola for conspiring with the consul Spurius Cassius Vecellinus.

== Notes ==
Political offices
Preceded by Aulus Sempronius Atratinus and Marcus Minucius Augurinus	Consul of the Roman Republic; 496 BC with Aulus Postumius Albus Regillensis	Succeeded by Appius Claudius Sabinus Regillensis and Publius Servilius Priscus Structus
