= Aulus Postumius Albus Regillensis (consul 496 BC) =

Early 5th century BC Roman dictator and consul

Aulus Postumius Albus
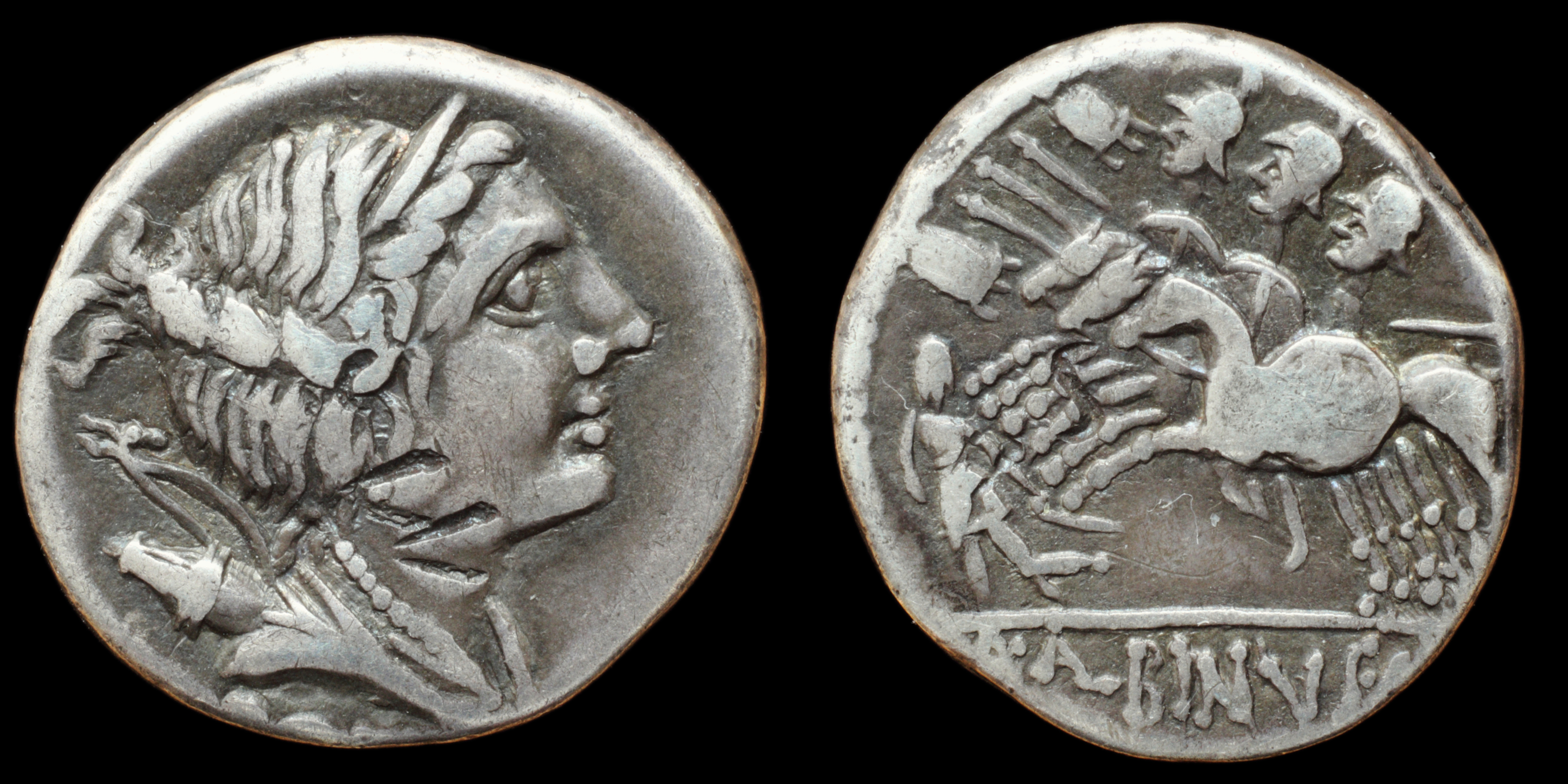
- Denarius commemorating Postumius's victory: three horsemen trample a foot-soldier, with a head of Diana on the obverse, minted in 96 BC by a descendant of the dictator

Consul of the Roman Republic
- In office 1 September 496 BC – 29 August 495 BC Serving with Titus Verginius Tricostus Caeliomontanus
- Preceded by: Aulus Sempronius Atratinus, Marcus Minucius Augurinus
- Succeeded by: Appius Claudius Sabinus Regillensis, Publius Servilius Priscus Structus

Dictator of the Roman Republic
- In office 496 BC – 495 BC
- Preceded by: Titus Larcius
- Succeeded by: Manius Valerius Maximus

Personal details
- Born: Unknown Rome
- Died: Unknown Rome

Aulus Postumius Albus Regillensis was an ancient Roman who, according to Livy, was Roman dictator in 498 or 496 BC, when he conquered the Latins in the great Battle of Lake Regillus and subsequently celebrated a triumph. Many of the coins of the Postumii Albi commemorate this victory of their ancestor, as in the one pictured. Roman folklore related that Castor and Pollux were seen fighting in this battle on the side of the Romans, whence the dictator afterwards promised a temple to Castor and Pollux in the Roman Forum.

He was consul in 496 BC, in which year some of the annals, according to Livy, placed the battle of Lake Regillus; and it is to this year that Dionysius assigns it. The name "Regillensis" is usually supposed to have been derived from this battle; but Niebuhr thinks that it was taken from a place of residence, just as the Claudii bore the same name, and that the later annalists only spoke of Postumius as commander in consequence of the name. Livy states expressly that Scipio Africanus was the first Roman who obtained a surname from his conquests. In 495 BC, Postumius was chosen at short notice by the Romans to lead the cavalry to victory against a Sabine invading force. In 493 BC Postumius was one of the ten envoys sent by the senate to treat with the plebeian leaders during the first secessio plebis.

Postumius' career prior to his consulship and dictatorship is not known, but he might have been the military tribune who is mentioned in 504 BC serving under the consul Publius Valerius Poplicola.

He was, according to some genealogies, the father of Spurius Postumius Albus Regillensis and Aulus Postumius Albus Regillensis.

== See also ==
- Postumia gens

Political offices
Preceded by Aulus Sempronius Atratinus and Marcus Minucius Augurinus	Consul of the Roman Republic; 496 BC with Titus Verginius Tricostus Caeliomontanus	Succeeded by Appius Claudius Sabinus Regillensis and Publius Servilius Priscus Structus
