= Regillum =

Regillum (also called Inregillum, Regilli, and Regillus) was a town in ancient Sabinum, north of Rome, known chiefly as the original home of Appius Claudius Sabinus Regillensis. The precise location of Regillum is unknown.

According to tradition, during the early years of the Roman Republic, the Sabines were debating whether to declare war against Rome. One of the leading members of the faction urging peace was Attius Clausus, a wealthy merchant of Regillum. In 504 BC, as the majority of the Sabines seemed ready to vote for war, Clausus and his retainers migrated to Rome, where they were warmly received. Clausus, who took the Latin name "Appius Claudius", was admitted to the patriciate, and given a seat in the Roman Senate. His followers, numbering some five hundred men capable of bearing arms, were granted land north of the Anio, where they later formed the basis of the tribus Claudia. For centuries, Claudius' descendants were among the most powerful and influential of all Roman families.

Years later, Claudius' son, Gaius Claudius Sabinus Regillensis, who had been consul in 460 BC, is said to have retired to Regillum after failing to dissuade his nephew, Appius, the decemvir, from abusing the power of the Roman state; but he returned to defend Appius when the latter was impeached, and afterward remained at Rome.

== Bibliography ==
- Titus Livius (Livy), Ab Urbe Condita (History of Rome).
- Gaius Suetonius Tranquillus, De Vita Caesarum (Lives of the Caesars, or The Twelve Caesars).
- Dionysius of Halicarnassus, Romaike Archaiologia.
- "Appius Claudius Sabinus Regillensis" (no. 1) in the Dictionary of Greek and Roman Biography and Mythology, William Smith, ed., Little, Brown and Company, Boston (1849).
