= Gens =

Family in ancient Rome, signified by a person's nomen

In ancient Rome, a gens (/ɡɛns/ or /dʒɛnz/, Latin: [gẽːs]; pl.: gentes [ˈgɛnteːs]) was a family consisting of individuals who shared the same nomen gentilicium and who claimed descent from a common ancestor. A branch of a gens, sometimes identified by a distinct cognomen, was called a stirps (pl.: stirpes). For example, in the name Marcus Tullius Cicero, Tullius is the nomen gentilicium, which identifies Cicero as a member of the Tullia gens, while the surname Cicero identifies the branch of the gens to which he belonged.

The gens was an important social structure at Rome and throughout Italy during the period of the Roman Republic. Much of individuals' social standing depended on the gens to which they belonged. Certain gentes were classified as patrician, others as plebeian; some had both patrician and plebeian branches. The importance of the gens as a social structure declined considerably in imperial times, although the gentilicium continued to define the origins and dynasties of the ancient Romans, including the emperors.

== Origins ==
The word gens is sometimes translated as "race", or "nation", meaning a people descended from a common ancestor. It can also be translated as "clan", "kin", or "tribe", although the word tribus has a separate and distinct meaning in Roman culture. A gens could be as small as a single family, or could include hundreds of individuals. According to tradition, in 479 BC the Fabia gens alone were able to field a militia consisting of three hundred and six men of fighting age. The concept of the gens was not uniquely Roman, but was shared with communities throughout Italy, including those who spoke Italic languages such as Latin, Oscan, and Umbrian as well as the Etruscans, whose language was unrelated. All of these peoples were eventually absorbed into the sphere of Roman culture.

The oldest gentes were said to have originated before the founding of Rome, which most Greek and Roman writers placed in the mid-eighth century BC, and some claimed descent from mythological personages as far back as the time of the Trojan War. However, the establishment of the gens cannot long predate the adoption of hereditary surnames. The nomen gentilicium, or "gentile name", was its distinguishing feature, for a Roman citizen's nomen indicated his membership in a gens.

The nomen could be derived from any number of things, such as the name of an ancestor, a person's occupation, physical appearance, character, or town of origin, often having been first acquired as cognomina. Because some of these things were fairly common, it was possible for unrelated families to bear the same nomen, and over time to become confused.

Persons could be adopted into a gens and acquire its nomen. A libertus, or "freedman", usually assumed the nomen (and sometimes also the praenomen) of the person who had manumitted him, and a naturalized citizen usually took the name of the patron who granted his citizenship. Freedmen and newly enfranchised citizens were not technically part of the gentes whose names they shared, but within a few generations it often became impossible to distinguish their descendants from the original members. In practice this meant that a gens could acquire new members and even new branches, either by design or by accident.

== Praenomina and cognomina ==
Within a gens, individuals could be distinguished by their personal names, or praenomina, by their surnames, or cognomina, or by a combination of these names. For instance, Cicero's father and son were both named Marcus, while his uncle bore the praenomen Lucius, and his brother Quintus. All were part of the same stirps, and bore the surname Cicero, but more distant relatives bore different cognomina, such as Marcus Tullius Decula, or had no surname at all, as Sextus Tullius. Roman women received their fathers' nomina in their feminine form; Cicero's daughter was named Tullia. They might use additional names when necessary to distinguish them from other women belonging to the same gens. In imperial times, surnames came to serve this function for both men and women.

=== Praenomina within gentes ===
In the time of the Republic, it was customary for each son in a family to receive a different praenomen that could be used to distinguish him from his brothers. Most gentes regularly employed a limited number of praenomina. The most conservative gentes would sometimes limit themselves to three or four praenomina, such as the Julii, who relied almost exclusively on Lucius, Sextus, and Gaius, while others made regular use of six or seven, such as the Cornelii, who regularly used Publius, Gnaeus, Lucius, Servius, Marcus, and Aulus. Different branches of a gens might vary in their names of choice; for instance the Cornelii Cossi used primarily Aulus, Publius, and Gnaeus, while the Cornelii Scipiones used mainly Publius, Lucius, and Gnaeus; the Cornelii Cethegi used several of the traditional names of the Cornelia gens, to which they added Gaius.

There were two main reasons for this limited selection: first, it was traditional to pass down family names from one generation to the next; such names were always preferred. Second, most patrician families limited themselves to a small number of names as a way of distinguishing themselves from the plebeians, who often employed a wider variety of names, including some that were seldom used by the patricians. However, several of the oldest and most noble patrician houses frequently used rare and unusual praenomina. The Furii and Menenii used Agrippa, the Verginii Opiter and Proculus, the Fabii and Quinctii Caeso, and the Fabii were the only patrician family to make regular use of Numerius, while beginning in the late Republic, the Cornelii Sullae repeatedly used Faustus.

Certain families also deliberately avoided particular praenomina. In at least some cases, this was because of traditions concerning disgraced or dishonoured members of the gens bearing a particular name. For example, the Junia gens avoided the praenomina Titus and Tiberius after two members with these names were executed for treason. Similar instances supposedly led the assembly of the Manlia gens to forbid its members from bearing the praenomen Marcus, and caused the Claudii to avoid Lucius. However, these prohibitions were largely traditional, and not strictly enforced, since individuals with most of these names are found at various times.

=== Cognomina and stirpes ===
Because there were relatively few praenomina in widespread use, and the same praenomina tended to be used repeatedly within each gens, cognomina were also used to distinguish between individuals and branches of a gens at an early time. Thus, the Valerii of the early Republic included three brothers named Publius Valerius Poplicola, Marcus Valerius Volusus, and Manius Valerius Maximus. These surnames sometimes became hereditary, and were passed down within a stirps, as with the Tullii Cicerones, but new cognomina were frequently added to or replaced older ones, and cognomina might be shared or revived at a later time by different branches of a gens. In imperial times, cognomina virtually replaced praenomina, with brothers typically receiving distinctive surnames, and frequently sharing the same praenomen.

=== Women's names ===
A rigid adherence to tradition and legal formality kept praenomina in use among Roman men for centuries after they had lost most of their value for distinguishing between individuals. Women's names were less constrained, and became more flexible at an early time. A Roman woman inherited her nomen gentilicium in its feminine form. Cicero's daughter was named Tullia, although he frequently called her by the diminutive Tulliola. Because she had no sisters, and because nomina were normally inherited from one's father, this was sufficient to distinguish her from every other member of her immediate family, both before and after she married. If there were multiple sisters in a family, they could be given distinguishing praenomina, but these were sometimes placed after the gentilicium as though they were cognomina. In the time of the Republic, women were rarely referred to by family surnames. In imperial times, it became common for both men and women to have personal cognomina, or receive surnames from their ancestors on either side of their families.

== Social function ==
Members of individual gentes carried out their own religious rites, and some cults were traditionally associated with specific gentes. Reportedly gentiles were responsible for the adoption and guardianship of other members. If a member of a gens died intestate and without immediate family, his property was distributed to the rest of the gens. Roman writers and early modern scholars believed that a gens could establish its own private laws, which were theoretically binding on all of its members. However, no public enactment is recorded as having been passed by the assembly of a gens, and besides sharing common traditions, no means by which a gens could be led or governed is mentioned in any Roman source. Thus, as a group, the gentes had considerable influence on the development of Roman law and religious practices, but comparatively little influence on the political and constitutional history of Rome.

== Patrician and plebeian gentes ==
Certain gentes were considered patrician, and others plebeian. According to tradition, the patricians were descended from the "city fathers", or patres; that is, the heads of the family at the time of its foundation by Romulus, the first King of Rome. Other noble families which came to Rome during the time of the kings were also admitted to the patriciate, including several who emigrated from Alba Longa after that city was destroyed by Tullus Hostilius. The last definite instance of a gens being admitted to the patriciate prior to the first century BC was when the Claudii were added to the ranks of the patricians after coming to Rome in 504 BC, five years after the establishment of the Republic.

Numerous sources describe two classes amongst the patrician gentes, known as the gentes maiores, or major gentes, and the gentes minores, or minor gentes. No definite information has survived concerning which families were numbered amongst the gentes maiores, or even how many there were, but the distinction may have arisen from the gradual addition of new patrician gentes over time, with the oldest houses being recognized as the maiores. However, they almost certainly included the Aemilii, Claudii, Cornelii, Fabii, Manlii, and Valerii. Nor is it certain whether this distinction was of any practical importance, although it has been suggested that the princeps senatus, or speaker of the Senate, was usually chosen from their number.

For the first several decades of the Republic, it is not entirely certain which gentes were considered patrician and which plebeian. However, a series of laws promulgated in 451 and 450 BC as the Twelve Tables attempted to codify a rigid distinction between the classes, formally excluding the plebeians from holding any of the major magistracies from that time until the passage of the Lex Licinia Sextia in 367 BC. Another law promulgated as part of the tables forbade the intermarriage of patricians and plebeians, but this was repealed after only a few years, by the Lex Canuleia in 445 BC.

Despite the formal reconciliation of the orders in 367, the patrician houses, which as time passed represented a smaller and smaller percentage of the Roman populace, continued to hold on to as much power as possible, resulting in frequent conflict between the orders over the next two centuries. Certain patrician families regularly opposed the sharing of power with the plebeians, while others favoured it, and some were divided.

Many gentes included both patrician and plebeian branches. These may have arisen through adoption or manumission, or when two unrelated families bearing the same nomen became confused. It may also be that individual members of a gens voluntarily left or were expelled from the patriciate, along with their descendants. In some cases, gentes that must originally have been patrician, or which were so regarded during the early Republic, were later known only by their plebeian descendants.

By the first century BC, the practical distinction between the patricians and the plebeians was largely symbolic, with only a few priesthoods and ceremonial offices restricted to patricians. However, such was their prestige that, beginning with the administration of Caesar, and continuing into imperial times, a number of families were raised to the patriciate, replacing older families that had become extinct or faded into obscurity, and which were no longer represented in the Roman senate. By the third century, the distinction between patricians and plebeians had lost its relevance. The emperor Constantine and his successors revived the title as a mark of distinction granted to individuals, rather than a class to which an entire family belonged.

== See also ==
- Genos – a similar concept in Ancient Greece
- Gana – a cognate Sanskrit term referring to a different type of human group
- Gentile
- List of Roman gentes
- List of Roman nomina
- Roman naming conventions

== Bibliography ==
=== Ancient sources ===
- Marcus Tullius Cicero, Brutus.
- Dionysius of Halicarnassus, Romaike Archaiologia (Roman Antiquities).
- Titus Livius (Livy), History of Rome.
- Gaius Suetonius Tranquillus, De Vita Caesarum (Lives of the Caesars, or The Twelve Caesars).

=== Modern sources ===
- T. Robert S. Broughton, The Magistrates of the Roman Republic, American Philological Association (1952–1986).
- George Davis Chase, "The Origin of Roman Praenomina", in Harvard Studies in Classical Philology, vol. VIII, pp. 103–184 (1897).
- Timothy J. Cornell, The Beginnings of Rome: Italy and Rome from the Bronze Age to the Punic Wars (c. 1000–264 BC), Routledge, London (1995).
- Dictionary of Greek and Roman Biography and Mythology, William Smith, ed., Little, Brown and Company, Boston (1849).
- Michael Grant, History of Rome, Scribner's (1978).
- Harper's Dictionary of Classical Literature and Antiquities, Harry Thurston Peck, ed. (Second Edition, 1897).
- Oxford Classical Dictionary, N. G. L. Hammond and H. H. Scullard, eds., Clarendon Press, Oxford (Second Edition, 1970).
- August Pauly, Georg Wissowa, et alii, Realencyclopädie der Classischen Altertumswissenschaft (Scientific Encyclopedia of the Knowledge of Classical Antiquities, abbreviated RE or PW), J. B. Metzler, Stuttgart (1894–1980).
- Benet Salway, "What's in a Name? A Survey of Roman Onomastic Practice from c. 700 B.C. to A.D. 700", in Journal of Roman Studies, vol. 84, pp. 124–145 (1994).
