= Battle of Sepeia =

Spartan victory against Argos, 494 BC

- Part of The Reign of Cleomenes I
Date	494 BC
Location	Sepeia, Tiryns
Result	Spartan victory

Belligerents
Sparta	Argos

Commanders and leaders
Cleomenes I	

Casualties and losses
	6,000

At the Battle of Sepeia (Ancient Greek: Σήπεια; c. 494 BC), the Spartan forces of Cleomenes I defeated the Argives, fully establishing Spartan dominance in the Peloponnese. The Battle of Sepeia is infamous for having the highest number of casualties within a battle during the classical Greek period.

The closest thing to a contemporaneous source for the description of the battle is, as for many events in this time period, the Histories of Herodotus (written approximately fifty years later, c. 440 BC). Herodotus provides context of the political, military and economic landscape of the Peloponnese before, during and after the Battle of Sepeia. During the 5th century Sparta was one of the largest military powers in the Peloponnese. This is evident through the Spartans' victory over Argos in the Battle of the 300 Champions (546 BC) to gain control over the highly disputed territory of Thyrea. However, the Argives sought revenge on Sparta, seizing back control of Thyrea approximately fifty years after the Battle of the 300 Champions. Ultimately, this reignited tensions between the Spartans and the Argives, driving the two forces to engage in what is now known as the Battle of Sepeia.

The Spartan forces were led by the Agiad King Cleomenes I. Cleomenes wished to take action against Argos. The King often used religion as a political tool of manipulation to enlist the support of the Spartan people. Thus, Cleomenes sent four Púthιoι to the Oracle of Delphi (also known as Pythia) seeking the oracle's support and religious reassurance. Cleomenes proclaimed that the Oracle of Delphi predicted Sparta’s triumph over Argive forces in a future battle. Thus, Cleomenes had gained the religious approval necessary to enlist the support of the Spartan people to wage war on Argos.

The Argive forces also sought the advice of the Oracle of Delphi. However, the Oracle foretold the Argives of their looming defeat in a future battle. Thus, the Argives were cautious of their Spartan enemies, and reluctant to engage in battle if not forced to do so.

Ultimately, when the Battle of Sepeia began, the foretold predictions by the Oracle of Delphi, dictated the stratagems employed by the Spartans and the Argives respectively. The Argives, cautious of the Spartan’s predicted victory, decided to listen to the Spartan Herald’s commands to his troops and copy what the Herald said. This allowed for the Argives to take their meal breaks at the same time as the Spartans, ensuring the Spartans would not attack the Argives when not prepared for battle. When Cleomenes became aware that the Argives were paying close attention to the Herald’s orders, he instructed his forces to ignore the next mealtime call and attack at this call instead. When the Herald made his call for a mealtime break, the Spartans attacked an unsuspecting Argive force. Many Argives were slaughtered, with the surviving hoplites seeking refuge in a nearby grove named ‘The Sacred Grove of Apollo’.

Cleomenes, unwilling to leave any Argive survivors, devised a strategy to trick the hoplites into leaving the Grove’s religious and physical protection. Cleomenes deceived the Argive men into believing that a ransom had been granted and paid – allowing for their release. However, when an Argive man tried to walk free, they were executed. When the Argives realised what was occurring, they stopped responding to the ransom calls. Consequently, Cleomenes set the grove on fire forcing the remaining hoplites out of the grove’s protection. The Battle of Sepeia resulted in approximately 6000 deaths, accounting for an estimated fifty per cent of the Argive population.

The significance of this Battle is illustrated through the revolution of the Argive political system. The doûloι experienced an elevated social status, due to the loss of noble Argive men.

== Prelude ==
The fertile plain of Thyrea was a long-disputed territory that lay between the two city states of Sparta and Argos. During the Battle of the 300 Champions (546 BC) Sparta gained control over this region. Nearly two generations had since passed when Argos reclaimed Thyrea.

The events that occurred after this held significant religious undertones. Once the Oracle of Delphi had foretold the success of Sparta against Argos, Cleomenes led his armies to the Erasinos River on the border of the Argolid.

The Oracle of Delphi Entranced

Herodotus believes Cleomenes intended to camp his forces there, however when the king presented a sacrifice to the Erasinos River he received bad omens. Rather uncharacteristically, Cleomenes obeyed the signs of the River God proclaiming: “I admire the God of the River for refusing to betray his countrymen. But the Argives will not get away that easily” and left. Cleomenes then retreated South and marched his Spartan forces East of Thyrea to Sicyon.

In Thyrea, Cleomenes made another sacrifice to the sea to access the river via a different route. This time the omens appeared favourable. Consequently, Cleomenes made arrangements with the Aeginetans and Sicyonians, to transport the Spartan forces to the district of Tiryns and Nauplia (on the coast of the Argolid). The transportation route Cleomenes arranged was a challenging maritime task to fulfil, involving the transportation of the Spartan forces across the díolkos at Corinth.

== Dating the Battle ==
Whilst Herodotus has been used as the primary source for the Battle of Sepeia, other historians have contested the date of this battle. Herodotus fails to explicitly date the battle, recording the event as part of the whole Spartan expedition against Argos. The only mentioning of a date occurs in his book Pausnias III, where Herodotus suggests the battle occurred at the beginning of the reign of Cleomenes I i.e. 520 BC.

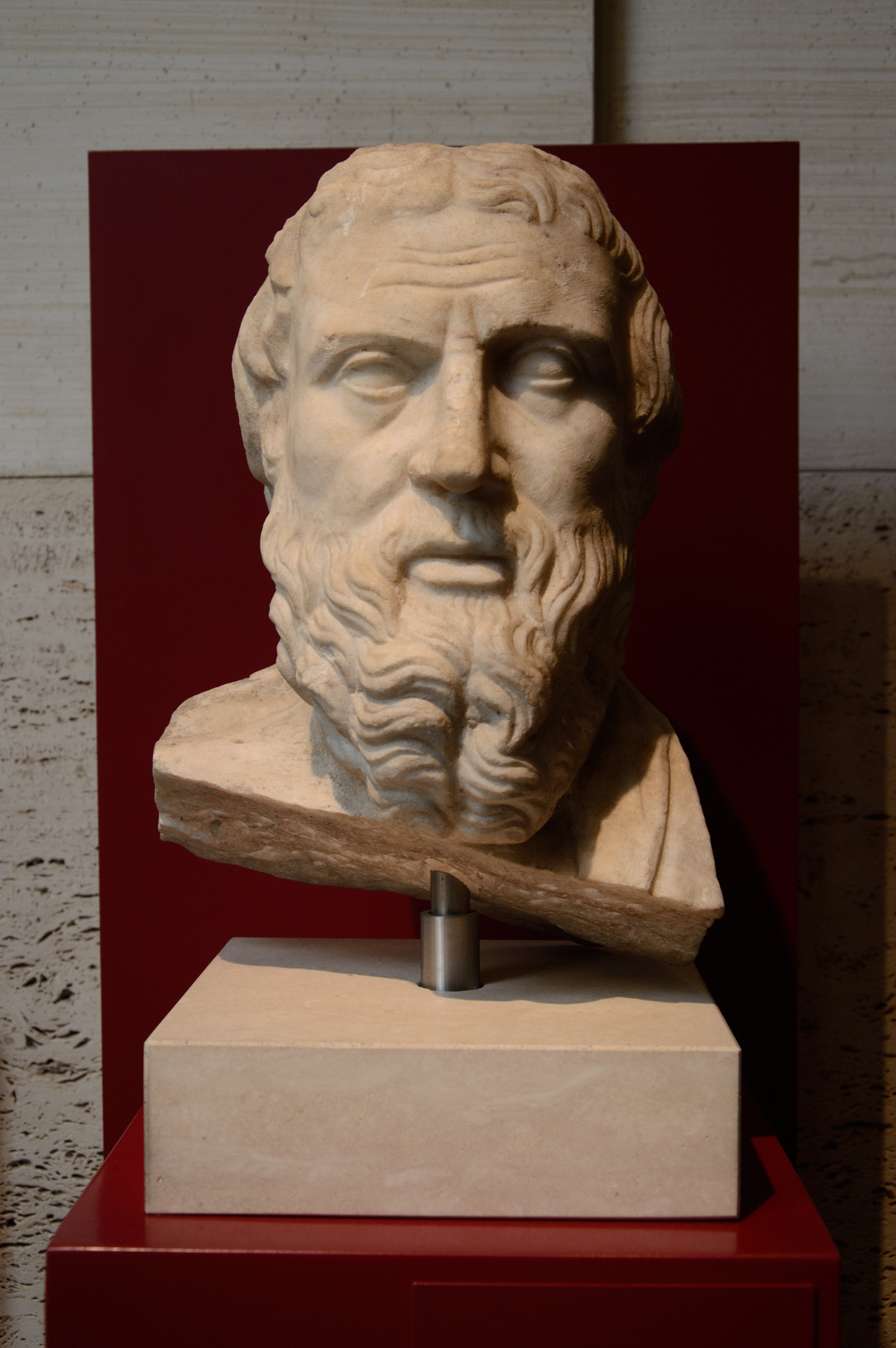
Bust of Herodotus in Palazzo Massimo (Rome)

Modern historians have attempted to calculate a date for the battle based on other passages from Herodotus. When the Argives visited the Oracle of Delphi, two predictions were told; the demise of Argos and that of the Milesians, both of which are foretold to occur at the same time. The part of the prophecy concerning the Milesians was fulfilled at the end of the Ionian Revolt (494BC). Thus, the estimated date for the Battle of Sepeia is 494BC.

== Strategic and Tactical Deliberations ==
The strategic and tactical deliberations of the Battle of Sepeia begin with Spartan’s march to Argos. Initially, Cleomenes led the Spartans to the Erasinos River, on the border of the Argolid, before reporting that the omen’s were not favourable there to set up camp. Interpretations of Cleomenes retreat, suggests the Argives had gained the higher ground on the opposite side of the stream. Cleomenes reconvened his army on the border of Tiryns. The Argive forces were caught off guard by the Agiad King’s repositioning; rushing to set up camp in Sepeia at a close distance from the Lacedaemonians. The Argives had lost their high ground advantage.

== Battle ==
Ultimately, Sparta won the Battle of Sepeia through deception. Reluctant to engage in battle, the Argives had been mimicking the Spartan Herald's call for meal time breaks. This ensured the Spartans did not attack the Argives when the hoplites were not prepared.

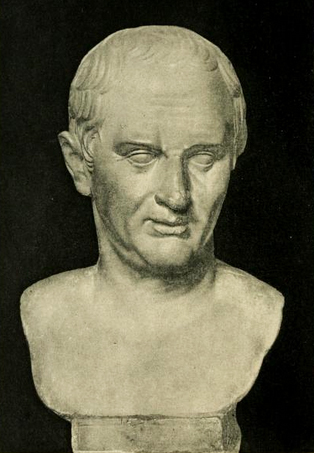
Cicero Bust

When Cleomenes became aware of this strategy, he was able to weaponize this against them. Cleomenes instructed his forces to ignore the Herald’s announcement and instead attack at this call. The Argive forces were caught off guard, and a slaughter ensued.

However, other historical accounts suggest a seven-day truce had been agreed upon by the two forces. Contrary to Herodotus’ account, Plutarch suggests the Spartan forces broke the truce on the third night and attacked the unsuspecting Argives. When Cleomenes was questioned for his breach of the truce; the King argued the truce was made for seven days and didn’t include nights.

Additionally, Cicero further contests the nature of the Battle in his treatise ‘De Officiis’. Cicero suggests a thirty-day truce was agreed upon between the Spartans and the Argives. However, similar to Plutarch, Cicero describes a situation in which a general plunders the fields at night, because the truce had been made for days and not nights. Cicero does not mention a specific date of the attack nor does he explicitly name Cleomenes or the Argives. Consequently, due to the large differences between Cicero’s and Plutarch’s account, and Cicero’s inability to name Cleomenes I, it is improbable that Cicero’s account would be used as evidence for the Battle.

== Aftermath ==
After the initial onslaught, many Argive hoplites sought refuge in the ‘Sacred Grove of Apollo’. The Argive men hoped the religious value of the grove would prevent the Spartan forces pursuing further action. However, Cleomenes I was by reputation ruthless, and deceived the Argives to their death. Cleomenes announced that the hoplites who’d been ransomed for the standard fee were free to leave. The names of the men whose ‘ransom’ had been paid were called out individually. However, when an Argive hoplite stepped out of the Sacred Grove, they were executed by the Spartans. According to Herodotus, at least fifty Argive men were deceived by this strategy, until one of the men inside the grove climbed a tree and witnessed what was happening. Thus, when the Argives became aware of the double cross, they stopped responding to the ransom calls. Consequently, Cleomenes set fire to the grove, slaughtering any survivors who attempted to escape.

The Battle of Sepeia and the sacrilege that ensued resulted in six thousand Argive casualties. Whilst Pausanias records a loss of five thousand Argive men, modern historians widely accept Herodotus’ higher figure.

Due to the nature and ambiguity pertaining to historical sources and administration during the time period, an accurate estimation of the Argive population is improbable. However, Aristotle in his fifth book ‘Politics’, recorded a Spartan population of ten thousand. If the assumption was made that we could assume a similar Argive population during the Battle of Sepeia, the losses of six thousand would have compromised a large majority of young and middle-aged Argive men. Ultimately, the Battle of Sepeia was one of the most decisive battles during Ancient Greek history.

== Significance ==
The Battle of Sepeia severely depleted Argos’ military power. The Argives were unable to engage in battle for a generation. The next time Sparta and Argos fought would be in the Peloponnesian wars.

Additionally, this Battle holds profound political consequences, provoking an upheaval of the Argive administrative system. Due to the high number of casualties during the Battle of Sepeia, Argos lost a majority of their young and middle-aged men. Consequently, the city was in need of men to fulfil the political and administrative roles of recently deceased noblemen. Ultimately, due to the high number of widowed women and shortage of noble Argive men, many doûloι married into political and administrative

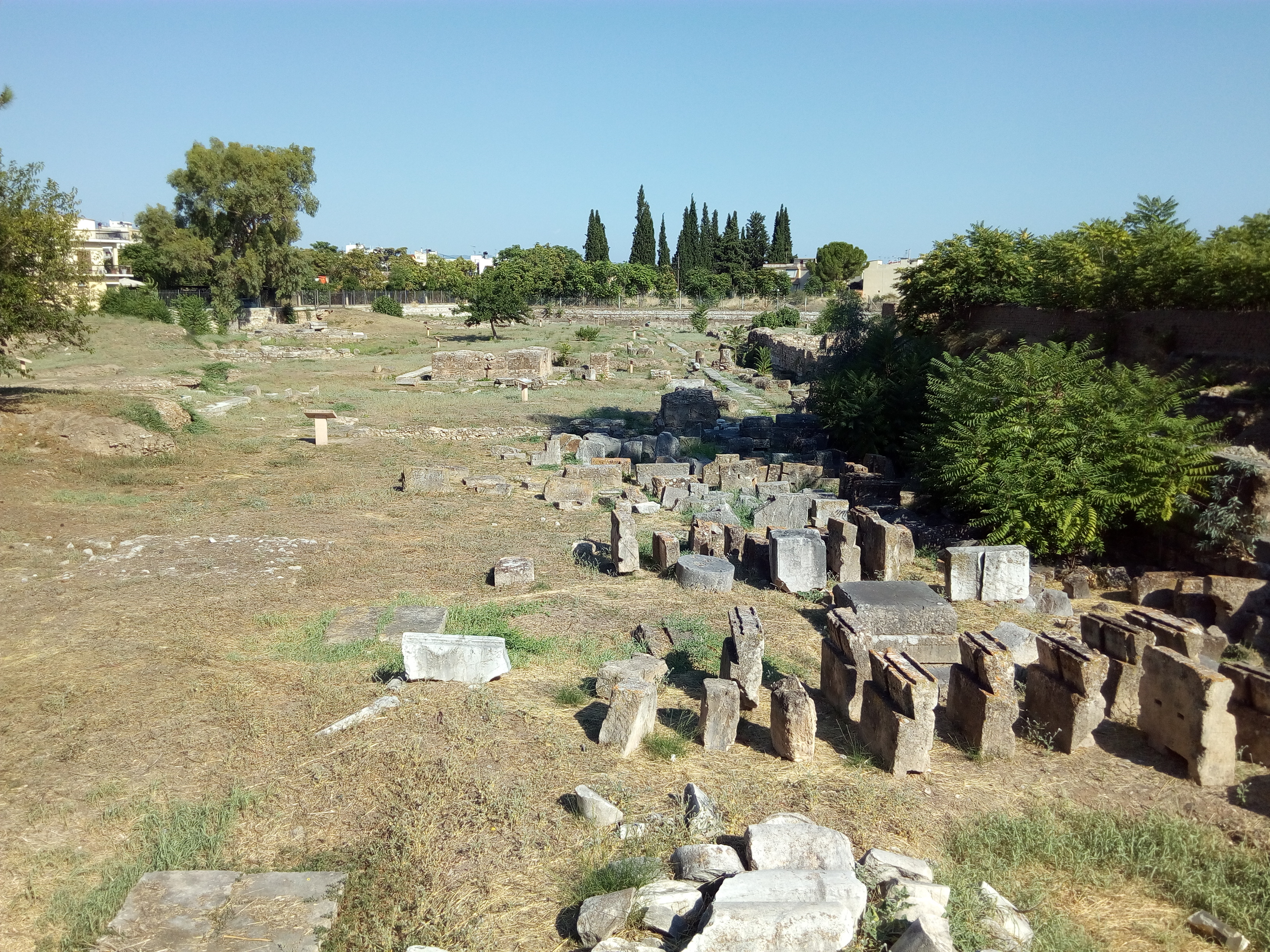
Ancient Argos agora

positions. Prior to the Battle of Sepeia, the doûloι were slaves and belonged in the bottom echelons of society. The Battle of Sepeia essentially allowed for a political revolution, elevating the status of the doûloι, until Argive born noble men reached maturity.

Consequently, based on the Agrarian economy and serf labour, women of the Dorian ruling class enjoyed greater political, social and economic freedoms (compared to women from Sparta and Crete) during the classical period.
