= Sacramentum (oath) =

Roman oath

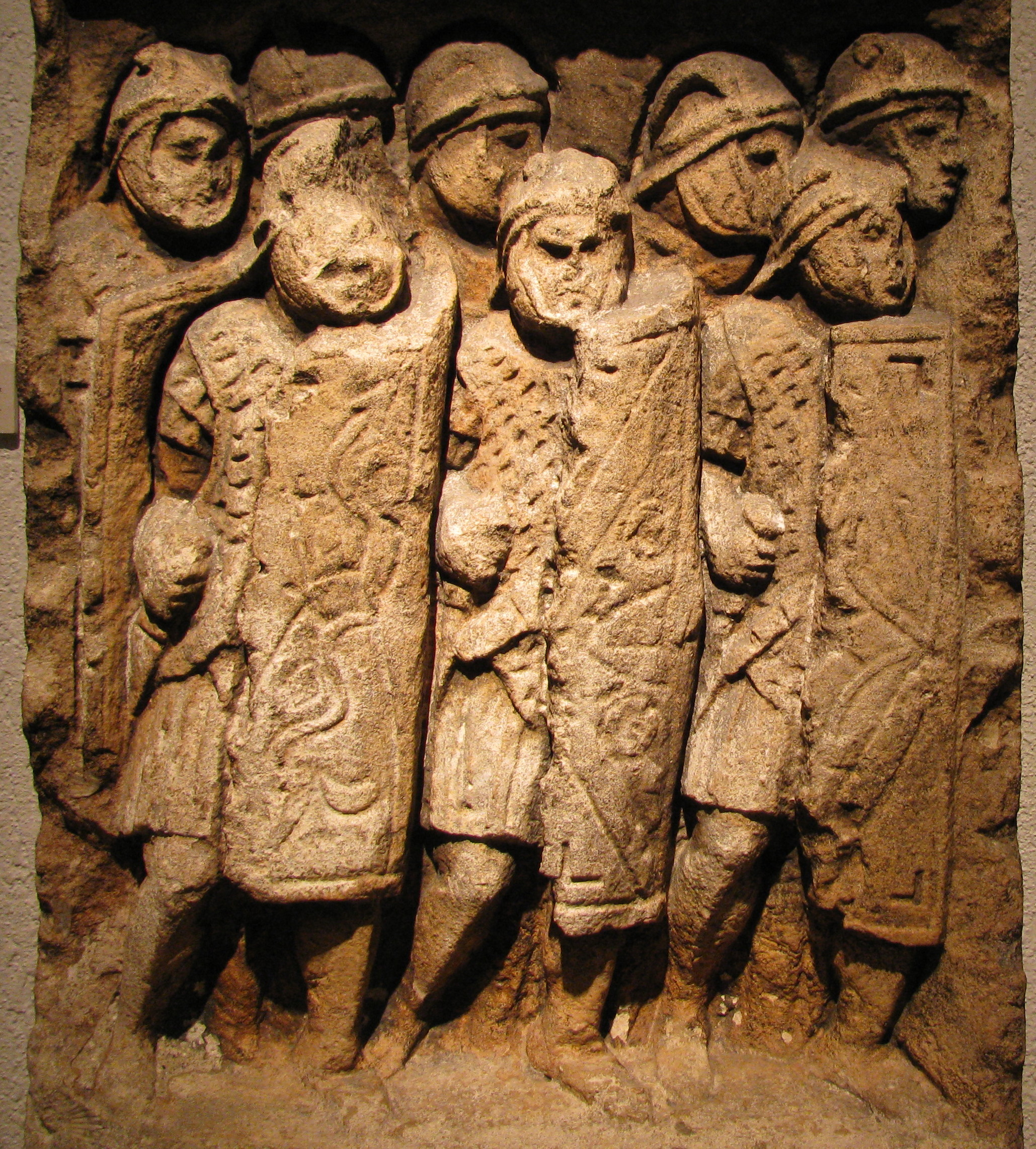
Roman legionnaires pledged their loyalty—to the consul in the Republican era or later to the emperor—with the oath called the sacramentum militare.

In ancient Roman religion and law, the sacramentum was an oath or vow that rendered the swearer sacer, "given to the gods," in the negative sense if he violated it. Sacramentum also referred to a thing that was pledged as a sacred bond, and consequently forfeit if the oath were violated. Both instances imply an underlying sacratio, act of consecration.

The sacramentum differs from iusiurandum, which is more common in legal application, as for instance swearing an oath in court. A sacramentum establishes a direct relation between the person swearing (or the thing pledged in the swearing of the oath) and the gods; the iusiurandum is an oath of good faith within the human community that is in accordance with ius as witnessed by the gods.

Sacramentum is the origin of the English word "sacrament", a transition in meaning pointed to by Apuleius's use of the word to refer to religious initiation.

== Legal usage ==
In Roman law, a thing given as a pledge or bond was a sacramentum. The sacramentum legis actio was a sum of money deposited in a legal procedure to affirm that both parties to the litigation were acting in good faith. If correct law and procedures had been followed, it could be assumed that the outcome was iustum, right or valid. The losing side had thus in effect committed perjury, and forfeited his sacramentum as a form of piaculum, an expiatory sacrifice; the winner got his deposit back. The forfeited sacramentum was normally allotted by the state to the funding of sacra publica, public religious rites.

== Military oath ==
The sacramentum militare (also as militum or militiae) was the oath taken by soldiers in pledging their loyalty to the consul in the Republican era or later to the emperor. The sacramentum as pertaining to both the law and the military indicates the religious basis for these institutions.

The text of the oath was recorded by Vegetius:

Iurant autem milites omnia se strenue facturos quae praeceperit imperator, numquam deserturos militiam nec mortem recusaturos pro Romana republica!
("But the soldiers swear that they shall faithfully execute all that the Emperor commands, that they shall never desert the service, and that they shall not seek to avoid death for the Roman republic!")

The sacramentum that renders the soldier sacer helps explain why he was subjected to harsher penalties, such as execution and corporal punishment, that were considered inappropriate for civilian citizens, at least under the Republic. In effect, he had put his life on deposit, a condition also of the fearsome sacramentum sworn by gladiators. In the rare case of punishment by decimation, the surviving legionaries were often required to renew their oath, affirming the role of state religio as the foundation of Roman military discipline.

By the 3rd century the sacramentum was administered annually, on January 3, as attested by the calendar of state ritual discovered at Dura-Europos, the so-called Feriale Duranum, which dates to the reign of Severus Alexander (222-235 AD). In the later empire, the oath of loyalty created conflict for Christians serving in the military, and produced a number of soldier-martyrs. Tertullian condemned any Christian soldier's willingness to swear the sacramentum, since baptism was the only sacrament a Christian should observe.
