= Mons Sacer =

Hill northeast of ancient Rome

Coordinates: 41°56′27″N 12°31′57″E

Pierre-Nicolas Brisset, View of the Ponte Nomentano (1837). The Mons Sacer rises behind a bridge crossing the Anio along the route of the Via Ficulensis, later the Via Nomentana.

The Mons Sacer, Sacer Mons, or Sacred Mount is a hill in Rome, famed as the location of the first secession of the plebs, in 494 BC.

== Geography ==
The Mons Sacer is a hill northeast of the Anio, the modern Aniene, a little above the confluence of the Anio with the Tiber. It was about three miles northeast of the ancient city, north of the Via Ficulensis, but now lies within the boundaries of modern Rome, where it gives its name to the Monte Sacro quarter. To the east and southwest, the hill descends steeply to the valley of the Anio, while to the north the hill is connected with a plateau extending away from the city. A small stream, the Rivus Ulmanus, or stream of elms, descends from the steep eastern slope. The hill is located within Simón Bolívar Park and forms part of Municipio III, within the city of Rome.

== History ==
=== Ancient Rome ===
The name of the Sacred Mount might be derived from its use as the site of rituals by augurs or haruspices, but according to the historians, it took its name from the lex Sacrata (Sacred Law) that ended the first secession, which was passed and commemorated by an altar on the hill. The occasion for this law was strife between the patricians, the hereditary aristocracy of ancient Rome, who held nearly all of the city's political and economic power, and the plebeians, the common folk, who formed the majority of the city's population. This conflict of the orders reached its head in 494 BC, when faced with crushing debt, the plebeians appealed to the Roman Senate for relief, and were rebuffed. They then seceded en masse to the Sacred Mount, where they elected their own leaders, and refused all entreaties by the patricians to return.

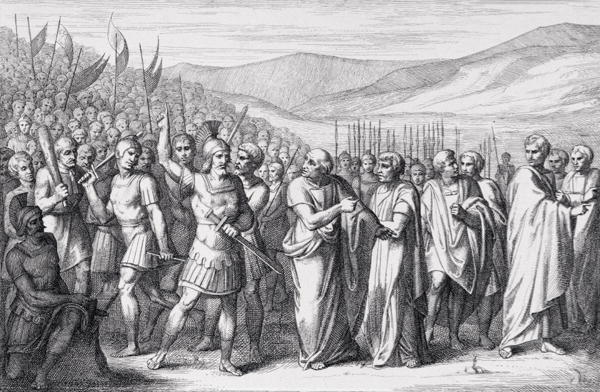
Bartolomeo Barloccini, The Secession of the People to the Mons Sacer (1849).

This standoff was resolved when the Senate, fearful of war with the Sabines, and faced with the lack of an army to fight on the city's behalf, sent envoys known to be favourably disposed to the plebs, led by Agrippa Menenius Lanatus. Menenius and his colleagues argued that neither the patricians nor the plebeians could survive without the other, and agreed to a series of concessions to induce the people to return to the city. The most important of these established two annual offices to be elected by the plebeian assembly alone: the aediles, who took charge of the city's temples, public buildings, and religious festivals, and the tribunes of the plebs, who could advocate and propose legislation on behalf of the plebeians, and veto the actions of the magistrates or other officials.

In 449 BC, the plebeians seceded from the city for a second time, in protest of the tyranny of the second decemvirate. According to Livy, they first withdrew to the Aventine Hill, in the southern end of Rome, but finding the decemvirs unmoved, they resolved to desert the city for the Sacred Mount, hoping that the symbolism of that hill and its role in the first secession would stir the decemvirs to action. They marched out of the city along the Via Ficulensis, and once again stationed themselves on the Mons Sacer, where they remained until the senate's envoys were able to negotiate their return. Cicero reports these events in reverse, stating that the plebeians first seceded to the Sacred Mount, then returned to the city and occupied the Aventine Hill.

The Sacred Mount plays no significant role in Roman history after these secessions.

=== Simón Bolívar ===
The hill became well-known again during the Spanish American wars of independence due to its association with the famed liberator Simón Bolívar. On 18 August 1805, Bolívar traveled to Mons Sacer during a Grand Tour where he swore an oath to end Spanish rule in the Americas.

In the mid-nineteenth century the hill was uninhabited. Today, a monument to Bolívar is located on the summit.

== Bibliography ==
- Marcus Tullius Cicero, Brutus, De Republica, Pro Cornelio.
- Dionysius of Halicarnassus, Romaike Archaiologia (Roman Antiquities).
- Titus Livius (Livy), History of Rome.
- Quintus Asconius Pedianus, Commentarius in Oratio Ciceronis Pro Cornelio (Commentary on Cicero's Oration Pro Cornelio).
- Appianus Alexandrinus (Appian), Bellum Civile (The Civil War).
- Antonio Nibby, Analisi Storico-Topografico-Antiquaria della Carta di' Dintorni di Roma (Historical, Topographical, and Antiquarian Description of the Map of the Area of Rome), Tipografia della Belle Arti, Rome (1837).
- Dictionary of Greek and Roman Geography, William Smith, ed., Little, Brown and Company, Boston (1854).
