= Manius Valerius Maximus =

Early 5th-century BC Roman politician

Dictator of the Roman Republic
- In office 494 BC – 494 BC
- Preceded by: Aulus Postumius
- Succeeded by: Gaius Aemilius Mamercus

Personal details
- Born: Ancient Rome
- Died: 463 BC? Ancient Rome

Manius Valerius Maximus was Roman dictator in 494 BC during the first secession of the plebs. His brothers were Publius Valerius Publicola and Marcus Valerius Volusus. They were said to be the sons of Volesus Valerius.

== Appointment as dictator ==
During the period of popular discontent in Rome which led to the First secessio plebis, the Volsci, Sabines and the Aequi took up arms against Rome at the same time. To meet the threat and because of the popular political concerns at the time, in 494 BC Valerius was appointed dictator by the Roman Senate. He was said to have been chosen because of his moderate temper. His appointment was accepted by the people because of the popularity of his late brother Publius.

== Resolution of military affairs ==
Valerius called for conscripts and the people responded positively. Ten legions (about 45,000 men) were raised, a greater number than had been raised previously at any one time. Four of these legions were assigned to the dictator to deal with the Sabines who were regarded as the most serious of the three military threats, and three to each of the consuls to meet the Aequi and the Volsci.

Valerius marched with his army to meet the Sabines and won a victory, for which he was awarded a triumph. Additionally the honour of a curule chair in the Circus Maximus was given to him and his descendants.

== Secession of the plebs ==
After the armies' return to Rome, Valerius requested the senate to deal with the ongoing debt issues which were afflicting the people. The senate declined to act, and the dictator was outraged. He said before the senate:

You will not let me recommend concord. Trust me, before long you will wish that the people of Rome had patrons similar to me. For my part, I will neither further disappoint my fellow citizens, nor will I be dictator to no purpose. Internal divisions and foreign wars caused the republic to require such a magistrate. Peace has been secured abroad, it is impeded at home. I will be a witness to these disturbances as a private citizen rather than as dictator.

— Manius Valerius Maximus, Livy, Ab urbe condita, 2.31

He resigned his commission, and went to his house, greeted by the applause of the people. In some traditions, following his dictatorship, he was first elected augur in 494 BC and then princeps senatus during the census of 493 BC. He would remain an augur until his death in a pestilence in 463 BC.

== Legacy ==
In AD 2, a statue of Manius Valerius Maximus was erected in the Forum of Augustus alongside other "great men of Rome", under which was an elogia.

== Conflicting identification and death ==
Festus identifies Manius Valerius Maximus as a son of Marcus Valerius Volusus and puts him as Rome's first dictator in 501 BC. Similarly there is some confusion regarding the Valerius who was chosen as Augur in 494 BC, which can be either identified as the former consul Marcus Valerius Volusus, his son, the previously mentioned Manius Valerius Maximus, or this Manius Valerius Maximus, the dictator of 494 BC. If it was either of the brothers to Poplicola (both described as elderly) they would have been extremely old by 463 BC when this Augur is said to have succumbed during a large pestilence in Rome.
