= Le Ferriere, Italy =

Hamlet in the municipality of Latina, Lazio, Italy

Le Ferriere
- Frazione
- Location of Le Ferriere in Italy
- Coordinates: 41°30′57.92″N 12°45′28.44″E
- Country: Italy
- Region: Lazio
- Province: Latina (LT)
- Comune: Latina

Area
  - Total: 0.2594 km^{2} (0.1002 sq mi)
- Elevation: 626 m (2,054 ft)

Population (2021)
  - Total: 299
  - Density: 1,150/km^{2} (2,990/sq mi)
- Time zone: UTC+1 (CET)
  - Summer (DST): UTC+2 (CEST)
- Postal code: 04010
- Dialing code: 0773

Le Ferriere is a hamlet (frazione) of the municipality of Latina, in the province of Latina, Lazio, central Italy. Although often referred to as a frazione, its official administrative status is inconsistently documented. Some sources describe it as a località (locality), while others include it among Latina’s recognized frazioni. It is located approximately 49 km (30 mi) south of Rome.

Le Ferriere is situated near the ancient city of Satricum, an important Volscian and Roman settlement noted for the Sanctuary of Mater Matuta. Excavations have revealed temples, votive deposits, and a necropolis. In 2004, archaeologists discovered the oldest known wine vessel in central Italy here—a clay skyphos dated to the 5th century BCE. The former iron mill and strawboard factory at Le Ferriere, situated at the foot of the ancient acropolis, has been renovated in recent years as part of the provincial "Parco Satricum" project to house the exhibition Satricum: Scavi e reperti archeologici, which opened in June 2014.

The name "Le Ferriere" derives from ironworks established around the 12th century by the monks of Grottaferrata. These were later modernized under Pope Sixtus V in 1588 and became the most significant in Lazio. The industrial legacy continued with the opening of a paper mill in the early 20th century, which operated until 1978.

The hamlet is also known as the site of the 1902 martyrdom of Maria Goretti, who was later canonized as a saint by the Catholic Church. Her remains are interred below the main altar in the lower chapel of the Santuario di Nettuno, in Nettuno, 11 km (6.8 mi) away from Le Ferriere.

== Sources ==
- "A Le Ferriere la più antica coppa per vino dell’Italia centrale", in Latina Oggi, 16 June 2005.
- Data from: Citypopulation.de – Le Ferriere

== See also ==
- Ferriere
- Ferriere (disambiguation)
- La Ferrière
