= Ferrières =

Ferrière or Ferrières may refer to:

- Château Ferrière, a Bordeaux wine producer in Margaux
- Château de Ferrières, in the Seine-et-Marne département of France
- Ferrières Abbey in Ferrières-en-Gâtinais

== Places ==
=== Belgium ===
- Ferrières, Belgium, a municipality of Wallonia in the province of Liège

=== France ===
- Ferrière-et-Lafolie, in the Haute-Marne département
- Ferrière-la-Grande, in the Nord département
- Ferrière-la-Petite, in the Nord département
- Ferrière-Larçon, in the Indre-et-Loire département
- Ferrière-sur-Beaulieu, in the Indre-et-Loire département
- Ferrières, Charente-Maritime, in the Charente-Maritime département
- Ferrières, Manche, in the Manche département
- Ferrières, Meurthe-et-Moselle, in the Meurthe-et-Moselle département
- Ferrières, Oise, in the Oise département
- Ferrières, Hautes-Pyrénées, in the Hautes-Pyrénées département
- Ferrières, Somme, in the Somme département
- Ferrières, Tarn, in the Tarn département
- Ferrières-en-Bray, in the Seine-Maritime département
- Ferrières-en-Brie, in the Seine-et-Marne département
- Ferrières-en-Gâtinais, in the Loiret département
- Ferrières-Haut-Clocher, in the Eure département
- Ferrières-la-Verrerie, in the Orne département
- Ferrières-le-Lac, in the Doubs département
- Ferrières-les-Bois, in the Doubs département
- Ferrières-lès-Ray, in the Haute-Saône département
- Ferrières-lès-Scey, in the Haute-Saône département
- Ferrières-les-Verreries, in the Hérault département
- Ferrières-Poussarou, in the Hérault département
- Ferrières-Saint-Hilaire, in the Eure département
- Ferrières-Saint-Mary, in the Cantal département
- Ferrières-sur-Ariège, in the Ariège département
- Ferrières-sur-Sichon, in the Allier département

== People ==
- Alexandre de Ferrière (died after 1845), French playwright, journalist, printer, publisher and writer
- Charles de Ferrieres (1823–1908), British Member of Parliament
- Charles Grangier de la Ferrière (1738–1794), French general of the War of the First Coalition
- Jean-Michel Ferrière (born 1959), French footballer
- Raoul de Ferrières (fl. 1200–1210), Norman nobleman and trouvère

== See also ==
- La Ferrière (disambiguation)
- Ferriere, a comune (municipality) in the Province of Piacenza in the Italian region Emilia-Romagna
- Rick LaFerriere (born 1961), Canadian ice hockey goaltender
