= Satricum =

- Le Ferriere
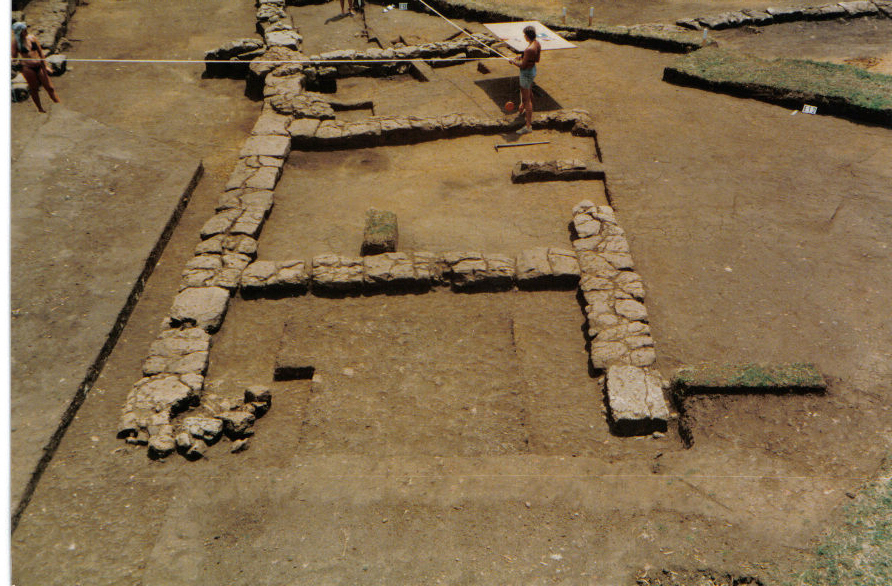
- Students at work at the archaeological site of Satricum in 1983.

- Location within Lazio
- 41°30′47.2608″N 12°45′18.2988″E
- Type: settlement
- Cultures: Volscian; Roman Republic
- Location: Borgo Le Ferriere, Italy
- Region: Lazio

History
- Built: 6th century BC

Site notes
- Excavation dates: yes
- Archaeologists: Antonio Nibby; Conrad M. Stibbe; M. Kleibrink; Marijke Gnade
- Condition: ruined
- Public access: yes

Satricum (located near the modern hamlet of Le Ferriere), was an ancient town of Latium vetus, situated on the right bank of the Astura River approximately 60 km (37 mi) southeast of Rome. It lay in a low-lying region south of the Alban Hills, at the northwestern edge of the Pontine Marshes, and was directly accessible from Rome by a road running roughly parallel to the Via Appia.

== History ==
According to Livy, Satricum was an Alban colony, and a member of the Latin League of 499 BC. In c. 488 BC, it was taken by the Volsci. In 386 BC, a force made up of Volscians of the town of Antium, Hernici, and Latins rebelled against Rome and gathered near Satricum. After a battle with the Romans, which was stopped by rain, the Latins and Hernici left and returned home. The Volsci retreated to Satricum, which was taken by storm. In 385 BC, the Romans planted a colony with 2,000 colonists at Satricum. In 382 BC, a joint force of Volsci and Latins from the city of Praeneste took Satricum despite strong resistance by the Roman colonists. In 381 BC, the Romans levied four legions and marched on Satricum. There was a fierce battle, which the Romans won. In 377 BC, a joint Latin and Volscian force encamped near Satricum. It was routed by the Romans and fled to Antium. A quarrel then broke out between the Antiates and the Latins. The former were minded to give up, while the latter did not and left. The Antiates surrendered their city and lands. The Latins burned Satricum in revenge, sparing only the temple of Mater Matuta. In 348 BC the Volsci rebuilt the city. In 346 BC, Antium sent envoys to the cities of the Latins to try to stir up a war. The Romans attacked Satricum. They defeated an army of Antiates and other Volsci, which had been levied in advance. These fled to Satricum. The Romans besieged this town, and 4000 of the enemy surrendered. The town was destroyed and burnt. The temple of Mater Matuta was spared a second time. After this, the town is mentioned by ancient authors only in connection with the temple of Mater Matuta.

== Identification and history of research ==
Antonio Nibby mistakenly identified ancient Satricum with the low hill at Borgo Montello, then known as the Tenuta di Conca, surrounded by tufa cliffs, 1.5 km ESE of present-day Le Ferriere, on which were still scanty remains of walling in rectangular blocks of the same material. In 1896, the hill above Le Ferriere yielded remains of an archaic and early Classical sanctuary ascribed to Mater Matuta, during excavations begun under the direction of Prof. H. Graillot of the University of Bordeaux, member of the École française de Rome. After two weeks, this work was suspended by order of the Italian government, and then resumed under the supervision of Felice Barnabei, Raniero Mengarelli, and A. Cozza. The objects discovered were brought to the Villa Giulia Museum at Rome.

After some cursory investigations during the 1950s, the site of Satricum was brought to light again in 1977, as a result of a concerted effort by the Italian authorities to rescue the antiquities in the Roman campagna that were acutely threatened by large-scale urbanisation and agricultural reform. The alarm was first made public by the exhibition Civiltà del Lazio primitivo at Rome (1976). As a result, the Royal Netherlands Institute in Rome was invited by the Comitato per l'Archeologia laziale to participate in a rescue project and to ascertain the state of preservation of the site.

Since 1977, a comprehensive research program at the site has been carried out through annual excavation and study campaigns. This concerned, first of all, activities by the Royal Dutch Institute at Rome (C. M. Stibbe), later joined by the Universities of Groningen (prof. M. Kleibrink) and Nijmegen (prof. J. de Waele). As of 1990, the project is being executed by the University of Amsterdam alone, under the direction of prof. Marijke Gnade. With her academic retirement in 2024, the project returned to the aegis of the Royal Dutch Institute at Rome, where she was appointed Senior Fellow.

== Results ==
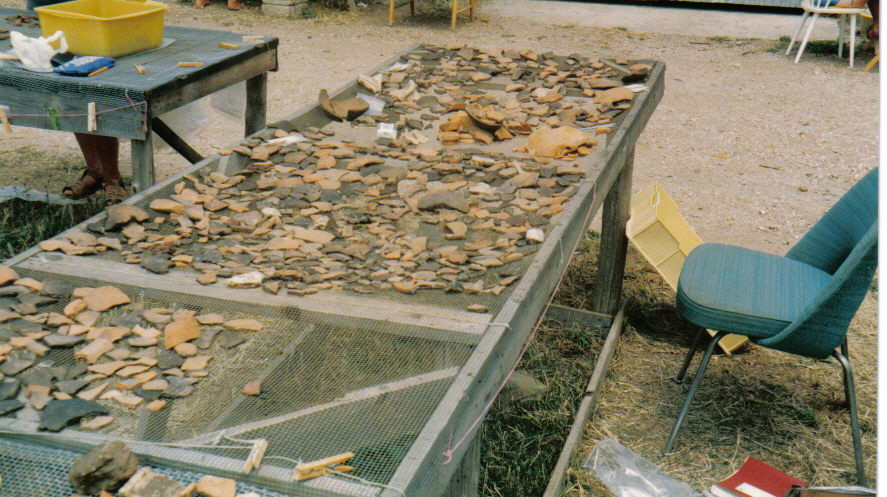
Potsherding from Satricum, 1983.

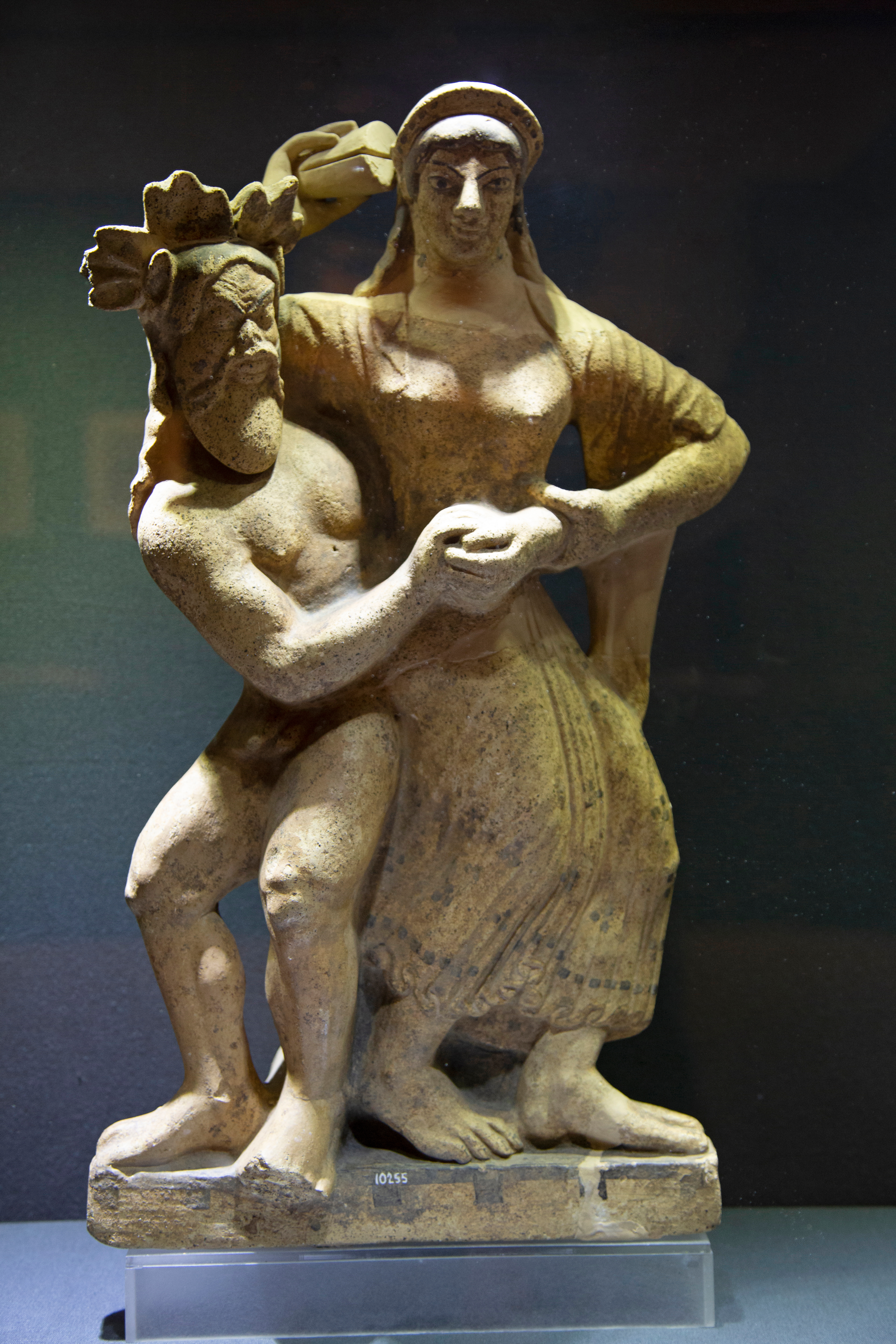
Antefix with Satyr and Maenad dancing from the acropolis, Temple of Mater Matuta, 490-470 BC

Several inscriptions bearing the name of Mater Matuta have now made undisputed the identification of the city on and around the acropolis directly to the south of today's Le Ferriere with ancient Satricum. There remains, however, some discussion on the equation, proposed by C.M. Stibbe, of Satricum with the legendary city of Suessa Pometia.

The sanctuary on top of the Acropolis was re-excavated in 1978–1981. Metrological analyses by Prof. J. de Waele, published in 1981, convincingly demonstrated a succession of three building phases dated from the late 7th to the early 5th century BC. Further investigations in the subsoil showed a particularly large, rather isolated hut to have preceded them, possibly with a religious function. Evidence for a large number of other huts of various shapes testifies to a concentrated use of the acropolis during Latial periods II-IV (1000 - 580 BC).

The three temples succeeding one another are characterized by Etrusco-Ionian, Campanian, and central-Italic traditions, respectively, in material, technology, and artistic background, evidencing the character of Satricum as a true crossroads of regionally competing, or successive, cultures. The discovery, in 1977, of the Lapis Satricanus re-used in the foundations of the last temple and bore the name Publius Valerius (possibly to be identified with Publius Valerius Poplicola), perhaps confirms to the political connections between Satricum and Republican Rome.

The Archaic Period at Satricum is evidenced by several large courtyard buildings on and at the foot of the acropolis. To the NE, a network of large roads, amongst which a "Sacra Via", in combination with a dense urban build-up, has been traced, documenting various phases from the 6th to 4th century BC.

Among the more surprising recent (1981) findings is a large necropolis dated to the 5th and 4th century BC, within the agger in the SW corner of the Archaic city. The material culture of the populace buried here, yielding i.a. a rare inscription on a lead miniature axe bearing the inscription iukus|ko|efiei shows strong connections with the Volscian traditions best known from the interior regions of the Apennine Peninsula. In fact, the discovery corroborates the historical traditions of the Volscians conquering Satricum in 488 BC. Tombs of this kind have successively been found both on the very top of the acropolis and intermixed with the remains of roads in the NW city area.

In addition to ongoing fieldwork, the storerooms and archives of the Villa Giulia Museum have gradually become accessible for advanced research. Thus, the precise details are now known of the circumstances that led to the first excavation campaign by Graillot, the Italian government's intervention, and the subsequent neglect of the Satricum objects in the Villa Giulia. In addition, many object categories have now been properly studied and published (finds from the Archaic Votive Deposit, from the Orientalising and Archaic necropolises to the NE of the city, and the architectural terracottas of the sanctuary).

== Site museum ==
The former iron mill and strawboard factory at Le Ferriere, situated at the foot of the ancient acropolis, has been renovated in recent years as part of the provincial "Parco Satricum" project to house the exhibition Satricum: Scavi e reperti archeologici, which opened in June 2014. This ongoing show displays about 700 artefacts illustrating the history of Satricum from its beginnings to its decline. The organizers intend to make the temporary exhibition space into an official site museum.

== Support structure ==
In the Netherlands, the research project has been supported, since 1981, by a private ngo, the 'Stichting Nederlands Studiecentrum voor Latium'(Foundation Dutch Study Center for Latium), and also, since 1994, by the Vereniging van Vrienden van Satricum (Association of Friends of Satricum), which holds a yearly popular congress, on the last Saturday in January, in Amsterdam: the 'Satricumdag' (Satricum Day). In Italy, various private initiatives are actively supporting the Satricum research.

== Bibliography ==
=== Monographs, dissertations, congresses ===
- C.M. Stibbe et al., Lapis Satricanus. Archaeological, Epigraphical, Linguistic and Historical Aspects of the New Inscription from Satricum, The Hague 1980
- M. Maaskant-Kleibrink et al., Settlement Excavations at Borgo Le Ferriere (“Satricum”)I-II, Groningen 1987 and 1992
- R.R. Knoop, Antefixa Satricana. Sixth-century Architectural Terracottas from the Sanctuary of Mater Matuta at Satricum (Le Ferriere), Wolfsboro/Assen 1987
- M. Gnade, The Southwest Necropolis of Satricum. Excavations 1981-1986, Amsterdam 1992
- D.J. Waarsenburg, The Northwest Necropolis of Satricum. An Iron Age Cemetery in Latium Vetus, Amsterdam 1995
- B. Ginge, Excavations at Satricum, Borgo Le Ferriere, 1907-1910: Northwest Necropolis, Southwest Sanctuary and Acropolis, Amsterdam 1996
- P.S. Lulof, The Ridge-Pole Statues from the Late Archaic Temple at Satricum (Le Ferriere), Amsterdam 1996
- J.W. Bouma, Religio Votiva: the Archaeology of Latial Votive Religion, Groningen 1996
- A.J. Nijboer, From Household Production to Workshops. Archaeological Evidence for Economic Transformations, Pre-Monetary Exchange and Urbanisation in Central Italy from 800 to 400 BC, Groningen 1998
- M. Gnade, Satricum in the Post-Archaic Period. A case study of the interpretation of archaeological remains as indicators of ethno-cultural identity, Leuven 2002
- Proceedings of the Satricum Centennial Congress (1887-1997) in: Mededelingen van het Nederlands Instituut te Rome/Antiquity, LVI (1997) 1-204
- Lemma "Satricum" in the Enciclopedia dell'Arte Antica, Classica e Orientale, Suppl. II.V (1997) 177-180

=== Excavation updates ===
Preliminary reports have been appearing frequently since 1978 in the scholarly periodicals Archeologia Laziale, Bulletin Vereniging Antieke Beschaving, Mededelingen van het Nederlands Instituut te Rome and Lazio & Sabina.

=== Popular books by the Netherlands Study Center for Latium ===
- B. Heldring, Satricum. Een stad in Latium / Satricum. Una città del Lazio / Satricum. A Town in Latium, Hollandse Rading 1985 (rev. 1989) /Latina 1987, Meppel 1989
- C. Stibbe, Satricum en de Volsken / Satricum ed i Volsci, Hollandse Rading 1985 / Meppel 1991
- H. S. Versnel, Satricum en Rome. De inscriptie van Satricum en de vroeg Romeinse geschiedenis / Satricum e Roma. L'iscrizione di Satricum e la storia romana arcaica, Hollandse Rading 1985 / Meppel 1990
- D. Waarsenburg, Satricum, Kroniek van een opgravìng / Satricum. Cronaca di uno scavo. Ricerche archeologiche alla fine dell'Ottocento, Tonden 1996 / Rome 1998
- P.S. Lulof, R.R. Knoop, Satricum. Tempels en daken Meppel 1998

=== Exhibitions ===
- Satricum una città Latina, Exhibition catalogue Latina 1982, Florence 1982
- Nieuw licht op een oude stad. Italiaanse en Nederlandse opgravingen in Satricum, Exhibition catalogue Leiden/Nijmegen 1985, The Hague/Rome 1985
- Area sacra di Satricum tra scavo e restituzione, Exhibition catalogue Albano Laziale 1985, Rome 1985
