= Lucretia =

Late 6th century BC Roman noblewoman

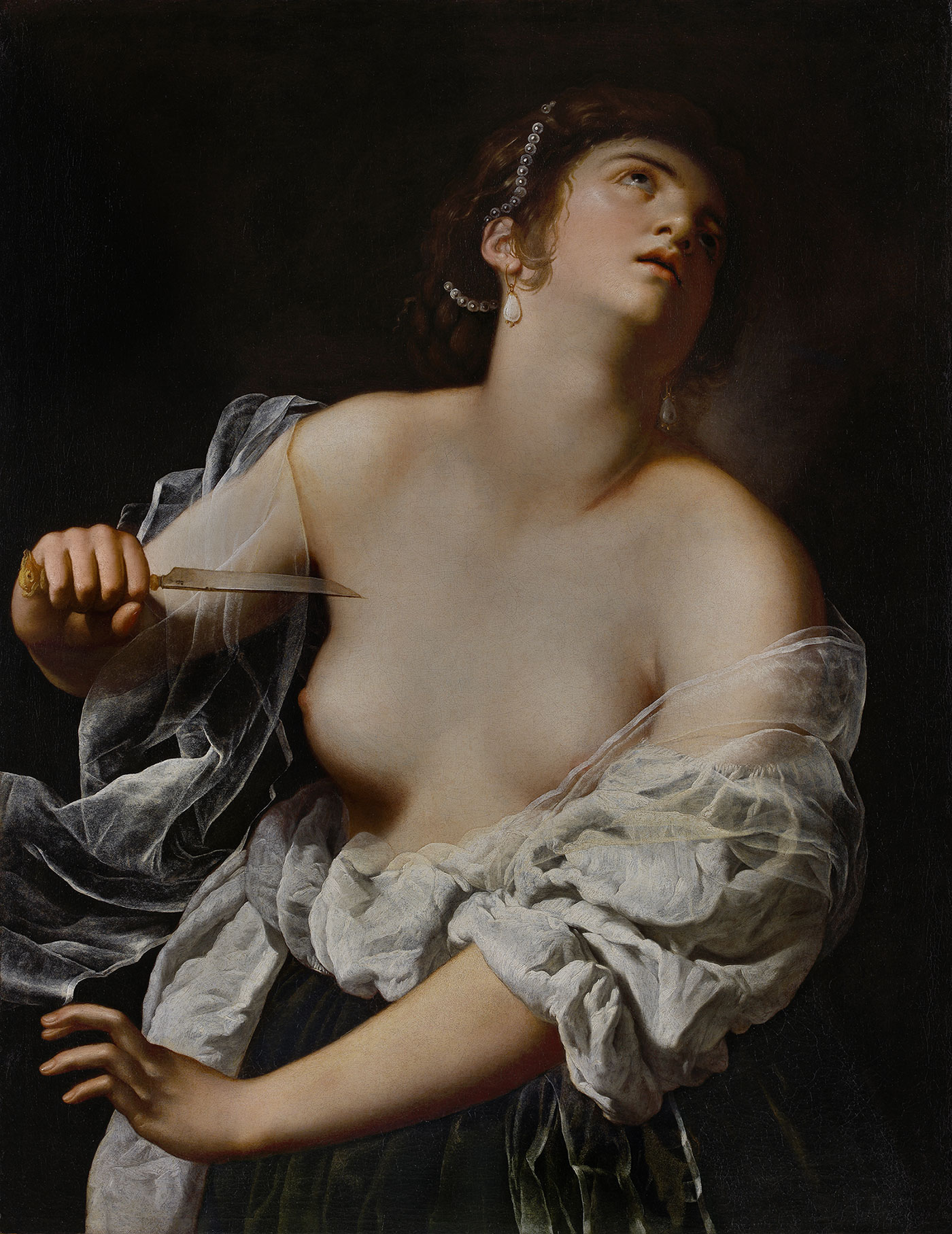
- Lucretia by Artemisia Gentileschi, c. 1627
- Died: c. 510 BC
- Cause of death: Suicide
- Known for: Precipitating the overthrow of the Roman monarchy
- Spouse: Lucius Tarquinius Collatinus
- Father: Spurius Lucretius Tricipitinus

According to Roman tradition, Lucretia (/luːˈkriːʃə/ loo-KREE-shə, Classical Latin: [ɫʊˈkreːtia]; died c. 510 BC), anglicized as Lucrece, was a noblewoman in ancient Rome. Sextus Tarquinius (Tarquin), the king's son, raped Lucretia, and her subsequent suicide precipitated a rebellion that overthrew the Roman monarchy and led to the transition of Roman government from a kingdom to a republic. After Tarquin raped Lucretia, flames of dissatisfaction were kindled over the tyrannical methods of Tarquin's father, Lucius Tarquinius Superbus, the last king of Rome. As a result, the prominent families instituted a republic, drove the extensive royal family of Tarquin from Rome, and successfully defended the republic against attempted Etruscan and Latin intervention.

There are no contemporaneous sources of Lucretia and Tarquin’s rape of her. Information regarding Lucretia, how and when Tarquin raped her, her suicide, and the consequence of this being the start of the Roman Republic come from the accounts of Roman historian Livy and Greco-Roman historian Dionysius of Halicarnassus approximately 500 years later. Secondary sources on the establishment of the republic reiterate the basic events of Lucretia's story, though accounts vary slightly between historians. The evidence points to the historical existence of a woman named Lucretia and an event that played a critical role in the downfall of the monarchy. However, specific details are debatable and vary depending on the writer. According to modern sources, Lucretia's narrative is considered a part of Roman mythohistory. Much like the rape of the Sabine women, Lucretia's story provides an explanation for historical change in Rome through a recounting of violence against women by men.

== Early life and marriage ==
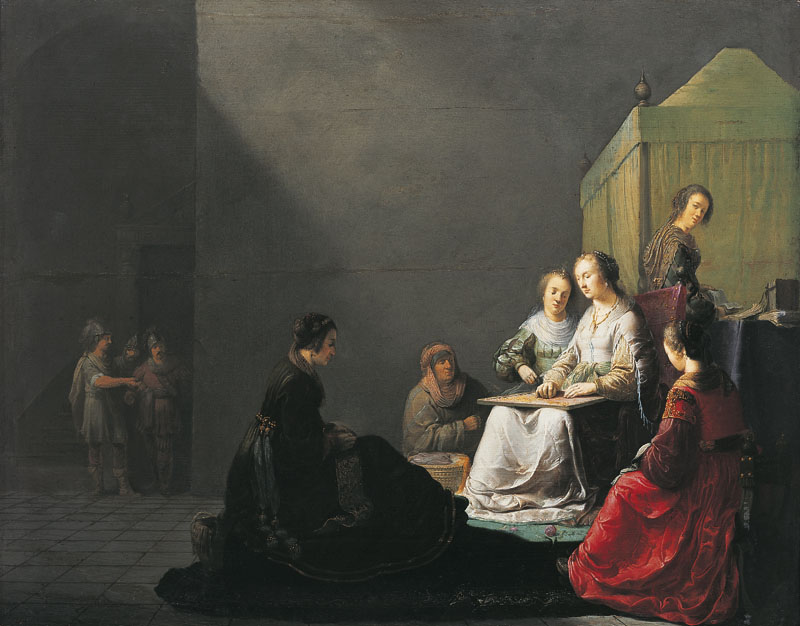
Willem de Poorter's Lucrèce à l'ouvrage (1633), a less common depiction of Lucretia weaving with her ladies

Lucretia was the daughter of magistrate Spurius Lucretius and the wife of Lucius Tarquinius Collatinus. The marriage between Lucretia and Collatinus was depicted as the ideal Roman union, as both Lucretia and Collatinus were faithfully devoted to one another. According to Livy, Lucretia was an exemplar of "beauty and purity," as well as Roman standards. While her husband was away at battle, Lucretia would stay at home and pray for his safe return. As with Livy, Dionysius' depiction of Lucretia separates her from the rest of Roman women in a story about the men returning home from a battle. The narrative begins with a bet between the sons of Tarquinius and their kinsmen, Brutus and Collatinus. The men fight over which of their wives best exemplified sophrosyne, an ideal of superb moral and intellectual character. The men return home to find the women socializing with each other, presumably in conversation. By contrast, they find Lucretia home alone, working with her wool in silence. Because of her devotion to her husband, Roman writers Livy and Dionysius outline Lucretia as the role model for Roman girls.

== Rape ==
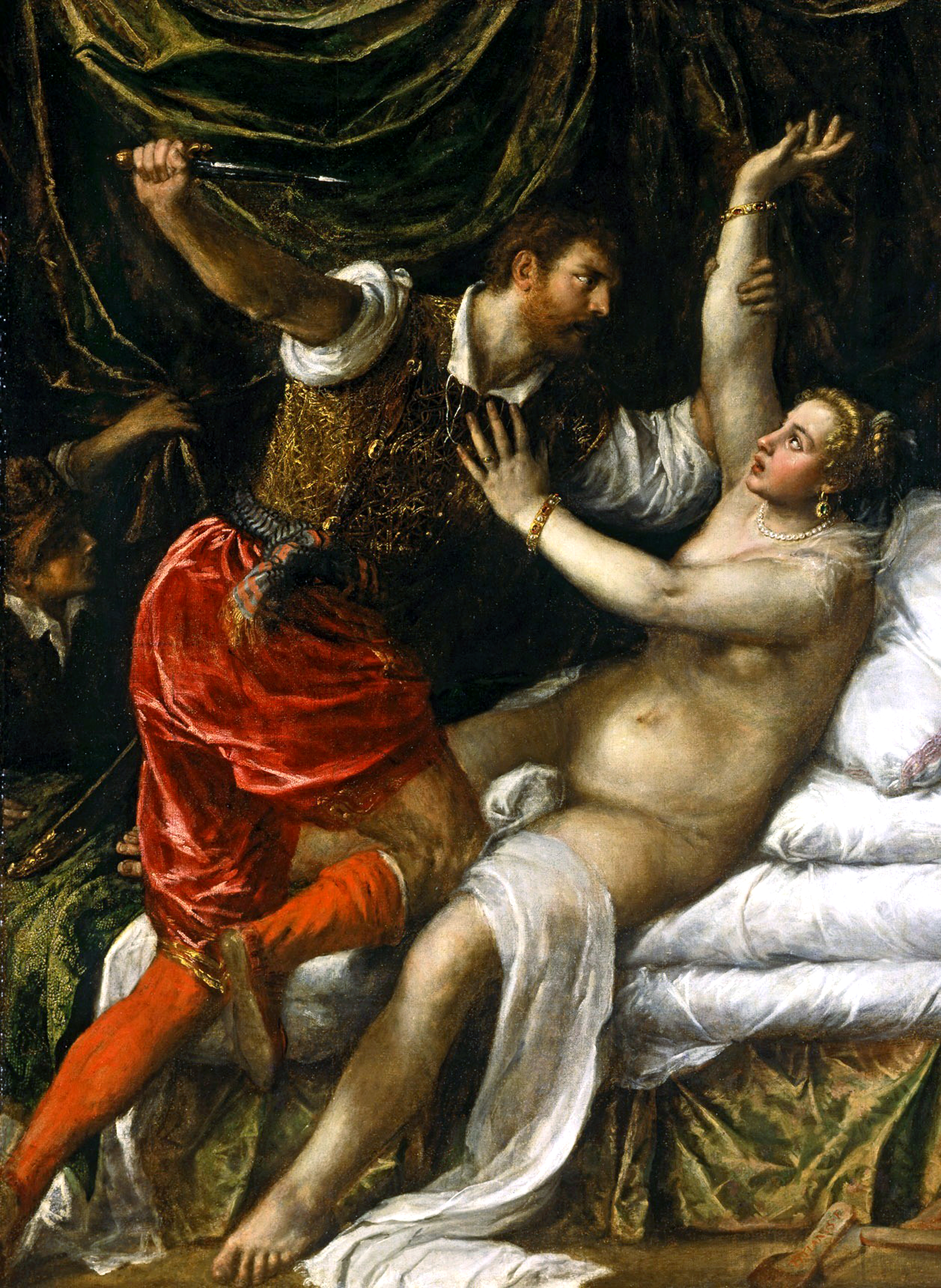
Titian's Tarquin and Lucretia (1571), a depiction of Lucretia's rape by Sextus Tarquinius

As the events of the story move rapidly, the date that Tarquin raped Lucretia is most likely the same year as the first of the fasti. Dionysius of Halicarnassus sets this year "at the beginning of the sixty-eighth Olympiad ... Isagoras being the annual archon at Athens"; that is, 508/507 BC. According to Dionysius, Lucretia therefore died in 508 BC. This approximate date is met with consensus by other historians; however, the exact year is debatable within a range of about five years.

While engaged in the siege of Ardea, Lucius Tarquinius Superbus, the last king of Rome, sent his son, Tarquin, on a military errand to Collatia. Tarquin was received with great hospitality at the governor's mansion, home of Lucius Tarquinius Collatinus, son of the king's cousin, Arruns Tarquinius, former governor of Collatia and first of the Tarquinii Collatini. Spurius Lucretius, father of Collatinus' wife Lucretia and prefect of Rome, made sure that the king's son was treated as a guest and a figure of his rank.

In a variant of the story, Tarquin and Collatinus, at a wine party on furlough, were debating the virtues of wives when Collatinus volunteered to settle the debate. In order to do so, he proposed riding to his home to observe Lucretia. Upon their arrival, she was weaving with her maids. The party awarded her the palm of victory and Collatinus invited them to stay, but for the time being they returned to camp.

Later in the night, Tarquin entered Lucretia's bedroom, quietly avoiding the slaves who were sleeping at her door. When she awoke, he identified himself and offered her two choices: he would rape her and she would become his wife and future queen, or he would kill her and one of her slaves, place the bodies together, and claim he had caught her having adulterous sex (see sexuality in ancient Rome for Roman attitudes toward sex). In the alternative story, he returned from camp a few days later with one companion to take Collatinus up on his invitation to visit and was lodged in a guest bedroom. He entered Lucretia's room while she lay naked in her bed and started to wash her belly with water, which woke her up. Tarquin tried to convince Lucretia that she should be with him, using "every argument likely to influence a female heart." However, Lucretia stood firm in her devotion to her husband, even when Tarquin threatened her life and honor, while ultimately raping her.

== Suicide ==
=== The account of Dionysius of Halicarnassus ===
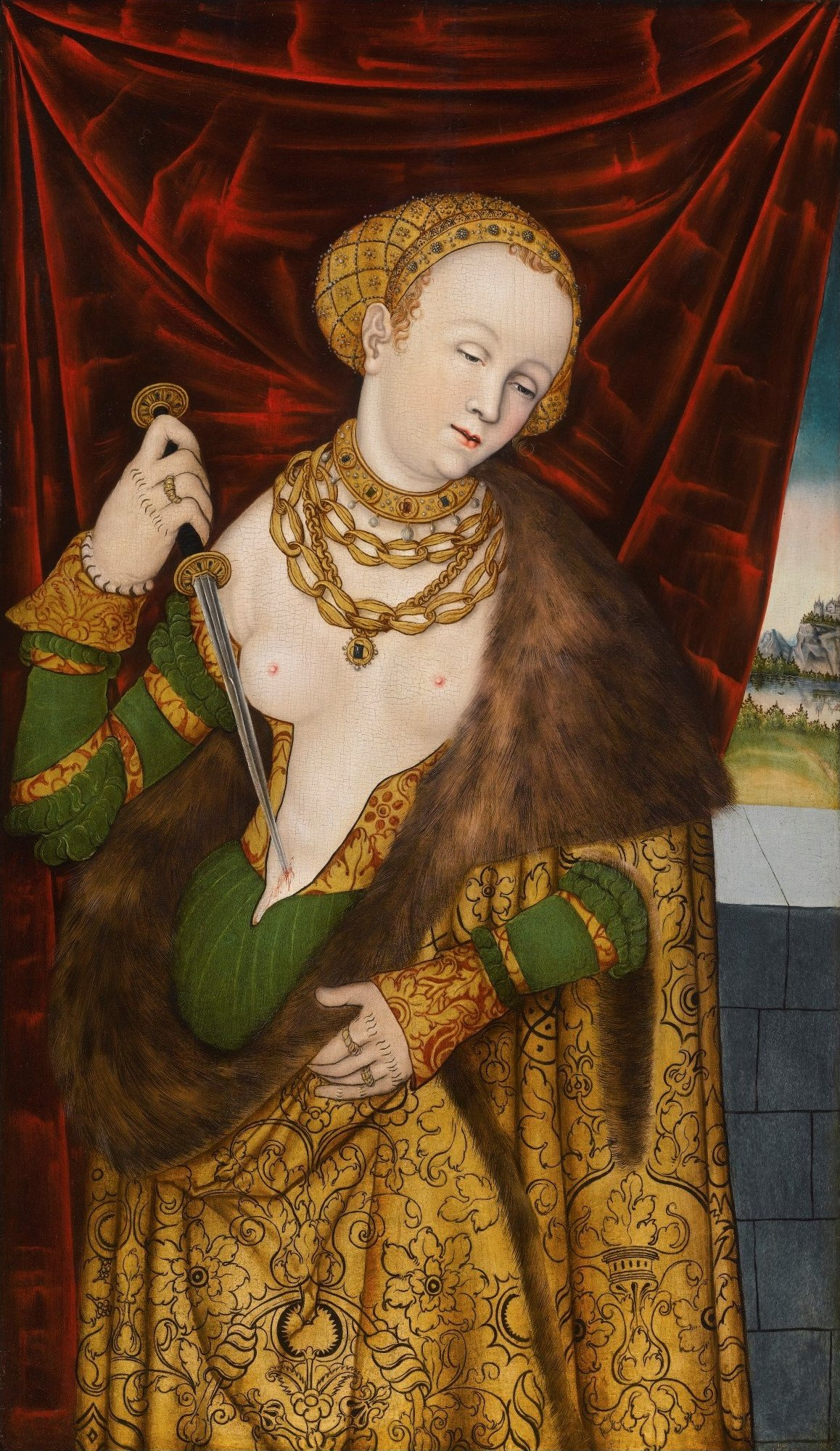
Lucrecia, 1525, Monogrammist I.W. active in the Cranach studio c. 1520–1540. Lucretia wielding a dagger before her suicide.

In Dionysius of Halicarnassus' account, the following day Lucretia dressed in black and went to her father's house in Rome and cast herself down in the supplicant's position (embracing the knees), weeping in front of her father and husband. She asked to explain herself and insisted on summoning witnesses before she told them about her rape. After disclosing that Tarquin had raped her, she asked them for vengeance, a plea that could not be ignored because she was speaking to the chief magistrate of Rome. While the men debated the proper course of action, Lucretia drew a concealed dagger and stabbed herself in the heart. She died in her father's arms, while the women present lamented her death. According to Dionysius, "This dreadful scene struck the Romans who were present with so much horror and compassion that they all cried out with one voice that they would rather die a thousand deaths in defense of their liberty than suffer such outrages to be committed by the tyrants."

=== The account of Livy ===
In Livy's version, Lucretia acts quickly and calmly, deciding not to go to Rome, but instead sends for her father and her husband, asking them to bring one friend each to act as a witness. Those selected were Publius Valerius Publicola from Rome and Lucius Junius Brutus from the camp at Ardea. Once the men found Lucretia in her room, her explanation of Tarquin’s rape of her leads the men to state that "it is the mind that sins, not the body, and where there has been no consent there is no guilt." After exacting an oath of vengeance while the men were discussing the matter—"Pledge me your solemn word that the adulterer shall not go unpunished"— Lucretia drew a poignard and stabbed herself in her heart.

=== The account of Dio ===
In Dio's version, Lucretia's request for revenge is: "And, whereas I (for I am a woman) shall act in a manner which is fitting for me: you, if you are men, and if you care for your wives and children, exact vengeance on my behalf and free your selves and show the tyrants what sort of woman they outraged, and what sort of men were her menfolk!" She follows her statement by plunging the dagger into her chest and promptly dying.

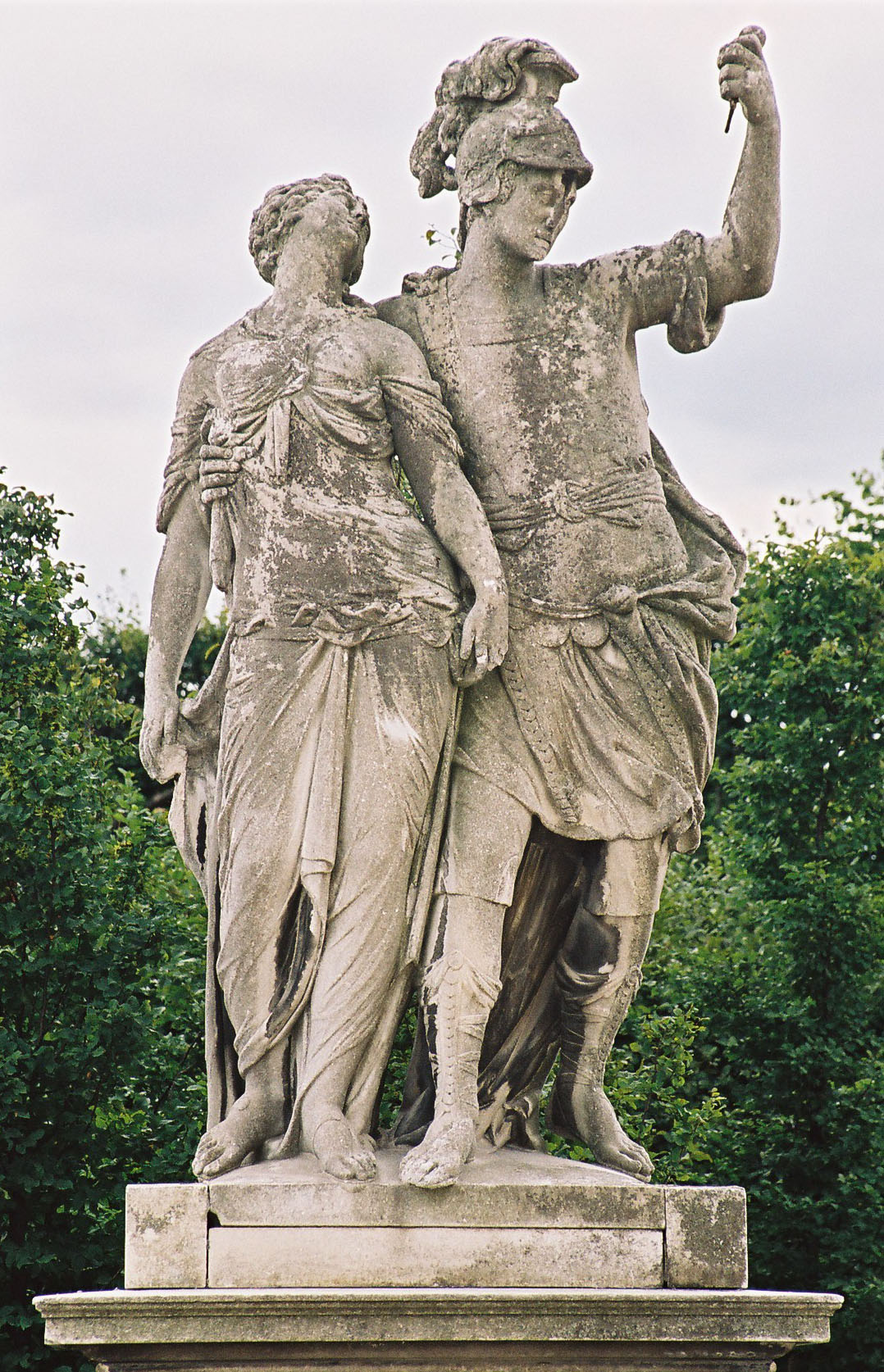
The less common subject of Brutus holding the dead Lucretia and swearing the oath

In this version, Collatinus and Brutus were encountered returning to Rome unaware of Tarquin's rape of Lucretia, were briefed, and were brought to the death scene. Brutus happened to be a politically motivated participant. By kinship he was a Tarquin on his mother's side, the son of Tarquinia, daughter of Lucius Tarquinius Priscus, the third king before last. He was a candidate for the throne if anything should happen to Superbus. By law, however, because he was a Junius on his father's side, he was thus not a Tarquin and therefore could later propose the exile of the Tarquins without fear for himself. Superbus had taken his inheritance and left him a pittance, keeping him at court for entertainment.

Collatinus, seeing his wife dead, became distraught. He held her, kissed her, called her name and spoke to her. Dio stated that after seeing the hand of Destiny in these events, Brutus called the grieving party to order, explained that his simplicity had been a sham, and proposed that they drive the Tarquins from Rome. Grasping the bloody dagger, he swore by Mars and all the other gods that he would do everything in his power to overthrow the dominion of the Tarquinii. He stated that he would neither be reconciled to the tyrants himself, nor tolerate any who should be reconciled to them, but would look upon every man who thought otherwise as an enemy, and til his death would pursue with unrelenting hatred both the tyranny and its abettors; and if he should violate his oath, he prayed that he and his children might meet with the same end as Lucretia.

He passed the dagger around and each mourner swore the same oath by it. The primary sources of both Dio and Livy agree on this point: Livy's version is:

By this blood—most pure before the outrage wrought by the king's son—I swear, and you, O gods, I call to witness that I will drive hence Lucius Tarquinius Superbus, together with his cursed wife and his whole blood, with fire and sword and every means in my power, and I will not suffer them or anyone else to reign in Rome.

== Revolution ==
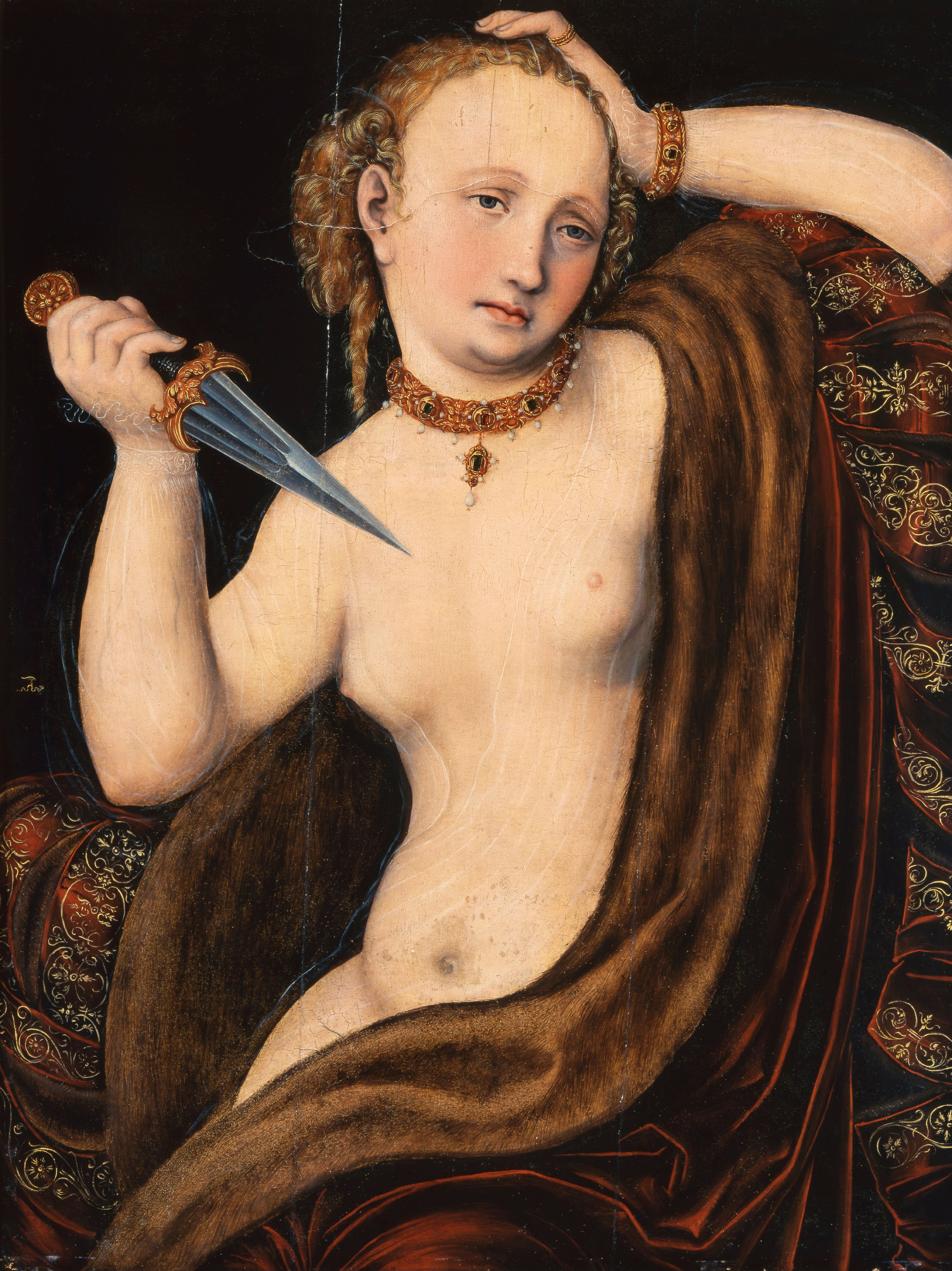
Lucretia by Lucas Cranach the Elder

The newly sworn revolutionary committee paraded the bloody corpse of Lucretia to the Roman Forum where it remained on display as a reminder of the dishonor committed. At the forum, the committee heard grievances against the Tarquins and began to enlist an army to abolish the monarchy. Brutus "urged them to act as men and Romans and take up arms against their insolent foes" in response to the death of a dutiful wife. The gates of Rome were blockaded by the new revolutionary soldiers and more were sent to guard Collatia. By now a crowd had gathered in the forum; the presence of the magistrates among the revolutionaries kept them in good order.

Brutus was the Tribune of the Celeres, a minor office of some religious duties, which as a magistracy gave him the theoretical power to summon the curiae, an organization of patrician families used mainly to ratify the decrees of the king. Summoning them on the spot, he transformed the crowd into an authoritative legislative assembly and began to address them in one of the more noted and effective speeches of ancient Rome.

He began by revealing that his pose as a fool was a sham designed to protect him against an evil king. He levelled a number of charges against the king and his family: Tarquin’s rape of Lucretia, whom everyone could see on the dais, the king's tyranny, the forced labor of the plebeians in the ditches and sewers of Rome. In his speech, he pointed out that Superbus had come to rule by the murder of Servius Tullius, his wife's father, next-to-the-last king of Rome. He "solemnly invoked the gods as the avengers of murdered parents." He suggested that the king's wife, Tullia, was in fact in Rome and probably was a witness to the proceedings from her palace near the forum. Seeing herself the target of so much animosity, she fled from the palace in fear of her life and proceeded to the camp at Ardea.

Brutus opened a debate on the form of government Rome ought to have, a debate at which many patricians spoke. In summation, he proposed the banishment of the Tarquins from all the territories of Rome and the appointment of an interrex to nominate new magistrates and conduct an election of ratification. They decided on a republican form of government with two consuls in place of a king executing the will of a patrician senate. This was a temporary measure until they could consider the details more carefully. Brutus renounced all right to the throne. In subsequent years, the powers of the king were divided among various elected magistracies.

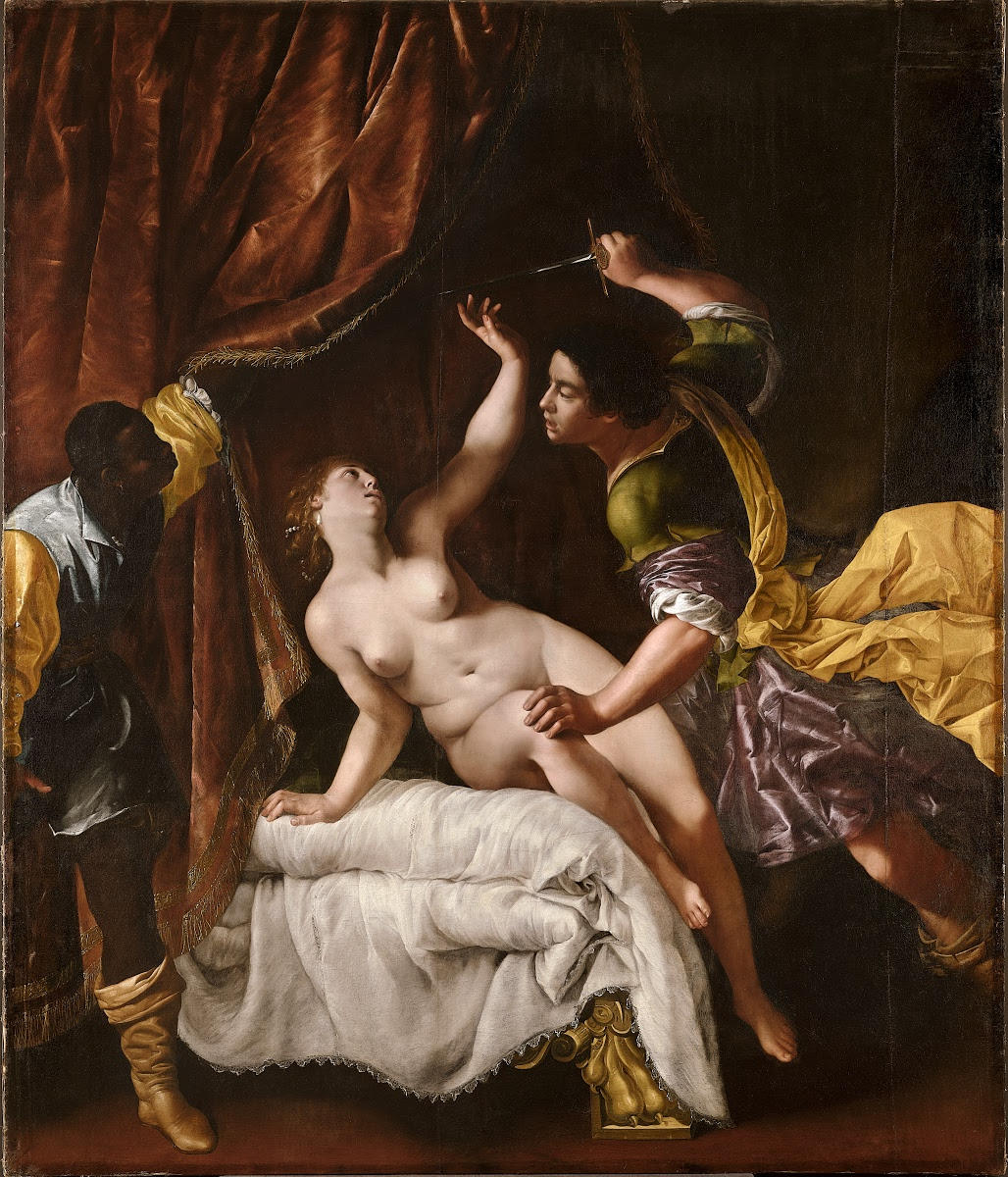
The rape, by Artemisia Gentileschi

A final vote of the curiae carried the interim constitution. Spurius Lucretius was swiftly elected interrex; he was prefect of the city already. He proposed Brutus and Collatinus as the first two consuls and that choice was ratified by the curiae. Needing to acquire the assent of the population as a whole, they paraded Lucretia through the streets, summoning the plebeians to a legal assembly in the forum. Once there, they heard a constitutional speech by Brutus. It began:

In as much as Tarquinius neither obtained the sovereignty in accordance with our ancestral customs and laws, nor, since he obtained it—in whatever manner he got it—has he been exercising it in an honourable or kingly manner, but has surpassed in insolence and lawlessness all the tyrants the world ever saw, we patricians met together and resolved to deprive him of his power, a thing we ought to have done long ago, but are doing now when a favourable opportunity has offered. And we have called you together, plebeians, in order to declare our own decision and then ask for your assistance in achieving liberty for our country ....

A general election was held and the vote won in favor of the republic. This ended the monarchy, and during these proceedings Lucretia was still displayed in the forum.

The constitutional consequences of this event ended the reign of the hereditary king; however, later emperors were absolute rulers in all but name. This constitutional tradition prevented both Julius Caesar and Octavian Augustus from accepting a crown; instead, they had to devise a confluence of several republican offices onto their persons in order to secure absolute power. Their successors both in Rome and in Constantinople adhered to this tradition in essence, and the office of German Holy Roman Emperor remained elective rather than hereditary—up to its abolition in the Napoleonic Wars, over 2300 years later.

== In literature and music ==
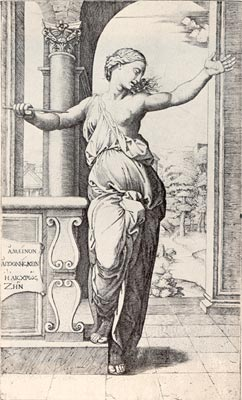
Marcantonio Raimondi's 1534 engraving of her suicide

Lucretia became an important embodiment of political and literary ideals for different authors throughout the ages, specifically because "stories of sexual violence against women serve as foundational myths of Western culture."

Livy's account in Ab Urbe Condita Libri (c. 25–8 BC) is the earliest surviving full historical treatment. In his account, her husband has boasted of the virtue of his wife to Tarquin and others. Livy contrasts the virtue of the Roman Lucretia, who remained in her room weaving, with the Etruscan ladies who feasted with friends. Ovid recounts the story of Lucretia in Book II of his Fasti, published in 8 AD, concentrating on the bold over-reaching character of Tarquin. Later, St. Augustine made use of the figure of Lucretia in The City of God (published 426 AD) to defend the honour of Christian women who had been raped in the sack of Rome and had not committed suicide.

The story of Lucretia was a popular moral tale in the later Middle Ages. Lucretia appears to Dante in the section of Limbo, reserved for the nobles of Rome and other "virtuous pagans", in Canto IV of the Inferno. Christine de Pizan used Lucretia, just as St. Augustine of Hippo did, in her City of Ladies, defending a woman's sanctity.

The myth is recounted in Geoffrey Chaucer's The Legend of Good Women, and it follows a similar storyline to Livy's. Lucretia calls for her father and husband, but Chaucer's tale also has her call for her mother and attendants as well, whereas Livy's has both her father and husband bring a friend as witness. The tale also deviates from Livy's account, as it begins with her husband coming home to surprise her, rather than the men placing a bet on the virtue of their wives.

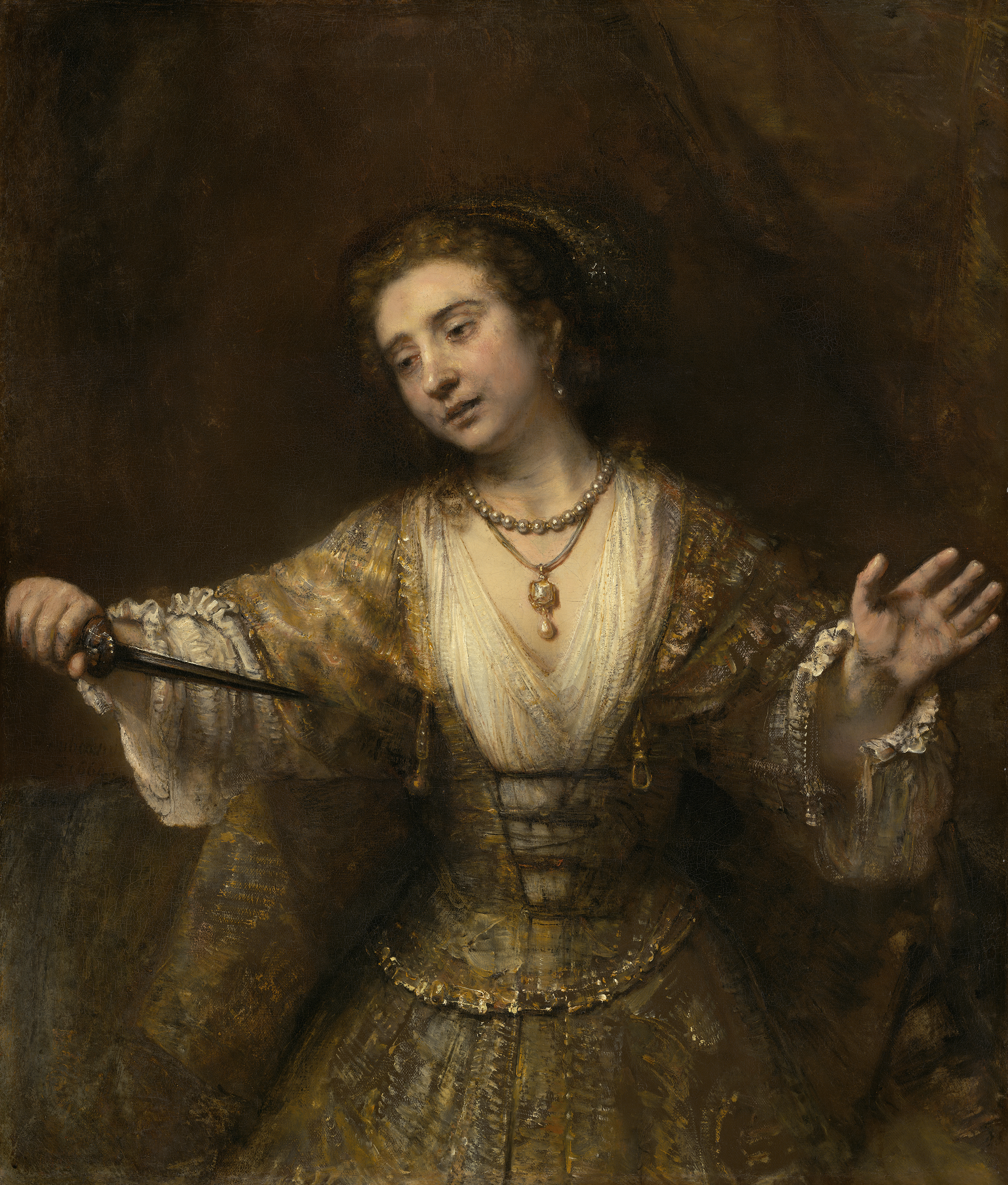
Lucretia, by Rembrandt (1664). This painting follows the likes of other iconic depictions: Lucretia clutching the dagger moments before she takes her own life.

John Gower's Confessio Amantis (Book VII), and John Lydgate's Fall of Princes recount the myth of Lucretia. Gower's work is a collection of narrative poems. In Book VII, he tells the "Tale of the Rape of Lucrece." Lydgate's work is a long poem containing stories and myths about various kings and princes who fell from power. It follows their lives from their rise into power and their fall into adversity. Lydgate's poem mentions the fall of Tarquin, the rape and suicide of Lucretia, and her speech prior to death.

Lucretia's rape and suicide is also the subject of William Shakespeare's 1594 long poem The Rape of Lucrece, which draws extensively on Ovid's treatment of the story; he also mentions her in Titus Andronicus, in As You Like It, and in Twelfth Night, wherein Malvolio authenticates his fateful letter by spotting Olivia's Lucrece seal. Shakespeare also alludes to her in Macbeth, and in Cymbeline he further refers to the story, though without mentioning Lucretia by name. Shakespeare's poem, based on the rape of Lucretia, draws on the beginning of the Livy's account of the incident. The poem begins with a bet between husbands about the virtuousness of their wives. Shakespeare draws on the idea of Lucretia as a moral agent, as Livy did, when he explores his characters' response to death and her unwillingness to yield to her rapist. A direct excerpt from Livy is used when Shakespeare prefaces his poem with a brief prose called "Argument". This is the internal deliberation Lucrece suffered from, following the rape.

Niccolò Machiavelli's comedy La Mandragola is loosely based on the Lucretia story.

She is also mentioned in the poem "Appius and Virginia" by John Webster and Thomas Heywood, which includes the following lines:

Two fair, but ladies most infortunate,
Have in their ruins rais'd declining Rome,
Lucretia and Virginia, both renown'd
For chastity.

Thomas Heywood's play The Rape of Lucretia dates from 1607. The subject also enjoyed a revival in the mid twentieth century; André Obey's 1931 play Le Viol de Lucrèce was adapted by librettist Ronald Duncan for The Rape of Lucretia, a 1946 opera by Benjamin Britten which premiered at Glyndebourne. Obey's play was also the basis for Thornton Wilder's play Lucrece with incidental music by Deems Taylor which was staged on Broadway in 1932. Ernst Krenek set Emmet Lavery's libretto Tarquin (1940), a version in a contemporary setting.

Jacques Gallot (died c. 1690) composed the allemandes "Lucrèce" and "Tarquin" for baroque lute.

In Samuel Richardson's 1740 novel Pamela, Mr. B. cites the story of Lucretia as a reason why Pamela ought not fear for her reputation, should he rape her. Pamela quickly sets him straight with a better reading of the story. Colonial Mexican poet Sor Juana Inés de la Cruz also mentions Lucretia in her poem "Redondillas," a commentary on prostitution and who is to blame.

In 1769, doctor Juan Ramis wrote a tragedy in Menorca entitled Lucrecia. The play is written in the Catalan language using a neoclassical style and is a significant work of the eighteenth century written in this language.

In 1932, the play Lucrece was produced on Broadway, starring legendary actress Katharine Cornell in the title part. It was mostly performed in pantomime.

In 1989, a song entitled "The Rape of Lucretia" was released by the Scottish musician Momus.

In Donna Leon's 2009 Venetian novel, About Face, Franca Marinello refers to the tale of Tarquin and Lucrezia, as recounted in Ovid's Fasti (Book II, for February 24, "Regifugium") to explain her actions to Commissario Brunetti.

American thrash metal band Megadeth used the name Lucretia as the title for the sixth track on their 1990 release Rust In Peace. The song doesn’t have a direct connection to the story of Lucretia, rather Lucretia acting as a muse for Megadeth frontman Dave Mustaine reaching sobriety after a heavy drug and alcohol addiction during the 1980s.

== Subject in art ==
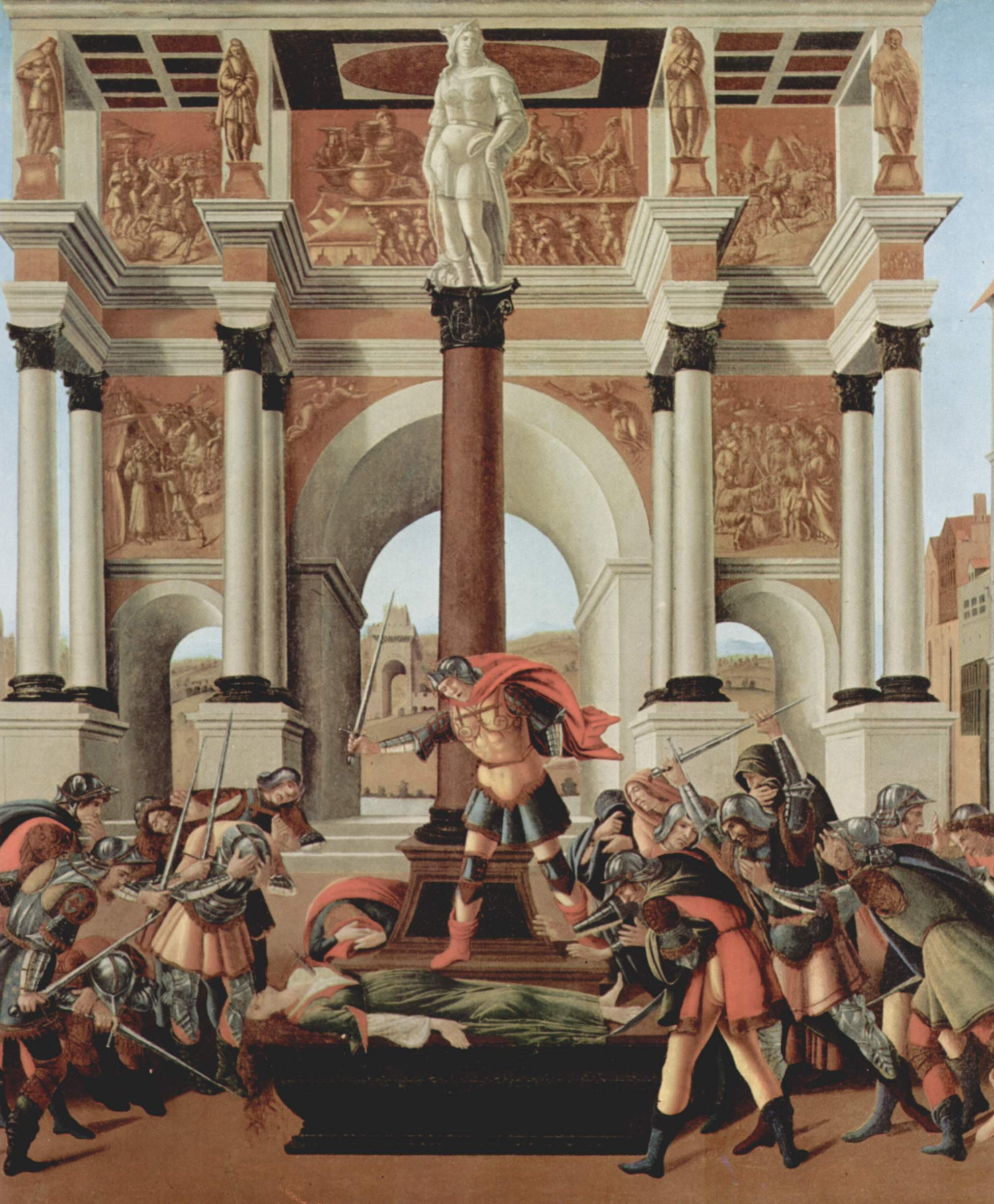
Detail of The Story of Lucretia (c. 1500–01), by Sandro Botticelli. Here citizens with swords are swearing the overthrow of the monarchy.

Since the Renaissance, the suicide of Lucretia has been an enduring subject for visual artists, including Titian, Rembrandt, Dürer, Raphael, Botticelli, Jörg Breu the Elder, Johannes Moreelse, Artemisia Gentileschi, Damià Campeny, Eduardo Rosales, Lucas Cranach the Elder, and others. Most commonly, either the moment of the rape is shown, or Lucretia is shown alone at the moment of her suicide. In either situation, her clothing is loosened or absent, while Tarquin is normally clothed.

The subject was one of a group showing women from legend or the Bible who were either powerless, such as Susanna and Verginia, or only able to escape their situations by suicide, such as Dido of Carthage and Lucretia. These formed a counterpoint to, or sub-group of, the set of subjects known as the Power of Women, showing female violence against, or domination of, men. These were often depicted by the same artists, and especially popular in Northern Renaissance art. The story of Esther lay somewhere between these two extremes.

The subject of Lucretia spinning with her ladies, is sometimes depicted, as in a series of four engravings of her story by Hendrick Goltzius, which also includes a banquet.

Examples with article

- Tarquin and Lucretia— life-size image of the rape by Titian
- The Story of Lucretia (Botticelli)—three scenes, of the rape, Brutus arousing the people, and the suicide
- The Suicide of Lucretia (Dürer)—single figure painting
- Lucretia and her Husband—distinctive depiction of Lucretia with a knife, and a shadowy male figure just behind. He is either Tarquin or her husband. By either Titian or Palma Vecchio.
- Lucretia (Veronese)

== See also ==
- Lucretia gens
- Verginia
- The Rape of the Sabine Women
- Matter of Rome
