= Lucretia (Veronese) =

Painting by Paolo Veronese

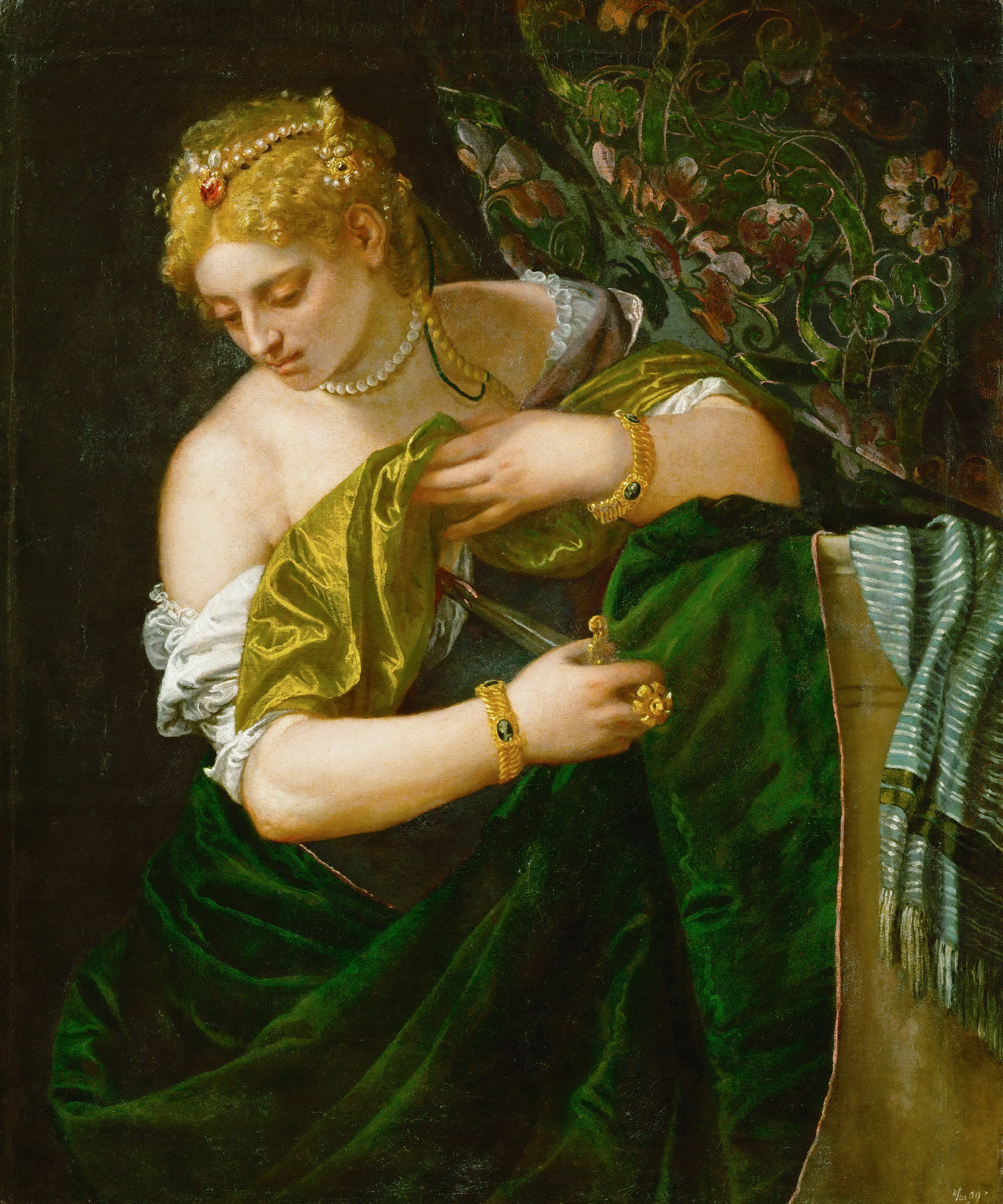
- Artist: Paolo Veronese
- Year: 1580s
- Medium: Oil on canvas
- Dimensions: 109 cm × 90.5 cm (43 in × 35.6 in)
- Location: Kunsthistorisches Museum; Vienna

Lucretia is an oil-on-canvas painting by Paolo Veronese from c.1580-1583. This Venetian painting depicts Lucretia in the act of piercing her chest with a dagger after having been raped by the king’s son Sextus Tarquinius. It is held in the collection of Kunsthistorisches Museum, Vienna, Austria.

A subject of many works of other artists, such as Titian, Rembrandt and Raffaello Sanzio, in Veronese's painting what is striking is the attention to detail, from the drapery that cloaks the figure to her jewels.

== See also ==
- Lucretia
