= Laferrière =

Laferrière (or Laferriere) (pronounced [la.fɛ.ʁjɛʁ]) is a French habitational surname connected to a multitude of settlements called La Ferrière (historically indicating the presence of artisanal mining of iron ore) that is also common in French America.

Notable people with this name include:

- Alex Laferriere (born 2001), American ice hockey player
- Alexandre Laferrière (born 1973), Canadian screenwriter
- Dany Laferrière (born 1953), Haitian-born Canadian novelist, journalist, poet, screenwriter, and filmmaker
- Édouard Laferrière (1841–1901), French lawyer and politician
- Hubert Julien-Laferrière (born 1966), French economist and politician
- Joseph Edward Laferrière (born 1955), American botanist
- Kimberly Laferriere (born 1984), Canadian actor
- Victor Julien-Laferrière (born 1990), French cellist
- Yves Laferrière (1943–2020), Canadian actor and composer

== See also ==
- Ferreira (surname), a related Portuguese surname
- Herrera (surname), a related Spanish surname
