= Lapis Satricanus =

Latin inscription that dates to the late 6th to early 5th centuries BC

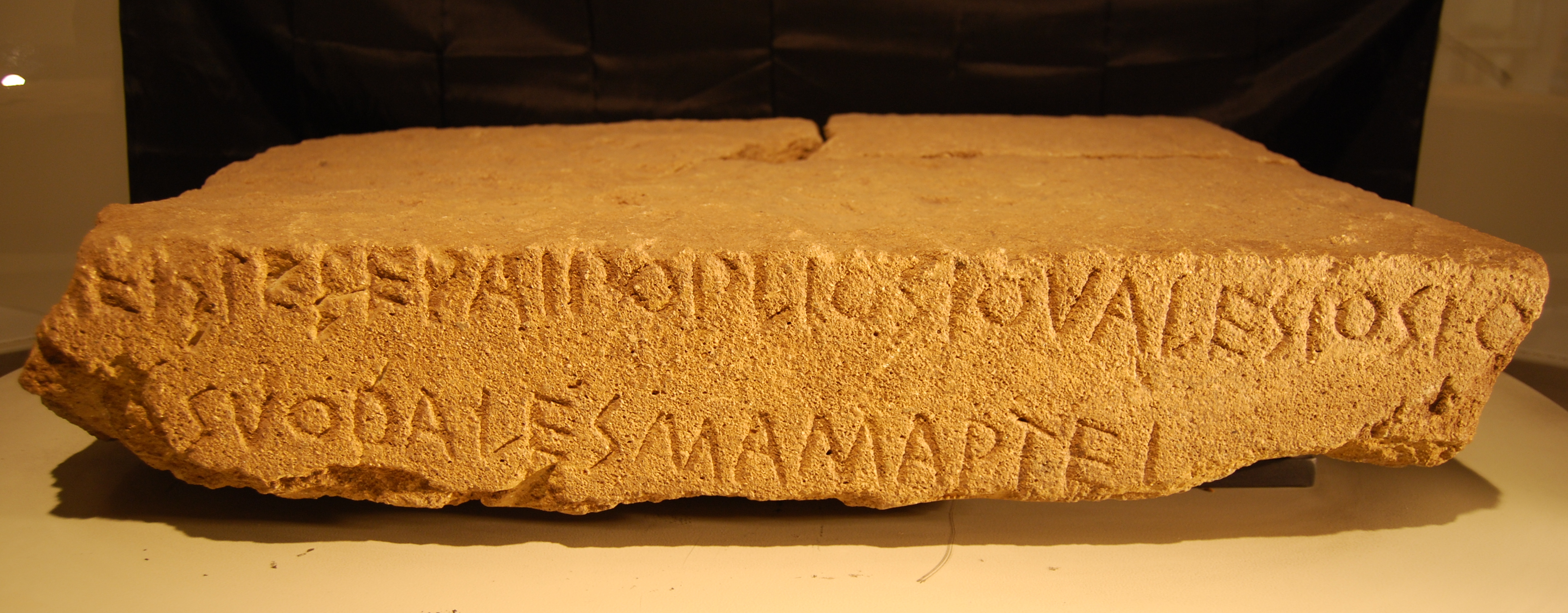
- Material: Stone
- Created: late 6th or early 5th century BC
- Discovered: 1977; Lazio, Italy
- Language: Old Latin

The Lapis Satricanus ("Stone of Satricum"), is a yellow stone found in the ruins of the ancient town of Satricum, near Borgo Montello (41°31′N 12°47′E), a village of southern Lazio, dated late 6th to early 5th centuries BC and carrying an archaic Latin inscription. It was found in 1977 during excavations by C.M. Stibbe, lying in the foundation of the temple of Mater Matuta.

== Historical context ==
The Lapis Satricanus was found in Satricum, a settlement in the region of Latium, dating back to at least the 6th century BCE. This period in Roman history is critical for understanding the transition from the Roman monarchy to the early Republic. Satricum was one of several Latin settlements that played a significant role in the early territorial expansion of Rome and its interactions with neighboring tribes and cities, including the Volsci and the Aequi. The stone bears an ancient Latin inscription that provides evidence for early Latin language use and the socio-political structure of the region during this period.

Linguistically, the inscription sheds light on the development of early Latin epigraphy. It follows forms and structures common to the archaic period, helping linguists trace the evolution of the Latin language. The text also indicates the influence of Roman political power over nearby Latin towns, showing the growing dominance of Rome in the region.

== Content ==
The inscription reads:

(?)IEI STETERAI POPLIOSIO VALESIOSIO
SVODALES MAMARTEI

("The (?) dedicated this, as companions of Publius Valerius, to Mars")

== Points of interest ==
=== Case ending -osio ===
This inscription has attracted attention for several reasons. Its language has been identified as Old Latin or a closely related dialect. It is important for comparative Indo-European grammar, as it is the only Latin inscription to show the ending -osio for the genitive singular of the thematic noun declension. Latin later has -ī as the ending for this case, but by comparison with Sanskrit -asya, Mycenaean Greek -o-io, Homeric Greek -ᾱο and -οιο, and corresponding genitive endings in other Indo-European languages, it becomes clear that -osio is a far earlier form.

=== Usage of suodales ===
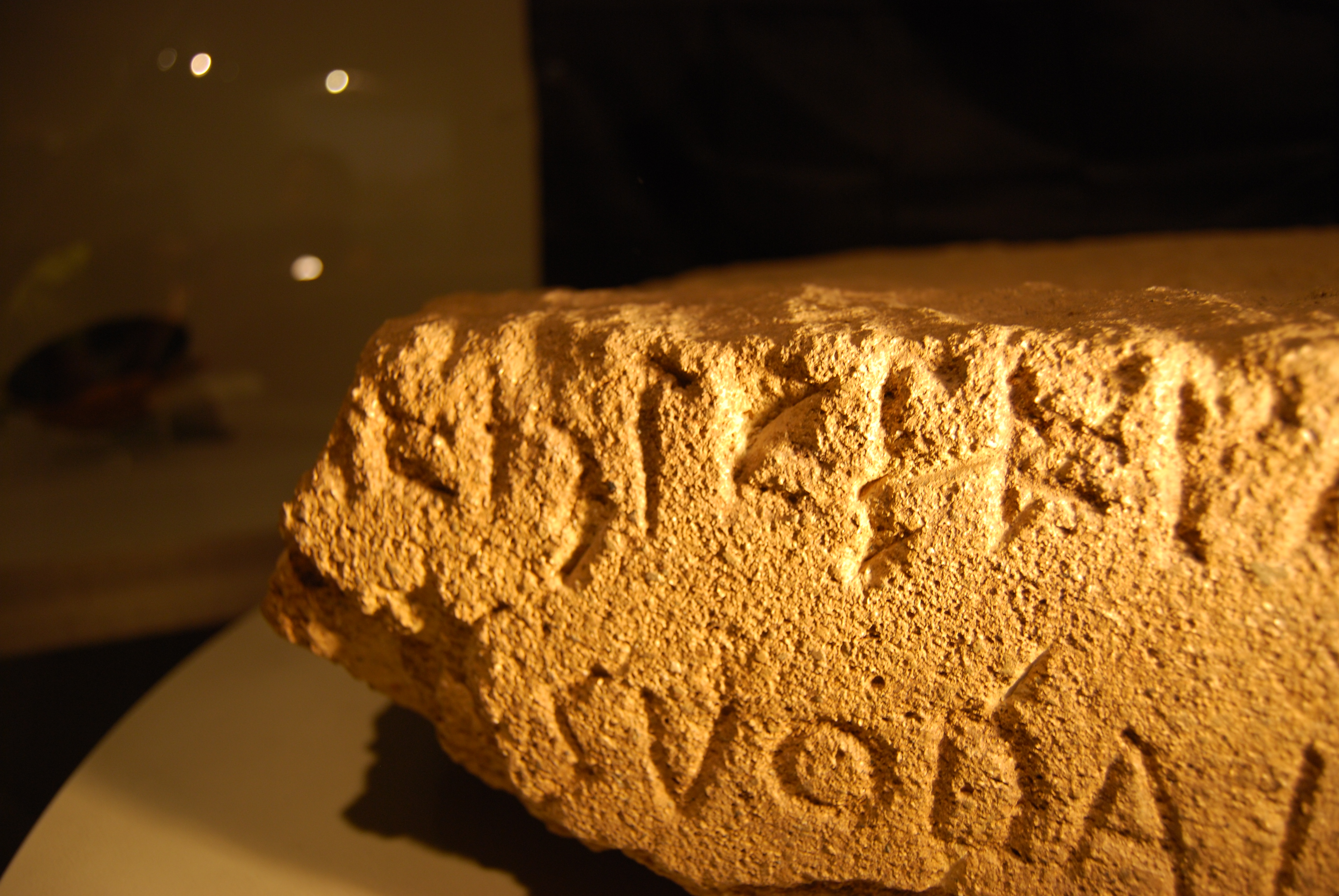
Detail of the Lapis Satricanus

Another point of interest is the presence of the word suodales (Classical Latin sodales). In historic times, this word referred to a member of a sodalitas, a religious fraternity or brotherhood who met for ritual meals or as a burial organization. "Since the suod- element in suodales is cognate with the English word 'swear'", writes Gary Forsythe, "the term suggests that some kind of oath was taken, binding the members of the group together in a common purpose." Forsythe uses this and that this was a dedication to Mars to suggest this indicates the existence of an armed group of sworn followers, similar to "the war bands led by Homeric heroes, the warlike aristocratic companions of the Macedonian kings during the classical period, and the war bands surrounding the Celtic and Germanic chieftains described by Caesar and Tacitus". Forsythe notes this puts a new light on the account of the Battle of the Cremera, an event where the entire gens Fabia fought as a group the armed men of the rival town of Veii only to be tragically defeated.

=== Inscribed name ===
A third point of interest to historians and archaeologists of early Latium is the name preserved on the inscription. The archaic name of Poplios Valesios is rendered in Classical Latin as "Publius Valerius". That has led to speculation that the inscription refers to Publius Valerius Publicola, the patrician ally of Lucius Junius Brutus who dominates the list of early consuls recorded by the Fasti Capitolini and is credited, in traditional accounts, as one of the primary founders of the Roman Republic. Positive identification is at least somewhat problematic because the town of Satricum was not part of Roman territory during the lifetime of Publius Valerius. However, the lapis itself may not have been dedicated in Satricum in the first place since it was found as part of a collection of recycled material used in the construction of a temple in the town, and it could well have been imported from elsewhere.
