= Saint-Pierre-de-Rivière =

Commune in Occitanie, France

- Commune
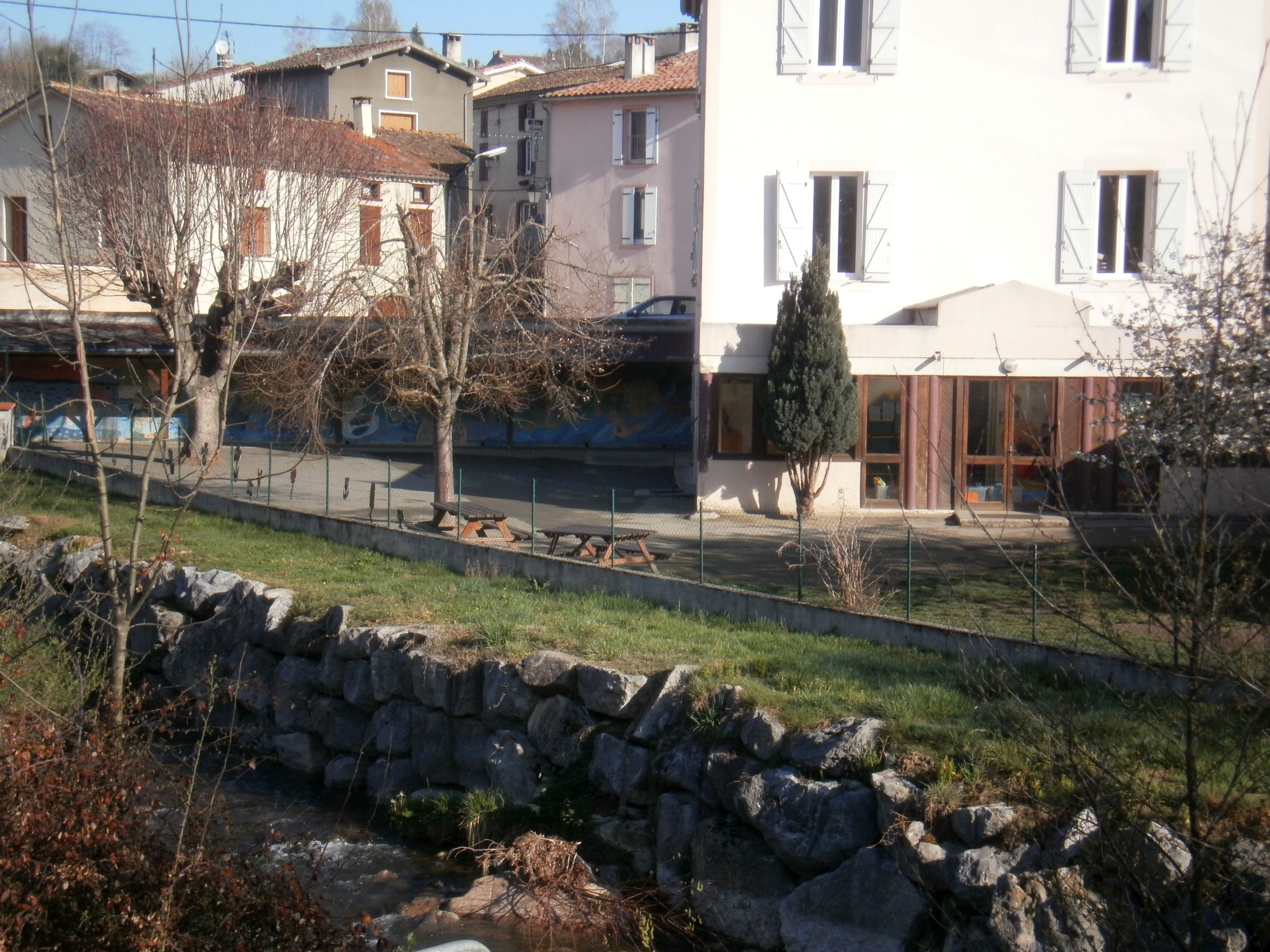
- The school in Saint-Pierre-de-Rivière
- Location of Saint-Pierre-de-Rivière
- Location within France Location within Occitanie
- Coordinates: 42°57′42″N 1°33′37″E
- Country: France
- Region: Occitania
- Department: Ariège
- Arrondissement: Foix
- Canton: Foix
- Intercommunality: CA Pays Foix-Varilhes

Government
  - Mayor (2020–2026): Véronique Rumeau
- Area^{1}: 2.35 km^{2} (0.91 sq mi)
- Elevation: 451 m (1,480 ft)
- Highest elevation: 569 m (1,867 ft)
- Lowest elevation: 436 m (1,430 ft)
- Population (2023): 679
  - Density: 289/km^{2} (748/sq mi)
- Time zone: UTC+01:00 (CET)
  - Summer (DST): UTC+02:00 (CEST)
- INSEE/Postal code: 09273 /09000
- ^{1} French Land Register data, which excludes lakes, ponds, glaciers > 1 km^{2} (0.386 sq mi or 247 acres) and river estuaries.

Saint-Pierre-de-Rivière (French pronunciation: [sɛ̃ pjɛʁ də ʁivjɛʁ]; Languedocien: Sent Pèire) is a commune in the Ariège department in southwestern France.

== Population ==
Historical population
| Year | Pop. | ±% p.a. |
|---|---|---|
| 1968 | 318 | — |
| 1975 | 349 | +1.34% |
| 1982 | 418 | +2.61% |
| 1990 | 463 | +1.29% |
| 1999 | 564 | +2.22% |
| 2007 | 654 | +1.87% |
| 2012 | 641 | −0.40% |
| 2017 | 644 | +0.09% |
| 2023 | 679 | +0.89% |
Source: INSEE

Inhabitants of Saint-Pierre-de-Rivière are called Saint-Pierrois in French.

== See also ==
- Communes of the Ariège department
