= Cos, Ariège =

Commune in Occitanie, France

Cos
- Commune
- Location of Cos
- Location within France Location within Occitanie
- Coordinates: 42°58′43″N 1°34′13″E
- Country: France
- Region: Occitania
- Department: Ariège
- Arrondissement: Foix
- Canton: Foix
- Intercommunality: CA Pays Foix-Varilhes

Government
  - Mayor (2020–2026): Marie-Christine Dubuc
- Area^{1}: 6.4 km^{2} (2.5 sq mi)
- Elevation: 480 m (1,570 ft)
- Highest elevation: 720 m (2,360 ft)
- Lowest elevation: 440 m (1,440 ft)
- Population (2023): 350
  - Density: 55/km^{2} (140/sq mi)
- Time zone: UTC+01:00 (CET)
  - Summer (DST): UTC+02:00 (CEST)
- INSEE/Postal code: 09099 /09000
- ^{1} French Land Register data, which excludes lakes, ponds, glaciers > 1 km^{2} (0.386 sq mi or 247 acres) and river estuaries.

Cos (French pronunciation: [kɔs]; Occitan: Còs) is a commune in the Ariège department in southwestern France.

== Population ==
Historical population
Year	Pop.	±% p.a.
1968	124	—
1975	146	+2.36%
1982	215	+5.68%
1990	236	+1.17%
1999	258	+1.00%
2007	358	+4.18%
2012	405	+2.50%
2017	393	−0.60%
2023	350	−1.91%
Source: INSEE

== Climate ==
On average, Cos experiences 42.5 days per year with a minimum temperature below 0 °C (32.0 °F), 0.1 days per year with a minimum temperature below −10 °C (14.0 °F), 2.5 days per year with a maximum temperature below 0 °C (32.0 °F), and 18.3 days per year with a maximum temperature above 30 °C (86.0 °F). The record high temperature was 37.6 °C (99.7 °F) on 12 August 2022, while the record low temperature was −14.7 °C (5.5 °F) on 9 February 2012.

Climate data for Cos (1991–2020 normals, extremes 2003–present)
Month	Jan	Feb	Mar	Apr	May	Jun	Jul	Aug	Sep	Oct	Nov	Dec	Year
Record high °C (°F)	21.1 (70.0)	24.6 (76.3)	26.3 (79.3)	27.9 (82.2)	31.5 (88.7)	36.8 (98.2)	37.4 (99.3)	37.6 (99.7)	33.5 (92.3)	30.9 (87.6)	26.1 (79.0)	22.3 (72.1)	37.6 (99.7)
Mean daily maximum °C (°F)	9.9 (49.8)	10.4 (50.7)	13.5 (56.3)	16.5 (61.7)	19.4 (66.9)	23.6 (74.5)	26.0 (78.8)	25.9 (78.6)	23.2 (73.8)	19.3 (66.7)	13.6 (56.5)	10.8 (51.4)	17.7 (63.8)
Daily mean °C (°F)	5.4 (41.7)	5.7 (42.3)	8.4 (47.1)	11.3 (52.3)	14.2 (57.6)	18.1 (64.6)	20.3 (68.5)	20.0 (68.0)	17.3 (63.1)	13.7 (56.7)	8.7 (47.7)	6.1 (43.0)	12.4 (54.4)
Mean daily minimum °C (°F)	0.9 (33.6)	0.9 (33.6)	3.3 (37.9)	6.1 (43.0)	9.1 (48.4)	12.7 (54.9)	14.5 (58.1)	14.1 (57.4)	11.4 (52.5)	8.1 (46.6)	3.9 (39.0)	1.4 (34.5)	7.2 (45.0)
Record low °C (°F)	−9.8 (14.4)	−14.7 (5.5)	−12.5 (9.5)	−1.8 (28.8)	0.4 (32.7)	3.0 (37.4)	7.7 (45.9)	6.6 (43.9)	1.6 (34.9)	−2.8 (27.0)	−6.9 (19.6)	−8.0 (17.6)	−14.7 (5.5)
Average precipitation mm (inches)	105.8 (4.17)	82.1 (3.23)	89.3 (3.52)	82.8 (3.26)	105.7 (4.16)	66.9 (2.63)	59.6 (2.35)	62.4 (2.46)	70.9 (2.79)	74.0 (2.91)	110.4 (4.35)	94.1 (3.70)	1,004 (39.53)
Average precipitation days (≥ 1.0 mm)	12.2	10.4	11.9	11.5	11.9	9.4	7.9	7.7	8.0	8.4	11.3	10.7	121.3
Source: Meteociel

== See also ==
- Communes of the Ariège department
