= Vindicius =

Roman slave who exposed king Tarquin's plot to regain throne

Vindicius (fl. 509 BC) was a Roman slave manumitted for his service to the Roman Republic in the first year after it was founded. Ancient sources tell the story as an aetiology for manumissio vindicta, a form of manumission that granted the former slave Roman citizenship. The historicity of Vindicius and the linguistic validity of connecting his name to the etymology of vindicta are dubious, but the story is an example of how Roman legendary history valued patriotism and integrated slaves into civic life.

== The story ==
Vindicius was said to have discovered papers that exposed Tarquin's plot to regain power after the overthrow of the Roman monarchy. Tarquin had been attempting to have his possessions legally restored to him, and the papers indicated that he was doing so in order to be allowed into Rome again with the intention of killing Rome's first consuls, Collatinus and Brutus, and reinstalling himself as king. Vindicius gave these papers to Publius Valerius Publicola on account of the "affable and kindly ways of the man," according to his biographer Plutarch. The meritorious behavior of Vindicius despite his servile status is contrasted to that of the privileged nephews of Collatinus and the sons of Brutus, who conspired in the restoration plot, and Brutus puts his own sons to death.

== Manumission ==
As a reward for his service, Vindicius was released from slavery, granted citizenship, and given the property which was about to be restored to Tarquin. According to tradition, this act established that a slave freed by a citizen master through the same legal procedure would acquire citizenship. The story has explanatory rather than historical value in indicating that the Romans thought that manumissio vindicta predated the Twelve Tables, Rome's early body of laws, by at least fifty years.

== The name ==
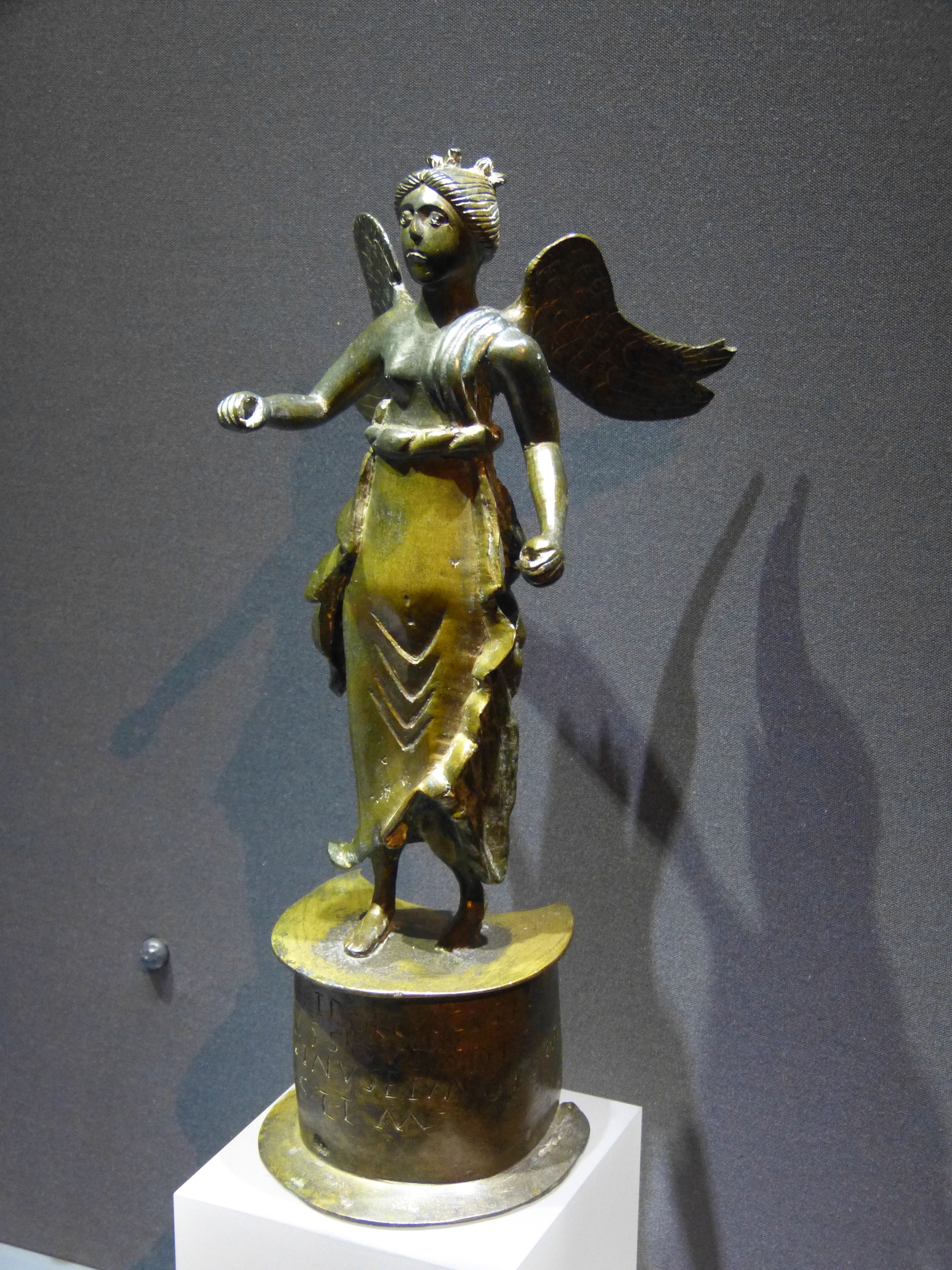
Statuette of a winged Victory dedicated by Vindicius Florentinus and Vindicius Moderatus, found in Austria

The name Vindicius may have been invented for the story, but appears as a nomen in Roman Imperial literature and inscriptions especially in Roman Africa and Gaul into late antiquity. (Note: For example, the deacon named Vindicius in the letters of Sidonius Apollinaris in 5th-century Gaul.)

== See also ==
- Hispala Faecenia, who played a similar role in the suppression of the Bacchanalia in 186 BCE

== Sources ==
- Barja de Quiroga, Pedro López (2018). "The Quinquatrus of June, Marsyas and Libertas In the Late Roman Republic". Classical Quarterly. 68 (1): 143–159. JSTOR 26670591.
- Crawford, M. H. (1971). "Untitled". Classical Review. 21 (2): 255–256. doi:10.1017/S0009840X00279389review of Roman Freedmen during the Late Republic by Susan Treggiari.
- Daube, David (1946). "Two Early Patterns of Manumission". Journal of Roman Studies. 36 (1/2): 57–75. doi:10.2307/298041. JSTOR 298041.
- Feldherr, Andrew (1997). "Livy's Revolution: Civic Identity and the Creation of the Res Publica". In Habinek, Thomas; Schiesaro, Alessandro (eds.). The Roman Cultural Revolution. Cambridge University Press. pp. 136–157.
- Hanaghan, Michael P. (2019). Reading Sidonius' Epistles. Cambridge University Press.
- Watson, Alan (1975). Rome of the XII Tables: Persons and Property. Princeton University Press.
