= Ganac =

Commune in Occitanie, France

- Commune
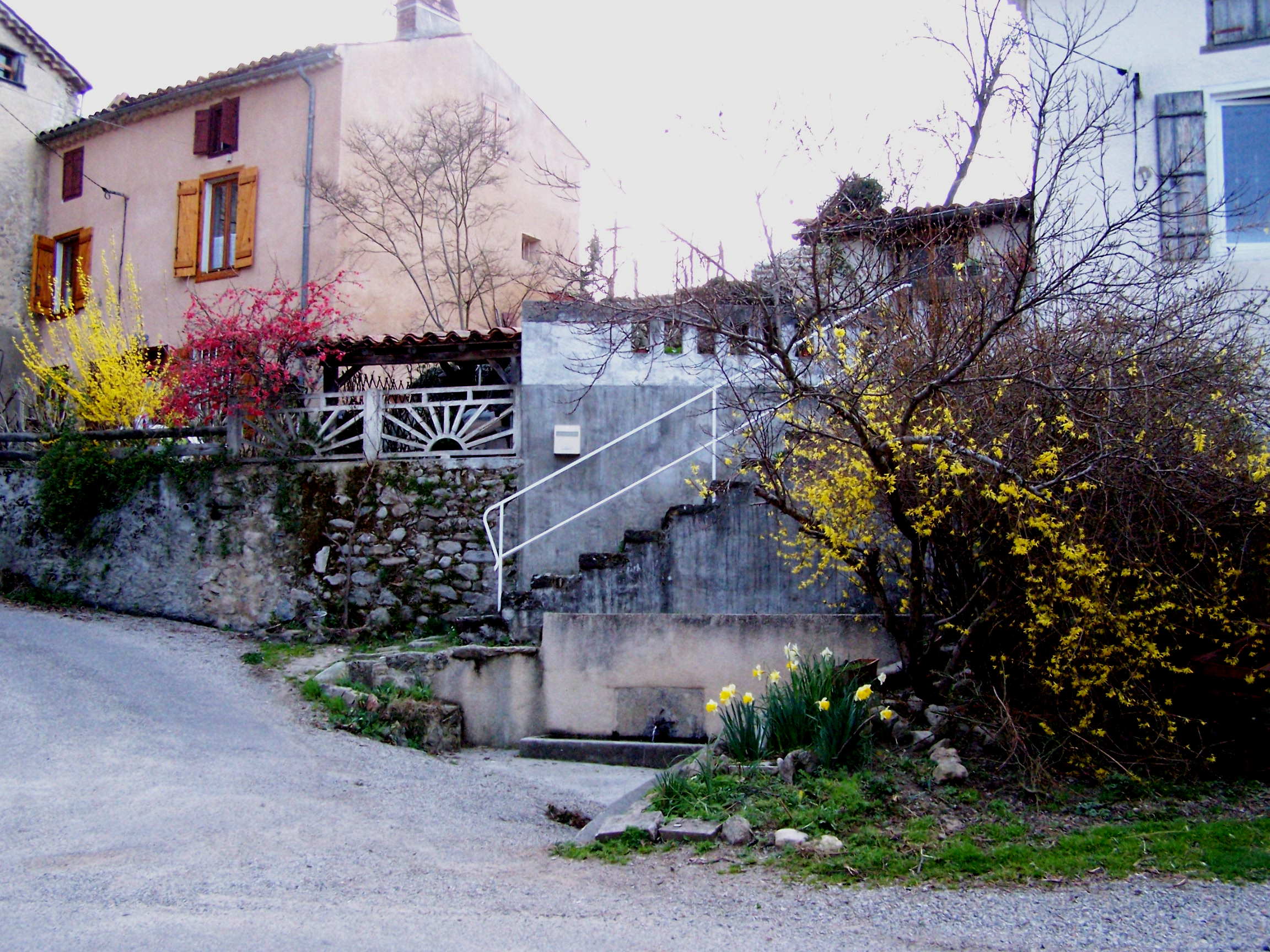
- The fountain at Lacassagne, in Ganac
- Location of Ganac
- Location within France Location within Occitanie
- Coordinates: 42°56′52″N 1°33′49″E
- Country: France
- Region: Occitania
- Department: Ariège
- Arrondissement: Foix
- Canton: Foix
- Intercommunality: CA Pays Foix-Varilhes

Government
  - Mayor (2020–2026): Pierre Ville
- Area^{1}: 20.19 km^{2} (7.80 sq mi)
- Highest elevation: 1,606 m (5,269 ft)
- Lowest elevation: 420 m (1,380 ft)
- Population (2023): 759
  - Density: 37.6/km^{2} (97.4/sq mi)
- Time zone: UTC+01:00 (CET)
  - Summer (DST): UTC+02:00 (CEST)
- INSEE/Postal code: 09130 /09000
- ^{1} French Land Register data, which excludes lakes, ponds, glaciers > 1 km^{2} (0.386 sq mi or 247 acres) and river estuaries.

Ganac (French pronunciation: [ɡanak]) is a commune in the Ariège department in southwestern France.

== Population ==
Historical population
Year	Pop.	±% p.a.
1968	434	—
1975	373	−2.14%
1982	496	+4.16%
1990	579	+1.95%
1999	653	+1.35%
2007	670	+0.32%
2012	693	+0.68%
2017	718	+0.71%
2023	759	+0.93%
Source: INSEE

== See also ==
- Communes of the Ariège department
