= Canton of Foix =

Coordinates: 42.97°N 1.61°E

- Canton
- Situation of the canton of Foix in the department of Ariège
- Country: France
- Region: Occitania
- Department: Ariège
- No. of communes: {{{nbcomm}}}
- Population (2023): 13,947
- INSEE code: 0905

The canton of Foix is an administrative division of the Ariège department, southern France. It was created at the French canton reorganisation which came into effect in March 2015. Its seat is in Foix.

It consists of the following communes:

1. Cos
2. Ferrières-sur-Ariège
3. Foix
4. Ganac
5. Montgailhard
6. Saint-Pierre-de-Rivière
