= Publius Valerius Poplicola =

Roman aristocrat who helped overthrow monarchy (died 503 BC)

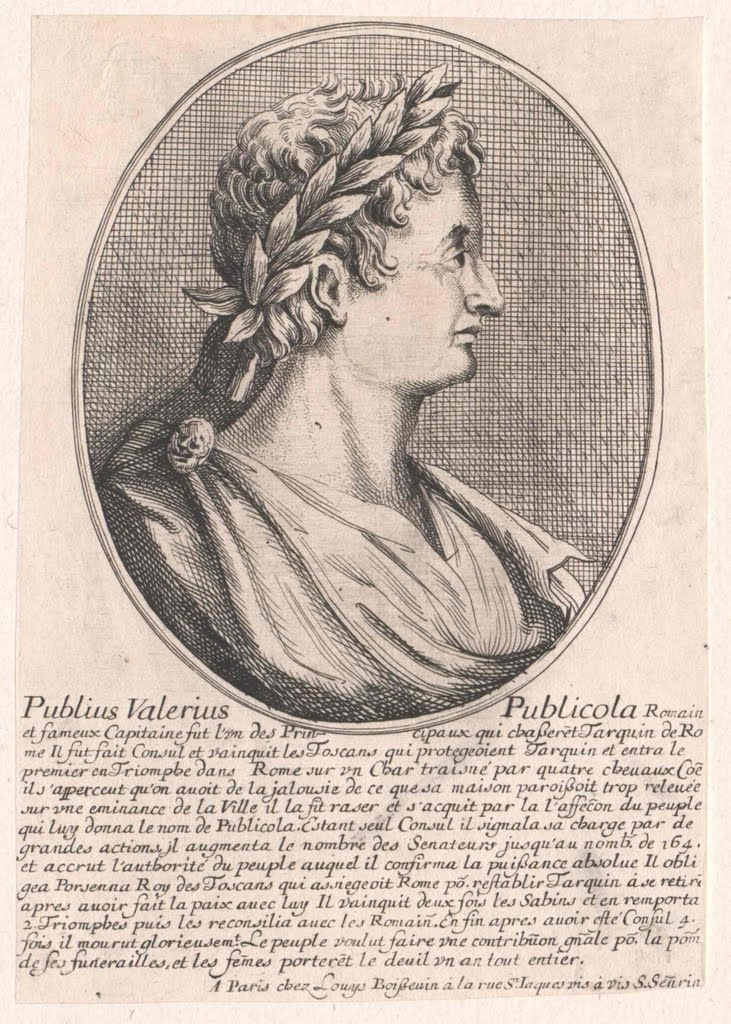
- Died: 503 BC
- Office: Consul (509, 508, 507, 504 BC)
- Children: Publius Valerius Poplicola (consul 475 BC)

Publius Valerius Poplicola or Publicola (died 503 BC) was one of four Roman aristocrats who led the overthrow of the monarchy, and became a Roman consul, the colleague of Lucius Junius Brutus in 509 BC, traditionally considered the first year of the Roman Republic.

== Early life ==
According to Livy and Plutarch, the Valerii were of Sabine origin, but settled in Rome during the reign of Titus Tatius, a contemporary of Romulus, and worked for the peaceful unification of both peoples.

Valerius came from a wealthy family. His father was Volesus Valerius, and his brothers were Marcus Valerius Volusus and Manius Valerius Volusus Maximus. He had a daughter, Valeria, and possibly a son or grandson who was also named Publius Valerius Poplicola who served as consul in 475 BC and 460 BC. Before holding public office, Valerius had spoken in defense of the plebs, the common people of Rome.

== The revolution ==
In 509 BC, Valerius was one of the leaders of the Roman revolution, together with Lucius Junius Brutus, Lucius Tarquinius Collatinus, and Spurius Lucretius Tricipitinus. Winning over public opinion while the king was campaigning away from the city, they deposed and banished Lucius Tarquinius Superbus, the seventh and last King of Rome. In place of the monarchy, they established a republic, together with the office of consul. Brutus and Collatinus were elected the first consuls.

From exile, the Tarquins plotted the assassination of the consuls, together with some disaffected members of the Aquillii and Vitellii, who had benefited from the deposed regime. Valerius was informed of the plot by a slave, Vindicius. He personally investigated the conspiracy, sneaking into the Aquillius estate and finding incriminating evidence, based on which the consuls held a public trial. The conspirators, including two of Brutus' sons, were found guilty and executed. Valerius played a leading role in the trial.

== Election as consul and battle of Silva Arsia ==
After the trial, Brutus demanded that his colleague, Collatinus, resign the consulship and go into exile, as a member of the hated royal family, whom the people could not trust. Collatinus was stunned by this betrayal, as he had been one of the leaders of the rebellion following his wife Lucretia's suicide because of her being raped by the king's son, Sextus Tarquinius. Nevertheless, he resigned, and Valerius was elected to replace him.

Meanwhile, Tarquin, whose family was of Etruscan origin, obtained the support of the Etruscan cities of Tarquinii and Veii. At the head of an Etruscan army, Tarquin fought the consuls Brutus and Valerius at the Battle of Silva Arsia. Valerius commanded the Roman infantry, while Brutus led the cavalry. Arruns Tarquinius, the king's son, died in combat with Brutus, who was also mortally wounded, but the Romans were ultimately victorious.

"They annex strange incidents to this battle, --that in the silence of the next night a loud voice was emitted from the Arsian wood; that it was believed to be the voice of Silvanus: these words were spoken, "that more of the Etrurians by one had fallen in the battle; that the Roman was victorious in the war." Certainly the Romans departed thence as victors, the Etrurians as vanquished."
The History of Rome. Book 2. Chapter 7, by Titus Livius.

Valerius collected the spoils of battle and returned to Rome, where he celebrated a triumph on March 1, 509 BC. His four-horse chariot subsequently became the traditional vehicle for a victorious Roman general. Then, Valerius held a magnificent funeral for Brutus, and gave a memorable speech.

Livy wrote that Valerius fought the Veientes again in the same year, although the reason is not stated.

== First consulship ==
After the death of Brutus, Valerius was the sole surviving consul. Spurius Lucretius was chosen in place of Brutus, but he died after a few days, and was followed by Marcus Horatius Pulvillus. When Valerius began construction of a new house on top of the Velian Hill, which would be conspicuously visible from the Senate house, a rumour began to circulate that he intended to re-establish the monarchy, with himself as king. At once, Valerius stopped building, and demolished the structure in a single night. Addressing an assembly of the people, he caused his lictors to lower their fasces as a mark of humility, and to remove the axes from them within the city. "I have just liberated Rome, bravely, but now I am slandered, like being either an Aquillius or a Vitellian. I am the bitterest enemy of the former kings, so I shouldn't be accused of wanting to be king." In order to allay suspicions, he caused his house to be built at the foot of the hill, rather than its peak. In later times, the Temple of Victory stood in the same place.

For his actions and deference to the people of Rome, Valerius received the surname Poplicola, meaning "one who courts the people". Recent studies on the onomastics of Publicola, however, have served to debunk this myth, in favor of a more plausible interpretation of the cognomen as a compound name meaning "one who takes care of the army". Before the impending elections, Valerius filled up the ranks of the Senate, which had been severely reduced as a result of the revolution and the subsequent war. The consul also promulgated new laws, including the right of appeal (provocatio) from the decisions of a magistrate, and demanding the forfeiture of all the rights of anyone convicted of plotting to restore the monarchy.

== Four consulships ==
Poplicola was elected consul three more times, in 508, 507, and 504 BC. Horatius was his colleague again in 507, while his colleague in 508 and 504 was Titus Lucretius Tricipitinus. He was the first consul ever to be re-elected.

== War with Clusium ==
In 508 BC, Lars Porsena, the king of Clusium, attacked Rome at the behest of Tarquin. According to Plutarch, both Poplicola and his colleague, Lucretius, were severely wounded during the battle. During the siege, Poplicola executed a successful sally, defeating a Clusian raiding party. According to Plutarch, Poplicola negotiated a treaty with Porsena, ending the war. He gave the king hostages, including his daughter Valeria, whom Porsena protected from the Tarquins.

== War with the Sabines ==
In 506, when his brother Marcus was consul, the Sabines attacked Rome. Poplicola participated in two Roman victories, repelling the invasion. The people rewarded Poplicola with a house on the Palatine Hill.

In 505, the Latin League and the Sabines threatened Rome with a large army. Although diplomatic negotiations were halted, Poplicola meddled with the politics of the Sabines, assisting Attius Clausus, who moved to Rome with five hundred followers. Clausus became a Roman citizen under the name of Appius Claudius; he was the founder of the Claudii. When the Sabines attempted to besiege Rome, Poplicola successfully commanded the army, anticipating their movements and thwarting their plans. He was elected consul for the fourth time in 504 BC, and once again defeated the Sabines. He celebrated a triumph in May of that year.

== Death ==
Publius Valerius Poplicola died in 503 BC, shortly after passing the consular office to his successors, Agrippa Menenius Lanatus and Publius Postumius Tubertus. Livy records that at the time of his death, he was considered "by universal consent to be the ablest man in Rome, in the arts both of peace and war". He had little money, and so was buried at the public charge, and was mourned by the Roman matrons as had been done for Brutus before him.

By decree, each citizen contributed a quadrans for the funeral. The remains of Poplicola were buried within the city of Rome, on the Velian Hill. His death was mourned for an entire year. After Poplicola, many noted members of the Valerian gens were buried near the same spot.

== Lapis Satricanus ==
In 1977 an inscription was discovered in the ruins of the ancient town of Satricum. The Lapis Satricanus dates from the late 6th to early 5th centuries BC and bears the name Poplios Valesios, which would be rendered in Classical Latin as Publius Valerius. This does not prove the historicity of the narrative given by later Roman historians, but it does demonstrate that at least one prominent individual did indeed bear the name at the close of the 6th century.

== Legacy ==
In The Federalist Papers, a collection of 85 essays promoting the adoption of the United States Constitution, written by Alexander Hamilton, James Madison, and John Jay in 1787–1788, the three statesmen used the allonym "Publius" in honor of Poplicola's role in establishing the Roman Republic.

Following the Spanish–American War, a piece titled "The Duty of the American People as to the Philippines" was published under the pseudonym "Publicola". The author recommended the development of the Philippines to improve the lives of the Filipino people, as well as to further American trading interests in the Orient.

== See also ==
- Lapis Satricanus

Political offices
Preceded by Lucius Junius Brutus; Lucius Tarquinius Collatinus	Roman consul 509 BC (suffect) with Lucius Junius Brutus, Spurius Lucretius Tricipitinus (suffect), Marcus Horatius Pulvillus (suffect)	Succeeded by himself Titus Lucretius Tricipitinus
Preceded by Marcus Horatius Pulvillus himself	Roman consul II; 508 BC with Titus Lucretius Tricipitinus	Succeeded by himself Marcus Horatius Pulvillus II
Preceded by himself Titus Lucretius Tricipitinus	Roman consul III; 507 BC with Marcus Horatius Pulvillus II	Succeeded by Spurius Larcius; Titus Herminius Aquilinus
Preceded by Marcus Valerius Volusus; Publius Postumius Tubertus	Roman consul IV; 504 BC with Titus Lucretius Tricipitinus II	Succeeded by Agrippa Menenius Lanatus; Publius Postumius Tubertus II
