= Ferrières-sur-Ariège =

Commune in Occitanie, France

- Commune
- Coat of arms
- Location of Ferrières-sur-Ariège
- Location within France Location within Occitanie
- Coordinates: 42°56′36″N 1°37′01″E
- Country: France
- Region: Occitania
- Department: Ariège
- Arrondissement: Foix
- Canton: Foix
- Intercommunality: CA Pays Foix-Varilhes

Government
  - Mayor (2020–2026): Paul Hoyer
- Area^{1}: 3.46 km^{2} (1.34 sq mi)
- Elevation: 400 m (1,300 ft)
- Highest elevation: 1,056 m (3,465 ft)
- Lowest elevation: 390 m (1,280 ft)
- Population (2023): 788
  - Density: 228/km^{2} (590/sq mi)
- Time zone: UTC+01:00 (CET)
  - Summer (DST): UTC+02:00 (CEST)
- INSEE/Postal code: 09121 /09000
- ^{1} French Land Register data, which excludes lakes, ponds, glaciers > 1 km^{2} (0.386 sq mi or 247 acres) and river estuaries.

Ferrières-sur-Ariège (French pronunciation: [fɛʁjɛʁ syʁ aʁjɛʒ], literally Ferrières on Ariège; Occitan: Ferrièras) is a commune in the Ariège department in southwestern France.

== Population ==
Historical population
Year	Pop.	±% p.a.
1968	301	—
1975	482	+6.96%
1982	574	+2.53%
1990	660	+1.76%
1999	705	+0.74%
2007	796	+1.53%
2012	847	+1.25%
2017	771	−1.86%
2023	788	+0.36%
Source: INSEE

== See also ==
- Communes of the Ariège department
