= Raoul de Ferrières =

Trouvère

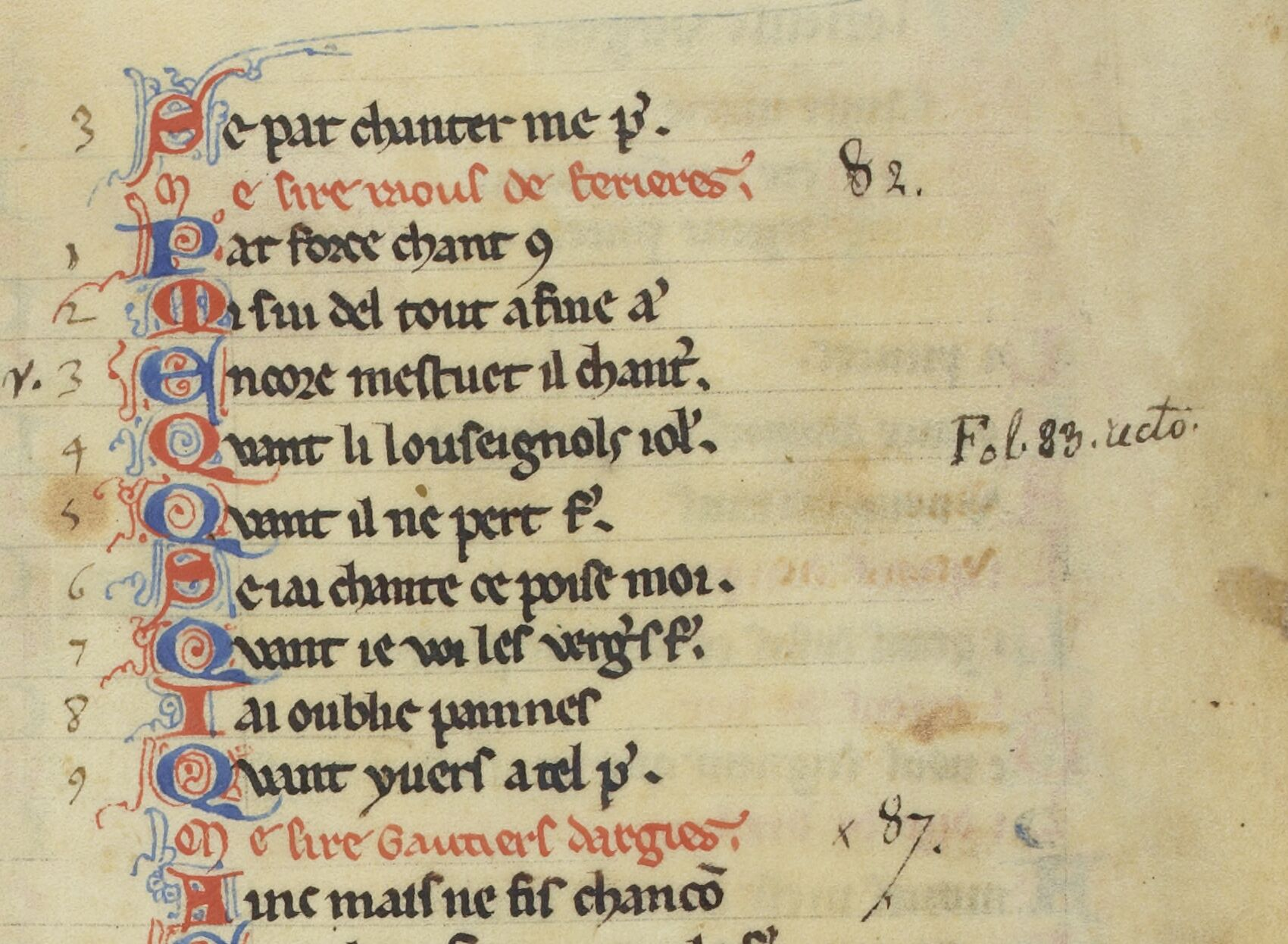
fol.Bv of Bibliothèque nationale de France, fonds français 844.

Raoul de Ferrières (fl. 1200–10), originally de Ferier, was a Norman nobleman and trouvère. He was born in Ferrières in what is today the département of Eure. In 1209, Raoul was mentioned in a donation to the Abbey of Noé.

A total of eleven chansons courtoises have been attributed to him in at least one manuscript, although several are attributed to other people in other copies, making the establishment of his corpus a fraught question.

The most famous of Raoul's songs seems to have been RS1559, Quant li rossignols jolis ("When the pretty nightingales"), which is probably the song Johannes de Grocheio (c.1300) describes as a cantus coronatus ('crowned song', meaning probably that it had received a prize in a competition). This widely copied song is also ascribed to the Chastelain de Couci in several manuscripts as well as being transmitted anonymously in yet others. It was used as a model for the anonymous Marian song L'autrier m'iere rendormis (RS1609). Musically, it starts at the upper octave, flows downwards, and establishes a centre on d.

Most of Raoul's melodies, including Quant li rossignols, were recorded in what is sometimes (anachronistically) called bar form and more correctly as pedes-cum-cauda form, i.e. ABABX, with two AB pedes (collectively the frons) followed by X, the cauda. Two versions of Si sui du tout a fine Amour (possibly later revisions) are not in this form. None of the songs is recorded in mensural notation. Most of the melodies are in what scholars who apply Gregorian modes to secular song would identify as the D modes (authentic and plagal), but three are in the authentic G mode. Poetically, most of his works are also octosyllabic, with the heptasyllabic exceptions of Quant ivers a tel poissance and Quant li rossignols and the mixed octo- and heptasyllabic verses of Quant il ne pert fueille ne flours. After the initial abab rhyme scheme of the pedes, the cauda of all but RS1460 reuses the rhymes of the pedes. The rhyme scheme of the cauda is quite varied: baab (two examples), baaba (four examples), baabab (two examples), baba (two examples), or baabba (one example).

== List of songs ==
Disparities between the list of songs in Grove and on Arlima mask a complex source situation. The taxonomy below lays this out clearly. The securely attributed category is reserved for four songs ascribed to him in sources from two different families (according to Schwan's general taxonomy of the songbooks) that are not subject to conflicting attributions.

Less assured, but still likely in the balance of probability to be by Raoul, are three songs that lack conflicting attributions, but are only attributed to him in one manuscript family. Of the songs in this category, two are found only in TrouvM (Bibliothèque nationale de France fr.844), but appear both in that manuscript's index and in its main body (albeit in a different order and affected by excision of the historiated initial in the author section of the main body). The other song in this category (RS673) is found in sources from two different families, but only attributed two Raoul in the four members of the 'KNPX group', being anonymous in TrouvC (Bern, Burgerbibliothek MS 389).

One of the remaining four songs is almost certainly not by Raoul, being ascribed to Simon d'Authie in TrouvM and TrouvT (Bibliothèque nationale de France, fr.12615), as well as in Trouva (Vatican, Reg. lat. 1490) and only ascribed to Raoul in the four witnesses of the KNPX group. In both TrouvT and TrouvM the song is copied in among the other songs of Simon and appears with them in TrouvM's index, so is very likely to be his.

The three remaining songs also have conflicting attributions but with the attribution to Raoul being the one that occurs in TrouvM's index and in Trouv M. These three songs are the two most widely copied of the eleven that bear any ascription to Raoul, each appearing in three different songbook families. They all have conflicting ascriptions to at least one other trouvère, as well as anonymous transmission in at least one manuscript. These are possibly by Raoul if one credits the index of TrouvM but the weight of the other attributions means that a blanket decision cannot necessarily be made. Details are given in the relevant subheading below; RS numbers are according to the standard catalogue.

== Securely attributed to Raoul ==
- Par force chant conme esbahis (RS1535): no.1 in the Raoul part of the index of TrouvM and copied first in the Raoul section of both TrouvM fol.82r (damaged) and TrouvT fols.124v-125r; transmitted anonymously in Trouva; ascribed to Raoul in copies in all four of the KNPX group, as, for example, here in TrouvK p.186.
- Si sui du tout a fine Amour (RS1956): no.2 in the Raoul part of the index of TrouvM and copied second in the Raoul section of both TrouvM fol.82r-v (damaged) and Trouv T fol.125r-v; also found with attribution in all four members of the KNPX group (TrouvK p.187; TrouvN fol.89; TrouvP fol.74; TrouvX fol.133), as well as anonymously in TrouvC, fol.218r.
- Encore m'estuet il chanter (RS818): no.3 in the Raoul part of the index of TrouvM and copied third in the Raoul section of both TrouvM fol.82v-83r (damaged) and Trouv T fol.125v; also attributed to Raoul in the copy in TrouvC fol.72r.
- Se j'ai chanté, ce poise moi (RS1670): no.6 in the Raoul part of the index of TrouvM and copied ninth in the Raoul section of TrouvM fols.84v-85r as well as being attributed in the copy in TrouvC, fol.224r.

== Likely to be by Raoul ==
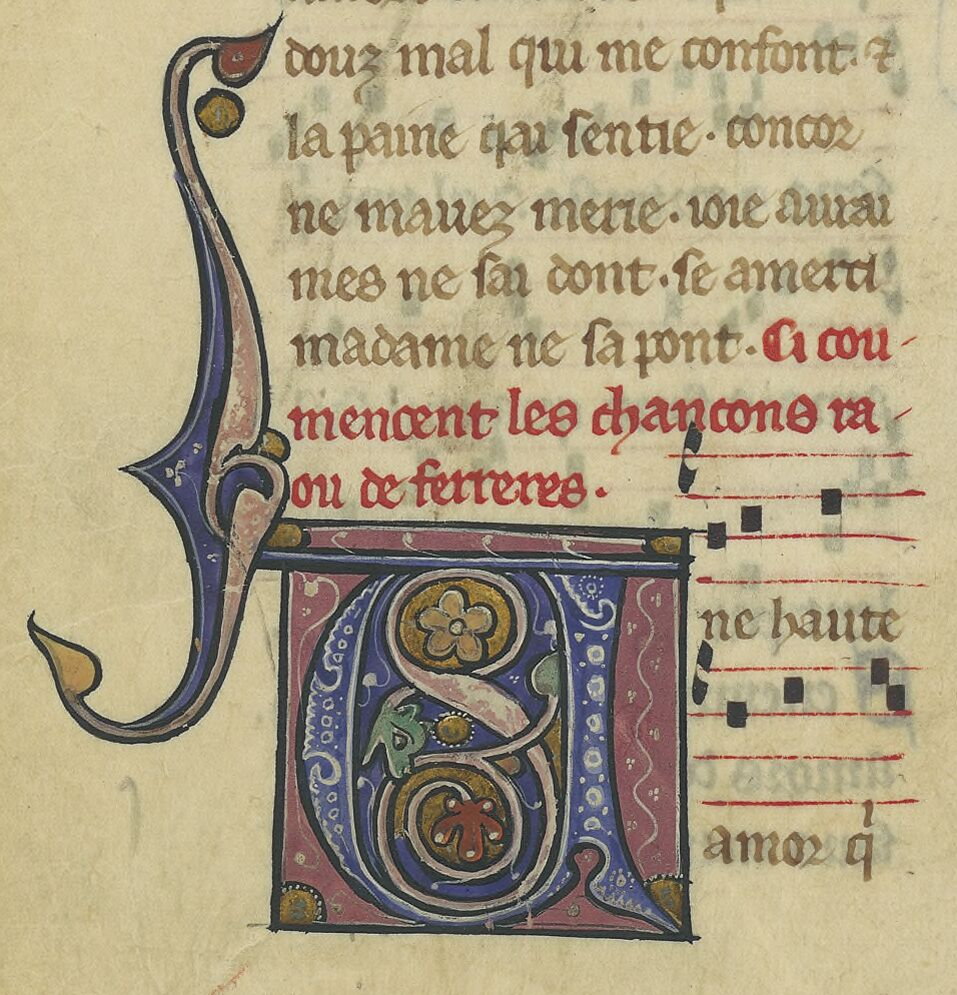
Opening initial of RS673 in TrouvX

- Quant je voi les vergiers florir (RS1412): Listed as no.7 in the Raoul part of the index in TrouvM but appears as an unicum in sixth place in the author section in the body of TrouvM, fols.83v-84r.
- Quant ivers a tel poissance (RS243): Listed as no.9 in the index of TrouvM and appear as an unicum in seventh place in TrouvM fol.84r-v.
- Une haute amour qui esprent (RS673): The sole surviving song ascribed to Raoul that is absent from TrouvM. It appears anonymously and without the initial 'Une' in TrouvC, fol.92. It is ascribed to Raoul in all four members of the KNPX group: TrouvK p.184; TrouvN fol.88; TrouvP fol.73; TrouvX fol.131.

== Possibly by Raoul ==
- Quant li rossignols jolis (RS1559): Listed as no.4 in the index of TrouvM and copied in the Raoul section in the body of TrouvM fol.83r. TrouvT fol.126r also ascribes it to Raoul, as does the copy in TrouvC fol.212v. The KNPX group, by contrast, ascribes it to the Chastelain de Couci. Three further manuscripts transmits it anonymously: TrouvU (Bibliothèque nationale de France, fr.20050), fol.69r; twice in TrouvO (Bibliothèque national de France fr.846) at fol.110v, where it is copied among a group of songs known to be by Gace Brulé and fol.117r; and TrouvV (Bibliothèque national de France fr.24406), fol.77v. The secure attribution of this song is difficult, although the editor of the Chastelain's songs does not consider it securely his.
- Quant il ne pert fueille ne flours (RS2036): Listed as no.5 in the Raoul songs of TrouvM's index and copied there in fifth position on fol.83r-v. As TrouvT's run of songs by Raoul only comprises four in total (the same four in the same order as TrouvM's index and main body), TrouvM's attribution is the only one to Raoul for this song. TrouvC fol.119r transmits it anonymously. As with RS1559, however, the KNPX group ascribes this song to another composer, albeit here with a divergence within this group: TrouvK p.132; TrouvN fol.77v; and TrouvX fol.91v ascribe it to Gautier de Dargies and place it at the end of a run of his songs. TrouvP fol.76v places it third in a run of three songs ascribed to Gontier de Soignies. This attribution to Gontier is unique and the Gontier songs in TrouvP directly follow the four ascribed to Raoul de Ferrières that P shares identically with the other members of the KNPX group. All four of the KNPX group copy this song last in a run of songs by the composer they ascribe it to, whereas TrouvM's index and body place it deeply within a larger set of songs by Raoul. While not conclusive, these oddities may suggest Raoul's authorship of this song has the strongest claim.
- J'ai oublié paine et travaus (RS389): listed as no.8 in the index of TrouvM and copied in eight position (of 9 songs) in Trouv M fol.84v, like RS2036 these two attributions in the index and body of TrouvM are the sole ascription of this widely copied song to Raoul. This time the KNPX group witnesses all ascribe the song to Gace Brulé while TrouvC fol.97v gives it to Andreus de Paris. The song is found anonymously in four further manuscripts: Trouva fol.27v; TrouvL fol.50r; TrouvO fol.67r; and TrouvV fol.30v. Huet's edition of Gace did not include this song. Rosenberg and Danon do include it, but make it clear that it sits right at the limit of their willingness to ascribe songs to Gace.

== Probably not by Raoul ==
- On ne peut pas a deus seigneurs servir (RS1460): this song appears ascribed to Raoul only the KNPX group. These four closely related manuscripts have the same set of four songs in the same order: Une haute amour (RS673), this song, then the first two from the order of the songs in Trouv M and Trouv T, i.e. Par force (RS1535) and Si sui de tout (RS1956). It seems plausible these four were copied from the same exemplary material and are thus not independent witnesses. In TrouvM, TrouvT, and Trouva this song is attributed to Simon d'Authie, including in the index of TrouvM. While these three manuscripts are also in the same family (but distinct from the KNPX group), they are less closely related than the members of the KNPX group, so the attribution to Simon has been generally accepted.

== Modern Editions ==
- Les Chansons de messire Raoul de Ferrieres tres ancien poète normant, [ed. G. S. Trebutien] (Caen: Poisson, 1847).

== Useful Resources ==
- Works list for Raoul de Ferrières on the Archives de littérature du moyen-âge site.
