= Jean-Michel Ferrière =

French footballer (born 1959)

Personal information
- Full name: Jean-Michel Ferrière
- Date of birth: 20 November 1959 (age 66)
- Place of birth: Dompierre-sur-Besbre, France
- Height: 1.78 m (5 ft 10 in)
- Position: Striker

Senior career*
Years	Team	Apps	(Gls)
1978–1980	Gueugnon	25	(15)
1980–1982	Nancy	30	(4)
1982–1983	Béziers	33	(11)
1983–1985	Stade Français	64	(22)
1985–1987	Chamois Niortais	12	(2)
1987–1989	Beauvais	35	(8)
- * Club domestic league appearances and goals

Jean-Michel Ferrière (born 20 November 1959) is a retired professional footballer. He played as a striker.
