= La Ferrière =

La Ferrière or Laferrière may refer to:

== Places ==
=== France ===
- La Ferrière, Côtes-d'Armor, in the Côtes-d'Armor département
- La Ferrière, Indre-et-Loire, in the Indre-et-Loire département
- La Ferrière, Isère, in the Isère département
- La Ferrière, Vendée, in the Vendée département
- La Ferrière-Airoux, in the Vienne département
- La Ferrière-au-Doyen, in the Orne département
- La Ferrière-aux-Étangs, in the Orne département
- La Ferrière-Béchet, in the Orne département
- La Ferrière-Bochard, in the Orne département
- La Ferrière-de-Flée, in the Maine-et-Loire département
- La Ferrière-en-Parthenay, in the Deux-Sèvres département
- La Ferrière-Harang, in the Calvados département
- La Ferrière-sur-Risle, in the Eure département

=== Other places ===
- Citadelle Laferrière, a large mountaintop fortress in Nord, Haiti
- La Ferrière, Switzerland, in the canton of Bern

== See also ==
- Laferrière
- Ferrières (disambiguation)
