= John Reinhard Weguelin =

British painter (1849–1927)

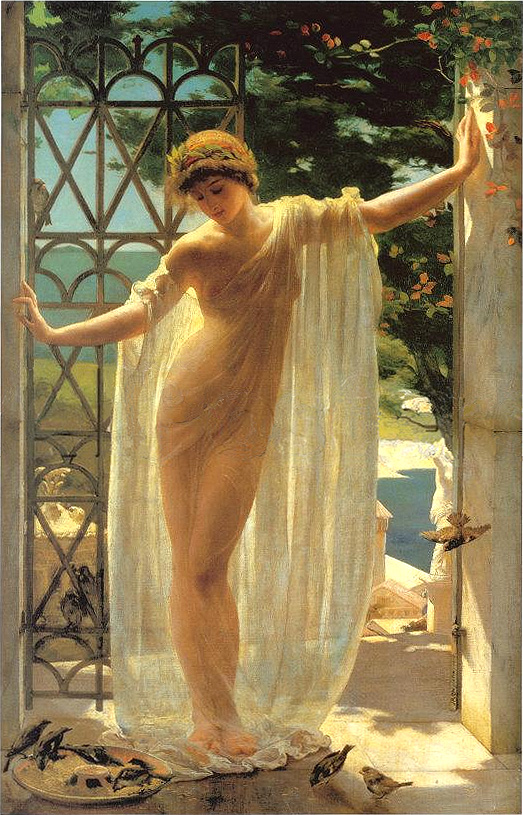
Lesbia (1878)

John Reinhard Weguelin RWS ROI (23 June 1849 – 28 April 1927) was an English painter and illustrator, active from 1877 to after 1910. He specialized in figurative paintings with lush backgrounds, typically landscapes or garden scenes. Weguelin emulated the neo-classical style of Edward Poynter and Lawrence Alma-Tadema, painting subjects inspired by classical antiquity and mythology. He depicted scenes of everyday life in ancient Greece and Rome, as well as mythological subjects, with an emphasis on pastoral scenes. Weguelin also drew on folklore for inspiration, and painted numerous images of nymphs and mermaids.

Although his earliest work was in watercolour, all of Weguelin's important works from 1878 to 1892 were oil paintings. In order to supplement his income, he drew and painted illustrations for several books, most famously Macaulay's Lays of Ancient Rome. His subjects were similar to those of his contemporary, John William Waterhouse, who also specialized in painting the female figure against dramatic backgrounds, but unlike Waterhouse, many of Weguelin's subjects are nude or scantily-clad. Weguelin was particularly noted for his realistic use of light. Beginning in 1893, Weguelin devoted himself almost entirely to watercolour, and became a member of the Royal Watercolour Society. Weguelin's work was exhibited at the Royal Academy and a number of other important London galleries, and was highly regarded during his career. He was forgotten following the first World War, as his style of painting fell out of fashion, and he is best remembered as the painter of Lesbia, depicting the fabled muse of the Roman poet Catullus.

== Life ==
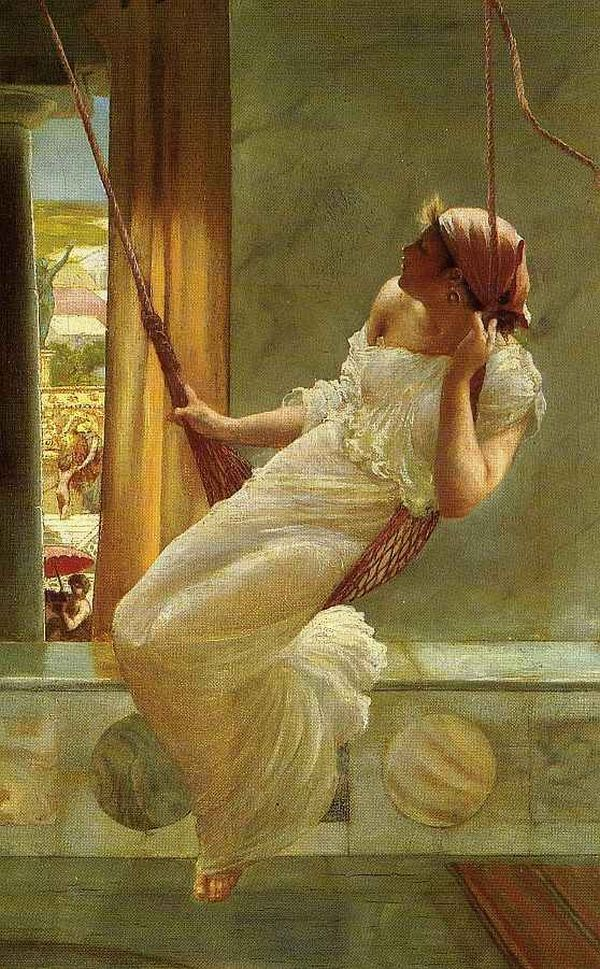
The Swing, 1893.

John Reinhard Weguelin was born 23 June 1849, in the village of South Stoke, near Arundel. His father, William Andrew Weguelin, was Rector of South Stoke, but was forced to relinquish his position about 1856, when he joined the Tractarian Movement, and became a Roman Catholic. When he was still a child, Weguelin's family departed Sussex for Italy, where they lived for several years. Weguelin spent much time at Rome, where he was inspired by art and history. Other than a few drawing lessons in Italy, Weguelin had no formal training in art during his childhood. In 1860, the eleven-year-old Weguelin was sent to Cardinal Newman's Oratory School in Edgbaston. From 1870 to 1873, he worked as an underwriter for Lloyd's of London.

At the age of twenty-three in 1873, Weguelin enrolled in the Slade School of Fine Art, then headed by Edward Poynter. He studied there for five years, under both Poynter and his successor, Alphonse Legros. Weguelin's first exhibited work was a watercolour, The Death of the First-born, at the Dudley Gallery in 1877. On his graduation from "the Slade," he had his first painting exhibited at the Royal Academy. Although later celebrated as a watercolourist, Weguelin would not exhibit in this medium again until the 1890s, and nearly all of his paintings until 1893 were in oil.

Weguelin was heavily influenced by the work of Lawrence Alma-Tadema, but within a few years he developed his own interpretation of classical subjects. Beginning in 1878, he exhibited numerous paintings at various London galleries, including the Royal Academy, the Grosvenor Gallery, and the New Gallery. His work was also featured by the Society of British Artists. His subjects included landscapes, classical and Biblical themes, and pastoral scenes. He also produced illustrations for several books, including the 1881 edition of Macaulay's Lays of Ancient Rome, G. A. Henty's The Cat of Bubastes (1889), a volume of poems by Catullus (1893), Hans Christian Andersen's stories in The Little Mermaid and other Tales (1893), and Thomas Stanley's translation of Anacreon (1894).

The Library described Weguelin as one of the few decorative artists who seldom relied on pen, and habitually expressed themselves in "wash" rather than by line: "Mr. Weguelin has illustrated Anacreon in a manner to earn the appreciation of Greek scholars, and his illustrations to Hans Andersen have had a wider and not less appreciative reception. His drawings have movement and atmosphere."

In 1893, Weguelin took up watercolour for the first time since leaving the Slade. He exhibited The Swing at the Royal Academy, and after a few months he was elected an associate of the Royal Society of Painters in Water Colours. He became a full member in 1897. From this time, Weguelin painted almost exclusively in watercolour, and produced little in oil. He exhibited regularly at a gallery in Pall Mall East.

Weguelin enjoyed canoeing and swimming, and was a member of the Savile Club. In mature life, he settled at Hastings. He died 28 April 1927.

== Artistic style ==
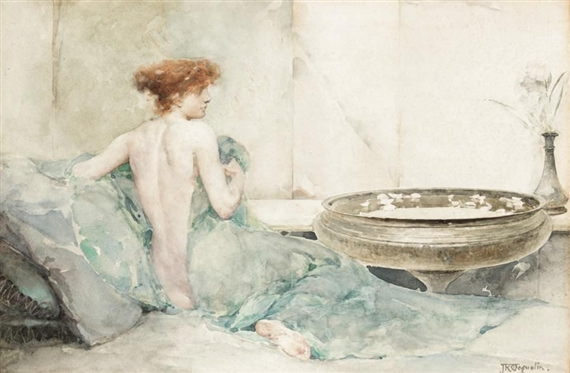
Rodantha.

Weguelin's early works could be considered classicist, reconstructing images of daily life from Greek and Roman times. However, his work reflected a free adaptation of the pagan spirit of classical art, instead of adhering to a strictly historical interpretation. Writing in 1904, art critic Alfred Lys Baldry described Weguelin as "a painter of classic abstractions."

In an 1888 article on exhibitions at the New Gallery, The Art Journal compared the work of three contemporaries, Alma-Tadema, whose work had strongly influenced Weguelin, Charles Napier Kennedy, and Weguelin himself, to that of George Frederic Watts. All four artists treated similar subjects.

Mr. Alma-Tadema's Venus and Mars, Mr. C.N. Kennedy's Fair-haired Slave who made himself a King, and Mr. J.R. Weguelin's Bacchus and the Choir of Nymphs are figure subjects of more realistic intention than the preceding [referring to Mr. Watts' ''Angel of Death'']. Mr. Tadema's colour is the most mellow, and Mr. Weguelin's the hardest and coldest. All three are seriously studied, and give a more or less true notion of the figure in its natural relation to the environment.

Weguelin's later work was described by Baldry in The Practice of Water-Colour Painting:

It is especially as a painter of the nude figure in water-colour that Mr. J.R. Weguelin has made himself famous. He has taken up a class of subject that comparatively few artists attempt, and he has handled it in a long series of very attractive paintings with a charm and distinction that can be sincerely admired. He has a very pleasing fancy and a delightful sense of style; and his graceful draughtsmanship, his exquisite feeling for delicate harmonies of colour, and his brilliantly direct and expressive brushwork make his productions more than ordinarily important as examples of the judicious application of the water-colour medium.

Baldry goes on to discuss Weguelin's principles and techniques.

The Eleventh Edition of the Encyclopædia Britannica mentions Weguelin as, "one of the most facile and expressive painters of fantastic figure subjects."

British Water-Colour Art lists the colours used by members and associates of the Royal Society of Painters in Water Colours. Weguelin's palette included "vermilion, light red, rose madder, purple madder, brown madder, yellow ochre, cadmium 1 and 2, oxide of chromium, oxide of chromium (transparent), black and Chinese white, Vandyke brown, raw umber, burnt umber."

The Practice of Water-Colour Painting describes his palette as "cendre blue, French blue, oxide of chromium (opaque and transparent), Hooker's green, No. 1, yellow ochre, aureolin, cadmium orange, raw sienna, burnt sienna, purple madder, rose madder, light red, brown madder, Vandyke brown, raw umber, and flake white; and occasionally vermilion, burnt umber, and lampblack."

== Selected works ==
The Death of the First-born (1877, watercolour) was Weguelin's debut at the Dudley Gallery, and his last important watercolour until 1893. The subject was one that Alma-Tadema had treated in both 1859 and 1872. Its title refers to the last of the ten Plagues of Egypt appearing in the Book of Exodus, in which the first-born children of all Egypt were struck down, convincing the Egyptians to release the Hebrews from bondage.

The Death of the Firstborn, by Mr. Weguelin, shows a young man stretched out stark for the funeral-rites, and his mother (perhaps, rather, his wife) crouched on the ground with her face hidden between her knees; a sufficiently well-conceived treatment, fairly executed, but not to be called intense.

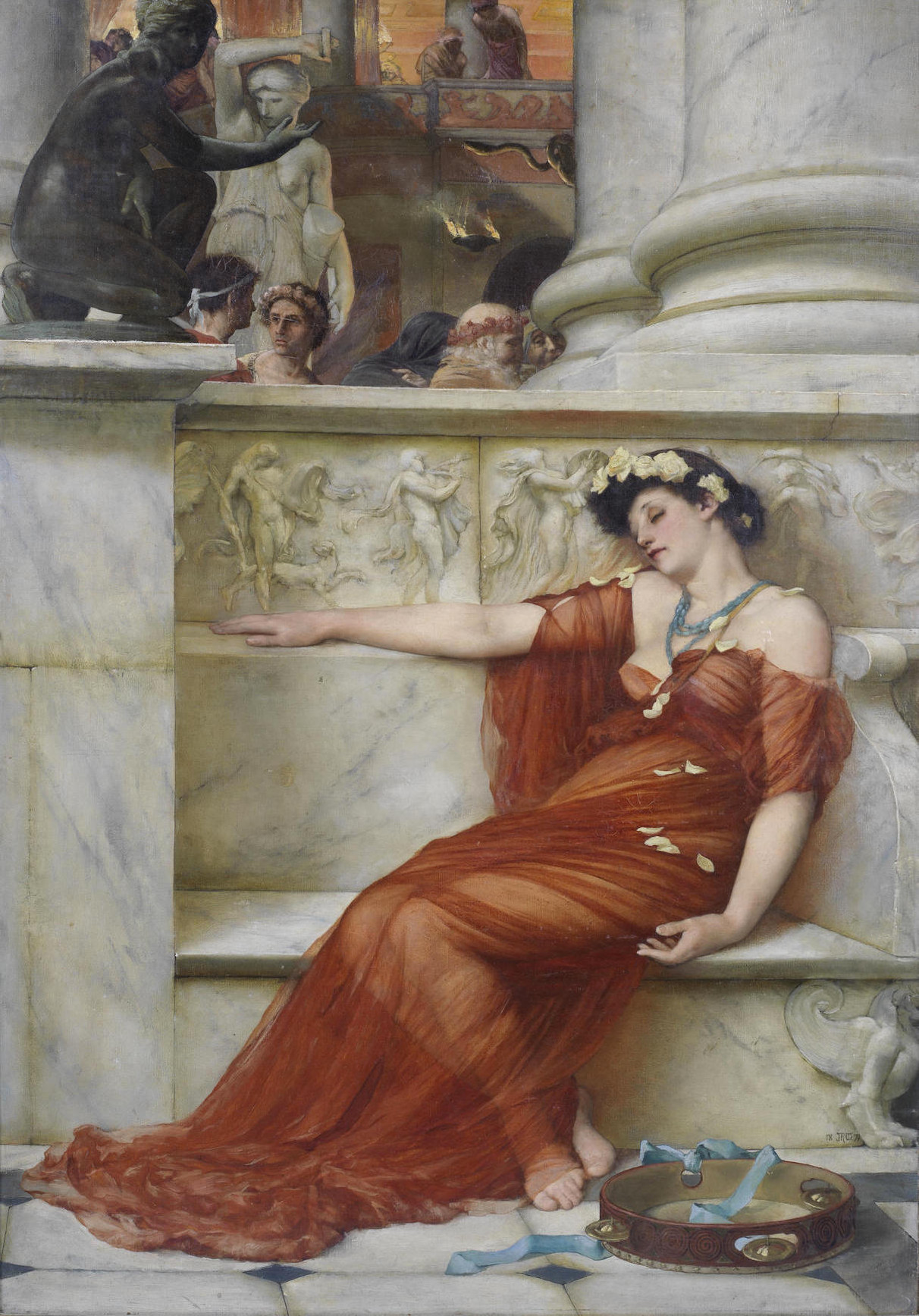
The Tired Dancer (1879).

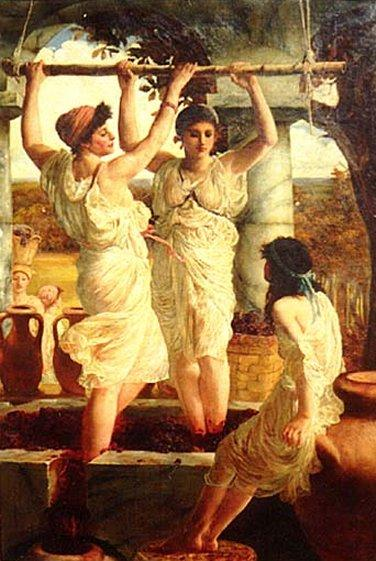
Pressing Grapes (1880).

The daughters of the Greek king Danaüs pour jugs of water into a bottomless jar that they are condemned to fill, in The Labor of the Danaïdes (1878). This painting was exhibited at the Royal Academy.

Weguelin's most famous painting is probably Lesbia (1878), inspired by the woman who inspired many of the Roman poet Catullus' works. Catullus used the pseudonym "Lesbia" to refer to an aristocratic lover whom he did not wish to scandalize, although their relationship was tumultuous, and Catullus writes bitterly of its ending. She is widely supposed to have been Clodia, around whom swirled rumors and scandals involving some of the most prominent men at Rome, although no contemporary source makes that identification, and this element of mystery adds to the appeal of both the poems and Weguelin's painting.

In the painting, Lesbia is depicted as a young woman, standing contrapposto and framed in the gateway of a garden. She is clad only in a diaphanous gown through which sunlight is visible, and in her hair is a garland. Lesbia is feeding the birds, which fly and perch about her and gather at her feet. The birds depicted are house sparrows. Behind Lesbia are flowers, trees, and a view of the sea.

The Tired Dancer, also known as Revelry (1879), was exhibited at the Grosvenor Gallery. It was reviewed in The Dublin University Magazine:

J.R. Weguelin's "Tired Dancer" is very clear and rich. The girl has flung herself upon a marble seat beneath a marble pillar; her loose dress of dark red gause forms a brilliant patch against the marble, and yet it does not hide the limbs beneath. Her dark hair is crowned with clustering yellow flowers, the face is utterly asleep, and the right arm flung out straight upon the marble slab behind her well conveys the idea of complete weariness. The execution of the marble is a kind of reminiscence of Alma Tadema's work.

A Portrait (1880) was exhibited at the Royal Academy.

In Pressing Grapes (1880), two young women, their skirts gathered to their knees, stand in a stone tub, pressing grapes, as the juice pours into a bucket through a notch in the side of the tub. The two women stand on either side of a pole suspended from above, which they grasp with their hands to keep their balance. Behind them are arches, through which a richly-forested landscape can be seen below and stretching into the distance. Stone jars and baskets of grapes line the wall. A young girl with a ribbon in her hair leans against a large vessel, her feet on a stool as she watches the women work. The painting was discovered at a home in Portland, Maine in 1997, and subsequently determined to be the work of Weguelin. This may be the same painting as The Vintage.

The Vintage (1880, oil on canvas, 45 1/2 x 30") was exhibited at the Grosvenor Gallery with an excerpt from Macaulay's poem, Horatius: And in the vats of Luna/This year the must shall foam/Round the white feet of laughing girls/Whose sires have marched to Rome. In its review, The Times described the painting as, "a rare example of pictorial use made of a good subject which is contemporary as well as antique." A simpler version appears as one of the illustrations to the 1881 edition of the Macaulay poems.

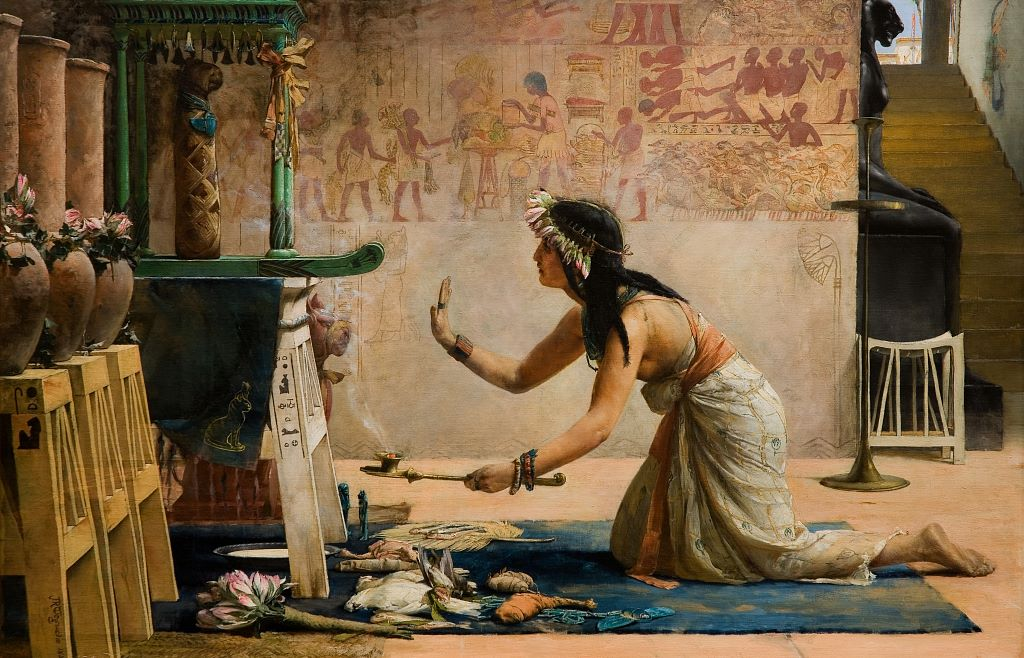
The Obsequies of an Egyptian Cat (1886).

The Fishers (1881) was exhibited at the Royal Academy.

A Roman Acrobat (1881) was exhibited at the Grosvenor Gallery. It was critiqued in The Gentleman's Magazine, where it was compared with William Britten's The Flight of Helen, with which it was exhibited:

Allegory has no place in Mr. Weguelin's canvas; no Venus need smile approval of the feat that is there recorded. A Roman Acrobat—a strapping girl making her perilous way along the tight-rope, and watched by wondering eyes as the arms balance each other and the bare feet press and squeeze round the narrow cord—is a subject that most of the few painters fitted to deal with it at all would have been tempted to make too carefully antiquarian. A painful realisation of the furniture of antiquity—a small truth to a small matter—would have left little room for the greater truths of character and the higher interests of beauty and action. From this permanent error—which yet would have ensured that passing popularity which waits on the adroit display of mere learning and craftsmanship—Mr. Weguelin is freed. One's first thought is not of the artist, of his fund of antiquarian knowledge and his laborious battle with technical difficulty. One takes, instead, a frank and simple pleasure in the picture. It is of excellent draughtsmanship and expressive action—at once imaginative and real. Mr. Weguelin is hardly shown by it to be a skilled colourist, but he is a vivid painter of open-air light, in which it may be that colours strike one as less subtle. Mr. Weguelin's work depends less, however, upon any single highly developed gift of technical skill than upon a union of many gifts which are considerable already, and will improve by and by.

Weguelin's illustrations for Macaulay's Lays of Ancient Rome appeared in the 1881 edition, the cover of which employed Weguelin's depiction of Horatius defending the Sublician bridge against the army of Lars Porsena.

In Bacchus Triumphant (1882, oil on canvas, 18 x 12 1/4"), the god is depicted as a child, being carried on a litter through a jubilant crowd. He is seated on a wild boar, and in his hand he clutches a thyrsus, which he raises triumphantly. In the background is an ancient tree trunk, and the pedestal of some monumental statuary. Poplars and the sea are visible in the distance.

The Feast of Flora (1882) was exhibited at the Royal Academy:

"The Feast of Flora" (No. 766), by J. R. Weguelin, is a bright picture, well drawn, with great attention paid to the details, and some humour. The chief figure is a young woman with a basketful of fresh flowers coming down a marble staircase, holding a bunch of narcissus blossoms up to the nose of a great black Egyptian idol. In the courtyard to the left, there is a bronse figure, and about the staircase and in the distance are gay crowds celebrating the joyous festival.

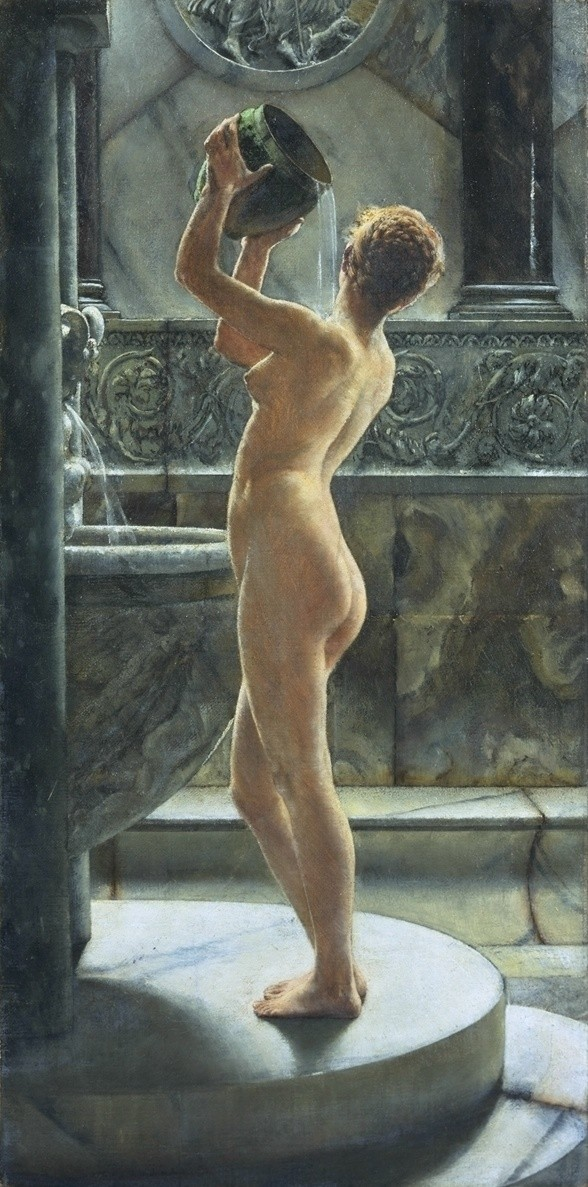
The Bath (1884).

Habet! (1882) features a bather stooping down to assist a tortoise, whom she has inadvertently knocked over. This painting was exhibited at the Grosvenor Gallery.

In The Maidens' Race, (1883) six virgins wearing chitons await the start of a footrace before an arena filled with cheering spectators. A seventh is preparing to give the signal for the race to begin. In a catalogue of works exhibited at the Royal Academy, a note reads, "During the games celebrated in honour of Here, it was the custom of the young girls of Elis to run in the Olympic stadium, which was shortened for them by one-sixth." This painting was admired by Lewis Carroll, who mentioned it in his diary.

The Bath (1884, oil on canvas, 20 x 10") features a nude woman standing before a fountain, from which she has drawn water in an urn. The bather is pouring water from the urn over her left shoulder, while her face is turned away from the viewer.

With Herodias and her Daughter (1884), Weguelin depicts a scene from the Gospels of Matthew and Mark. Herodias, whose marriage to Herod Antipas was called illegal by John the Baptist, encourages her beautiful daughter Salome to dance for her stepfather, and demand an oath of him. Once he has agreed, Salome requires her stepfather to bring her the head of John, much to Herod's dismay. This painting was exhibited at the Royal Academy.

In the painting, Weguelin depicts Herodias persuading her reluctant daughter to participate in her plan for revenge. Salome is clad in veils, preparing to dance seductively before her stepfather and his guests at a banquet. The two stand behind the corner of a wall, and a large statue of a lion carved in an oriental style. There is an elaborate marble floor, and guests are visible at the edge of the painting, while Herod's pavilion, in the style of a Greek temple, is in the background.

An Egyptian Difficulty in the time of Augustus (1885, 35 x 23"), otherwise known as A Young Girl with Flamingoes, and probably the same as Dance of the Flamingos (1885, oil on canvas, 92 x 61.2 cm) was exhibited in the Grosvenor Gallery. The catalogue describes the painting as, "a girl with flamingoes; marble arch over bronze door. A characteristic picture by this artist." In one hand, the girl holds a hoop wound with ivy or a similar vine, and in the other a stalk of grass, which she waves toward one of a group of tame flamingos, apparently trying to coax it through the hoop.

In The Swing Feast (1885, oil on canvas, 51 x 33"), two young women, one standing, one seated, enjoy a pair of swings suspended from trees before a temple, with other celebrants in the background. The Royal Academy catalogue explains, "In expiation of the death of Erigone, who hung herself, and in imitation of her, the maids of Athens on this day swung themselves from trees, while they sang hymns in her honour."

Reflection (1885, oil on canvas, 8 x 10") depicts a nude lying on cushions before a pool of water. She plays with a long garland of roses.

In The Obsequies of an Egyptian Cat (1886, 32 x 49"), a priestess kneels before an altar upon which is placed the mummy of a cat. She is burning incense, and has presented offerings of flowers and food to the cat's spirit, together with a plate of milk. On the wall behind the priestess is an Egyptian fresco, and a statue of the goddess Sekhmet or Bastet enthroned guards the entrance to the temple. Stairs lead up to the doorway, through which a view of the sky and other buildings are visible.

A Summer Afternoon (1886, 8 x 10") is a picture of a young woman napping on a pile of cushions on a wide bench, attached to a high wall. It was exhibited at the Grosvenor Gallery.

The Fair Girl (1886) was also exhibited at the Grosvenor Gallery. Grosvenor Notes describes the subject: "dark hair, standing against a wall."

The Captive Wood Nymph (1887) received a diploma of the third order of merit amongst oil and watercolour paintings from the Adelaide Jubilee International Exhibition.

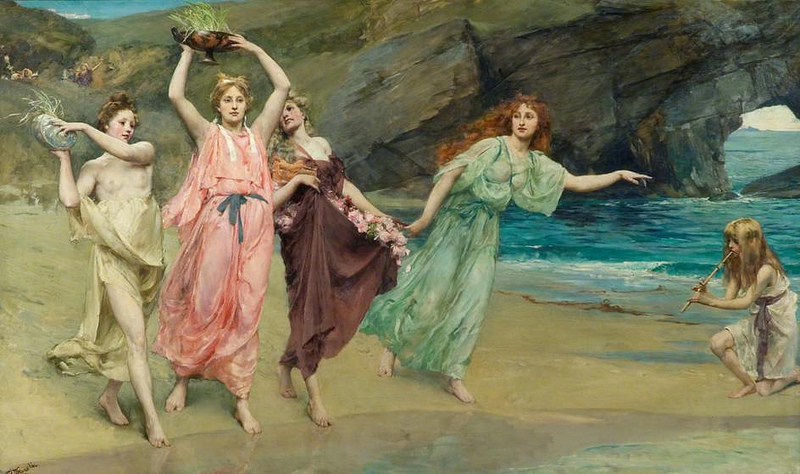
The Gardens of Adonis (1888).

The Toilet of Faunus, or Adoring the Herm (1887, 20 x 22") was exhibited at the Royal Academy, where it was described as, "girl placing wreaths of purple flowers on Faun's head."

The Gardens of Adonis (1888, oil on canvas, 93 x 135 cm) was exhibited at the New Gallery, where it was described: "Light flowing robes of pink purple, green and pale lemon colour; one maiden carries rose wreaths for offerings." The catalogue explains,

Before the feast of Adonis it was the custom of the Greeks to sow in shallow vessels the seeds of lettuce, endive, barley, &c. These grew up quickly, and having no roots soon withered away, and in consequence were considered as typifying the life and early death of Adonis. They were called Gardens of Adonis, and after being carried in procession were, together with a statuette of the god, committed to the sea on the last day of the ceremonies. This observance is described by Theocritus, Idyll XVI.

This painting is part of the collection of the Northampton Central Museum & Art Gallery.

Bacchus and the Choir of Nymphs (1888, oil on canvas, 49 x 108 1/2") was described as "one of the most important compositions in the New Gallery:"

Bacchus with red garment lying on a leopard skin holds a thyrsus. The nymphs have pale draperies of pink, yellow and white; one has ivy in her hair, and another on the left some violet flowers; the sea lies blue below them, flecked with purple shadows; the rocks are grey; the picture is light in color throughout, and delicately harmonised.

The painting was exhibited with the anonymous translation, perhaps that of the artist, of the first lines of Horace's Bacchum in remotis carmina rupibus vidi docentem (Odes 2.19): "I saw within remotest rocks/ (Believe that read in after time)/Bacchus who taught and nymphs in flocks/Who learnt the lesson of his rhyme."

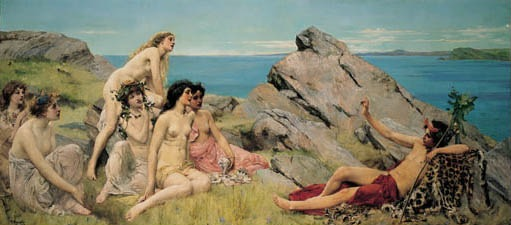
Bacchus and the Choir of Nymphs (1888).

A Bacchante (oil on canvas, 11 1/2 x 7 1/2") features a young worshipper of Bacchus, leaning against a pillar. She wears a leopard skin, and in her hair is an ivy garland.

The Study of Conchology (1888, 20 x 10") was exhibited at the Grosvenor Gallery. It features a young woman, nude, gathering seashells. Grosvenor Notes describes the background: "blue sea, with purple rocks showing through clear water."

The Yellow Sands (1888, oil on canvas, 10 x 20") is described as "a small nude study; back view." It features a woman sitting on the beach on a clear day, when the sea is calm. This painting was exhibited at the New Gallery.

In 1889, Weguelin painted three "Decorative Panels for a door," described in Grosvenor Notes as "(1) girl standing on crab; (2) seated on back of fish; and (3) flying through the air, followed by fishes. Small nude studies."

Psyche (1890, oil on canvas, 24 x 20") was exhibited at the New Gallery, whose catalogue described it: "small head of a girl, with opal-tinted butterfly wings." She is holding the box of Pandora.

"Spring-time" (1890, oil on canvas, 68 1/4 x 32") was also exhibited at the New Gallery. The catalogue describes it: "foremost figure in almost transparent white robe, with dark violet blue sash; behind her a figure in reddish purple. All the foreground is in shadow. A gleam of sunlight catches the apple-blossom and strikes across the grass beyond." The painting is labeled, O primavera, gioventù del anno/O gioventù, primavera della vita (O spring, youth of the year/O youth, the springtime of life).

A Roman man bearing a sprig of laurel pours water from a pitcher into a pool of water in O Babbling Spring, an illustration for Horace, Book iii, Ode xiii. The spring rises at the foot of large boulders, and a young goat is tied to a statue above some small urns. An engraving of this picture was used as the frontispiece for the July, 1890 edition of Scribner's Magazine.

To Faunus is a drawing depicting a maiden and her companion behind a large rock on a hillside, as Faunus plays upon his flute nearby. The maiden wears a garland in her hair, and carries her drapery as she stands, listening. Her naked companion is rising from the ground. This illustration served as the frontispiece for the July, 1891 edition of Scribner's Magazine.

Old Love Renewed (1891) is an illustration for one of the poems of Horace, Book iii. Ode ix. It was exhibited at the New Gallery.

Behind the dark-haired maiden, who stands looking back at her former lover, is the pale-blue sky and the warmer tinted sea, and in full contrast to them a branch of crimson rhododendron which grows out from behind the marble wall. The man who sits in the shadow of a cypress is clad in a pale purple cloak. In the middle distance the many-coloured town is seen in full sunlight.

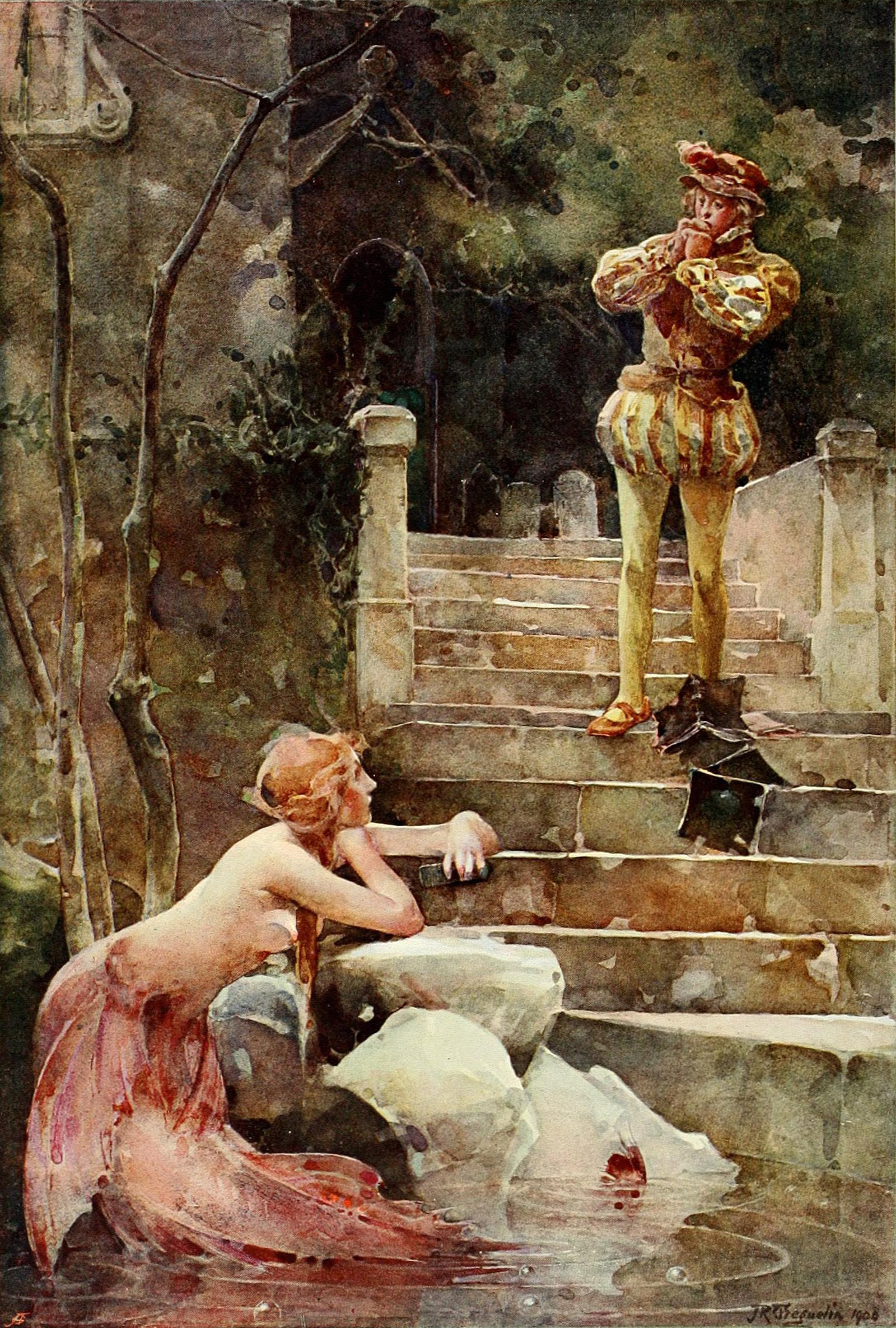
The Mermaid of Zennor (1900).

A nude girl whispers to a silent statue of a sphinx in A Whispered Question (1892), which was exhibited at the Royal Academy. This painting was one of seven used as illustrations in S.G. Owen's edition of Catullus.

Mr. Weguelin's plates enhance greatly the value of the book. These consist of a charming frontispiece and six other illustrations, all equally graceful in design and execution. The first and most graceful of these is to the second ode, and presents Lesbia and her sparrow. The last illustration is to l. 35 of the 'Pervigilium Veneris.' Mr. Weguelin's designs have the grace and beauty of last century workmanship.

Heard Melodies are Sweet; but Those Unheard are Sweeter was exhibited at the New Gallery in 1892.

The Swing (1893) marked Weguelin's return to watercolour. This painting was exhibited at the Royal Academy.

The same year, Weguelin produced sixty-five illustrations for The Little Mermaid and Other Stories, a collection of fairy tales by Hans Christian Andersen. A review in The Sketch reported, "as for Mr. J.R. Weguelin's illustrations it would scarcely be possible to over-praise them; the pencil can do no more for Andersen than Mr. Weguelin has done for him here."

In 1894, Weguelin illustrated Thomas Stanley's translation of Anacreon. His watercolor paintings were turned into photogravures for the book. Ten paintings from this collection were exhibited at the New Gallery, including a frontispiece, Love's Night Walk, Roses, The Wish, The Invitation, The Picture, Love Imprisoned, The Spring, The Bee, and On a Basin wherein Venus was Engraved.

The frontispiece depicts two young women on the ground, one seated and one reclining, before a statue of Anacreon, who holds a flute. Trees and bushes occupy the background, with the words, ΑΝΑΚΡΕΟΝΤΟΣ ΜΕΛΗ.

In Love's Night Walk, a young man lies on a bed of cushions, asleep but with a restless pose and expression. Behind him is a wall, open to the outside, and seated on the wall is Cupid, aiming an arrow of love at the sleeper.

Two young women, one fair and one dark, both wearing long, flowing dresses, dance beneath a garland in Roses.

The Wish depicts a woman untying her sandal before stepping into a pool of water to bathe. Lilies rest on the calm, reflecting surface, and grasses and shrubs occupy the background.

A youth on the ground implores a maiden's affections in The Invitation. The young man wears a garland as he stretches toward his companion. She, nude, looks away, bashfully. Behind them is a wall of rock.

The Picture depicts a woman in contemplation, as she reclines against some pillows on a bed. Behind her is a relief, depicting a festival with musicians.

Love Imprisoned features a nude woman, seated on the ground, who has bound Cupid between two trees with a garland of flowers. The annoyed deity looks over his shoulder at his captor, whose back is to the viewer.

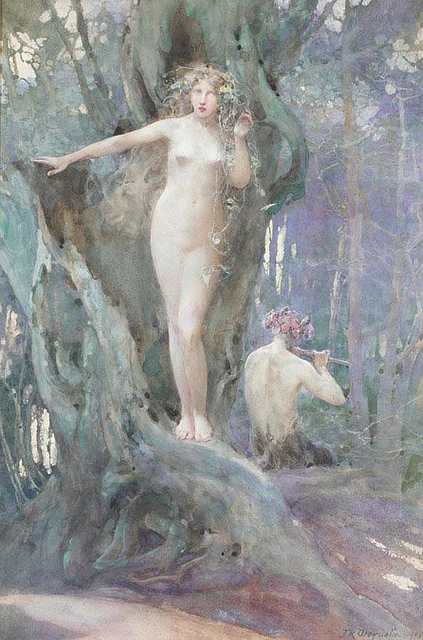
The Magic of Pan's Flute (1905).

In The Spring, three nude maidens gather flowers to string into garlands. One sits on the ground, holding the garland on which she has been working, as a second holds a string of blossoms above her head, and a third picks flowers to add.

The infant Cupid, distressed after being stung by a bee, seeks his mother's comfort in The Bee. Venus stands amidst small trees by a shallow pool, gazing at her crying son, who sits on the a cloth on the ground, looking at his wound. She wonders at the pain her son's arrows will inflict on lovers, compared with the hurt caused by that "winged serpent" called a bee.

Venus swims amidst breaking waves in On a Basin wherein Venus was Engraved. Here the title is allegorical, the basin being the sea itself, and Venus' birth being described as engraving. The fins of a dolphin (depicted in the heraldic manner, rather than realistically) emerge from the foam nearby, and a rocky headland can be seen in the background.

Two young women in flowing gowns gather flowers in a spring garden and fling them at one another in mock battle, in A Battle of Flowers (1894, watercolour, 20 x 28 1/2"). This picture was exhibited by the Royal Watercolour Society, together with Venetian Gold, and may be the same picture known as Rose Petals.

The watercolour Venetian Gold, exhibited at the Royal Watercolour Society in 1894, depicts "sixteenth-century ladies in their schiavonetti, having their hair combed in the sun on the flat roofs of a house." The Saturday Review remarked that "Mr. Weguelin affects a new style of technique this year, very liquid, and light in hue. His Venetian Gold is one of the most interesting drawings he has exhibited."

Rustic Phidylé was also exhibited at the Royal Watercolour Society at its 1894 exhibition. The painting, depicting a young woman before a rustic altar, was pictured and described in The Studio as "draped and decorous, yet impulsive and fresh [...] seen in the gesture of the ancients as they addressed themselves to the celestial gods."

Pelagia, another watercolour displayed at the same exhibition, is described as a "nude figure...large and firm of contour, gleaming against southern waters".

Rodantha (watercolour, 13 3/4 x 20 3/4") depicts a young woman with red hair, draped in blue and reclining against a pile of cushions.

Cupid Bound by the Nymphs (1896, oil on canvas) depicts three nymphs frolicking in a wood with the infant Cupid, whom they have bound with garlands. This painting was exhibited at the Royal Academy, and the Walker Gallery in Liverpool.

The Piper and the Nymphs (1897) features a piper playing at the foot of a gnarled tree by the banks of a stream, as nymphs listen from their seats on roots on the other side. A young nymph stands on a rock overlooking the stream, rapt in the music. She is nude, and flowers fill her hair. This painting was exhibited at the Royal Academy.

In 1898, Weguelin illustrated a volume of works by Lew Wallace, including The Wooing of Malkatoon and Commodus.

Pan the Beguiler (1898, watercolour, 23 x 17") depicts two mermaids sprawled upon the rocks, and listening intently to Pan, who is playing his flute as the waves break against the shore. The god's back is turned to the viewer.

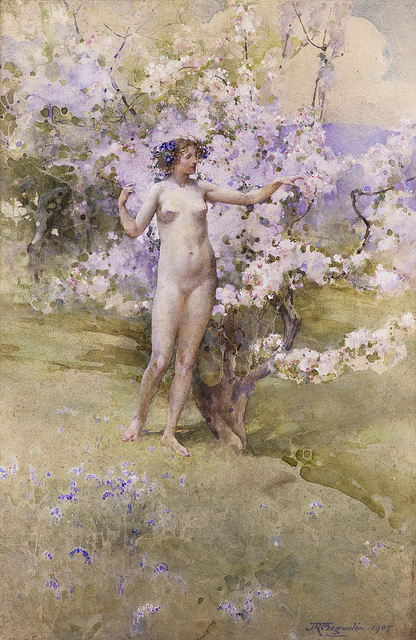
Cherry Blossom (1905).

The Mermaid of Zennor (1900, watercolour), also known as The Mermaid Discovered, features a man wearing renaissance garb, standing on a flight of stone stairs leading down to the water, and staring in astonishment at the young woman draped across the stones at the base. Her hair is red, and she is unclad from the waist up; from the waist down she has pink fins. The picture alludes to the legend of the Mermaid of Zennor who lives at Pendour Cove, near the Cornish village of Zennor.

The Rainbow Lies in the Curve of the Sand (1901) features a mermaid sitting in the midst of a winding stream emptying into the sea across a sandy beach. She has long, red hair, her fish tail is green with red fins, and she rests in blue and purple water between golden bars of sand. Green waves, capped by white foam, break realistically in the background.

Cherry Blossom (1905, watercolour, 21 x 14 1/4") features a young woman, nude, with a garland of purple flowers, surrounded by the blossoms of a small cherry growing from a low spot. The landscape is covered with spring grass, in which hyacinths are growing.

In The Magic of Pan's Flute (1905, watercolour, 20 3/4 x 13 3/4"), the god Pan sits on a tree root, his back to the viewer, playing on a flute. On the opposite side of the twisted and gnarled tree stands a naked nymph, listening attentively. She is wearing flowers in her long, golden hair. Scattered rays of sunlight penetrate the misty forest, vaguely depicted in greens and purples.

A Pastoral (1905, watercolour, 15 x 21") depicts a nude woman, seated at the edge of a small wood with her back to the viewer, playing a flute as sheep graze nearby. She wears a garland in her hair. The foreground is in shadow, with sunlight visible through the trees. Shrubs in blossom and the size of the sheep suggest springtime.

Shepherd and Lambs in a Field before a Windmill (1908, watercolour, 53 x 35 cm) features a shepherd in a plaid shirt, his back turned to the viewer, standing in a tranquil field with sheep and lambs.

Gladsome Spring (1911, watercolour) depicts two maids frolicking in a flower-filled meadow. They have garlands in their hair, and a train of yellow blossoms extends between them.

In Mermaid (1911, watercolour, 25 x 36 cm), the subject sits on a rock by the seashore. The water is turquoise, and the sky filled with purplish clouds. The mermaid tilts her head and looks toward the viewer, as she arranges her long blonde tresses.

The Sleeping Mermaid (1911, watercolour) features a mermaid sprawled across a sunny beach, a string of shells by her outstretched hand. Green waves roll in behind her, and the shore curves around into a rocky headland, overlooking the wine-dark sea.

== Other works ==
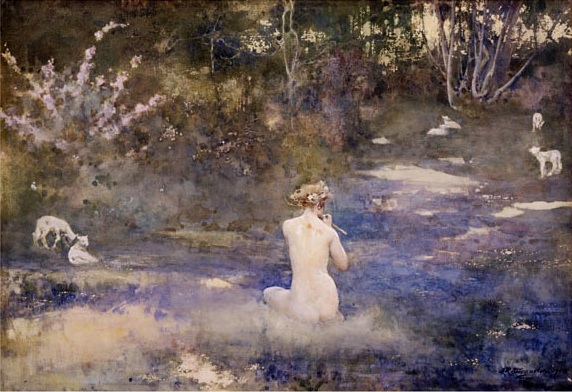
A Pastoral (1905).

- Blossoms from a Roman Garden (1885, 29 x 19")
- The Captive Dryad (1903, watercolour)
- The Clerk and the Farmer's Wife (watercolour), from "Little Claus and Big Claus," by Hans Christian Andersen
- A Cornish Shore (1903, watercolour)
- Down to the Summer Sea (1884, 17")
- Evoë Bacche (1882) was exhibited at the Grosvenor Gallery.
- Flowers from a Roman Garden, possibly the same as Blossoms from a Roman Garden
- Iris and Cherry Bloom (1903, watercolour)
- The King's Commands (watercolour, 20 x 36")
- A Libation (19")
- Libation to the Nymph (1883)
- Maidens (watercolour, 20 x 28")
- The Mermaid on the Sea Shore
- Mrs. Jefferson (oil on canvas, 9 1/2 x 7") is a portrait of a woman, head and shoulders, in a white dress.
- The Racing Nymphs (watercolour)
- A Real Princess
- Rose Petals (watercolour, 28 x 20")
- Saturnalia
- A Secret (1883)
- A Serving Girl Wearing a Garland of Ivy (watercolour, 83 x 36 cm)
- Shepherd and Lambs in a Field before a Windmill (1908, watercolour, 53 x 35 cm)
- Solutis Gratiæ Zonis (1902, watercolour)
- Spring Blossoms and Youth (1904, watercolour, 15 1/2 x 20 3/4")
- Summer Afternoon (1886)
- Under the Hollow Hung Ocean Green
- Vanity Fair (1888, oil on canvas, 24 x 19cm) – head and shoulders of young woman wearing a bonnet
- Wishes

== See also ==
- Lucy Weiglin, his half sister
