= Sywell Aerodrome =

Airfield in Northamptonshire, England

Sywell Aerodrome Northampton/Sywell Aerodrome
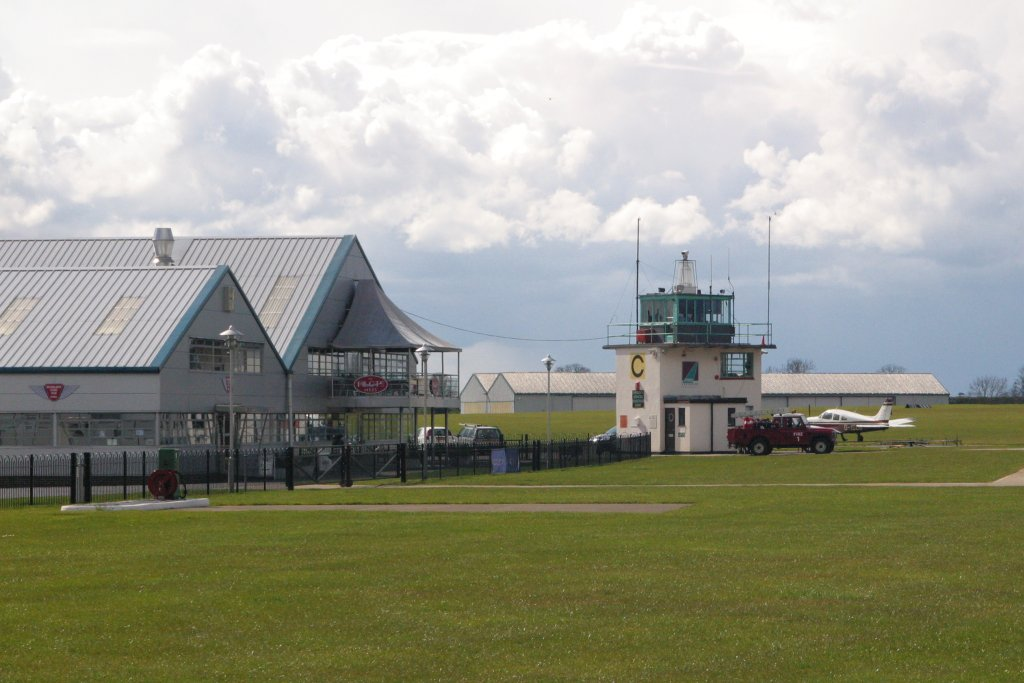
- IATA: ORM; ICAO: EGBK

Summary
- Airport type: Private
- Owner/Operator: Sywell Aerodrome Ltd.
- Serves: Northampton, Wellingborough, Kettering and Rushden
- Location: Northampton, Northamptonshire, England
- Elevation AMSL: 424 ft / 129 m
- Coordinates: 52°18′22″N 000°47′32″W

Map
- Location in Northamptonshire

Runways
Direction	Length		Surface
Direction	m	ft	Surface
03R/21L	671	2,201	Grass
05/23	602	1,975	Grass
03L/21R	1,258	4,127	Concrete
14/32	799	2,621	Grass
- Sources: UK AIP at NATS

Sywell Aerodrome (IATA: ORM, ICAO: EGBK) is the local aerodrome serving the towns of Northampton, Wellingborough, Kettering and Rushden, as well as wider Northamptonshire, England. The aerodrome is located 6 miles (9.7 km) northeast of Northampton and was originally opened in 1928 on the edge of Sywell village.

The aerodrome caters for private flying, flight training and corporate flights. There is a fixed-wing flying school, a microlight school and a helicopter school. The 1930s Art Deco hotel (built in 1934 as the Northamptonshire Aero Club clubhouse) has bar and restaurant facilities. Aviation related industries and businesses are also located at the aerodrome. A viewing area is provided for aircraft spotters where the airfield memorial is located. The Pilots' Mess cafe is also located on site and the large Hangar One venue hosts many events throughout the year.

== Second World War ==
The aerodrome opened in 1928 and during the Second World War the aerodrome, as RAF Sywell, was used as a training facility (de Havilland Tiger Moths) and later an important centre for the repair of Vickers Wellington bombers; extensive sheds from this time still remain on the site. Sywell also produced nearly 100 Avro Lancasters from 1942 to 1943. Among the Second World War pilots who underwent training at Sywell were Pierre Clostermann and Paddy Finucane, who soloed here.

The following units were here at some point:

- No. 4 Basic Flying Training School RAF (1951–53) using Chipmunk T.10s
- No. 6 Elementary and Reserve Flying Training School RAF
- No. 6 Elementary Flying Training School RAF
- No. 6 Reserve Flying School RAF
- No. 8 Air Observer & Navigator School RAF
- No. 8 Civil Air Navigation School RAF

Aerial shots for the film Battle of Britain were taken over the airport and nearby area.

== Expansion ==
In 1999, the aerodrome sought planning permission for a hard runway, which was intended to allow operations to continue over the winter, when the grass runways often become waterlogged. The organisations STARE (Stop The Aerodrome Runway Expansion) and CPRE (Campaign to Protect Rural England) campaigned against this change, arguing that it would lead to more and larger aircraft flying over the area and disturb its "rural tranquility".

Permission was granted for the runway on 22 November 2007 by the Department for Transport, and though campaigners vowed to fight the decision they were unsuccessful and construction of the runway began in 2008. It opened during summer 2009 and enabled safe operations during the winter of 2009–2010 and onwards. In February 2010, the final inspection of the newly completed all-weather hard runway was carried out by the CAA who confirmed that it could be licensed for use. In recent years airfield lighting and approach aids have been installed to enable night training and operations to be carried out albeit at present this is infrequent.

== Operations ==
Sywell has two all-grass operational runways and a third all-weather concrete runway. The aerodrome's operational hours are 0900–1700 during winter and 0800-1700 during summer. The aerodrome offers an Aerodrome Flight Information Service to pilots. The tower frequency is 122.705 mhz. Non Sywell-based aircraft are required to PPR (Prior Permission Required).

The Aerodrome provides fuel ( JET A1, AVGAS 100LL & MOGAS) inside and outside operating hours (the latter self-service) and has a Category 1 (CAT 1) Rescue & Fire Service (RFFS) during operating hours equipped with Land Rover and Dodge Ram appliances.

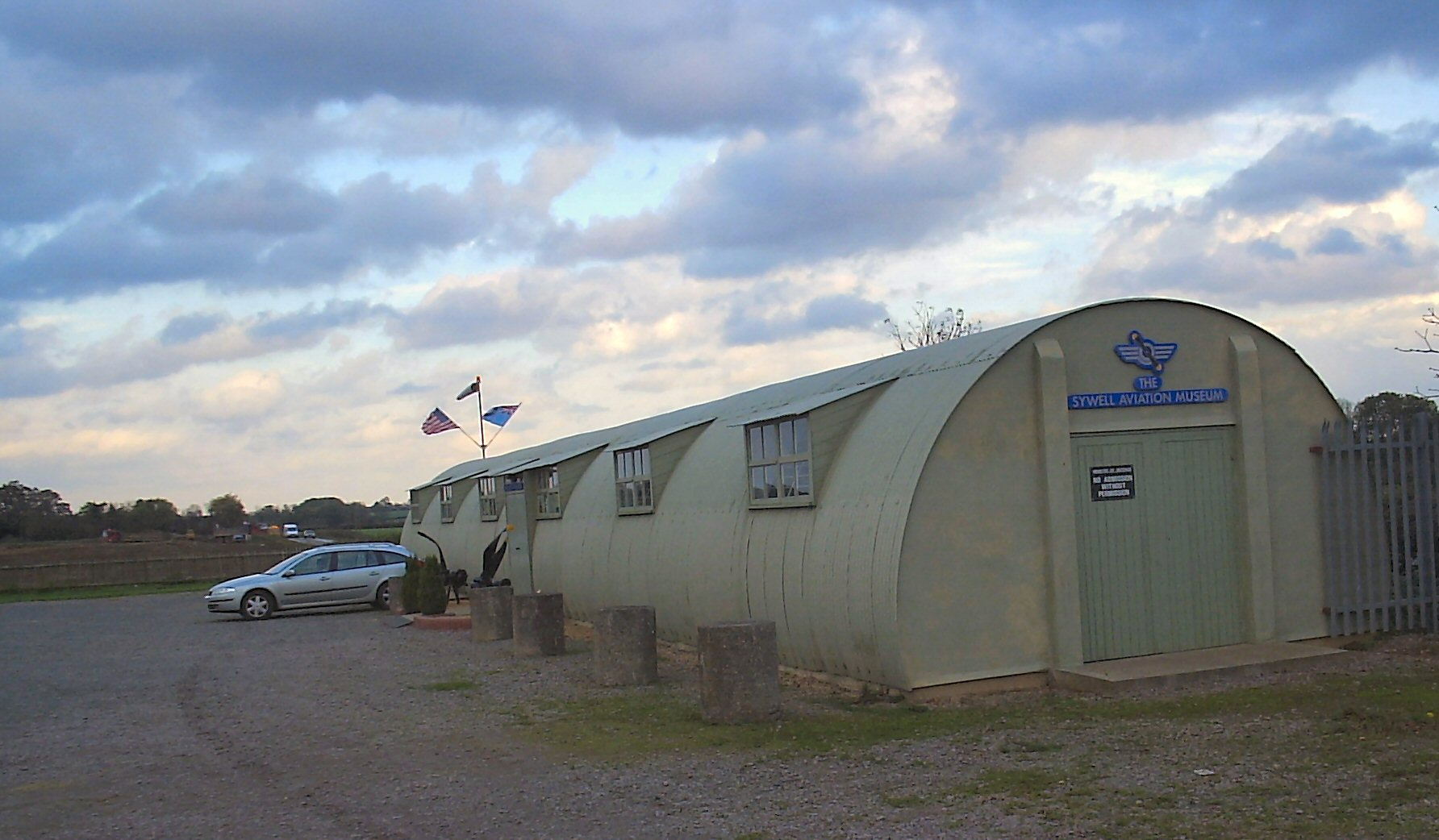
The museum in 2005

=== Sywell Aviation Museum ===
In 2000, construction began on the Sywell Aviation Museum. It was completed in 2001 and opened by Alex Henshaw who had test-flown Vickers Wellingtons on the site during the Second World War. The Museum contains many artefacts and models telling the story of the site and the airmen who served there. Originally it comprised three Nissen huts, it was expanded from 2010 to 2012. with the addition of two more Nissen huts, and, in the summer of 2012, the museum acquired a Hawker Hunter airframe.

In March 2021 the Museum acquired its second complete aircraft 1969 built Handley Page Jetstream 200 G-RAVL. Jetstream aircraft were built at Sywell Aerodrome from 1971 to 1972 and this machine was not only the parent company (Jetstream Ltd) demonstrator but also won the Daily Express National Air Race Challenge Cup on 12 June 1971 in a race from Sywell to Biggin Hill which was televised on the BBC.

The Museum is a volunteer-run charitable trust and entry is free. It opens between Easter and September on weekends and bank holidays.

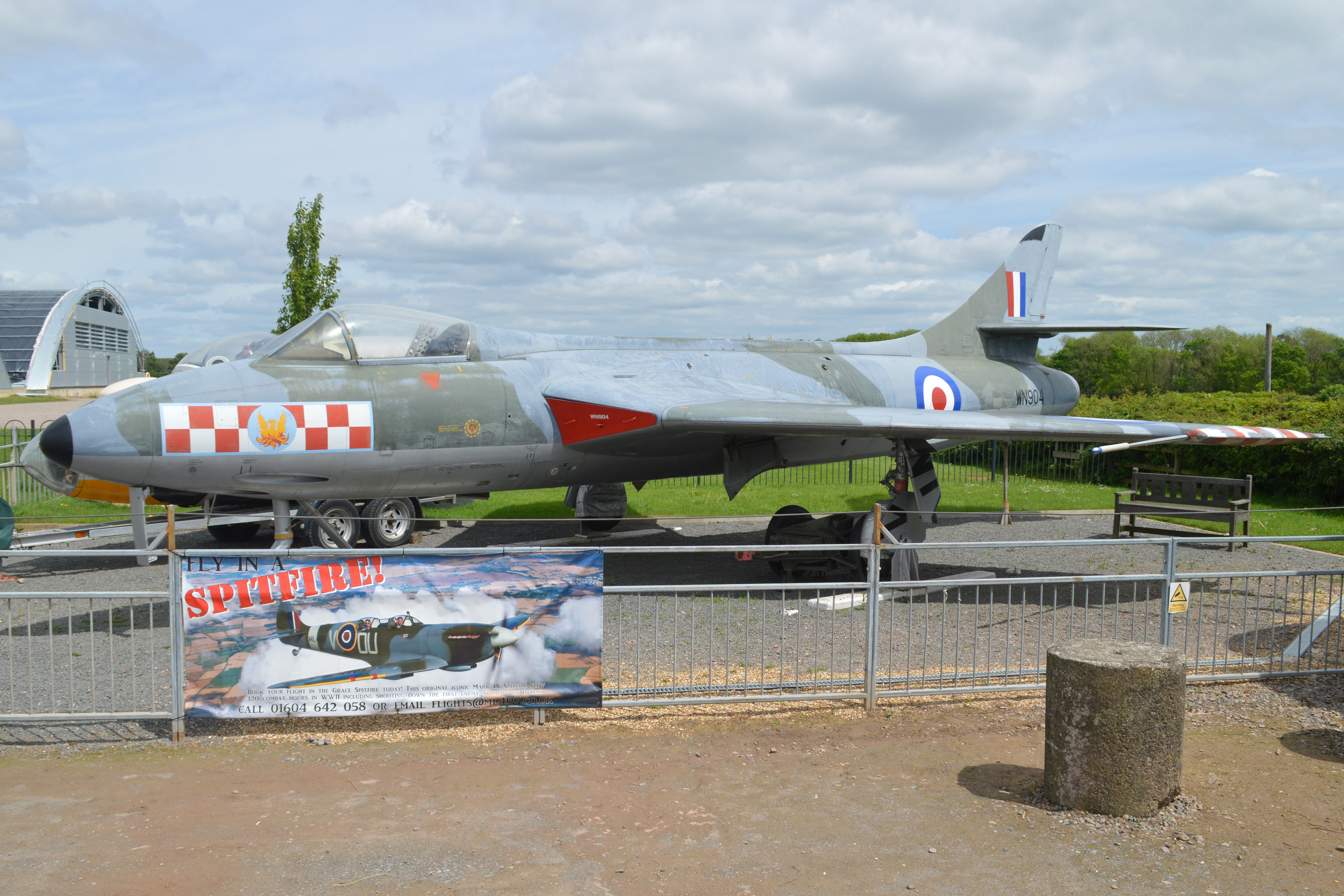
The museum's Hawker Hunter

=== The Aviator Hotel ===
The original 1930s Clubhouse was developed over the years, becoming a 'motel' in the 1960s. By the late 1990s the building was restored to its Art Deco glory and a further accommodation block added in a similar architectural style. The 3 star hotel now boasts 50 en suite rooms, a bar and restaurant and several function rooms. The Clubhouse, The Cockpit and The Briefing Room are small meeting rooms often used by local clubs and societies. The Cirrus Room is larger and caters for small events and weddings. Hangar One is a large function space with its own bar and dancefloor which caters for larger corporate events, fairs and weddings.

Regular events at the aerodrome include car festivals, the 'Pistons and Props' show in September (AKA 'The Sywell Classic'), craft fairs, balls, weddings, rallies, fly ins, and 'car experience' days by 'Car Chase Heroes'.

The Pilots' Mess Cafe

Located adjacent to the control tower the cafe provides food and drink to visitors.

=== Brooklands Flying Club ===
Brooklands Flying Club was based at Sywell, with a fleet of four Aero AT-3 aircraft and a Cessna 172. Two of the AT-3s are now operated by Cabaero - see below.

The club opened in 2005 under the same name of the previous company that had been located on the airfield but closed in 2021.

The Northamptonshire School of Flying (NSF) was formerly based at Sywell moved to Sibson, Cambs in the 2000s and rebranded as Peterborough Aero Club.

=== Brooklands Engineering ===
Brooklands Engineering was formed in October 2005 as an EASA approved Part-145 and PART-ML (Part-CAO) Maintenance organisation. It ceased trading in 2023.

=== Brooklands Executive Air Travel ===
BEAT briefly operated a Piper PA-31 Chieftain G-SYLL for executive charter from the aerodrome.

=== Training & Sales ===
Other flight training/maintenance organisations on the airfield include:

- Sloane Helicopters – helicopter training, sales and service of Robinson/Leonardo helicopters
- Flylight Airsports – microlight training plus sales, manufacture, service of microlights
- Cabaero Aviation- fixed wing Group A aircraft training, trial lessons and experiences with 2x AT-3, Robin 2160 & Piper PA28 aircraft
- Cirrus Aircraft (UK) - sales of Cirrus Aircraft and associated services
- Skytech Helicopters - specialising in the maintenance of Hughes/MD Helicopters products and other rotorcraft
- The Thomas Castle Aviation Heritage Trust - formed following the passing of Thomas Castle in 2019, the Trust operates DH Tiger Moth G-ANTE and provides scholarships and flight experiences.

In January 2023, the Blades announced that their 2022 season was their last and that they would be disbanding after 17 years of operations. 2 Excel, the parent company of the Blades, also have subsidiary businesses at the aerodrome and under the 2Excel Broadsword banner operate air charter services with types ranging from a Beech King Air to a Boeing 737. They also undertake work for the UK Government most especially the UK Maritime & Coastguard Agency and Oil Spill Response using a modified Boeing 727 aircraft.

=== Air Leasing/Ultimate Warbirds ===
In January 2016, Air Leasing Ltd, operators of the famous 'Grace Spitfire'- Supermarine Spitfire TR.9 ML407 'OU-V' moved to Sywell Aerodrome. Initially based in a single new build 'blister' type hangar named 'The Spitfire Blister' but known locally as 'Graceland' – they have now expanded to fill two more. AL specialise in the maintenance and restoration of vintage 'warbird' type aircraft such as the Spitfire, Hurricane, P-51 Mustang and Sea Fury.

A subsidiary, Ultimate Warbird Flights, operate several two-seat warbirds for trial experience flights in Spitfire, Mustang, and Hispano Buchon aircraft. Four of the resident warbirds operate as the Ultimate Fighters display team – usually displaying Mustang, Spitfire, Hispano Buchon and Thunderbolt aircraft across the UK and Europe.

=== Sywell Airshow ===
The Aerodrome has hosted many airshows and fly ins over the years.

From 2004 to 2014 it hosted a bi-enniel charity airshow in aid of the local Air Ambulance where there were many classic aircraft flying and on display such as the Consolidated Catalina, North American P-51 Mustang, North American Harvards. The airshow is no longer hosted as of 2016, after the Shoreham Airshow crash. On 6 November 2020 flying legends announced its signature airshow, previously held at the IWM Duxford, would now transfer to Sywell Aerodrome. Cancelled in 2020 & 2021 due to COVID, the show was due to take place in 2022 but was subsequently also cancelled,

The Sywell Airshow 2024 took place on the 22 and 23 June.

After the passing of principal organiser Richard Grace in 2024, it was announced that the show would not be returning in 2025 but an airshow 'in another form' may take place in the future.

=== Light Aircraft Association Rally ===
The Light Aircraft Association (LAA – formerly the Popular Flying Association), is one of the UK's several bodies supporting amateur aircraft construction, and recreational and sport flying. It used to hold its annual rally at Cranfield Airport, and then at Kemble Airport. In 2006, the LAA lost so much money through poor attendances resulting from poor weather that in 2007 and 2008, much smaller (and cheaper) "regional rallies" were held. These were unpopular and in September 2009 a revived LAA Rally was held at Sywell. This proved successful, and further well-attended rallies have taken place at Sywell since.

In recent years the LAA Rally has been held at other locations in the UK.

=== Previous events and users ===
Music in Flight was held at Sywell in the early 21st century. This combined orchestral music classical music with flying aircraft, hot air balloons, the Red Devils parachute display team and a fireworks display. The event subsequently moved to Biggin Hill.

Previous 'aviation experience' users of the aerodrome were Virgin Balloons, Warbird Experiences and Delta Aviation.

== Business park ==
An industrial area in the complex accommodates firms, agencies and other commercial businesses. Some 138 business were registered as being based at the Aerodrome in 2025.
