= List of museums in Northamptonshire =

This list contains the museums in Northamptonshire, England, defined as institutions (including nonprofit organizations, government entities, and private businesses) that collect and care for objects of cultural, artistic, scientific, or historical interest and make their collections or related exhibits available for public viewing. Also included are non-profit art galleries and university art galleries. Museums that exist only in cyberspace (i.e. virtual museums) are not included.

Name	Image	Town/City	Type	Summary
78 Derngate		Northampton	Historic house	Renovated house with interiors by architect Charles Rennie Mackintosh, contemporary craft gallery
Abington Park Museum		Northampton	Multiple	Local history, costumes, leather, Northamptonshire Regiment
Althorp		Althorp	Historic house	Country estate with gardens and grounds, owned by Charles Spencer, 9th Earl Spencer, girlhood home of Diana, Princess of Wales
Boughton House		Kettering	Historic house	Estate home of the Duke of Buccleuch, with fine art, gardens
Burton Latimer Heritage Museum		Burton Latimer	Local	operated by the Burton Latimer Heritage Society
The Canal Museum		Stoke Bruerne	Canal	History of canals in Britain
Canons Ashby House		Canons Ashby	Historic house	Operated by the National Trust, Elizabethan manor house
Carpetbagger Aviation Museum		Harrington	Aviation	History of RAF Harrington and the 801st Bombardment Group (Provisional)
Corby Heritage Centre		Corby	Local	
Cottesbrooke Hall		Creaton	Historic house	18th-century Queen Anne-style house, gardens and park
Daventry Museum		Daventry	Local	
Deene Park		Corby	Historic house	Medieval manor house with rooms from many periods, gardens
Desborough Heritage Centre		Desborough	Local	
East Carlton Park Steel Heritage Centre		East Carlton	Local history	Features displays about local history and the development of the iron and steel industry in the town
Irchester Narrow Gauge Railway Museum		Irchester	Railway	Steam and diesel locomotives, lifesize diorama of a quarry, industrial and railroad artefacts
Jeyes of Earls Barton Museums		Earls Barton	Multiple	gift, teddy bear and doll house shop with coffee shop and several museums: Earls Barton Museum of Village Life, Jeyes Heritage & Pharmacy Museum, and a model funfair
Kelmarsh Hall		Kelmarsh	Historic house	18th-century manor house and gardens
Kettering Museum and Art Gallery		Kettering	Multiple	includes the Manor House Museum with exhibits of local history and culture, and the Alfred East Art Gallery for local art
Kirby Hall		Northampton	Historic house	Operated by English Heritage, Elizabethan country house in a semi-ruined state with gardens
Lamport Hall		Lamport	Historic house	Tudor home and gardens; also includes Hannington Vintage Tractor Club and Museum with farm equipment
Long Buckby Museum		Long Buckby	Local	
Museum of Leathercraft		Northampton	Fashion	located in the Grosvenor shopping centre, development of leathercraft
Northampton Museum and Art Gallery		Northampton	Multiple	Shoe collection, art, decorative arts, local history
Northamptonshire Ironstone Railway Trust		Hunsbury Hill	Railway	Heritage railway and museum
Oundle Museum		Oundle	Local history	
Piddington Villa Museum		Piddington	Archaeology	Artefacts and remains of a large Roman villa
Prebendal Manor House		Nassington	Historic house	
Rockingham Castle		Corby	Historic house	Former royal castle and hunting lodge with gardens, grounds
Rothwell Arts and Heritage Centre		Rothwell	Multiple	local history, art
Rushden Museum		Rushden	Local	local history especially the shoe industry
Rushden Transport Museum		Rushden	Railway	Railway memorabilia, rolling stock, road transport vehicles
Southwick Hall		Southwick	Historic house	medieval manor house, gardens, grounds
Sulgrave Manor		Sulgrave	Historic house	Ancestral home of the family of George Washington, reflects Tudor through Georgian eras
Sywell Aviation Museum		Sywell	Aviation	Former World War II aerodrome with artefacts, recovered airplane wreckage, local aviation history
Wellingborough Museum		Wellingborough	Local	local history, culture
Wollaston Museum		Wollaston	Local	information, local history, culture, industry

== See also ==
- Category:Tourist attractions in Northamptonshire
