= Lays of Ancient Rome =

1842 poetry collection by Thomas Macaulay

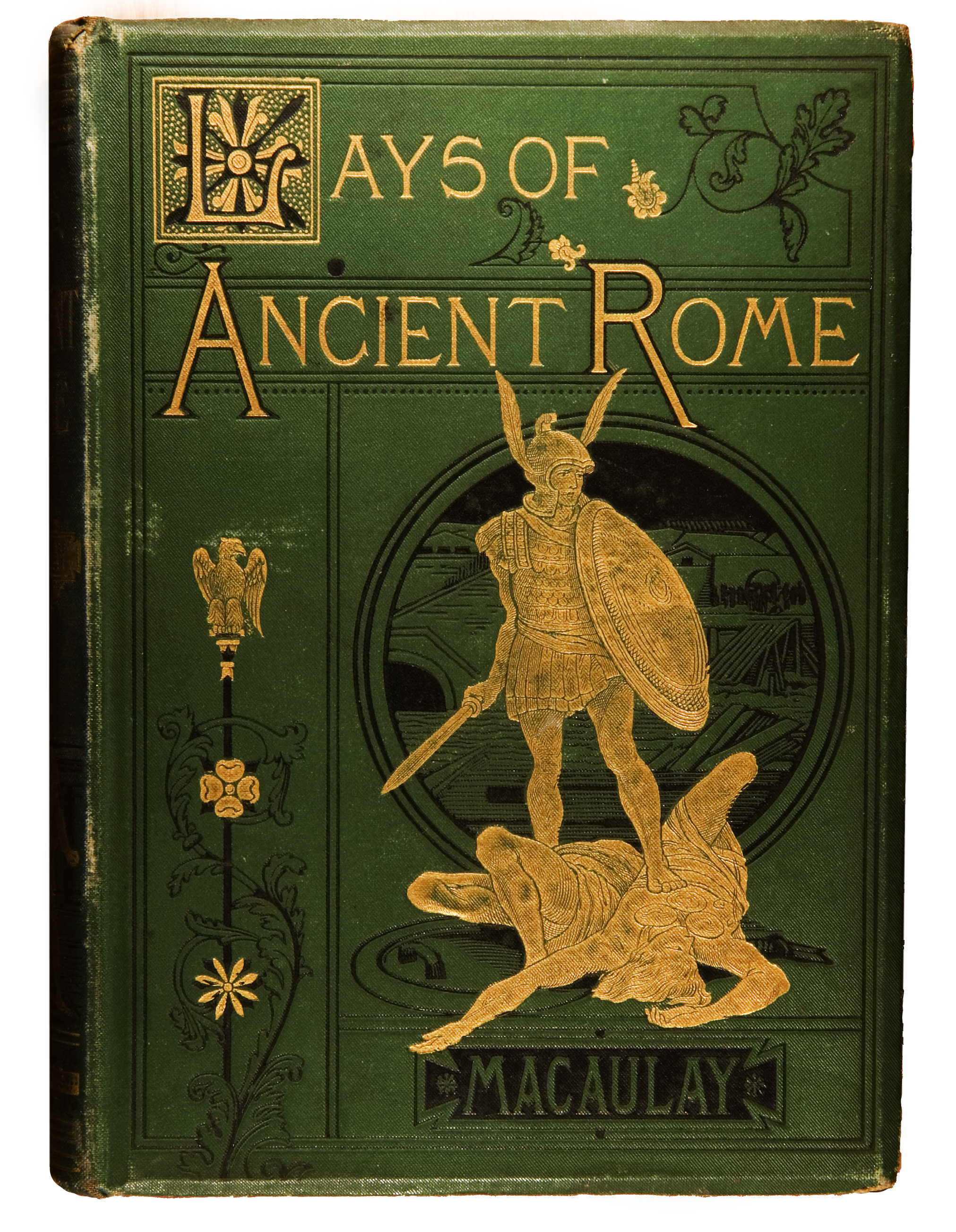
Lays of Ancient Rome, 1881 edition

Lays of Ancient Rome is an 1842 collection of narrative poems, or lays, by Thomas Babington Macaulay. Four of these recount heroic episodes from early Roman history with strong dramatic and tragic themes, giving the collection its name. Macaulay also included two poems inspired by recent history: Ivry (1824) and The Armada (1832).

== Overview ==
The Lays were composed by Macaulay in his thirties, during his spare time while he was the "legal member" of the Governor-General of India's Supreme Council from 1834 to 1838. He later wrote of them:

The plan occurred to me in the jungle at the foot of the Neilgherry hills; and most of the verses were made during a dreary sojourn at Ootacamund and a disagreeable voyage in the Bay of Bengal.

The Roman ballads are preceded by brief introductions, discussing the legends from a scholarly perspective. Macaulay explains that his intention was to write poems resembling those that might have been sung in ancient times.

The Lays were first published by Longman in 1842. They became immensely popular, and were a regular subject of recitation, then a common pastime. The Lays were standard reading in British public schools for more than a century. Winston Churchill memorised them while at Harrow School, in order to show that he was capable of mental prodigies, notwithstanding his lacklustre academic performance.

== Contents ==
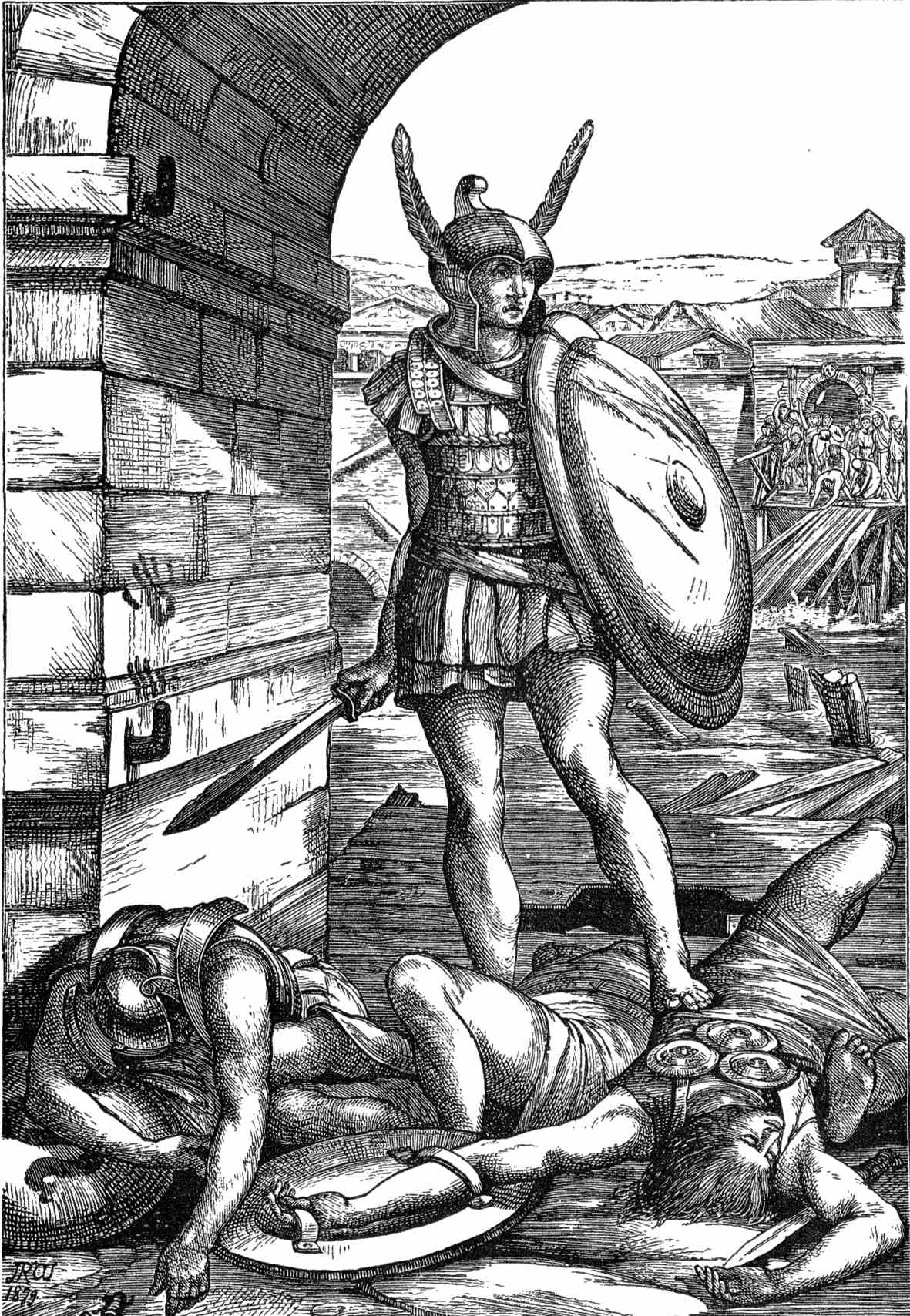
Horatius defending the Sublician bridge, illustrated by John Reinhard Weguelin for the 1881 edition.

=== Horatius ===
The first poem, Horatius, describes how Publius Horatius and two companions, Spurius Larcius and Titus Herminius, hold the Sublician bridge, the only span crossing the Tiber at Rome, against the Etruscan army of Lars Porsena, King of Clusium. The three heroes are willing to die in order to prevent the enemy from crossing the bridge, and sacking the otherwise ill-defended city. While the trio close with the front ranks of the Etruscans, Roman engineers hurriedly work to demolish the bridge, leaving their enemies on the far side of the swollen river.

This poem contains the often-quoted lines:

Then out spake brave Horatius,
The Captain of the Gate:
"To every man upon this earth
Death cometh soon or late.
And how can man die better
Than facing fearful odds,
For the ashes of his fathers,
And the temples of his Gods."

Haul down the bridge, Sir Consul,
With all the speed ye may;
I, with two more to help me,
Will hold the foe in play.
In yon strait path a thousand
May well be stopped by three.
Now who will stand on either hand,
And keep the bridge with me?

As the span becomes unstable, the city Fathers urge Horatius, Lartius and Herminius to retreat, but Horatius remains behind alone. His companions regain the Roman side before the bridge begins to collapse, but Horatius can no longer cross to safety, and therefore leaps into the river, still fully armoured. Macaulay writes,

No sound of joy or sorrow
Was heard from either bank;
But friends and foes in dumb surprise,
With parted lips and straining eyes,
Stood gazing where he sank:
And when above the surges
They saw his crest appear,
All Rome sent forth a rapturous cry,
And even the ranks of Tuscany
Could scarce forbear to cheer.

He reaches the Roman shore, is richly rewarded, and gains mythic status by his act of bravery:

With weeping and with laughter
Still is the story told,
How well Horatius kept the bridge
In the brave days of old.

=== The Battle of Lake Regillus ===
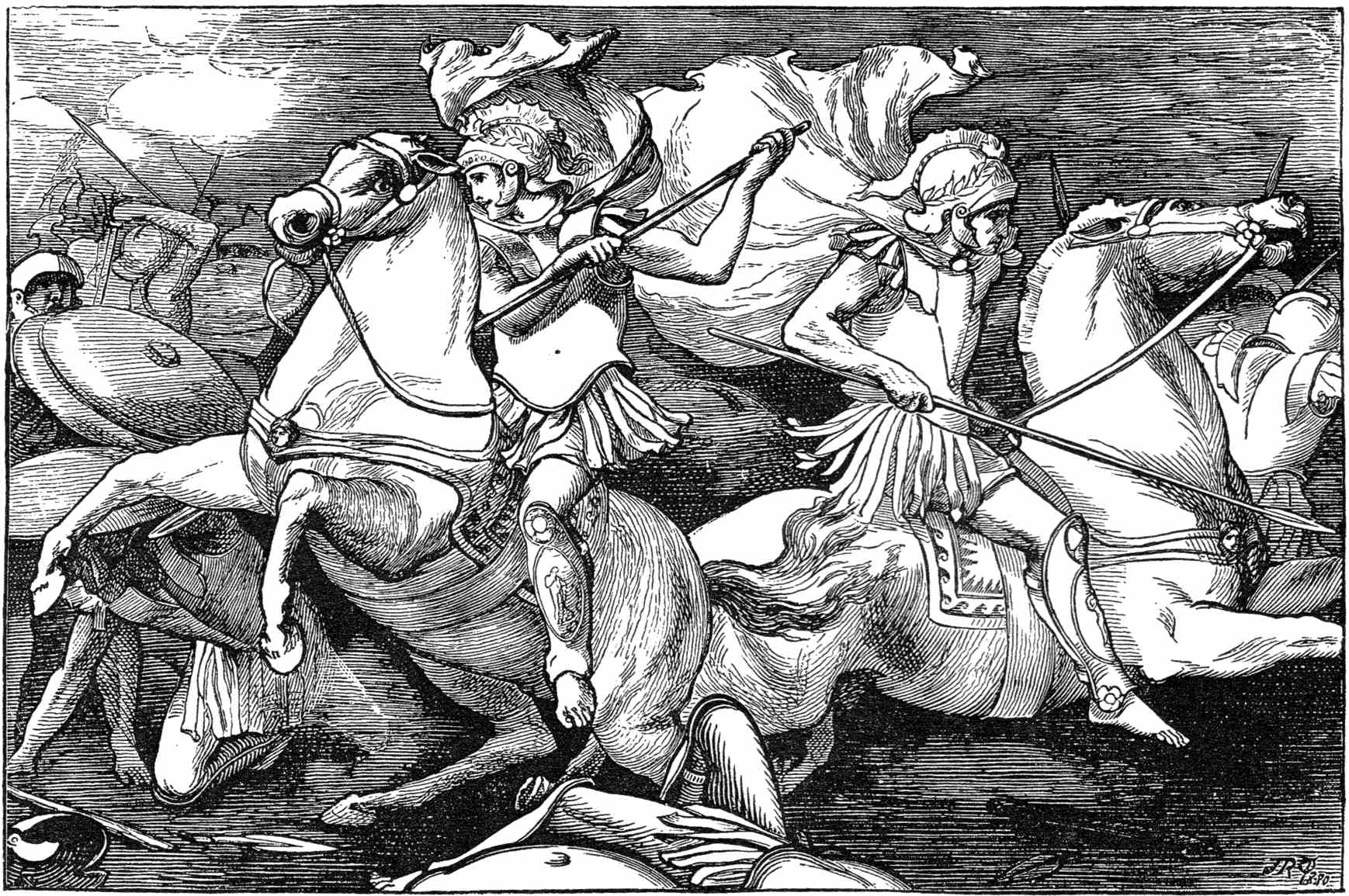
John Reinhard Weguelin: 'Castor and Pollux fighting at the Battle of Lake Regillus', from the 1881 edition.

The next poem, The Battle of Lake Regillus, celebrates the Roman victory over the Latin League at the Battle of Lake Regillus. Several years after the retreat of Lars Porsena and the Etruscans, Rome was threatened by a Latin army led by the deposed Roman king, Lucius Tarquinius Superbus, together with his son, Titus Tarquinius, and his son-in-law, Octavius Mamilius, prince of Tusculum.

This poem includes a number of single-combats described in fine detail, in conscious imitation of Homer's Iliad.

All round them paused the battle,
While met in mortal fray
The Roman and the Tusculan,
The horses black and gray.
Herminius smote Mamilius
Through breast-plate and through breast,
And fast flowed out the purple blood
Over the purple vest.
Mamilius smote Herminius
Through head-piece and through head,
And side by side those chiefs of pride,
Together fell down dead.
Down fell they dead together
In a great lake of gore;
And still stood all who saw them fall
While men might count a score.

The fighting described by Macaulay is fierce and bloody, and the outcome is only decided when the twin gods Castor and Pollux descend to the battlefield on the side of Rome.

So spake he; and was buckling
Tighter black Auster's band,
When he was aware of a princely pair
That rode at his right hand.
So like they were, no mortal
Might one from other know:
White as snow their armour was:
Their steeds were white as snow.
Never on earthly anvil
Did such rare armour gleam;
And never did such gallant steeds
Drink of an earthly stream.

=== Virginia ===
The poem Virginia describes the tragedy of Virginia, the only daughter of Virginius, a poor Roman farmer. The wicked Appius Claudius, a member of one of Rome's most noble patrician families, and head of the college of decemvirs, desires the beautiful and virtuous Virginia. He initiates legal proceedings, claiming Virginia as his "runaway slave", knowing that his claim will be endorsed by the corrupt magistracy over which he and his cronies preside. Driven to despair, Virginius resolves to save his daughter from Claudius' lust by any means—even her death is preferable.

Foul outrage which thou knowest not, which thou shalt never know.
Then clasp me round the neck once more, and give me one more kiss;
And now mine own dear little girl, there is no way but this."
With that he lifted high the steel, and smote her in the side,
And in her blood she sank to earth, and with one sob she died.

Virginia's sacrifice stirs the plebeians to action: their violent outbursts lead to the overthrow of the decemvirs, and the introduction of the Valerio-Horatian laws, which increased the power and added to the political strength of the plebeians.

=== The Prophecy of Capys ===
The Prophecy of Capys narrates how when Romulus and Remus arrive in triumph at the house of their grandfather, Capys, the blind old man enters a prophetic trance. He foretells the future greatness of Romulus' descendants, and their ultimate victory over their enemies in the Pyrrhic and Punic wars.

Thine, Roman, is the pilum:
Roman, the sword is thine,
The even trench, the bristling mound,
The legion's ordered line;
And thine the wheels of triumph,
Which with their laurelled train
Move slowly up the shouting streets
To Jove's eternal flame.

=== Ivry, A Song of the Huguenots ===
Originally composed in 1824, Ivry celebrates a battle won by Henry IV of France and his Huguenot forces over the Catholic League in 1590. Henry's succession to the French throne was contested by those who would not accept a Protestant king of France; his victory at Ivry against superior forces left him the only credible claimant for the crown, although he was unable to overcome all opposition until converting to Catholicism in 1593. Henry went on to issue the Edict of Nantes in 1598, granting tolerance to the French Protestants, and ending the French Wars of Religion.

=== The Armada: A Fragment ===
Written in 1832, this poem describes the arrival at Plymouth in 1588 of news of the sighting of the Spanish Armada, and the lighting of beacons to send the news to London and across England,

Till Skiddaw saw the fire that burnt on Gaunt's embattled pile,
And the red glare on Skiddaw roused the burghers of Carlisle.

The Armada was sent by Philip II of Spain with the goal of conveying an army of invasion to England, and deposing the Protestant Queen Elizabeth. The supposedly invincible fleet was thwarted by a combination of vigilance, tactics that took advantage of the size and poor maneuverability of the Armada's ships, and a series of other misfortunes.

== Cultural references ==
Lays of Ancient Rome has been reprinted on numerous occasions. An 1881 edition, lavishly illustrated by John Reinhard Weguelin, has frequently been republished. Countless schoolchildren have encountered the work as a means of introducing them to history, poetry, and the moral values of courage, self-sacrifice, and patriotism that Macaulay extolled.

The Lays sold well in America and had a profound impact on the generation that would fight the Civil War. On June 27, 1864, Ohio Colonel Daniel McCook Jr. prepared his brigade to advance toward Confederate positions at Kennesaw Mountain, Georgia, by reciting the phrase from "Horatius" beginning "For how can man die better / Than facing fearful odds..." More than thirty years later, Lieutenant J. T. Holmes wrote, "I recalled McCook's death song as he strode through the brigade and the actual work before us, of which we had been advised, began to dawn clearly on all minds. It was doubtless a spontaneous quotation, but very appropriate to inspire the patriotic feeling and, if we had been Roman soldiery, a trust in the care of the gods. It was a heathen refrain, but impregnated with love of country and kith and kin and duty owed to them all."

As a teenager, Winston Churchill won a Harrow School award for memorising and declaiming all 1,200 lines (Note: So related by Lehrman, but this number is anecdotal: "Horatius" only includes 589 lines. Combined, "Horatius", "The Battle of Lake Regillus", "Virginia", and "The Prophecy of Capys" include 2,245 lines.) of Macaulay's text. In the films Into the Storm (2009) and Darkest Hour (2017), he is depicted reciting Horatius' speech while Prime Minister during the Second World War.

Horatius' speech is included at the Chushul war memorial at Rezang La in memory of the 13th Battalion, Kumaon Regiment of the Indian Army. The phrase "how can man die better" was used by Benjamin Pogrund as the title of his biography of anti-apartheid activist Robert Sobukwe.

Quotations from "Horatius" have been used in science fiction literature and films. Verses 32 and 50 of Horatius are used as epigraphs in Diane Duane's Star Trek novels, My Enemy, My Ally and The Empty Chair. Horatius' speech appears in the final book of Kevin J. Anderson's The Saga of Seven Suns, is recited in an episode of Doctor Who, and used as a plot device in the film Oblivion (2013).
