= Charles Kennedy (economist) =

Charles Kennedy (1923 – 4 November 1997) was an economist, often considered one of the finest theorists of his generation.

He was born into a large family, the youngest of five sons; he was the son of George Kennedy, an architect, and grandson of the painter Charles Napier Kennedy. A gifted child, he was educated at Gordonstoun, and entered Balliol College, Oxford at the age of seventeen. His tutor there was Thomas Balogh. Within two years he had graduated with first-class honours in Philosophy, Politics and Economics, and was immediately recruited into Lord Cherwell's statistical research group for the duration of World War II.

After the War he re-entered academia, lecturing in Economics for a year at Imperial College London and another at Balliol. In 1948 he was elected Fellow of Economics at The Queen's College, Oxford, and in 1950 gained a University lectureship. In 1955, he travelled to the West Indies, where he spent a large amount of time painting; six years later, fond memories persuaded him to leave Oxford and take up a Chair in Economics at the University of the West Indies in 1961, shortly after being married.

During his time in the West Indies, he wrote prolifically - at least by his standards - and briefly served as Deputy Vice-Chancellor of the university, as well as being a Director of the Bank of Jamaica. Due to political events, however, he decided to return to the UK, and took the Chair of Economic Theory at the University of Kent in Canterbury in 1966. He formally retired four years later, at the young age of 48, but continued teaching part-time (as the Honorary Professor of Economic Theory) until 1984. For his services to the University, he was awarded an honorary DLitt in 1984.

Kennedy was mildly eccentric; he had a phobia of libraries, and would not enter one unless accompanied, even then being distinctly uncomfortable. He was not a prolific writer - he only published around fifty papers - but his writing was of a high calibre; of those papers, sixty percent were published in the Economic Journal, Oxford Economic Papers, or the Review of Economic Studies.
