= Sywell Aviation Museum =

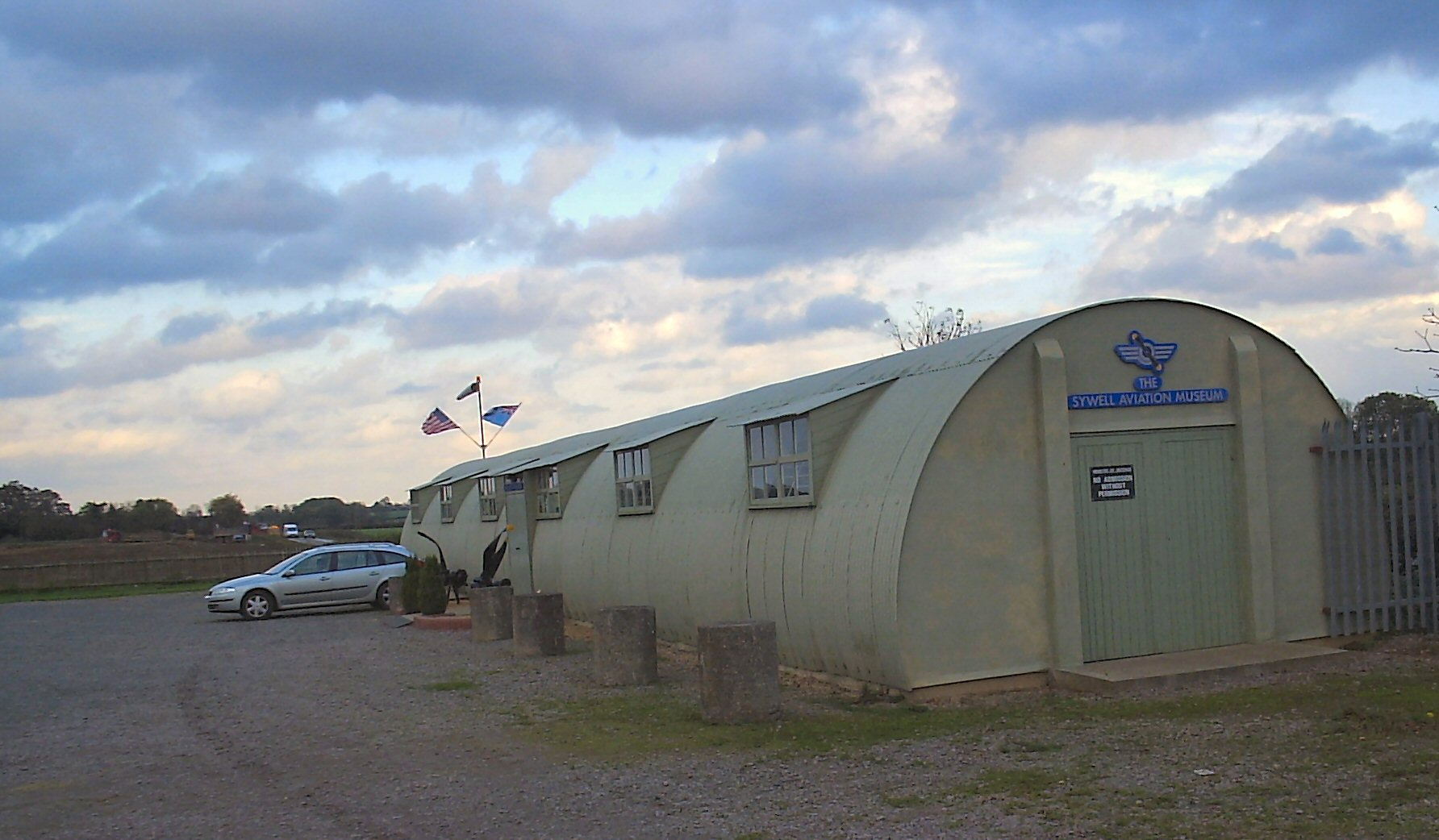

- Location within Northamptonshire
- Established: 2001
- Location: Sywell Aerodrome, Northamptonshire
- Coordinates: 52°18′7.1″N 0°47′13.7″W
- Type: Aviation museum
- Website: www.sywellaviationmuseum.org.uk

Sywell Aviation Museum is based at Sywell Aerodrome in Northamptonshire, England. It is sited in the aircraft viewing car park at the aerodrome. It documents the history of flying in Northamptonshire from the early days to the present day with particular emphasis on the Second World War. The museum is run by the Sywell Aviation Museum Trust and is run by volunteers; it is closed during the winter months and reopens each Easter Saturday.

== History ==
The Sywell Aviation Museum opened originally in May 2001 using three Nissen huts from the former USAAF airfield at Bentwaters as its buildings. These were followed in 2011 and 2012 with the addition of two more Nissen huts from a former POW camp at Snape Farm, Derbyshire. All buildings are erected in a row, making five in total.

Inside the museum can be found various displays on the history of aviation in Northamptonshire including aviation archaeology, aircraft cockpits, uniforms and models. A particular museum speciality is aircraft ordnance of which the museum has a wide variety from WW1 flechette darts to a concrete mockup of Britain's Blue Danube nuclear bomb. Missiles, rockets and bombs are also displayed, some on an original WW2 RAF bomb trolley towed by a WW2 RAF bomb tractor.

== Internal displays ==
The displays are themed into the following halls:

=== The Paul Morgan Hall ===
The Paul Morgan Hall (Sywell Hall) charts the history of Sywell and including information on the aerodrome, RAF flying training there, a wartime LINK Trainer, and the museum's de Havilland Vampire T.11 jet fighter cockpit.

=== The RAF Hall ===
The RAF Hall has displays of RAF uniforms and equipment, a complete WW2 bomb train, an Anderson shelter, wartime kitchen and extensive display on the Home Guard.

=== The Main Hall ===
The Main Hall displays archaeological remains from Vickers Wellington and B-17 Flying Fortress aircraft from local crashes. The story of WW1 in the air is also told as are the Zeppelin raids over Northamptonshire in WW1 and information about local ace Major Mick Mannock. The museum's de Havilland Chipmunk and de Havilland Rapide cockpits are available for children to try out.

=== The American Hall ===
The American Hall concentrates on three main units - the 315th Troop Carrier Group (Spanhoe), 20th Fighter Group (Kings Cliffe) and 305th Bomb Group (Chelveston) and displays original operation boards from the 20th FG, a mockup of a USAAF station armoury and B-17 cheek gunner's position. A Packard-built Merlin engine from a 20th FG North American Mustang is on display.

=== The POW/Cold War Hall ===
The POW/Cold War Hall covers the 1942 Wellingborough Blitz bombing raid, RAF escape and evasion and prisoners of war and the Cold War era, including use of THOR missiles in Northamptonshire. An Armstrong Siddeley Sapphire jet engine is displayed. which used to power the museum's Hawker Hunter.

== External displays ==
A Hawker Hunter F.2 jet fighter is displayed outside the museum - it is the only complete F.2 mark left in existence.

In March 2021, the museum's second complete airframe - Handley Page Jetstream 200 G-RAVL arrived at Sywell from Cranfield Airfield. The machine was the demonstrator for Sywell-based Jetstream Ltd in the 1970s and won the Daily Express National Air Race between Sywell-Biggin Hill on 12 June 1971. The aircraft is to be restored and used as a classroom.

== Aircraft on display ==
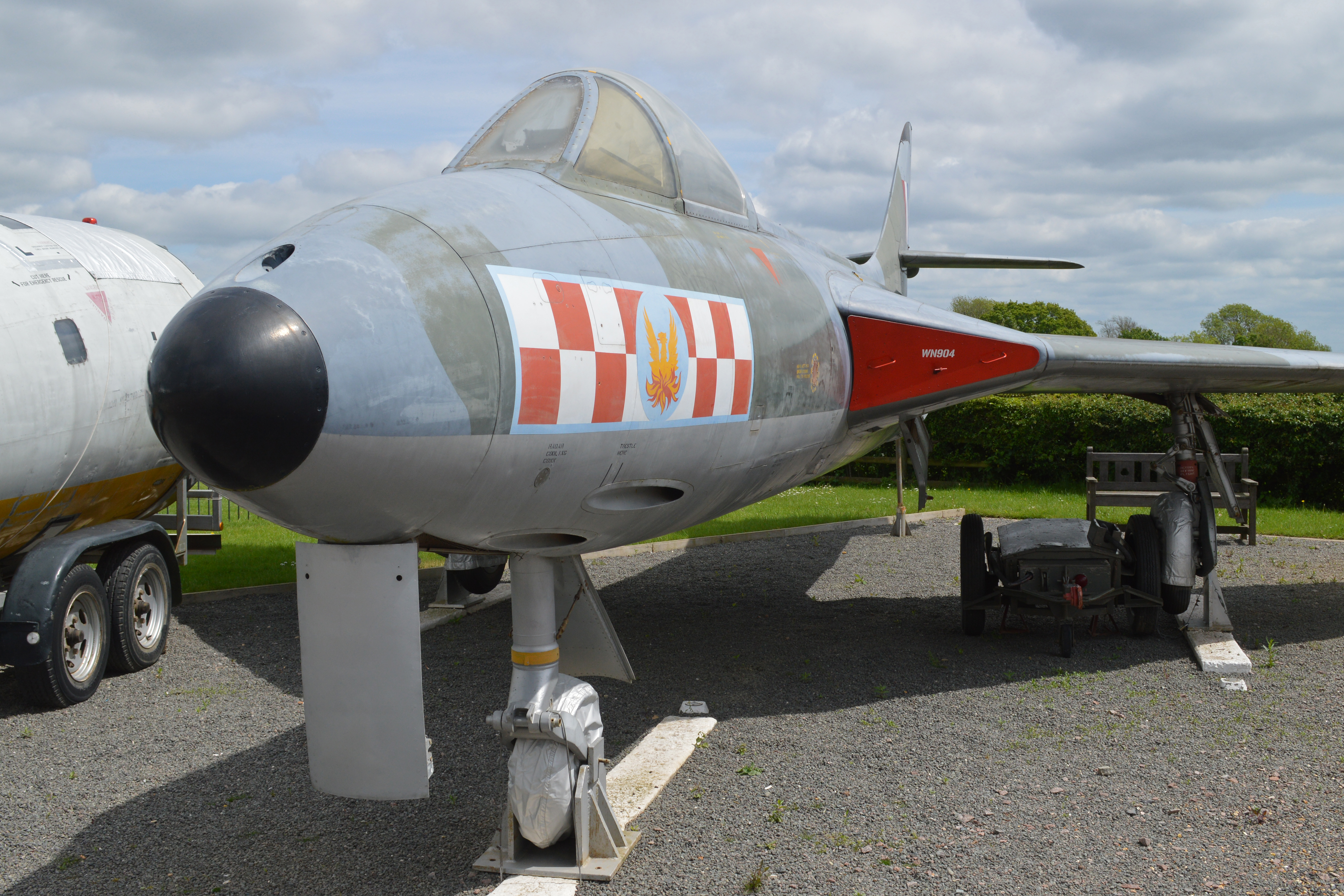
Hawker Hunter on display

- de Havilland Vampire T.11 XD599 Vicky (cockpit)
- de Havilland Canada Chipmunk T.10 WG419 Clare (cockpit)
- Hawker Hunter F.2 WN904 Heidi
- de Havilland DH.89a Dragon Rapide 'G-AJHO' Rachel (cockpit -replica)
- Slingsby Grasshopper TX.1 WZ820 (stored)
- de Havilland DH.82A Tiger Moth G-AOES Tara (cockpit, stored, under restoration)
- Handley Page HP-137 Jetstream 200 G-RAVL (ex N1035S, G-AWVK) Jenny (under restoration)

(*privately owned)

== List of awards won by Sywell Aviation Museum at the Northamptonshire Heritage Awards ==
Museum of the Year and Best Exhibition 2007

Highly Commended, Best Special Project 2011 & 2012

Best Special Project and Peoples' Choice Awards 2013

Best Community Project 2014

Highly Commended Best Community Project 2018

In July 2019 the museum won The Peoples' Choice Award at the Northamptonshire Heritage Awards voted for by the visiting public as the best Museum in Northamptonshire for 2019 and 2020.

Highly Commended Best Special Project 2021

Winner Best Event - Museum Grand Opening & 21st Birthday Party - Northants Heritage Awards October 2022

National Transport Trust Restoration Award - Jetstream Project September 2024

== Visiting information ==
The museum opens on Easter Saturday and closes usually at the end of September. It is open between 1030 and 1630 each weekend and bank holiday during its open season and selected weekday afternoons. Group visits/guided tours are available by prior arrangement.

Entry is free but donations are encouraged.

== See also ==
- List of aerospace museums
