= Charles Napier Kennedy =

British artist (1852–1898)

Charles Napier Kennedy ARHA ROI
- Born: 1852; London, England
- Died: 1898 (aged 45–46); St Ives, Cornwall, England
- Occupation: Artist
- Spouse: Lucy Marwood
- Relatives: Charles Kennedy (grandson)

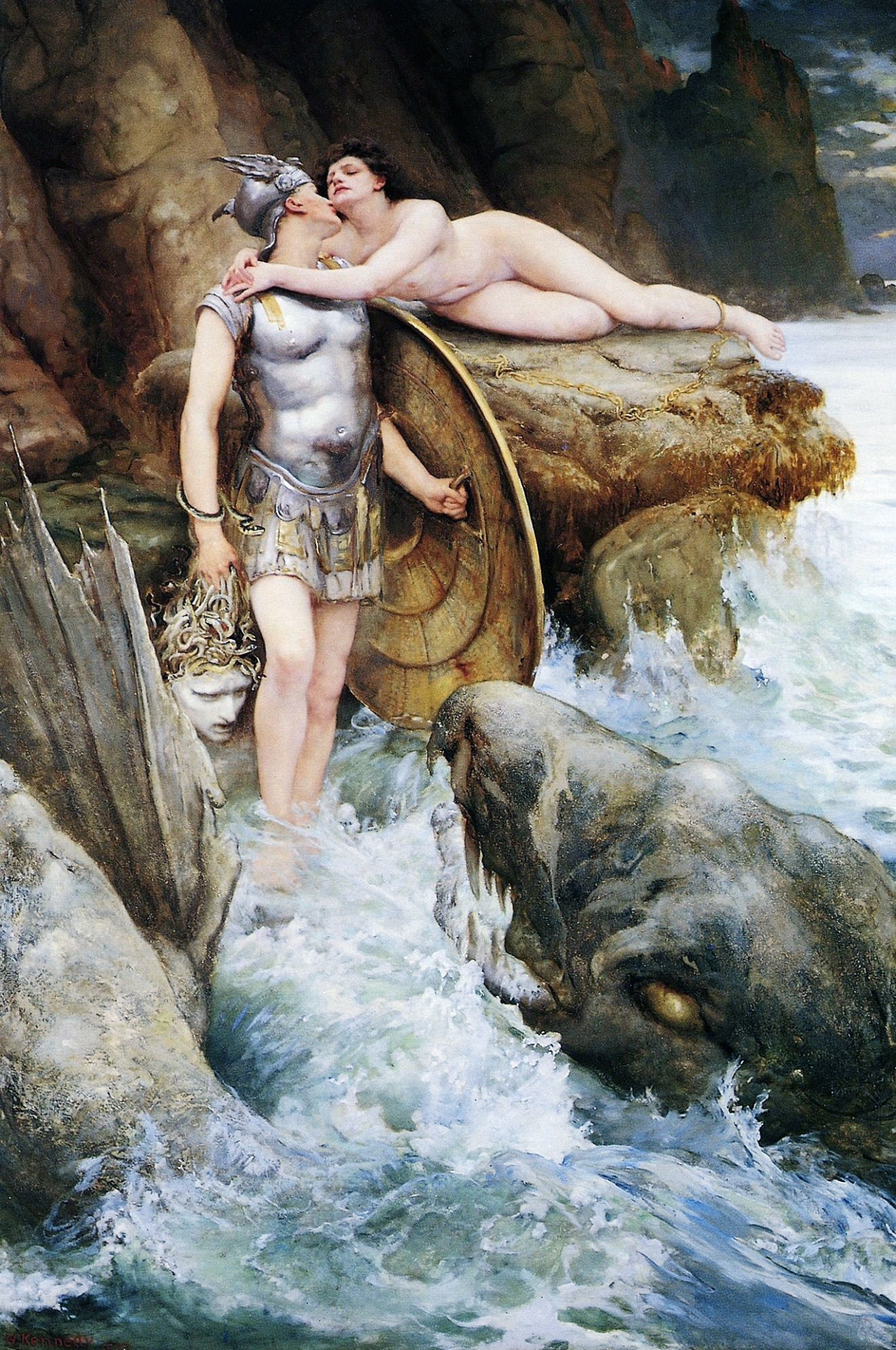
Perseus and Andromeda, 1890

Charles Napier Kennedy ARHA, ROI (1852 in London – 1898 in St Ives) was a British artist. He studied at the Slade School and was renowned for his mythological paintings.

He was elected a member (ROI) of the Royal Institute of Oil Painters in 1883, and was elected an Associate member (ARHA) of the Royal Hibernian Academy in 1896.

His wife Lucy (née Marwood) was also an artist. Kennedy died in St Ives, Cornwall, in 1898, at the age of 46.
