= List of state leaders in the 5th century BC =

State leaders in the 6th century BC – State leaders in the 4th century BC – State leaders by year

This is a list of state leaders in the 5th century BC (500–401 BC).

== Africa: North ==
Carthage

- Carthage: Magonids (complete list) –

- Hamilcar I, King (c.510–480 BC)
- Hanno II, King (480–440 BC)
- Himilco I, King ((in Sicily) 460–410 BC)
- Hannibal I, King (440–406 BC)
- Himilco II, King (406–396 BC)

Cyrene

- Cyrene (complete list) –

- Battus IV, King (515–465 BC)
- Arcesilaus IV, King (465–440 BC)

Egypt: Late Period

- Twenty-eighth Dynasty of the Late Period (complete list) –

- Amyrtaeus, Pharaoh (404–398 BC)

Kush

- Kush (complete list) –

- Amaniastabarqa, King (510–487 BC)
- Siaspiqa, King (487–468 BC))
- Nasakhma, King (468–463 BC)
- Malewiebamani, King (463–435 BC)
- Talakhamani, King (435–431 BC)
- Amanineteyerike, King (431–405 BC)
- Baskakeren, King (405–404 BC)
- Harsiotef, King (404–369 BC)

== Asia ==
=== Asia: East ===
China: Spring and Autumn period (771–c.453 BC)

- Zhou, China: Eastern Zhou (complete list) –

- Jìng, King (519–477 BC)
- Yuan, King (476–469 BC)
- Zhending, King (468–441 BC)

- Cai (complete list) –

- Zhao, Marquis (518–491 BC)
- Cheng, Marquis (490–472 BC)
- Sheng, Marquis (471–457 BC)
- Yuan, Marquis (456–451 BC)
- Qi, Marquis (450–447 BC)

- Cao (complete list) –

- Cao Bo Yang, ruler (501–487 BC)

- Chen (complete list) –

- Hui, Duke (6th–5th century BC)
- Huai, Duke (c.5th century BC)
- Min, Duke (5th century BC)

- Chu (complete list) –

- Zhao, King (515–489 BC)
- Hui, King (488–432 BC)
- Jian, King (431–408 BC)

- Jin (complete list) –

- Ding, Duke (511–475 BC)
- Chu, Duke (474–452 BC)
- Jing, Duke (451–434 BC)
- You, Duke (433–416 BC)
- Lie, Duke (415–389 BC)

- Lu (complete list) –

- Ding, Duke (509–495 BC)
- Ai, Duke (494–467 BC)
- Dao, Duke (466–429 BC)
- Yuan, Duke (428–408 BC)
- Mu, Duke (407–377 BC)

- Qi: House of Jiang (complete list) –

- Jing, Duke (547–490 BC)
- An Ruzi, ruler (489 BC)
- Dao, Duke (488–485 BC)
- Jian, Duke (484–481 BC)
- Ping, Duke (480–456 BC)
- Xuan, Duke (455–405 BC)

- Qin (complete list) –

- Hui I, Duke (500–492 BC)
- Dao, Duke (491–477 BC)
- Ligong, Duke (476–443 BC)

- Song (complete list) –

- Jing, Duke (516–451 BC)
- Zhao, Duke (450–404 BC)
- Dao, Duke (403–396 BC)

- Wey (complete list) –

- Ling, Duke (534–493 BC)
- Chu, Duke (492–481 BC)
- Zhuang, Duke (480–478 BC)

- Wu (complete list) –

- Helü, King (515–496 BC)
- Fuchai, King (495–473 BC)

- Yue (complete list) –

- Yunchang of Yue, King (?─497 BC)
- Goujian of Yue, King (496─465 BC)
- Luying of Yue, King (465─459 BC)
- Bushou of Yue, King (459─449 BC)
- Weng of Yue, King (449─412 BC)
- Yi of Yue, King (412─376 BC)

- Zheng (complete list) –

- Sheng, Duke (500–463 BC)
- Ai, Duke (462–455 BC)
- Gong, Duke (455–424 BC)
- You, Duke (423 BC)
- Xu, Duke (422–396 BC)

China: Warring States period (c.453–221 BC)

- Zhou, China: Eastern Zhou (complete list) –

- Zhending, King (468–441 BC)
- Ai, King (441 BC)
- Si, King (441 BC)
- Kao, King (440–426 BC)
- Weilie, King (425–402 BC)
- An, King (401–376 BC)

- Chu (complete list) –

- Jian, King (431–408 BC)
- Sheng, King (407–402 BC)
- Dao, King (401–381 BC)

- Han (complete list) –

- Wuzi, ruler (424–409 BC)
- Jing, Marquess (408–400 BC)

- Qi: House of Jiang (complete list) –

- Xuan, Duke (455–405 BC)
- Kang, Duke (404–386 BC)

- Qi: House of Tian (complete list) –

- Tai, Duke (404–384 BC)

- Qin (complete list) –

- Ligong, Duke (476–443 BC)
- Zao, Duke (442–429 BC)
- Huai, Duke (428–425 BC)
- Ling, Duke (424–415 BC)
- Jian, Duke (414–400 BC)

- Wei (complete list) –

- Wen, Marquess (445–396 BC)

- Zhao (complete list) –

- Xian, Marquess (424–409 BC)
- Lie, Marquess (409–387 BC)

=== Asia: Southeast ===
Vietnam

- Hồng Bàng dynasty (complete list) –

- Nhâm line, King (c.568–408 BC)
- Hùng Duệ Vương, King (408–258 BC)

=== Asia: South ===
India

- Magadha: Haryanka dynasty (complete list) –

- Bimbisara (c.544–c.492 BC)
- Ajatashatru (c.492–c.460 BCE)
- Udayin, King (c.460–c.440 BC)
- Anuruddha, King (c.440 BC–?)
- Munda, King (?–c.437 BC)
- Nāgadāsaka, King (c.437–c.413 BC)

- Magadha: Shishunaga dynasty (complete list) –

- Shishunaga, King (413–395 BC)

Sri Lanka

#	Name	Period	Era	House	Reign		Duration
#	Name	Period	Era	House	From	To	(years, months, days)
2	Panduvasdeva	Pre Anuradhapura	Tambapanni (complete list)	Vijaya	504 BC	474 BC	30 Years
3	Abhaya	Pre Anuradhapura	Tambapanni (complete list)	Vijaya	474 BC	454 BC	20 Years
-	Tissa	Pre Anuradhapura	Tambapanni (complete list)	Vijaya	454 BC	437 BC	17 Years
4	Pandukabhaya	Anuradhapura	Anuradhapura (complete list)	Vijaya	437 BC	367 BC	60 Years

=== Asia: West ===
- Bosporan Kingdom:Spartocids dynasty (complete list) –

- Spartocus I, King (438–433 BC)
- Satyrus I, King (433–389 BC)
- Seleucus, King (433–393 BC)

- First Persian Empire: Achaemenid Empire(complete list) –

- Darius I, King of Kings (522–486 BC)
- Xerxes I, King of Kings (485–465 BC)
- Artaxerxes I, King of Kings (464–424 BC)
- Xerxes II, Great King, Shah (424 BC)
- Sogdianus, Great King, Shah (424–423 BC)
- Darius II, Great King, Shah (423–404 BC)
- Artaxerxes II, Great King, Shah (404–358 BC)

== Europe ==
=== Europe: Balkans ===
- Athens (complete list) –

- Hermocreon, Archon (501–500 BC)
- Smyrus (?), Archon (500–499 BC)
- Archias, Archon (497–496 BC)
- Hipparchus, Archon (496–495 BC)
- Philippus, Archon (495–494 BC)
- Pythocritus, Archon (494–493 BC)
- Themistocles, Archon (493–492 BC)
- Diognetus, Archon (492–491 BC)
- Hybrilides, Archon (491–490 BC)
- Phaenippus, Archon (490–489 BC)
- Aristides the Just, Archon (489–488 BC)
- Anchises, Archon (488–487 BC)
- Telesinus, Archon (487–486 BC)
- Philocrates, Archon (485–484 BC)
- Leostratus, Archon (484–483 BC)
- Nicodemus, Archon (483–482 BC)
- Hypsichides, Archon (481–480 BC)
- Calliades, Archon (480–479 BC)
- Xanthippus, Archon (479–478 BC)
- Timosthenes, Archon (478–477 BC)
- Adimantus, Archon (477–476 BC)
- Phaedon, Archon (476–475 BC)
- Dromoclides, Archon (475–474 BC)
- Acestorides, Archon (474–473 BC)
- Menon, Archon (473–472 BC)
- Chares, Archon (472–471 BC)
- Praxiergus, Archon (471–470 BC)
- Demotion, Archon (470–469 BC)
- Apsephion, Archon (469–468 BC)
- Theagenides, Archon (468–467 BC)

- Lysistratus, Archon (467–466 BC)
- Lysanias, Archon (466–465 BC)
- Lysitheus, Archon (465–464 BC)
- Archedemides, Archon (464–463 BC)
- Tlepolemus, Archon (463–462 BC)
- Conon, Archon (462–461 BC)
- Euthippus, Archon (461–460 BC)
- Phrasicles, Archon (460–459 BC)
- Philocles, Archon (459–458 BC)
- Habron, Archon (458–457 BC)
- Mnesitheides, Archon (457–456 BC)
- Callias, Archon (456–455 BC)
- Sosistratus, Archon (455–454 BC)
- Ariston, Archon (454–453 BC)
- Lysicrates, Archon (453–452 BC)
- Chaerephanes, Archon (452–451 BC)
- Antidotus, Archon (451–450 BC)
- Euthydemus, Archon (450–449 BC)
- Pedieus, Archon (449–448 BC)
- Philiscus, Archon (448–447 BC)
- Timarchides, Archon (447–446 BC)
- Callimachus, Archon (446–445 BC)
- Lysimachides, Archon (445–444 BC)
- Praxiteles, Archon (444–443 BC)
- Lysanias, Archon (443–442 BC)
- Diphilus, Archon (442–441 BC)
- Timocles, Archon (441–440 BC)
- Morychides, Archon (440–439 BC)
- Glaukinos, Archon (439–438 BC)
- Theodorus, Archon (438–437 BC)
- Euthymenes, Archon (437–436 BC)
- Lysimachus, Archon (436–435 BC)
- Antiochides, Archon (435–434 BC)

- Krates, Archon (434–433 BC)
- Apseudes, Archon (433–432 BC)
- Pythodorus, Archon (432–431 BC)
- Euthydemus, Archon (431–430 BC)
- Apollodorus, Archon (430–429 BC)
- Epameinon, Archon (429–428 BC)
- Diotimus, Archon (428–427 BC)
- Eukles, Archon (427–426 BC)
- Euthynos, Archon (426–425 BC)
- Stratocles, Archon (425–424 BC)
- Isarchus, Archon (424–423 BC)
- Amynias, Archon (423–422 BC)
- Alcaeus, Archon (422–421 BC)
- Aristion, Archon (421–420 BC)
- Astyphilus, Archon (420–419 BC)
- Archias, Archon (419–418 BC)
- Antiphon, Archon (418–417 BC)
- Euphemus, Archon (417–416 BC)
- Arimnestus, Archon (416–415 BC)
- Charias, Archon (415–414 BC)
- Tisandrus, Archon (414–413 BC)
- Cleocritus, Archon (413–412 BC)
- Callias Scambonides, Archon (412–411 BC)
- Mnasilochus (died); Theopompus, Archon (411–410 BC)
- Glaucippus, Archon (410–409 BC)
- Diocles, Archon (409–408 BC)
- Euctemon, Archon (408–407 BC)
- Antigenes, Archon (407–406 BC)
- Callias Angelides, Archon (406–405 BC)
- Alexias, Archon (405–404 BC)
- Pythodorus, Archon (404–403 BC)
- Eucleides, Archon (403–402 BC)
- Mikon, Archon (402–401 BC)
- Xenainetos, Archon (401–400 BC)

- Dacia (complete list) –

- Charnabon, King (5th century BC)

- Illyrian Kingdoms (complete list)

- Grabos I, King of Grabei
- Sirras, maybe a son of Grabos, a prince, royal member and perhaps prince-regent of Lynkestis (Lyncestis) in Upper Macedonia for his father-in-law King Arrhabaeus (c. 423–393 BC)

- Epirus (complete list)

- Admetus, King (before 470–430 BC)
- Tharrhypas, King (430–392 BC)

- Macedonia: Argead dynasty (complete list) –

- Amyntas I, King (547–498 BC)
- Alexander I, King (498–454 BC)
- Alcetas II, King (454–448 BC)
- Perdiccas II, King (448–413 BC)
- Archelaus I, King (413–399 BC)

- Odrysian kingdom of Thrace (complete list) –

- Teres I, King (460–445 BC)
- Sparatocos, King (450–431 BC)
- Sitalces, King (431–424 BC)
- Seuthes I, King (424–410 BC)
- Amadocus I, King (408–389 BC)
- Seuthes II, King (405–387 BC)

- Sparta (complete list) –

- Ariston, King (c.550–515 BC)
- Demaratus, King (c.515–491 BC)
- Leotychidas, King (c.491–469 BC)
- Archidamus II, King (c.469–427 BC)
- Agis II, King (c.427–401/400 BC)
- Agesilaus II, King (c.401/400–360 BC)

=== Europe: South ===
- Roman Republic (complete list) –

- 500

- Ser. Sulpicius Camerinus Cornutus, Consul
- M' Tullius Longus, Consul

- 499

- T. Aebutius Elva, Consul
- P. (or C.) Veturius Geminus Cicurinus, Consul

- 498

- Q. Cloelius Siculus, Consul
- T. Lartius Flavus (or Rufus) II, Consul

- 497

- A. Sempronius Atratinus, Consul
- M. Minucius Augurinus, Consul

- 496

- A. Postumius Albus Regillensis, Consul
- T. Verginius Tricostus Caeliomontanus, Consul

- 495

- Ap. Claudius Sabinus Regillensis, Consul
- P. Servilius Priscus Structus, Consul

- 494

- A. Verginius Tricostus Caeliomontanus, Consul
- T. Veturius Geminus Cicurinus, Consul

- Manius Valerius Maximus, Dictator (494 BC)
- 493

- Post. Cominius Auruncus II, Consul
- Sp. Cassius Vecellinus, Consul

- 492

- T. Geganius Macerinus, Consul
- P. Minucius Augurinus, Consul

- 491

- M. Minucius Augurinus, Consul
- A. Sempronius Atratinus, Consul

- 490

- Q. Sulpicius Camerinus Cornutus, Consul
- Sp. Larcius Rufus (or Flavus) II, Consul

- 489

- C. Julius Iulus, Consul
- P. Pinarius Mamercinus Rufus, Consul

- 488

- Sp. Nautius Rutilus, Consul
- Sex. Furius, Consul

- 487

- T. Sicinius (Sabinus?), Consul
- C. Aquillius, Consul

- 486

- Sp. Cassius Vecellinus, Consul
- Proculus Verginius Tricostus Rutilus, Consul

- 485

- Ser. Cornelius Maluginensis, Consul
- Q. Fabius Vibulanus, Consul

- 484

- L. Aemilius Mamercus, Consul
- K. Fabius Vibulanus, Consul

- 483

- M. Fabius Vibulanus, Consul
- L. Valerius Potitus, Consul

- 482

- Q. Fabius Vibulanus, Consul
- C. Julius Iullus, Consul

- 481

- K. Fabius Vibulanus, Consul
- Sp. Furius Fusus, Consul

- 480

- M. Fabius Vibulanus, Consul
- Cn. Manlius Cincinnatus, Consul

- 479

- K. Fabius Vibulanus, Consul
- T. Verginius Tricostus Rutilus, Consul

- 478

- L. Aemilius Mamercus, Consul
- C. Servilius Structus Ahala, Consul
- Opet. Verginius Tricostus Esquilinus, Consul suffectus

- 477

- C. (or M.) Horatius Pulvillus, Consul
- T. Menenius Lanatus, Consul

- 476

- A. Verginius Tricostus Rutilus, Consul
- Sp. (or P.) Servilius Structus, Consul

- 475

- P. Valerius Poplicola, Consul
- C. Nautius Rutilus, Consul

- 474

- L. Furius Medullinus, Consul
- A. (or Cn.) Manlius Vulso, Consul

- 473

- L. Aemilius Mamercus, Consul
- Vop. Julius Iulus, Consul

- 472

- L. Pinarius Mamercinus Rufus, Consul
- P. Furius Medullinus Fusus, Consul

- 471

- Ap. Claudius Sabinus, Consul
- T. Quinctius Capitolinus Barbatus, Consul

- 470

- L. Valerius Potitus, Consul
- Ti. Aemilius Mamercus, Consul

- 469

- T. Numicius Priscus, Consul
- A. Verginius Caeliomontanus, Consul

- 468

- T. Quinctius Capitolinus Barbatus, Consul
- Q. Servilius Structus Priscus, Consul

- 467

- Ti. Aemilius Mamercus, Consul
- Q. Fabius Vibulanus, Consul

- 466

- Q. Servilius (Structus) Priscus, Consul
- Sp. Postumius Albinus Regillensis, Consul

- 465

- Q. Fabius Vibulanus, Consul
- T. Quinctius Capitolinus Barbatus, Consul

- 464

- A. Postumius Albinus Regillensis, Consul
- Sp. Furius Medullinus Fusus, Consul

- 463

- P. Servilius Priscus, Consul
- L. Aebutius Helva, Consul

- 462

- L. Lucretius Tricipitinus, Consul
- T. Veturius Geminus Cicurinus, Consul

- 461

- P. Volumnius Amintinus Gallus, Consul
- Ser. (or P.) Sulpicius Camerinus Cornutus, Consul

- 460

- P. Valerius Poplicola, Consul
- C. Claudius Sabinus Regillensis, Consul
- L. Quinctius Cincinnatus, Consul suffectus

- 459

- Q. Fabius Vibulanus, Consul
- L. Cornelius Maluginensis Uritinus, Consul

- 458

- C. Nautius Rutilus, Consul
- L. Minucius Esquilinus Augurinus, Consul

- L. Quinctius Cincinnatus, Dictator (458 BC)
- 457

- C. Horatius Pulvillus or: L. Quinctius Cincinnatus, Consul
- Q. Minucius Esquilinus Augurinus or: M. Fabius Vibulanus, Consul

- 456

- M. Valerius Maximus Lactuca, Consul
- Sp. Verginius Tricostus Caeliomontanus, Consul

- 455

- T. Romilius Rocus Vaticanus, Consul
- C. Veturius Cicurinus, Consul

- 454

- Sp. Tarpeius Montanus Capitolinus, Consul
- A. Aternius Varus Fontinalis, Consul

- 453

- Sex. Quinctilius, Consul
- P. Curiatius Fistus Trigeminus, Consul
- Sp. Furius Medullinus Fusus, Consul suffectus

- 452

- T. Menenius Lanatus, Consul
- P. Sestius Capitolinus Vaticanus, Consul

- 451

- Ap. Claudius Crassus Inregillensis Sabinus, Consul
- T. Genucius Augurinus, Consul
- Decemviri: Ap. Claudius Crassus Inregillensis Sabinus, A. Manlius Vulso, T. Genucius Augurinus, P. or Ser. Sulpicius Camerinus Cornutus, T. or Sp. or L. Veturius Crassus Cicurinus, P. Curiatius Fistus Trigeminus, P. Sestius Capito Vaticanus, T. Romilius Rocus Vaticanus, C. Julius Iulus, Sp. Postumius Albus Regillensis

- 450 – Decemviri: Ap. Claudius Crassus Inregillensis Sabinus, Q. Poetelius Libo Visolus, M. Cornelius Maluginensis, T. Antonius Merenda, M. Sergius Esquilinus, K. Duillius, L. Minucius Esquilinus Augurinus, Sp. Oppius Cornicen, Q. Fabius Vibulanus, M' Rabuleius
- 449 – Decemviri: Ap. Claudius Crassus Sabinus Regillensis, Q. Poetelius Libo Visolus, M. Cornelius Maluginensis, T. Antonius Merenda, M. Sergius Esquilinus, K. Duillius, L. Minucius Esquilinus Augurinus, Sp. Oppius Cornicen, Q. Fabius Vibulanus, M' Rabuleius, L. Valerius Potitus, M. Horatius (Tu?)rrinus Barbatus
- 448

- Lars (or Sp.) Herminius Coritinesanus, Consul
- T. Verginius Tricostus Caeliomontanus, Consul

- 447

- M. Geganius Macerinus, Consul
- C. Julius Iulus, Consul

- 446

- T. Quinctius Capitolinus Barbatus, Consul
- Agrippa Furius Fusus, Consul

- 445

- M. Genucius Augurinus, Consul
- C. (or Agrippa) Curtius Philo, Consul

- 444 – Consular Tribunes: A. Sempronius Atratinus, T. Cloelius Siculus, L. Atilius Luscus, L. Papirius Mugillanus, L. Sempronius Atratinus
- 443

- M. Geganius Macerinus, Consul
- T. Quinctius Capitolinus Barbatus, Consul

- 442

- M. Fabius Vibulanus, Consul
- Post. Aebutius Helva Cornicen, Consul

- 441

- C. Furius Pacilus Fusus, Consul
- M. (or M') Papirius Crassus, Consul

- 440

- Proc. Geganius Macerinus, Consul
- L. Menenius Lanatus or: T. Menenius Lanatus, Consul

- 439

- Agrippa Menenius Lanatus, Consul
- T. Quinctius Capitolinus Barbatus, Consul

- Lucius Quinctius Cincinnatus, Dictator (439 BC)
- 438 – Consular Tribunes: Mam. Aemilius Macerinus, L. Julius Iulus, L. Quinctius Cincinnatus

- 437

- M. Geganius Macerinus, Consul
- L. Sergius Fidenas, Consul
- M. Valerius Lactuca Maximus, Consul suffectus

- 436

- L. Papirius Crassus, Consul
- M. Cornelius Maluginensis, Consul

- 435

- C. Julius Iulus), Consul
- L. (or Proc.) Verginius Tricostus, Consul

- 434

- C. Julius Iulus or: M. Manlius Capitolinus, Consul
- L. (or Proc.) Verginius Tricostus or Q. Sulpicius Camerinus Praetextatus, Consul – Consular Tribunes: Ser. Cornelius Cossus, Q. Sulpicius Camerinus Praetextatus, M. Manlius Capitolinus

- 433 – Consular Tribunes: M. Fabius Vibulanus, L. Sergius Fidenas, M. Folius Flaccinator
- 432 – Consular Tribunes: L. Pinarius Mamercus, Sp. Postumius Albus Regillensis, L. Furius Medullinus
- 431

- T. Quinctius Pennus Cincinnatus, Consul
- C. (or Cn.) Iulius Mento, Consul

- 430

- C. (or L.) Papirius Crassus, Consul
- L. Julius Iulus, Consul

- 429

- Hostus Lucretius Tricipitinus, Consul
- L. Sergius Fidenas, Consul

- 428

- A. Cornelius Cossus or L. Quinctius Cincinnatus, Consul
- T. Quinctius Pennus Cincinnatus or A. Sempronius Atratinus, Consul

- 427

- C. Servilius Ahala, Consul
- L. Papirius Mugillanus, Consul

- 426 – Consular Tribunes: T. Quinctius Pennus Cincinnatus, M. Postumius ---, C. Furius Pacilus Fusus, A. Cornelius Cossus
- 425 – Consular Tribunes: A. Sempronius Atratinus, L. Furius Medullinus, L. Quinctius Cincinnatus, L. Horatius Barbatus
- 424 – Consular Tribunes: Ap. Claudius Crassus, L. Sergius Fidenas, Sp. Nautius Rutilus, Sex. Julius Iulus
- 423

- C. Sempronius Atratinus, Consul
- Q. Fabius Vibulanus Ambustus, Consul

- 422 – Consular Tribunes: L. Manlius Capitolinus, L. Papirius Mugillanus, Q. Antonius Merenda
- 421

- N. (or Cn.) Fabius Vibulanus, Consul
- T. Quinctius Capitolinus Barbatus, Consul

- 420 – Consular Tribunes: L. Quinctius Cincinnatus
  or: T. Quinctius Pennus Cincinnatus, M. Manlius Vulso, L. Furius Medullinus, A. Sempronius Atratinus
- 419 – Consular Tribunes: Agrippa Menenius Lanatus, Sp. Nautius Rutilus, P. Lucretius Tricipitinus, C. Servilius Axilla
- 418 – Consular Tribunes: L. Sergius Fidenas, C. Servilius Axilla, M. Papirius Mugillanus
- 417 – Consular Tribunes: P. Lucretius Tricipitinus, Agrippa Menenius Lanatus, Sp. Rutilius Crassus or: Sp. Veturius Crassus Cicurinus, C. Servilius Axilla
- 416 – Consular Tribunes: A. Sempronius Atratinus, Q. Fabius Vibulanus Ambustus, M. Papirius Mugillanus, Sp. Nautius Rutilus
- 415 – Consular Tribunes: P. Cornelius Cossus, N. Fabius Vibulanus, C. Valerius Potitus Volusus, Q. Quinctius Cincinnatus
- 414 – Consular Tribunes: Cn. Cornelius Cossus, Q. Fabius Vibulanus Ambustus, L. Valerius Potitus, P. Postumius Albinus Regillensis
- 413

- A. Cornelius Cossus, Consul
- L. Furius Medullinus, Consul

- 412

- Q. Fabius Vibulanus Ambustus, Consul
- C. Furius Pacilus, Consul

- 411

- M. Papirius Mugillanus (or Atratinus?), Consul
- Sp. Nautius Rutilus, Consul

- 410

- M' Aemilius Mamercinus, Consul
- C. Valerius Potitus Volusus, Consul

- 409

- Cn. Cornelius Cossus, Consul
- L. Furius Medullinus, Consul

- 408 – Consular Tribunes: C. Julius Iulus, C. Servilius Ahala, P. Cornelius Cossus
- 407 – Consular Tribunes: L. Furius Medullinus, N. Fabius Vibulanus, C. Valerius Potitus Volusus, C. Servilius Ahala
- 406 – Consular Tribunes: P. Cornelius Rutilus Cossus, N. Fabius Ambustus, Cn. Cornelius Cossus, L. Valerius Potitus
- 405 – Consular Tribunes: T. Quinctius Capitolinus Barbatus, A. Manlius Vulso Capitolinus, Q. Quinctius Cincinnatus, L. Furius Medullinus, C. Julius Iulus, M' Aemilius Mamercinus
- 404 – Consular Tribunes: C. Valerius Potitus Volusus, Cn. Cornelius Cossus, M' Sergius Fidenas, K. Fabius Ambustus, P. Cornelius Maluginensis, Sp. Nautius Rutilus
- 403 – Consular Tribunes: M' Aemilius Mamercinus, M. Quinctilius Varus, L. Valerius Potitus, L. Julius Iulus, Ap. Claudius Crassus, M. Furius Fusus
- 402 – Consular Tribunes: C. Servilius Ahala, Q. Sulpicius Camerinus Cornutus, Q. Servilius Fidenas, A. Manlius Vulso Capitolinus, L. Verginius Tricostus Esquilinus, M' Sergius Fidenas
- 401 – Consular Tribunes: L. Valerius Potitus, Cn. Cornelius Cossus, M. Furius Camillus, K. Fabius Ambustus, M' Aemilius Mamercinus, L. Julius Iulus

- Syracuse (complete list) –

- Gelo, Tyrant (485–478 BC)
- Hiero I, Tyrant (478–466 BC)
- Thrasybulus, Tyrant (466–465 BC)
- Dionysius the Elder, Tyrant (405–367 BC)

=== Eurasia: Caucasus ===
- Kingdom of Armenia (complete list) –

- Hidarnes II, King (early 5th century BC)
- Hidarnes III, King (mid 5th century BC)
- Artasyrus, King (5th century BC)
- Orontes I, Satrap (401–344 BC)
