= 480s BC =

Decade

This article concerns the period 489 BC – 480 BC.

== Events ==
=== 489 BC ===
==== By place ====
====== Greece ======
- After his great victory in the Battle of Marathon, Miltiades leads a naval expedition to Paros to pay off a private score. However, the expedition is unsuccessful and, on his return, he is fined in a prosecution led by Xanthippus and put in prison where he dies of wounds received at Paros.
- The Athenian soldier and statesman, Aristides (the Just), is made chief archon of Athens.

=== 488 BC ===
==== By place ====
====== Sicily ======
- Theron becomes tyrant of Acragas in Sicily.

====== Rome ======
- Gaius Marcius Coriolanus and Attius Tullus Aufidius, leading an army of the Volsci, besiege Rome. Coriolanus' mother and wife convince him to break off the siege. In recognition of the service of these women, a temple is erected in Rome dedicated to Fortuna. Subsequently, the Volsci and their allies the Aequi have a falling out, and their armies fight as a result, significantly diminishing the strength of each of them.

====== Greece ======
- Astylos of Croton wins the stadion race at the 73rd Olympic Games.

=== 487 BC ===
==== By place ====
====== Greece ======
- The island of Aegina and the city of Athens go to war. The island has earned the enmity of Athens by earlier submitting to the Persians. The Spartan King, Leotychidas, tries unsuccessfully to arrange a truce in the war.
- The Athenian Archonship becomes elective by lot from all the citizens, an important milestone in the move towards radical Athenian democracy. There are nine archons and a secretary. Three of the archons have special functions: the basileus, or sovereign; the polemarch (originally a military commander); and the archon eponymous (chief magistrate), who gave his name to the year.
- First known use of ostracism, an instrument created in 508 by Cleisthenes which enabled the electorate to banish for ten years any citizen deemed to be a threat to democracy. It was intended, therefore, as a safeguard against tyranny. An ostracism could be held annually providing a quorum of 6,000 was achieved but, apparently, the Assembly declined to invoke it until 487 when there was a popular reaction against Hipparchos the Pisistradid who had been the peace party archon in 496. He was the first of several citizens to be ostracised through the fifth century.

====== Rome ======
- Wars are fought between Rome and each of the Volsci and the Hernici. Rome prevails in both disputes.

====== Kush ======
- Siaspiqa becomes ruler of the Kushite kingdom of Meroe, likely succeeding Amaniastabarqa.

=== 486 BC ===
==== By place ====
====== Persian Empire ======
- Egypt revolts against Persian rule upon the death of king Darius I. The revolts, probably led by Libyans of the western Delta, are crushed the next year by Xerxes, who reduces Egypt to the status of a conquered province.

====== Roman Republic ======
- Rome enters into a new treaty with the Hernici.
- During his third consulate, the Roman consul Spurius Cassius Vecellinus proposes an agrarian law to assist needy plebeians. The proposal is vehemently opposed by the patricians including the other consul Proculus Verginius Tricostus Rutilus, and the plebs turn against the patricians. In the following year Cassius is condemned and executed for high treason.

====== China ======
- The first part of the Grand Canal of China is built during the reign of King Fuchai of Wu. It links the Yangtze River with the Huai River, and is a measure to ship ample amount of supplies north for intended wars with the northern states of Song and Lu.

==== By topic ====
====== Art ======
- The construction of a relief in the Apadana, a ceremonial complex at Persepolis, is finished. It shows Darius and Xerxes receiving tribute.

=== 485 BC ===
==== By place ====
====== Persian Empire ======
- Xerxes I is just beginning his reign after the death of his father Darius the Great in 486 BC. During this time the Persian empire extends as far west as Macedonia and Libya and as far east as the Hyphasis (Beas) River; it stretches to the Caucasus Mountains and the Aral Sea in the north and to the Persian Gulf and the Arabian Desert in the south.

====== Sicily ======
- Gelo, the tyrant of Gela, takes advantage of an appeal by the descendants of the first colonist of Syracuse, the Gamoroi, who had held power until they were expelled by the Killichiroi, the lower class of the city. He makes himself master of that city, leaving his brother Hieron to control Gela.

=== 484 BC ===
==== By place ====
====== Persian Empire ======
- Xerxes I quells the Egyptian revolt against Persian rule. He ravages the Delta region in the process and then appoints his brother Achaemenes satrap (governor) of Egypt.
- Despite an attempt at rebellion, the land and city of Babylon remains solidly under Persian rule.

====== Greece ======
- The Athenian general and statesman, Xanthippus, is ostracised.
- Astylos of Croton wins the stadion race for a second time at the 74th Olympic Games.

====== Rome ======
- The Romans defeat the Volsci and Aequi in battle.
- Dedication of the Temple of Castor and Pollux

====== Literature ======
- The Athenian playwright, Aeschylus, wins first prize in drama at the Dionysia festival.

=== 483 BC ===
==== By place ====
====== Persian empire ======
- Xerxes I of Persia is encouraged by his cousin and brother-in-law, Mardonius, supported by a strong party of exiled Greeks, to take revenge for the defeat that Darius I suffered at the hands of the Greeks at Marathon in 490 BC. In response, Xerxes prepares for a major expedition to crush the Greeks. To avoid a repeat of the significant losses to the Persian fleet that occurred in 492 BC, Xerxes has a canal cut through the promontory of Mount Athos.

====== Greece ======
- The Athenian archon Themistocles realises that the Greeks need to be able to beat the Persians at sea. To carry out this strategy, however, Athens needs far more warships (that is to say the newly developed, specialised triremes) than the 70 it has. Themistocles is initially opposed by other Athenian leaders. However, when the state-owned silver mines at Laurium become the site of a rich strike, Themistocles persuades the assembly, instead of "declaring a dividend," to devote the whole surplus to increasing the navy to a proposed 200 ships.

====== India ======
- Following the death of Gautama Buddha, the relics associated with his cremation were divided amongst royal families and his disciples, then interned in 8 reliquaries. Each reliquary was then encased in its own burial mound, called a stupa (approximate date).

====== Sicily ======
- Gelo, the tyrant of Syracuse conquers the nearby Sicilian cities of Euboea and Megara Hyblaea, selling their common people into slavery and bringing their oligarchs to Syracuse.

=== 482 BC ===
==== By place ====
====== Greece ======
- The Athenian archon Themistocles secures the ostracism of his opponents and becomes the political leader of Athens. The Athenian soldier and statesman, Aristides, is one of those ostracised due to his opposition to Themistocles' naval policy.

====== China ======
- While King Fuchai of Wu attends a meeting in Huangchi, in an attempt to gain hegemony over all the other duchies of Zhou dynasty China, his capital city in the State of Wu is captured in a surprise assault by King Goujian of Yue. In 473 BC the State of Wu will be annexed by the State of Yue.

====== Rome ======
- Continuation of hostilities with the Aequi.
- Continuation of hostilities with Veii. The Veientine army enters Roman territory and ravages the countryside.

=== 481 BC ===
==== By place ====
====== Persian Empire ======
- The Persian King Xerxes I arrives at Sardis and begins to build up his great army and navy for the invasion of Greece. Egypt contributes 481 ships.

====== Greece ======
- The Congress at the Isthmus of Corinth, under the presidency of Sparta, brings together a number of the Greek city states, who agree to the end of the war between Athens and Aegina. They also discuss the threat from the Persians. Athens is unwilling to place her forces under Sparta and its king Leonidas. Gelo, tyrant of Syracuse, wants high command, but Sparta and Athens refuse. However, during the Congress, Gelo has to withdraw due to Carthage's plans to invade Sicily. Finally, Themistocles agrees that Athens' navy serve under a Spartan admiral to achieve the unity of the Greek states. Nevertheless, Thebes and Thessaly are unwilling to support Athens against the Persians and Crete decides to remain neutral.

====== China ======
- The Spring and Autumn period, which had begun in 722 BC, ends and compilation of the Spring and Autumn Annals ceases. It gives way to the Warring States period.

====== Rome ======
- The Aequi lay siege to Ortona but are defeated by the Romans. Tensions between the Roman classes flare during the battle.
- Continuation of hostilities with Veii. The Veientine army threatens to besiege Rome but nothing notable occurs.
- The tribune Spurius Licinius unsuccessfully advocates an agrarian law.

=== 480 BC ===
==== By place ====
====== Greece ======
- May – King Xerxes I of Persia marches from Sardis and onto Thrace and Macedonia.
- The Greek congress decides to send a force of 10,000 Greeks, including hoplites and cavalry, to the Vale of Tempe, through which they believe the Persian army will pass. The force includes Lacedaemonians led by Euanetos and Athenians under Themistocles. Warned by Alexander I of Macedon that the vale can be bypassed elsewhere and that the army of Xerxes is overwhelming, the Greeks decide not to try to hold there and vacate the vale.
- August 20 or September 8-10 – The Battle of Thermopylae ends in victory for the Persians under Xerxes. His army engulfs a force of 300 Spartans and 700 Thespiae under the Spartan King, Leonidas I. The Greeks under Leonidas resist the advance through Thermopylae of Xerxes' vast army. For two days Leonidas and his troops withstand the Persian attacks; he then orders most of his troops to retreat, and he and his 300-member royal guard fight to the last man.
- Pausanias becomes regent for King Leonidas' son, Pleistarchus, after Leonidas I is killed at Thermopylae. Pausanias is a member of the Agiad royal family, the son of King Cleombrotus and nephew of Leonidas.
- Phocis and the coasts of Euboea are devastated by the Persians. Thebes and most of Boeotia join Xerxes.
- King Alexander I of Macedon is obliged to accompany Xerxes in a campaign through Greece, though he secretly aids the Greek allies. With Xerxes' apparent acquiescence, Alexander seizes the Greek colony of Pydna and advances his frontiers eastward to the Strymon, taking in Crestonia and Bisaltia, along with the rich silver deposits of Mount Dysorus.
- The Athenian soldier and statesman, Aristides, as well as the former Athenian archon Xanthippus, return from banishment in Aegina to serve under Themistocles against the Persians.
- August – The Persians achieve a naval victory over the Greeks in an engagement fought near Artemisium, a promontory on the north coast of Euboea. The Greek fleet holds its own against the Persians in three days of fighting but withdraws southward when news comes of the defeat at Thermopylae.
- Breaking through the pass at Thermopylae from Macedonia into Greece, the Persians occupy Attica.
- September 21 – The Persians sack Athens, whose citizens flee to Salamis and then Peloponnesus.
- September 22 – The Battle of Salamis brings victory to the Greeks, whose Athenian general Themistocles lures the Persians into the Bay of Salamis, between the Athenian port-city of Piraeus and the island of Salamis. The Greek triremes then attack furiously, ramming or sinking many Persian vessels and boarding others. The Greeks sink about 200 Persian vessels while losing only about 40 of their own. The rest of the Persian fleet is scattered, and as a result Xerxes has to postpone his planned land offensives for a year, a delay that gives the Greek city-states time to unite against him. Aeschylus fights on the winning side.
- An eclipse of the sun discourages the Greek army from following up the victory of Salamis. Xerxes returns to Persia leaving behind an army under Mardonius, which winters in Thessaly.

====== Rome ======
- The Romans achieve a significant victory against Veii after a close-fought battle. Tensions between the Roman classes flare during the battle. Quintus Fabius and the consul Manlius perish in the fighting.
- The tribune Titus Pontificius unsuccessfully advocates an agrarian law.

====== Sicily ======
- Xerxes encourages the Carthaginians to attack the Greeks in Sicily. Under the Carthaginian military leader, Hamilcar, Carthage sends across a large army.
- The Greek city of Himera in Sicily, in its quarrel with Akragas, enlists Carthaginian support. With the help of Gelo, the tyrant of Syracusae, and Theron of Akragas, the Carthaginians are defeated in the Battle of Himera. After the defeat, Hamilcar kills himself.

====== Persian empire ======
- The Imperial treasury at the Persepolis Palace is completed after a building time of thirty years.

==== By topic ====
====== Arts ======
- The archaic period of sculpture ends in Greece and is succeeded by the Severe (Early Classical) period (approximate date).
- A sculpture of the Dying Warrior is made in the left corner of the east pediment of the Temple of Aphaea in Aegina (approximate date). Today, it is preserved at the Staatliche Antikensammlungen und Glyptothek in Munich, Germany.
- The sculpture of the Kritios Boy is made on Acropolis, Athens (approximate date). It is now preserved in the Acropolis Museum in Athens.
- Work begins on the detail Musicians and Dancers on a wall painting in the Tomb of the Lionesses in Tarquinia. It is finished some ten years later.

== Births ==
487 BC

- Gorgias, Greek philosopher (approximate date) (d. c. 376 BC)

485 BC

- Herodotus, Greek historian, is estimated to be born this year.
- Some sources place the birth of Euripides in this year, though the more traditional date is 480.

484 BC

- Herodotus of Halicarnassus, Greek historian (approximate date) (died c. 425 BC)
- Achaeus of Eretria, Greek tragedian

481 BC

- Protagoras, Greek presocratic philosopher (d. c. 420 BC)

480 BC

- September 22 (traditional date) – Euripides, Greek playwright (d. 406 BC)
- Antiphon, Attic orator (d. 411 BC)
- Ezra, Jewish scribe and priest (d. c. 440 BCE)
- Hippodamus of Miletus, Greek architect and urban planner (d. 408 BC)
- Siddhartha Gautama (suggested), wandering ascetic and religious teacher (d. 400 BC)

== Deaths ==
489 BC

- Cleomenes I, king of Sparta (approximate date)
- Miltiades, Athenian general (b. c. 550 BC)

486 BC

- Darius I, king of the Persian Achaemenid Empire (b. 550 BCE)
- Spurius Cassius Vecellinus, Roman consul (executed)

485 BC

- Spurius Cassius Vecellinus, three times Roman consul.

484 BC

- Wu Zixu, political advisor from Chu who has been employed at the court of the State of Wu during the reign of King Helü of Wu; all Chinese people with the surname Wu consider him their first ancestor (born 526 BC)
- Makkhali Gosala (according to historian Arthur Llewellyn Basham), Indian ascetic

483 BC

- Gautama Buddha, Indian prince, founder of Buddhism (b. c. 563 BC)

481 BC

- Sima Niu, the highest ranking aristocrat among the disciples of Confucius

480 BC

- August 11 – Leonidas I, Agiad King of Sparta (died at Thermopylae)
- Xenophanes, Greek philosopher (b. 570 BC)
- Hamilcar, Carthaginian general (suicide after his defeat in the Battle of Himera)
- Heraclitus, Greek philosopher (approximate year)
- Zhong You (Zilu), a prominent disciple of Confucius (b. 542 BC)
- Quintus Fabius Vibulanus, a former consul (twice) of Rome, dies in battle against Veii.
- Gnaeus Manlius Cincinnatus, Roman consul, dies in battle against Veii.
- Lady Nanzi, Chinese Duchess ruler.
