= Tricostus =

Tricostus is an ancient Roman cognomen. Notable people with the name include:

- Aulus Verginius Tricostus Caeliomontanus (consul 494 BC), Roman politician
- Aulus Verginius Tricostus Caeliomontanus (consul 469 BC), Roman politician
- Aulus Verginius Tricostus Rutilus, Roman consul in 476 BC
- Lucius Verginius Tricostus Esquilinus (fl. 402–401 BC), Roman politician
- Opiter Verginius Tricostus (died 486 BC?), Roman consul in 502 BC
- Opiter Verginius Tricostus Esquilinus, Roman consul in 478 BC
- Proculus Verginius Tricostus, Roman consul in 435 BC and possibly 434 BC
- Proculus Verginius Tricostus Rutilus, Roman consul in 486 BC
- Titus Verginius Tricostus Caeliomontanus (consul 496 BC), Roman consul
- Titus Verginius Tricostus Caeliomontanus (consul 448 BC), Roman consul
- Titus Verginius Tricostus Rutilus (died 463 BC), Roman consul
