= 480 BC =

480 BC in various calendars
- Gregorian calendar: 480 BC; CDLXXX BC
- Ab urbe condita: 274
- Ancient Egypt era: XXVII dynasty, 46
- Pharaoh: Xerxes I of Persia, 6
- Ancient Greek Olympiad (summer): 75th Olympiad (victor)¹
- Assyrian calendar: 4271
- Balinese saka calendar: N/A
- Bengali calendar: −1073 – −1072
- Berber calendar: 471
- Buddhist calendar: 65
- Burmese calendar: −1117
- Byzantine calendar: 5029–5030
- Chinese calendar: 庚申年 (Metal Monkey); 2218 or 2011 — to — 辛酉年 (Metal Rooster); 2219 or 2012
- Coptic calendar: −763 – −762
- Discordian calendar: 687
- Ethiopian calendar: −487 – −486
- Hebrew calendar: 3281–3282
- Hindu calendars
- Vikram Samvat: −423 – −422
- Shaka Samvat: N/A
- Kali Yuga: 2621–2622
- Holocene calendar: 9521
- Iranian calendar: 1101 BP – 1100 BP
- Islamic calendar: 1135 BH – 1134 BH
- Javanese calendar: N/A
- Julian calendar: N/A
- Korean calendar: 1854
- Minguo calendar: 2391 before ROC 民前2391年
- Nanakshahi calendar: −1947
- Thai solar calendar: 63–64
- Tibetan calendar: ལྕགས་ཕོ་སྤྲེ་ལོ་ (male Iron-Monkey) −353 or −734 or −1506 — to — ལྕགས་མོ་བྱ་ལོ་ (female Iron-Bird) −352 or −733 or −1505

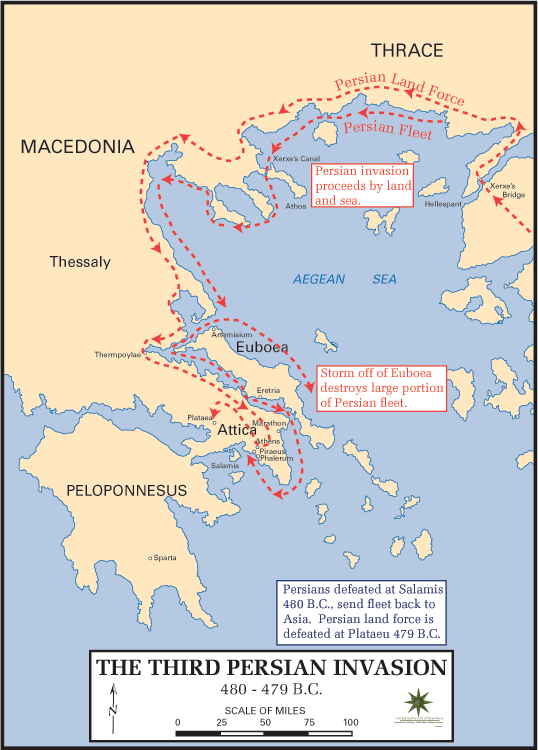
The Persian invasion of Greece in 480–479 BC

Year 480 BC was a year of the pre-Julian Roman calendar. At the time, it was known as the Year of the Consulship of Vibulanus and Cincinnatus (or, less frequently, year 274 Ab urbe condita). The denomination 480 BC for this year has been used since the early medieval period, when the Anno Domini calendar era became the prevalent method in Europe for naming years.

== Events ==
=== By place ===
==== Greece ====
- May – King Xerxes I of Persia marches from Sardis and onto Thrace and Macedonia.
- The Greek congress decides to send a force of 10,000 Greeks, including hoplites and cavalry, to the Vale of Tempe, through which they believe the Persian army will pass. The force includes Lacedaemonians led by Euanetos and Athenians under Themistocles. Warned by Alexander I of Macedon that the vale can be bypassed elsewhere and that the army of Xerxes is overwhelming, the Greeks decide not to try to hold there and vacate the vale.
- August 20 or September 8-10 – The Battle of Thermopylae ends in victory for the Persians under Xerxes. His army engulfs a force of 300 Spartans and 700 Thespiae under the Spartan King, Leonidas I. The Greeks under Leonidas resist the advance through Thermopylae of Xerxes' vast army. For two days Leonidas and his troops withstand the Persian attacks; he then orders most of his troops to retreat, and he and his 300-member royal guard fight to the last man.
- Pausanias becomes regent for King Leonidas' son, Pleistarchus, after Leonidas I is killed at Thermopylae. Pausanias is a member of the Agiad royal family, the son of King Cleombrotus and nephew of Leonidas.
- Phocis and the coasts of Euboea are devastated by the Persians. Thebes and most of Boeotia join Xerxes.
- King Alexander I of Macedon is obliged to accompany Xerxes in a campaign through Greece, though he secretly aids the Greek allies. With Xerxes' apparent acquiescence, Alexander seizes the Greek colony of Pydna and advances his frontiers eastward to the Strymon, taking in Crestonia and Bisaltia, along with the rich silver deposits of Mount Dysorus.
- The Athenian soldier and statesman, Aristides, as well as the former Athenian archon Xanthippus, return from banishment in Aegina to serve under Themistocles against the Persians.
- August – The Persians achieve a naval victory over the Greeks in an engagement fought near Artemisium, a promontory on the north coast of Euboea. The Greek fleet holds its own against the Persians in three days of fighting but withdraws southward when news comes of the defeat at Thermopylae.
- Breaking through the pass at Thermopylae from Macedonia into Greece, the Persians occupy Attica.
- September 21 – The Persians sack Athens, whose citizens flee to Salamis and then Peloponnesus.
- September 22 – The Battle of Salamis brings victory to the Greeks, whose Athenian general Themistocles lures the Persians into the Bay of Salamis, between the Athenian port-city of Piraeus and the island of Salamis. The Greek triremes then attack furiously, ramming or sinking many Persian vessels and boarding others. The Greeks sink about 200 Persian vessels while losing only about 40 of their own. The rest of the Persian fleet is scattered, and as a result Xerxes has to postpone his planned land offensives for a year, a delay that gives the Greek city-states time to unite against him. Aeschylus fights on the winning side.
- An eclipse of the sun discourages the Greek army from following up the victory of Salamis. Xerxes returns to Persia leaving behind an army under Mardonius, which winters in Thessaly.

==== Rome ====
- The Romans achieve a significant victory against Veii after a close-fought battle. Tensions between the Roman classes flare during the battle. Quintus Fabius and the consul Manlius perish in the fighting.
- The tribune Titus Pontificius unsuccessfully advocates an agrarian law.

==== Sicily ====
- Xerxes encourages the Carthaginians to attack the Greeks in Sicily. Under the Carthaginian military leader, Hamilcar, Carthage sends across a large army.
- The Greek city of Himera in Sicily, in its quarrel with Akragas, enlists Carthaginian support. With the help of Gelo, the tyrant of Syracusae, and Theron of Akragas, the Carthaginians are defeated in the Battle of Himera. After the defeat, Hamilcar kills himself.

==== Persian empire ====
- The Imperial treasury at the Persepolis Palace is completed after a building time of thirty years.

=== By topic ===
==== Arts ====
- The archaic period of sculpture ends in Greece and is succeeded by the Severe (Early Classical) period (approximate date).
- A sculpture of the Dying Warrior is made in the left corner of the east pediment of the Temple of Aphaea in Aegina (approximate date). Today, it is preserved at the Staatliche Antikensammlungen und Glyptothek in Munich, Germany.
- The sculpture of the Kritios Boy is dedicated on the Acropolis in Athens (approximate date). It is now preserved in the Acropolis Museum.
- Work begins on the detail Musicians and Dancers on a wall painting in the Tomb of the Lionesses in Tarquinia. It is finished some ten years later.

== Births ==
- September 22 (traditional date) – Euripides, Greek playwright (d. 406 BC)
- Antiphon, Attic orator (d. 411 BC)
- Ezra, Jewish scribe and priest (d. c. 440 BCE)
- Hippodamus of Miletus, Greek architect and urban planner (d. 408 BC)
- Siddhartha Gautama (suggested), wandering ascetic and religious teacher (d. 400 BC)

== Deaths ==
- August 11 – Leonidas I, Agiad King of Sparta (died at Thermopylae)
- Xenophanes, Greek philosopher (b. 570 BC)
- Hamilcar, Carthaginian general (suicide after his defeat in the Battle of Himera)
- Heraclitus, Greek philosopher (approximate year)
- Zhong You (Zilu), a prominent disciple of Confucius (b. 542 BC)
- Quintus Fabius Vibulanus, a former consul (twice) of Rome, dies in battle against Veii.
- Gnaeus Manlius Cincinnatus, Roman consul, dies in battle against Veii.
- Lady Nanzi, Chinese Duchess ruler.
