= 482 BC =

482 BC in various calendars
- Gregorian calendar: 482 BC; CDLXXXII BC
- Ab urbe condita: 272
- Ancient Egypt era: XXVII dynasty, 44
- Pharaoh: Xerxes I of Persia, 4
- Ancient Greek Olympiad (summer): 74th Olympiad, year 3
- Assyrian calendar: 4269
- Balinese saka calendar: N/A
- Bengali calendar: −1075 – −1074
- Berber calendar: 469
- Buddhist calendar: 63
- Burmese calendar: −1119
- Byzantine calendar: 5027–5028
- Chinese calendar: 戊午年 (Earth Horse); 2216 or 2009 — to — 己未年 (Earth Goat); 2217 or 2010
- Coptic calendar: −765 – −764
- Discordian calendar: 685
- Ethiopian calendar: −489 – −488
- Hebrew calendar: 3279–3280
- Hindu calendars
- Vikram Samvat: −425 – −424
- Shaka Samvat: N/A
- Kali Yuga: 2619–2620
- Holocene calendar: 9519
- Iranian calendar: 1103 BP – 1102 BP
- Islamic calendar: 1137 BH – 1136 BH
- Javanese calendar: N/A
- Julian calendar: N/A
- Korean calendar: 1852
- Minguo calendar: 2393 before ROC 民前2393年
- Nanakshahi calendar: −1949
- Thai solar calendar: 61–62
- Tibetan calendar: ས་ཕོ་རྟ་ལོ་ (male Earth-Horse) −355 or −736 or −1508 — to — ས་མོ་ལུག་ལོ་ (female Earth-Sheep) −354 or −735 or −1507

Year 482 BC was a year of the pre-Julian Roman calendar. At the time, it was known as the Year of the Consulship of Vibulanus and Iullus (or, less frequently, year 272 Ab urbe condita). The denomination 482 BC for this year has been used since the early medieval period, when the Anno Domini calendar era became the prevalent method in Europe for naming years.

== Events ==
=== By place ===
==== Greece ====
- The Athenian archon Themistocles secures the ostracism of his opponents and becomes the political leader of Athens. The Athenian soldier and statesman, Aristides, is one of those ostracised due to his opposition to Themistocles' naval policy.

==== China ====
- While King Fuchai of Wu attends a meeting in Huangchi, in an attempt to gain hegemony over all the other duchies of Zhou dynasty China, his capital city in the State of Wu is captured in a surprise assault by King Goujian of Yue. In 473 BC the State of Wu will be annexed by the State of Yue.

==== Rome ====
- Continuation of hostilities with the Aequi.
- Continuation of hostilities with Veii. The Veientine army enters Roman territory and ravages the countryside.
