= Gaius Servilius Structus Ahala =

Roman senator, consul in 478 BC

- Died: 478 BC
- Office: Consul (478 BC)

Gaius Servilius Structus Ahala (died c. 478 BC) was a Roman senator from the early Republic, who held the office of consul in 478 BC. During his term of office he commanded two legions in a war against the Volsci. His lack of success and the heavy casualties incurred by the army led Servilius to avoided pitched battles and revert to skirmishing with the enemy. Servilius's colleague in office, Lucius Aemilius Mamercus, waged war with greater success against the Veii. According to the Fasti Capitolini, Servilius died in office, and was replaced by one Esquilinus.

Servilius's name is confused in the ancient sources. Livy calls him Gaius Servilius simply; the Fasti Capitolini add Structus Ahala and the suffect Esquilinus; Dionysius has Gaius Sergius; and Diodorus, Gaius Cornelius Lentulus. Johannes Weber, following the evidence of Dionysius and Diodorus, argued that the name of Servilius is a later interpolation, and that the consul of 478 was confused in the sources with Servilius Structus, consul just two years later, in 476 BC. He also considered that the surname 'Ahala', which is only attested by the Capitoline Fasti, was retrojected from the later figure of Gaius Servilius Ahala, the famous murderer of Spurius Maelius. Weber was ultimately inclined to accept Diodorus's Lentulus as belonging to the best tradition. Broughton, on the other hand, accepted "Servilius" as authentic and regarded Dionysius's Sergius as a corruption. He also rejected Diodorus's "Gaius Cornelius Lentulus", since the Lentuli appear much later in history and they never used the name "Gaius". Ridley considers the matter uncertain.

== Endnotes ==
Political offices
Preceded by Caeso Fabius Vibulanus; Titus Verginius Tricostus Rutilus	Roman consul 478 BC; With: Lucius Aemilius Mamercus II	Succeeded by Esquilinus (suffect); Gaius Horatius Pulvillus; Titus Menenius Lanatus
