= 482nd =

482nd or 482d may refer to:

- 482d Bombardment Squadron, an inactive United States Air Force unit
- 482d Fighter Wing, a unit of the United States Air Force assigned to the Air Force Reserve Command
- 482d Fighter-Interceptor Squadron, an inactive United States Air Force unit
- 482d Operations Group, a United States Air Force Reserve unit assigned to the 482d Fighter Wing

== See also ==
- 482 (number)
- 482, the year 482 (CDLXXXII) of the Julian calendar
- 482 BC
