= Gaius Julius Iullus (decemvir) =

Roman statesman, consul in 482 BC

Gaius Julius Iullus (Note: The original spelling of his surname was Iullus, which is supported by the whole body of literary tradition and is used by all modern sources. Vergil in his Aeneid later popularized the spelling Iulus, with a single 'l', which was adopted by the Fasti Capitolini.) (fl. c. 482–451 BC) was a Roman statesman, who held the consulship in 482 BC. After a contentious election, he was chosen to represent the more moderate faction in Roman politics, while his colleague, Quintus Fabius Vibulanus, was elected by the aristocratic party. Both consuls led a Roman army against Veii, but withdrew when the Veientes refused to confront them. Thirty years later, in 451, Julius was chosen a member of the first decemvirate, alongside several other ex-consuls and other respected statesmen. Julius proved himself a man of good judgment and integrity, and helped to draw up the first ten tables of Roman law.

== Family ==
As his filiation reveals, Julius was the son of Gaius and grandson of Lucius. His father is generally supposed to have been the same Gaius Julius Iullus who was consul in 489 BC. Although only seven years elapsed between the two consulships, this would be perfectly reasonable, if the father had been an older man when he achieved the magistracy, and the son attained it while relatively young; this is also consistent with his serving as a decemvir thirty years later. Julius also had a brother, Vopiscus, who held the consulship in 473 BC. Julius' son and namesake was consul in 447.

== Consul ==
The consular elections for 482 BC were fraught with dissension between the aristocratic and popular parties. The aristocratic candidate was Appius Claudius, who was firmly opposed by the popular faction, which preferred older candidates whose even-handedness toward the plebeians had already been proven.

The tribunes of the plebs willingly used their veto power to prevent the comitia from meeting to elect Claudius, and there was talk of appointing a dictator, but more moderate voices prevailed, and Aulus Sempronius Atratinus was appointed interrex instead. He was followed by Spurius Larcius, who presided over the election of Gaius Julius Iullus, representing the popular party, and Quintus Fabius Vibulanus for the aristocrats. Fabius had been consul three years earlier, and was acceptable to the plebeians, particularly compared with Claudius.

During their year of office, Latium was raided by the Aequi, and Roman territory by the Veientes. The senate decided to ignore the threat from the Aequi in order to confront Veii, but the Veientes protested their innocence; and while Rome's attention was on Veii, a large Aequian force stormed and plundered the Latin town of Ortona. As the Roman ambassadors returned from Veii, they encountered a Veientine force returning from a raid in Roman territory, prompting the senate to declare war.

The question of war with Veii once again threatened the fragile peace between the orders at Rome, as the plebeians were still awaiting an allotment of land they had been promised four years earlier, and there was worry that the other Etruscan cities would rally to Veii's aid, igniting a larger war. But the aristocratic party prevailed, and sent both consuls at the head of an army to confront the Veientes. The enemy, however, remained secure within Veii's impenetrable walls, and eventually the consular army was forced to withdraw, ravaging the Veientine territory as they went. The year closed without any other noteworthy events.

== Decemvir ==
Thirty years after Julius' consulship, a committee of ten distinguished statesmen was selected to draw up a body of laws based on Roman tradition and Greek models. Julius was among the sitting senators chosen to serve as decemvir, alongside several other ex-consuls, and the consul-elect, Appius Claudius. Taking office in 451, the decemvirs assembled the first Ten Tables, to the unanimous approval of the Roman people.

Despite the considerable power that they held, the decemvirs demonstrated their mildness and willingness to work together for the public good. Never was this better exemplified than when a heinous crime was revealed to Julius. A corpse was found buried in the house of Publius Sestius. (Note: Evidently a different man from the decemvir of the same name.) Although Sestius' guilt appeared obvious, and Julius would have been entitled to pass judgment upon the man, he instead ordered that Sestius be brought to trial, and Julius himself assumed the burden of the prosecution.

The decemvirs stepped down at the end of their year of office, and were replaced by a second decemvirate, of whom only Claudius remained from the first; his true intentions toward the people soon became evident, as he dominated his colleagues and drew up two more tables of law that were deeply unfavourable to the plebeians. When they continued in office the following year without bothering to stand for re-election, the people rose against the decemvirs, and withdrew to the Aventine Hill, the site of the plebeian secession in 494, which had led to the establishment of the plebeian tribunes. Julius was one of three envoys dispatched by the senate to negotiate with the plebeians. The decemvirs were soon overthrown, and the consular government restored.

== See also ==
- Julia gens

== Bibliography ==
- Titus Livius (Livy), Ab Urbe Condita (History of Rome).
- Marcus Tullius Cicero, De Republica.
- Dionysius of Halicarnassus, Romaike Archaiologia.
- Diodorus Siculus, Bibliotheca Historica (Library of History).
- Quintus Asconius Pedianus, Orationum Ciceronis pro Cornelio de Maiestate, ed. A. C. Clark (1907).
- Dictionary of Greek and Roman Biography and Mythology, William Smith, ed., Little, Brown and Company, Boston (1849).
- T. Robert S. Broughton, The Magistrates of the Roman Republic, American Philological Association (1952).

Political offices
Preceded by Marcus Fabius Vibulanus; Lucius Valerius Potitus	Roman consul 482 BC; With: Quintus Fabius Vibulanus II	Succeeded by Caeso Fabius Vibulanus II; Spurius Furius Fusus
