= Roman–Etruscan Wars =

Conflicts between the Romans and Etruscans – 8th to 3rd centuries BCE

The Roman–Etruscan Wars, also known as the Etruscan Wars or the Etruscan–Roman Wars, were a series of wars fought between ancient Rome (in both the regal and the republican periods) and the Etruscans. Information about many of the wars is limited, particularly those in the early parts of Rome's history, and in large part is known from ancient texts alone. The conquest of Etruria was completed in 265–264 BC.

== Periodisation ==
Based on the traditional narrative of the overthrow of the Roman monarchy in 509 BC, in which the Romans ousted the Etruscan Tarquinii dynasty and established the Roman Republic, some historians put the start of the Roman–Etruscan Wars in c. 509 BC. Other historians such as Brice (2014) emphasise that little about the Etruscan Wars survives in the ancient sources: though "the general course of the war" could be discerned, it is impossible to reconstruct a continuous narrative. He argued that the wars occurred so early in Roman history that "extensive elements of the narratives are shrouded in mythology and should be heavily discounted. Livy is our best surviving source for this early period, but he wrote four centuries after the events and drew on sources that were recorded at least two centuries after the events they described." He put the beginning of the Etruscan Wars in 483 BC with the first of three Roman wars with Veii.

Similarly, Amanda Grace Self (2016) stated that "Rome's Etruscan Wars were not a simple process of expansion into barbarian-inhabited lands", but a complex series of disparate conflicts across centuries: "The Romans had no notion of a planned, unified war against the Etruscan people. Rather, the military endeavors against the city-states of Etruria were discrete reactions to an array of individual factors and events. The Etruscans themselves never united in a large-scale war against the growing strength of Rome." Rather than a single event, she wrote that the geographic proximity of the Romans and Etruscans as neighbours inhabiting opposite banks of the river Tiber naturally drove them to conflict over resources (such as the salt beds at the Tiber's mouth) and trade routes in the area, including the river itself for navigation. Usually, conflicts began with small-scale Etruscan raiding of the Roman countryside, and often ended in sieges of cities on either side.

There is also disagreement about when the Etruscan–Roman Wars ended, with Kohn (2013) pointing to the sack of Volsinii in 264 BC. Brice (2014) argued the Roman conquest of Caere in 273 BC was the effective end of the Wars, though adding that the 241 BC revolt of Falerii was "a last gasp". While Margaret Sankey (2002) dated the Roman–Etruscan Wars from c. 509 to 234 BC, she stated that Hasdrubal's defeat at the Metaurus Valley in 209 BC ended the long-standing rivalry between the Etruscans and the Romans.

== War with Fidenae and Veii under Romulus ==
War with Fidenae and Veii
Date	8th century BC
Location	Fidenae and Veii, modern-day Italy
Result	Roman victory

Belligerents
Roman Kingdom	Fidenae; Veii

Commanders and leaders
Romulus	unknown

In the 8th century BC, during the reign of Rome's first king, Romulus, the Fidenates (an Etruscan people) decided to suppress Rome as a future threat and began to lay waste to its territory, in opposition to which Romulus marched on Fidenae and camped a mile from it. Setting an ambush in the thickets, he brought the rest of the army to the gates of Fidenae to provoke them into exiting the city. Seeing the appearance of disorder the Fidenates sallied out in pursuit and were caught in the ambush. Romulus' troops wheeled, drove the Fidenates through their gates so closely that they were not able to close them, and took the town.

The Veientes were concerned at the situation with Fidenae both because of its proximity to Veii and their consanguinuity with the Fidenates (who were also Etruscan), and accordingly launched an incursion into Roman territory. After having done so, the Veientes returned to Veii with their booty. Romulus and the Roman army followed and met the Veientes in battle outside the walls of Veii. The Romans were victorious and the Veientes fled into the city. The Romans, not having the strength to take the city by storm, instead laid waste their lands. The Veientes sued for peace, and a one-hundred year treaty was concluded upon the Veientes giving to the Romans a part of their own territory.

In the second war with Fidenae and Veii in the 7th century (see below), Livy describes Fidenae as a Roman colony. It may be that a colony was established there after the defeat by Romulus.

== Second War with Fidenae and Veii, under Tullus Hostilius ==
Second War with Fidenae and Veii
Date	7th century BC
Location	Fidenae and Veii, modern-day Italy
Result	Roman victory

Belligerents
Roman Kingdom	Fidenae; Veii

Commanders and leaders
Tullus Hostilius	unknown

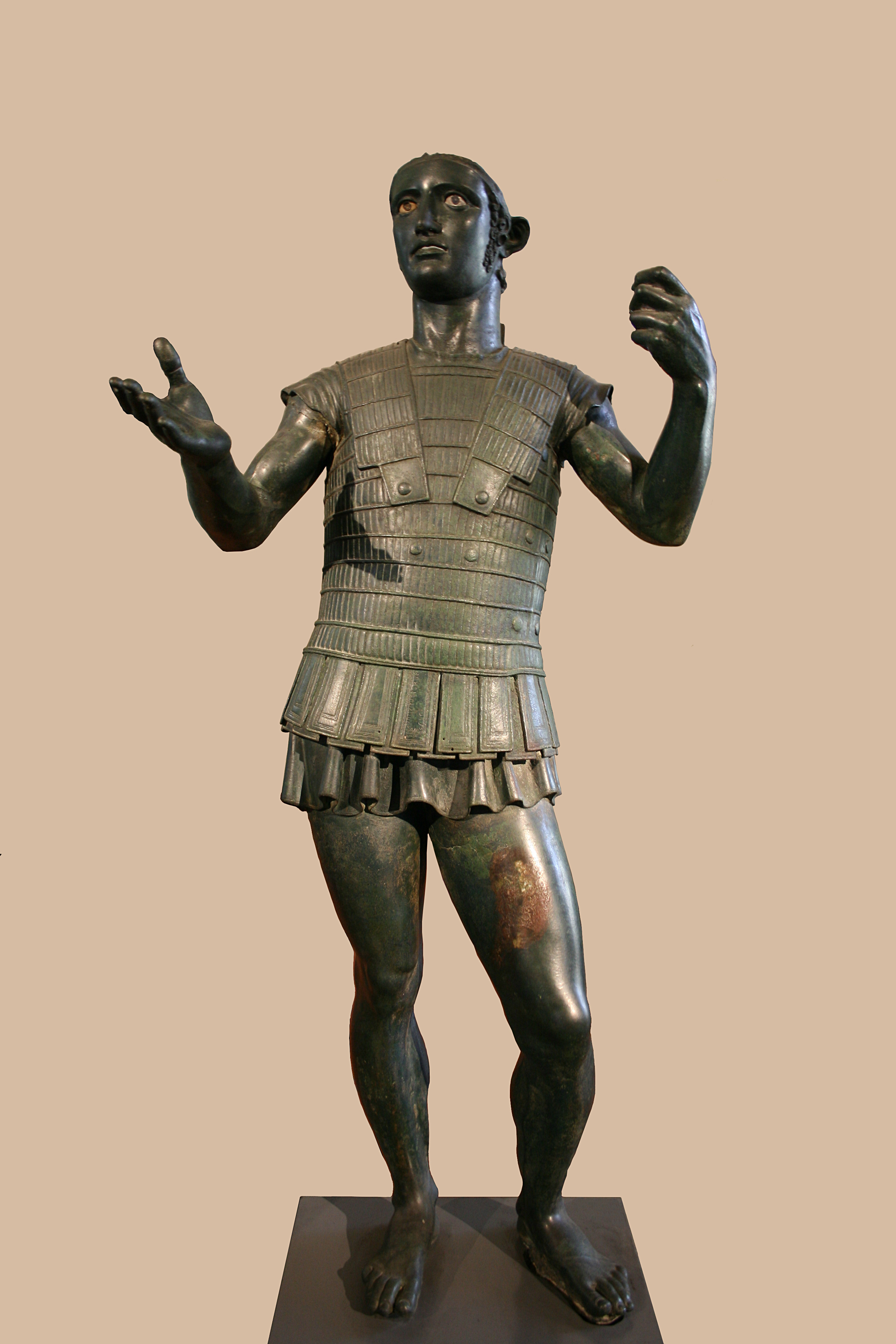
The Mars of Todi, a life-sized bronze sculpture of a soldier making a votive offering, late 5th to early 4th century BC

In the 7th century BC, during the reign of Rome's third king, Tullus Hostilius, the Fidenates and Veientes again went to war with Rome. According to Livy they were incited to war by Mettius Fufetius, the dictator of Alba Longa, who had been defeated by and had become in substance a vassal of Rome.

The Fidenates openly revolted against Rome. Tullus summoned Mettius and his army from Alba Longa and, together with the Roman army, marched on Fidenae. The Roman and Alban army crossed the Anio and camped near the confluence of the Anio and the Tiber. The army of Veii also crossed the Tiber, and, with the Fidenates, formed up battle lines next to the river, the Veientes closest to the river and the Fidenates nearest the mountains. The Roman-Alban army formed up facing them, the Romans towards the Veientes and the Albans towards the Fidenates.

The battle commenced. However, Mettius and the Alban troops headed slowly towards the mountains, intending to desert. Tullus exhorted his troops, telling them the Alban army had moved pursuant to his orders. The Fidenates, who being Roman colonists understood Latin, heard what Tullus said about the Albans and feared the Alban army would charge down upon them from the rear: accordingly they fled the battle. The Romans then routed the Veientes.

== War with the Etruscans, under Servius Tullius ==
In the 6th century BC, according to Livy, Rome's sixth king Servius Tullius went to war with Veii (after the expiry of an earlier truce) and with the rest of the Etruscans. Little is said of the war, except that the king was conspicuous for his valour and good fortune, that he routed a great army of the Etruscans and Veientes, and that the war helped cement his position in Rome, as he had only recently become king. According to the Fasti Triumphales, Servius celebrated three triumphs over the Etruscans, including on 25 November 571 BC and 25 May 567 BC (the date of the third triumph is not legible on the Fasti).

Livy records that during the reign of Servius' successor, Tarquinius Superbus, Rome renewed a treaty with the Etruscans. It is not clear which earlier peace treaty was renewed.

== War with Veii and Tarquinii, after the overthrow of the monarchy in 509 BC ==
In 509 BC the Roman monarchy was overthrown, and the republic commenced with the election of the first consuls. The deposed king, Lucius Tarquinius Superbus, whose family originated from Tarquinii in Etruria, garnered the support of the cities of Veii and Tarquinii, recalling to the former their regular losses of war and of land to the Roman state, and to the latter his family ties. The armies of the two cities followed Tarquin to battle but were defeated by the Roman army in the Battle of Silva Arsia. The consul Valerius collected the spoils of the routed Etruscans, and returned to Rome to celebrate a triumph on 1 March 509 BC.

Livy writes that later in 509 BC Valerius returned to fight the Veientes. It is unclear whether this was continuing from the Battle of Silva Arsia, or was some fresh dispute. It is also unclear what happened in this dispute.

== War with Clusium in 508 BC ==
Siege of Rome
Date	508 BC
Location	Rome
Result	Peace treaty

Belligerents
Roman Republic	Clusium

Commanders and leaders
Publius Valerius Publicola; Titus Lucretius Tricipitinus; Horatius Cocles; Cloelia; Gaius Mucius Scaevola	Lars Porsenna

Lucius Tarquinius Superbus the last King of Rome, having failed to regain the throne using his allies of Tarquinii and Veii, next sought the aid of Lars Porsena, king of Clusium in 508 BC. Clusium was at that time a powerful Etruscan city.

The Roman Senate heard of the approach of Porsena's army, and were afraid lest the people of Rome should out of fear let the enemy into the city. Accordingly, the senate took a number of measures to strengthen the resolve of the populace, including purchasing grain from the Volsci and from Cumae, nationalising licences for the sale of salt (which was at the time costly), and exempting the lower classes from taxes and port customs duties. The measures were successful, and the mood of the populace turned against the enemy.

Porsena and his forces attacked Rome. As his troops were surging towards the Pons Sublicius, one of the bridges over the Tiber leading into the city, Publius Horatius Cocles leapt across the bridge to hold off the enemy, giving the Romans time to destroy the bridge. He was joined by Titus Herminius Aquilinus and Spurius Larcius. Herminius and Larcius retreated as the bridge was almost destroyed. Horatius waited until the bridge had fallen, then swam back across the river under enemy fire. A statue was erected to Horatius in the comitium, along with land at the public expense, and also private awards.

As the attack had been unsuccessful, Porsena next determined to blockade the city. He established a garrison on the Janiculum, blocked river transport, and sent raiding parties into the surrounding countryside.

During the siege, the consul Valerius baited a group of the Clusian army with a herd of cattle driven out through the Esquiline Gate. Titus Herminius was ordered to lay in wait along the Via Gabina, two miles from Rome. Spurius Larcius was posted with troops inside the Colline Gate; consul Titus Lucretius Tricipitinus waited with troops at the Naevian Gate; while Valerius himself led troops down from the Coelian Hill. The trap was successful, and the band of Clusians were killed.

The siege continued. Next, with the approval of the senate a Roman youth named Gaius Mucius stealthily entered the Etruscan camp with the intent of assassinating Porsena. However, when Mucius came close to the king, he could not tell the king and his secretary apart, and killed the secretary in error. Mucius was captured by the Etruscans, and brought before Porsena. He openly declared his identity and what had been his intent. He threatened that he was but merely the first of three hundred Roman youths who would attempt such a deed. To demonstrate the determination of the Romans, Mucius thrust his right hand into one of the Etruscan camp fires, thereby earning for himself and his descendants the cognomen Scaevola ("Lefty"). Mucius was also granted farming land on the right hand bank of the Tiber, which later became known as the Mucia Prata (Mucian Meadows). Porsena, shocked at the youth's bravery, dismissed him from the Etruscan camp, free to return to Rome.

Most historical sources say the siege ended with a peace treaty.

At this point, according to Livy, Porsena sent ambassadors to Rome to offer peace. Terms were negotiated. Porsena requested the throne be restored to Tarquinius, but the Romans refused. However the Romans did agree to return to the Veientes lands taken from them in previous wars, and Roman hostages were agreed to be given in exchange for the withdrawal from the Janiculum of the Etruscan garrison.

The peace was agreed, and hostages taken by Porsena. One of the hostages, a young woman named Cloelia, fled the Etruscan camp, leading away a group of Roman virgins. Porsena demanded she be returned, and the Romans consented. Upon her return, however, Porsena, being impressed by her bravery, allowed her to choose half the remaining hostages to be freed. She selected from among the hostages the young Roman boys to be freed. The Romans honoured Cloelia with the unusual honour of a statue at the top of the Via Sacra, showing Cloelia mounted on a horse—that is, as an eques.

Livy recounts that during his own time, public auctions of goods at Rome were by tradition referred to as "selling the goods of king Porsena", and that this somehow relates to the war with Clusium. Livy concludes most likely it is because, when Porsena departed Rome, he left behind as a gift for the Romans his stores of provisions.

Livy also records that, after the war, a number of the Etruscan soldiers returned to Rome to seek shelter following the War between Clusium and Aricia, and that a number of the Etruscans remained in Rome, and were granted an area to live which became known as the Vicus Tuscus.

In 507 BC Porsena once again sent ambassadors to the Roman senate, requesting the restoration of Tarquinius to the throne. Legates were sent back to Porsena, to advise him that the Romans would never re-admit Tarquinius, and that Porsena should out of respect for the Romans cease requesting Tarquinius' readmittance. Porsena agreed, telling Tarquinius to continue his exile elsewhere than Clusium. Porsena also restored to the Romans their hostages, and also the lands of Veii that had been taken from Rome by treaty.

Although the ancient Romans believed the siege was a historical event that had taken place, many modern historians think the war was at least partly mythical.

== War between Rome and the Sabines in 505–504 BC ==
In 505–504 BC there was war between republican Rome and the Sabines. Although Livy makes no mention of the involvement of the Etruscans, the Fasti Triumphales record that the consul Publius Valerius Poplicola celebrated a triumph over both the Sabines and the Veientes in May 504 BC.

== The Fabian war with Veii in 483–476 BC ==
In the years between 483 and 476 BC the Veientes waged a war against Rome, assisted by auxiliaries from among the Etruscans. On the Roman side, the members of the gens Fabia featured prominently, and it became almost a personal struggle by that family against Veii. Rome was successful in the war.

Livy suggests that in the first year of the war the Romans paid little attention to it, as their own strength was more than sufficient, and they were distracted by internal matters. However the Veientine army entered Roman territory in the following year, 482 BC, and ravaged the countryside. Livy also says that the Veientes threatened to besiege Rome itself in the following year, 481 BC, but that command of the Roman forces was given to the consul Spurius Furius Medullinus and nothing notable occurred in that year.

In 480 BC, Rome was rent by internal dissension, which encouraged the Veientes to take the field in the hope of breaking Roman power. They were supported by troops from other Etruscan cities.

The consuls, Marcus Fabius Vibulanus and Gnaeus Manlius Cincinnatus, mindful of the undisciplined conduct of the soldiers in the recent past, held their men back from fighting until repeated provocations by the Etruscan cavalry made the start of combat inevitable. Fabius compelled those of the soldiers who were most eager to engage the enemy to swear to return victorious before he would give the order for battle. Once the fight had begun, the Roman commanders fought with great vigor, particularly after Quintus Fabius, the brother of the consul, was slain. Manlius, leading the army's opposite wing, was dangerously wounded and forced to retire from the line. As his men began to fall back in disarray, Marcus Fabius arrived to prevent their slaughter and assure them that their leader was not dead. Manlius was able to appear himself and reassure the soldiers.

The Etruscans took advantage of a lull in the fighting to attack the Roman camp, breaching the defenses of the reserves. However, word of the attack reached the consuls, and Manlius stationed his men around the exits to the camp, surrounding the Etruscans. Desperate to make their escape, the invaders assaulted the consul's position, and after a volley of missiles was repulsed, a final charge overwhelmed Manlius, who was mortally wounded. The Roman troops again began to panic, but one of the fallen consul's officers moved his body and cleared a way for the Etruscans to escape, allowing Fabius to crush them as they fled.

Although the battle was a great victory for Fabius, the loss of his brother and his colleague was a severe blow, and he declined the honor of a triumph that had been offered by the Senate.

In 479 BC the war with Veii was assigned to the consul Titus Verginius Tricostus Rutilus, while his colleague Kaeso Fabius was dealing with an incursion by the Aequi. Verginius, being too hasty, was almost cut off along with his army, and was only saved when Fabius arrived with his army after dealing with the Aequi.

In the same year the Fabii addressed the senate, proposing that their family alone bear the financial and military burden of the war with Veii. The senate agreed, with thanks, and the people extolled the name of the Fabii. The following day the Fabii armed themselves and, numbering 306 including the consul, marched through Rome and out of the right side of the Carmental Gate. Heading north, they set up camp at the Cremera and fortified a post.

In 478 BC the Fabii successfully ravaged the territory of Veii. The Veientes called up an army of Etruscans, and attacked the Fabian post at the Cremera. A Roman army led by the consul Lucius Aemilius Mamercus came to relieve the siege, and a charge by the Roman cavalry resulted in the retreat of the Veientine army, who withdrew to the Saxa Rubra and sued for peace.

In 477 BC hostilities were renewed, and the fighting increased, with incursions by the Fabii into Veientine territory, and vice versa. The Veientes devised an ambush, which led to the Battle of the Cremera, most likely on 18 July 477 BC, in which the Veientes were victorious and all the Fabii killed. Only Quintus Fabius Vibulanus survived because he was too young to go to war and therefore stayed in Rome.

Upon hearing of the grave defeat, the Roman senate sent the consul Titus Menenius Lanatus with an army against the Veientes, but the Romans were defeated once again. The Veientes marched on Rome, and occupied the Janiculum. The Roman senate recalled the other consul Gaius Horatius Pulvillus from the Volsci, and there were two indecisive battles against the Veientes, the first near the temple of Spes near the Praenestine Gate, and the second at the Colline gate. Thereafter the Veientes withdrew from Rome and set about ravaging the countryside, until they were defeated by the Romans in the following year.

== Veii-Sabine alliance 475–474 BC ==
In 475 BC the Veientes and Sabines commenced hostilities against Rome, only a year after the defeat of Veii in the previous war.

The consul Publius Valerius Poplicola was assigned the conduct of the war. The Roman army was reinforced by auxiliaries from the Latin allies and the Hernici.

The Sabine army was camped outside the walls of Veii. The Roman army attacked the Sabine defences. The Sabines sallied forth from their camp, but the Romans had the better of the fighting, and took the gate of the Sabine camp. The forces of Veii then attacked from the city, but in some disorder, and a Roman cavalry charge routed the Veientes, giving Rome the overall victory.

Valerius was awarded a triumph for the victory, which he celebrated on 1 May.

In the following year the consul Gnaeus Manlius Vulso was assigned the war, but no fighting occurred, as the Veientes sued for peace, which the Romans accepted. Upon the Veientes giving tribute of grain and money, a truce of forty years was agreed. Manlius was awarded an ovation as a result, which he celebrated on 15 March.

== Fighting at Sutrium, Nepete and near Tarquinii 389–386 BC ==
=== Ancient narratives ===
In 390 BC a Gaulish warband first defeated the Roman army at the Battle of the Allia and then sacked Rome. The ancient writers report that in 389 the Etruscans, Volsci, and Aequi all raised armies in hope of exploiting this blow to Roman power. According to Livy the leading men of all of Etruria gathered at the sanctuary of Voltumna to form an alliance against Rome. Beset by dangers on all sides, the Romans appointed Marcus Furius Camillus dictator. Camillus chose to march against the Volsci first, leaving, according to Livy, a force commanded by consular tribune L. Aemilius Mamercinus in the Veientine territory to guard against the Etruscans. In the course of two campaigns Camillus inflicted crushing victories against the Volsci and the Aequi and was now ready to take on the Etruscans.

Livy and Plutarch, and more summarily Diodorus Siculus, narrate the fighting between Romans and Etruscans in very similar terms. While Camillus was away campaigning against the Volsci, the Etruscans laid siege to Sutrium, a Roman ally. The Sutrines sent to Rome for aid and Camillus, now victorious against the Volsci and Aequi, marched to their relief, but before any help could arrive they were forced into a conditional surrender, being allowed to leave without weapons and only one garment apiece. Meeting the exiled Sutrines that same day, Camillus ordered the baggage left behind and marched his now unencumbered army to Sutrium where he found the enemy still dispersed and busy plundering the city. Camillus ordered all the gates closed and attacked before the Etruscans could concentrate their forces. The now trapped Etruscans at first intended to fight to the end, but when hearing that their lives would be spared, they surrendered in great numbers. Sutrium was thus captured twice in the same day. Livy provides a description of the amount of spoils taken. Having won three simultaneous wars, Camillus returned to Rome in triumph. The Etruscan prisoners were publicly sold; after the gold owed to Rome's matrons had been repaid (they had contributed their gold to ransom Rome from the Gauls), enough was left for three golden bowls inscribed with the name of Camillus and placed in the Temple of Jupiter Optimus Maximus before the feet of the statue of Juno.

Livy is our only written source for the subsequent years. He writes that in 388 a Roman army invaded the territory of Tarquinii where the towns of Cortuosa and Contenebra were captured. The former was taken by surprise and fell at the first assault. At Contenebra a small garrison attempted to resist, but after a few days succumbed to superior Roman numbers.

In 387 there were rumours in Rome that Etruria was in arms and the Romans once again turned to Camillus who was one of six elected consular tribunes for 386. However, Camillus was diverted by news that the Volscians had invaded the Pomptine territory. With Camillus occupied, the Etruscans attacked the border strongholds of Nepete and Sutrium. However, Camillus soon defeated the Volscians; meanwhile, a second army was raised at Rome. Camillus and his colleague P. Valerius Potitus Poplicola received command of this second army and the war against the Etruscans. By the time Camillus and Valerius arrived at Sutrium, the Etruscans had taken half the city, the Sutrines desperately defending the rest behind street barricades. Camillus divided his army into two and ordered his colleague to attack the walls on the side the enemy was holding. Attacked from both within and without the city, the Etruscans fled in panic and were killed in great numbers. Having recaptured Sutrium, the Roman army marched to Nepete, which by that time had surrendered to the Etruscans after treachery from some of the townsmen. Camillus first attempted to convince the Nepesines to throw out the Etruscans. When they refused, he captured the city by storm. All the Etruscans and those who had sided with them were killed and a Roman garrison put in place. After this victory no further conflict is reported between Romans and Etruscans until 358 when Rome again clashed with Tarquinii.

=== Modern interpretations ===
The sources frequently refer to meetings of the Etruscan league at the temple of Voltumna. The league still existed during the Roman Empire when it met near Volsinii; this might have been the meeting place during the 4th century as well. However, modern historians consider the Etruscan league to have been a purely religious organization dedicated to celebrate common Etruscan festivals, it was never a military alliance. Rather, the Roman annalistic records and other sources seem to describe a disunited Etruria divided into several rival city states. References to all of Etruria united against Rome are therefore considered unhistorical. The original Roman records perhaps stated there had been fighting against "the Etruscans" without specifying the city. Later writers have then expanded this to involve all of Etruria including plausible, but fictitious, meetings of the Etruscan league.

The many similarities between accounts of the campaigns of 389 and 386—in both Camillus is placed in command, defeats the Volsci and comes to the aid of Sutrium—has caused several modern authors to consider these to be doublets (Note: A doublet in textual criticism is defined as the presence of two or more narrative accounts in a text that describe the same event (often as a result of the accounts conflicting with or varying from each other).) of each other. This was the view taken by Beloch who held that the Gallic sack had a severe and long-lasting effect on Rome's fortunes. Accordingly, Camillus' stunning victories against the Etruscans and Volsci so soon after must be inventions designed to minimize the scale of the Roman defeat. Different later writers then treated these invented victories in different ways, assigning them to different years with different incidental detail, until in Livy's writings they emerge as separate, but ultimately both unhistorical, events.

Cornell (1995) believes the Gallic sack of Rome to have been a setback from which she rapidly recovered, and sees the Roman victories that followed as continuation of an aggressive expansionist policy begun in the 420s. The accounts of these victories have been exaggerated and elaborated, and some events duplicated, but essentially describe historical events that fit into this broader picture of Roman expansion. While the role of Camillus has been exaggerated, the frequency in which he is recorded to have held office attest to his political importance in Rome during this era.

Oakley (1997) considers the accounts of a Roman victory against Etruscans in 389 to be historical, although all the details beyond the bare fact that Sutrium was successfully relieved have likely been invented. Except for the repayment of the gold to the matrons, Livy's description of Camillus' 389 triumph could be based on authentic information, if so this would help confirm the fighting in 389. He also believes the campaign of 386 could be historical as well, although with some of the detail transplanted from 389. A major victory by Camillus in this year would explain why no further fighting is recorded on Rome's Etruscan frontier until 358.

Forsythe (2005) takes a more sceptical view. He believes only the existence of three golden bowls dedicated by Camillus to Juno to be historical. From these ancient writers have invented a series of lightning victories against the traditional enemies of Rome at the time of Camillus—viz., the Etruscans, the Aequi and the Volsci—and dated them to the year after the Gallic sack when Rome was supposed to be beset by enemies on all sides.

Livy's report of the capture of Cortuosa and Contenebra in 388 has received much less skepticism than the campaigns of 389 and 386. No further records of Cortuosa and Contenebra have been preserved and their sites are today unknown. As there would have been little incentive for ancient writers to invent the capture of obscure villages, modern historians tend to consider mention of otherwise unknown sites to be based on genuine records. Excavations at modern San Giovenale near Tarquinii have revealed a settlement founded about 650 and destroyed in the early 4th century. While San Giovenale's identity as ancient Cortuosa or Contenebra cannot be confirmed, it is still reasonable to attribute its destruction to the campaign described by Livy under 388

== War with Tarquinii, Falerii and Caere 359–351 BC ==
As usual Livy provides the only full narrative for this war. Parts of his account are corroborated by Diodorus and the Fasti Triumphales.

=== Ancient narratives ===
Livy writes that in 358 BC, Rome declared war on Tarquinii after forces from that city had raided Roman territory. Consul Gaius Fabius Ambustus was assigned to that war. However, the Tarquinienses defeated Fabius and sacrificed 307 Roman prisoners of war. The following year, 357, Rome also declared war against the Falisci. They had fought with the Tarquinienses and refused to give up the Roman deserters who had fled to Falerii after their defeat, even though the Fetials had demanded their surrender. This campaign was assigned to consul Gnaeus Manlius Capitolinus Imperiosus. He, however, accomplished nothing of note except convening his army, at camp near Sutrium, in Assembly and passing a law taxing the manumission of slaves. Worrying about the precedent this could set, the tribunes of the plebs made it a capital offence to convene the Assembly outside the usual place. D.S. also records a war between the Romans and the Falisci where nothing of note took place—only raiding and pillaging.

According to Livy, in 356, consul M. Fabius Ambustus commanded the Romans against the Falisci and Tarquinienses. The Etruscan army had brought priests wielding snakes and torches, and at first this sight caused the Roman soldiers to flee in panic back to their entrenchments, but the consul shamed his men into resuming the struggle. The Etruscans were scattered and their camp captured. This caused the whole of Etruria to rise, and, under the leadership of the Tarquinienses and Falisci, they marched against the Roman salt works. In this emergency the Romans nominated C. Marcius Rutilus as dictator, the first time a plebeian had been so named. Marcius transported his troops across the Tiber on rafts. After first catching a number of Etruscan raiders, he captured the Etruscan camp in a surprise attack and took 8,000 prisoners, the rest either killed or chased out of Roman territory. The people of Rome awarded Marcius with a triumph, but this was not confirmed by the senate. This is supported by the Fasti Triumphales, which records that C. Marcius Rutilus, dictator, triumphed over the Etruscans on 6 May. According to D.S. the Etruscans pillaged Roman territory, raiding as far as the Tiber before returning home.

According to some of the writers consulted by Livy, in 355 consul C. Sulpicius Peticus ravaged the territory of Tarquinii, but others held that he commanded jointly with his colleague against the Tiburtines. Then, in 354, the Romans forced the Tarquinienses to surrender after killing a large number of them in battle. The prisoners taken were all put to the sword, except 358 nobles who were sent to Rome, where they were scourged and beheaded in the Forum as retribution for the Romans immolated by the Tarquinienses in 358. According to Diodorus only 260 were executed in the Forum.

Livy is the only source for the final years of the war. In 353 rumours reached Rome that the people of Caere had sided with Tarquinii in sympathy with their fellow Etruscans. These were confirmed when consul C. Sulpicius Peticus, who was ravaging Tarquinian territory, reported that the Roman salt-works had been raided. Part of the plunder had been sent to Caere and no doubt some of the raiders had been men of Caere. Accordingly, the Romans nominated Titus Manlius Torquatus dictator and declared war upon Caere. The Caerites now bitterly regretted their actions and sent envoys to Rome to plead for peace. In view of their old friendship the Romans granted the Caerites a hundred-year truce. The Romans then turned their attention to the Falisci, but no enemy was found in the field and the Roman army returned home after ravaging Faliscan territory, having made no attempt at any enemy city.

In 352 due to rumours—groundless, as it turned out—that the twelve cities of Etruria had formed a league against Rome, the Romans decided to appoint a dictator. Gaius Julius Iulus was nominated by the consuls while they were still in camp, rather than in the city as usual. During 351, the final year of the war, consul T. Quinctius Pennus Capitolinus Crispinus campaigned against Falerii and his colleague C. Sulpicius Peticus against Tarquinii. There was no battle, but the Falisci and Tarquinienses were weary of war after having their territories ravaged year after year, and asked for a truce. The Romans granted each city a forty-years' truce.

=== Modern interpretation ===
Modern historians accept as historical the overall outline of the war, but the historicity of many individual events have been disputed. Livy, as usual, makes aggression by Rome's enemies the cause of the war, and, in this case, that may well be true. Rome was, at the time, already involved in a serious war against Tibur and invading Gauls, and Tarquinii's war goals aggressive: to wrest control of the lower Tiber from Rome. Caere here appear rather subservient to Tarquinii. The Falerii may have been motivated by a desire to reclaim the territories lost to Rome some forty years earlier.

Some scholars have seen the sacrifice of 307 Roman prisoners as another version of legendary Battle of the Cremera where 306 men of the Fabii are supposed to have fallen in battle against the Etruscans. Others have made comparisons with depictions of gladiators and killing of prisoners in Etruscan art. The priests brandishing snakes and torches could be inventions, but could also reflect an Etruscan magical rite which Livy and his sources have not understood.

While Beloch rejected the dictatorship of Marcius Rutilus, Oakley (1998) believes it unlikely that the first plebeian dictatorship had been invented. Roman historians appear to have invented many early casualty reports, but they also seem to have had access to authentic records of enemies killed and captured from the late 4th century. The notice of 8,000 Etruscans killed in 356 might therefore likewise date back to contemporary records. Casualty figures are in any case notoriously prone to exaggeration both by commanders and historians. Forsythe (2005) has proposed this campaign as the context for the foundation of Ostia, Rome's port. Traditional history attributes the founding to Rome's fourth king, Ancus Marcius (traditionally reigned 640–616 BC); however, the oldest archaeological finds at the site have been dated to the mid-4th century. Protecting the coast and the mouth of the Tiber from Tarquinian attacks would have provided motive for founding a colony here; later historians might then have confused the dictator Marcius Rutilus with king Ancus Marcius.

Scourging followed by beheading was common Roman practice and this detail might be just plausible invention by a later annalist. Some historians believe Caere became a civitas sine suffragio in 353, but this theory is rejected by Oakley (1998) who thinks this only happened in 274/273. C. Julius Iullus, the dictator of 352, is otherwise unknown. This and the constitutional peculiarities of his appointment may vouch for the historicity of this dictatorship. Time-limited truces were not used by the Late Roman Republic; these are therefore unlikely to have been invented and provide a secure date for the end of this war. As usual Livy portrays Rome as victorious, but with the war dominated by raiding and no records of any towns attacked the scale of the fighting appears to have been limited. Rome was certainly not yet able at this stage to dominate Etruria.

=== Battles of Lake Vadimo ===
Lake Vadimo was the scene of virtually the final battles between Etruscans and Romans in 310 and 283 BC, in both of which the Romans were victorious.

== Conclusion of the wars ==
=== Battle of Volterrae, 298 BC ===
Prior to 298 BC war had already broken out between Rome and Etruria when the Etruscans decided to invade Rome in combination with some Gallic allies they had purchased. The planned attack was a violation of a former treaty with Rome. The Gauls reneged and the Etruscans found themselves facing a Roman army under consul Titus Manlius who however died after a fall from his horse in a display of horsemanship. The election held to replace him made Marcus Valerius Corvus consul. He joined the army in Etruria and began to lay waste to the country hoping to provoke the Etruscans to battle, which they refused.

In 298 BC Appius Claudius followed by Publius Sulpicius became interreges for reasons unknown. Sulpicius held an election, which brought Barbatus and Gnaeus Fulvius Maximus Centumatus into consular office. The Lucanians spoke before the Senate saying that the Samnites were devastating their country and asking for the protection of Rome in exchange for a treaty and hostages. The Senate assented after a few moments' deliberation and dispatched heralds to tell the Samnites to withdraw. Encountering the Samnite army they were told that if they spoke in Samnium they would never leave there alive; consequently, the Senate declared war on Samnium. In a casting of lots as to which consul would take which war Barbatus won command of the army in Etruria while Centumatus undertook the initial campaign in the Third Samnite War.

The Etruscans attacked immediately before Volterra. A day-long battle brought no victory but in the night the Etruscans withdrew to their fortified cities leaving their camp and equipment to the Romans. Encamping his army at the Etrurian border Barbatus led a lightly armed force in the devastation of the countryside.

=== Last Battles ===
Vulci was strong enough to further resist until Tiberius Coruncanius triumphed over them in 280 BC.

Rome was the eventual victor in the wars and the last Etruscan resistance was crushed in 264 BC when Volsinii was destroyed after a slave revolt. The Etruscans were assimilated into Roman culture and Rome became one of the Mediterranean superpowers amongst the Greeks and the Carthaginians, though the Etruscan language survived for another 300 years (until the early first century AD).

== See also ==
- Roman conquest of Italy

== Bibliography ==
- Brice, Lee L. (2014). Warfare in the Roman Republic: From the Etruscan Wars to the Battle of Actium: From the Etruscan Wars to the Battle of Actium. ABC-CLIO. pp. 66–70. ISBN 978-1610692991.
- Cornell, T. J. (1995). The Beginnings of Rome – Italy and Rome from the Bronze Age to the Punic Wars (c. 1000–264 BC). New York: Routledge. ISBN 978-0-415-01596-7.
- Forsythe, Gary (2005). A Critical History of Early Rome. Berkeley: University of California Press. ISBN 0-520-24991-7.
- Kohn, George Childs (2013). Dictionary of Wars. Abingdon: Routledge. pp. 165–167. ISBN 978-1135954949.
- Oakley, S. P. (1997). A Commentary on Livy Books VI–X. Vol. I: Introduction and Book VI. Oxford: Oxford University Press. ISBN 0-19-815277-9.
- Oakley, S. P. (1998), A Commentary on Livy Books VI–X, vol. II: Books VII–VIII, Oxford: Oxford University Press, ISBN 978-0-19-815226-2
- Sankey, Margaret (2002). "Roman–Etruscan Wars (509–234 B.C.E.)". In Sandler, Stanley (ed.). Ground Warfare: An International Encyclopedia, Volume 1. ABC-CLIO. pp. 748–749. ISBN 978-1576073445.
- Self, Amanda Grace (2016). "Etruscan Wars". In Phang, Sara Elise (ed.). Conflict in Ancient Greece and Rome: The Definitive Political, Social, and Military Encyclopedia. ABC-CLIO. pp. 893–895. ISBN 978-1610690201.
