= Mars of Todi =

Ancient bronze statue from Italy

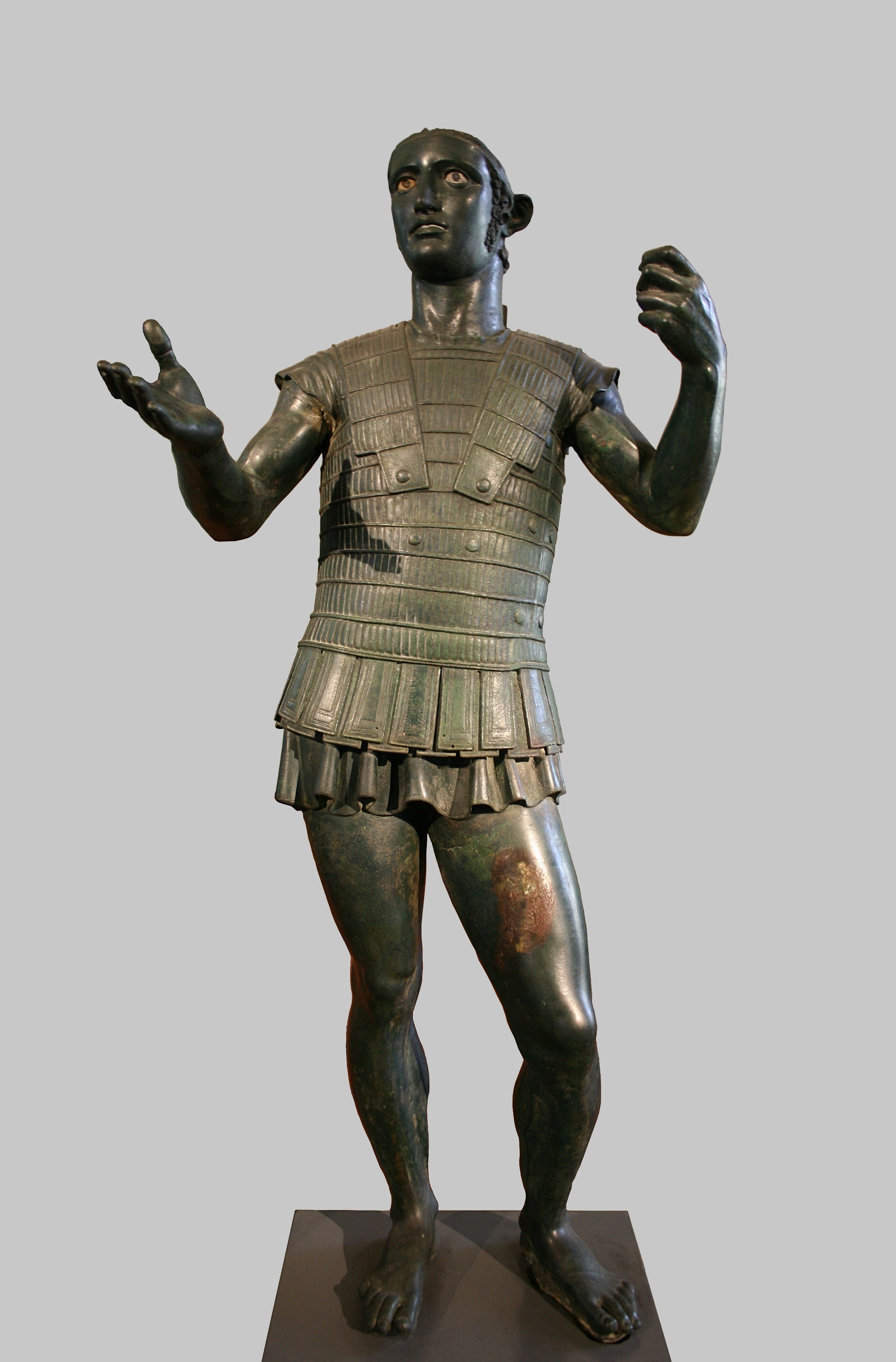
The "Mars" of Todi, a life-sized bronze

The Mars of Todi is a near life-sized bronze warrior, dating from the late 5th or early 4th century BC, believed to have been produced in Etruria for the Umbrian tribe. It was found near Todi (ancient Tuder), on the slope of Montesanto, in the property of the Franciscan Convent of Montesanto.

== Description and Interpretation ==
The bronze warrior was an expensive votive offering likely placed at a religious sanctuary, possibly to Laran, the Etruscan god of war. It had been buried in antiquity under travertine stones, perhaps ritually, and left undisturbed until its discovery in 1835. It is an example of the highest-quality "prestige" works from Etruria found in Umbria during this period, and probably came from a workshop in Orvieto (Etruscan Velzna, Roman Volsinii). Velzna was known for its bronze sculptures, more than 2,000 of which were looted by the Romans in 265 BC.

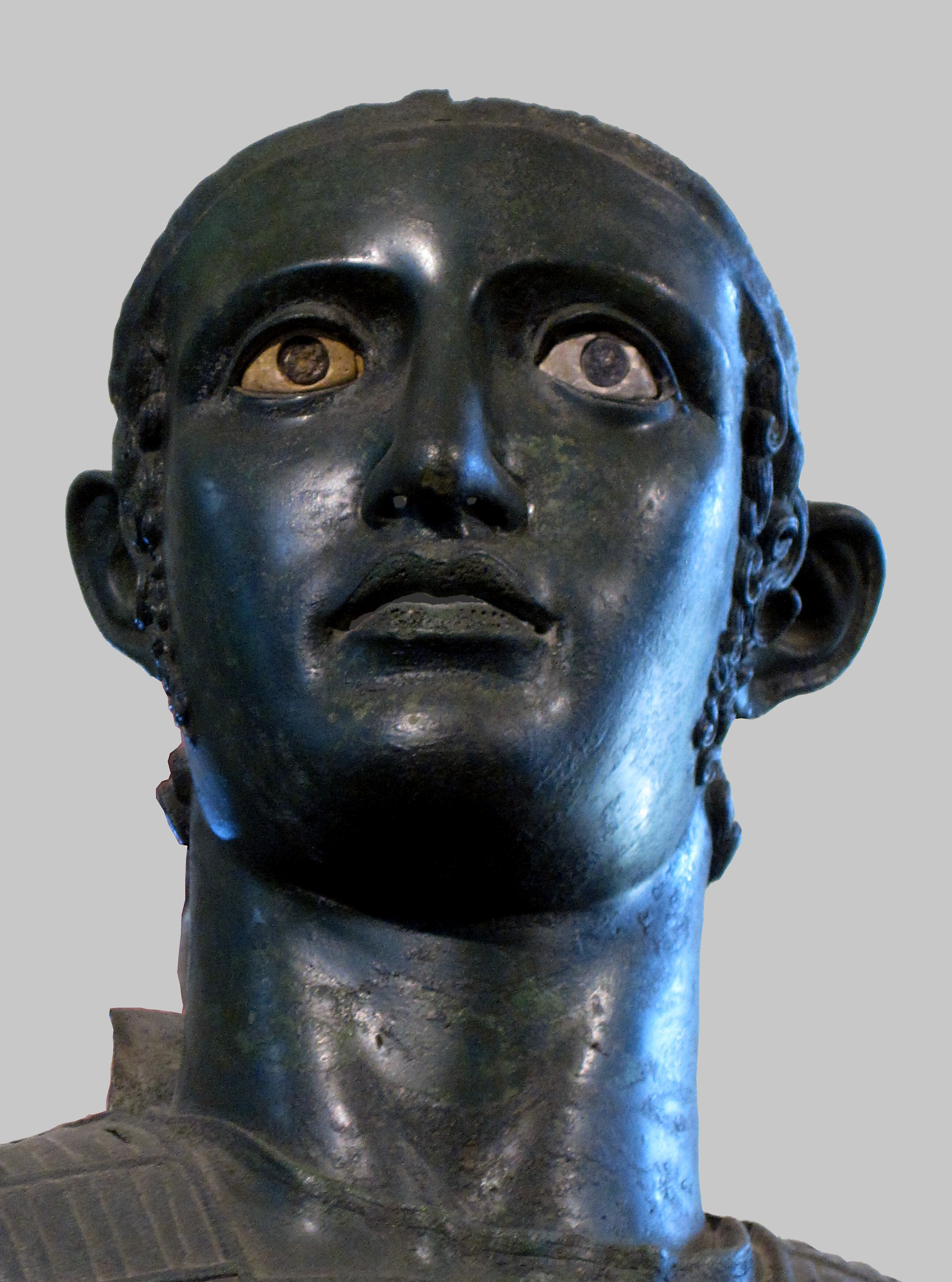
Detail of the warrior's "large, empty face," as described by Otto Brendel

The work is a "typical military figure" with "conspicuously Etruscan" facial features. It is an Etruscan realization of Greek formal Classicism, and makes use of the contrapposto posture. The figure probably held a patera (libation bowl) in his extended right hand, and a spear in the left. His helmet is missing, but his intricate body armor, depicted with "pedantic accuracy," is one of the best examples showing what lamellar plate armor from the period looked like. While after its discovery in the 19th century, the statue of a warrior was said to represent a god equivalent to the Roman Mars, others see the represented act of libation would not befit a god, thus that the statue depicts a human soldier and devotee.

The dedication is inscribed on the skirt of the breastplate. It is written in Umbrian in Etruscan characters and marks the beginning of the epigraphic tradition in this part of Umbria. The man dedicating it, however, has a name that appears to have a Celtic origin, an indication of Tuder's "cosmopolitian" character in the Archaic period. The inscription reads Ahal Trutitis dunum dede, "Ahal Trutitis gave [this as a] gift".

The sculpture is currently held by the Museo Etrusco Gregoriano section of the Vatican Museums.
