= Servius Cornelius Maluginensis =

Roman senator, consul in 485 BC

Consul of the Roman Republic
- In office 1 September 485 BC – 29 August 484 BC Serving with Quintus Fabius Vibulanus (consul 485 BC)
- Preceded by: Spurius Cassius Vecellinus, Proculus Verginius Tricostus Rutilus
- Succeeded by: Caeso Fabius Vibulanus (consul), Lucius Aemilius Mamercus

Personal details
- Born: Unknown Ancient Rome
- Died: 453 BC Ancient Rome
- Children: Lucius Cornelius Maluginensis Uritus Cossus

Servius Cornelius Maluginensis was a Roman senator who was elected consul in 485 BC.

== Family ==
Maluginensis was from the patrician Cornelii Maluginenses, one of the oldest attested branches of the gens Cornelia. It is possible that he carried the agnomen of "Tricostus." He was the son of a Publius Cornelius Maluginensis and he was the father of Lucius Cornelius Maluginensis Uritus Cossus (consul of 459 BC) and the grandfather of Marcus Cornelius Maluginensis (decemvir in 450 BC, and decemvir with consular power between 450 and 449 BC).

== Biography ==
In 485 BC, he was elected consul with Quintus Fabius Vibulanus. At the beginning of their term, Spurius Cassius Vecellinus was condemned for perduellio by the quaestors Kaeso Fabius Vibulanus and Lucius Valerius Potitus Publicola, and was put to death. The consuls launched raids into the lands of the Veii, with Vibulanus winning a new victory against the Volsci and the Aequi. Instead of dividing the plunder amongst the soldiers, which was the traditional practice, Vibulanus offered all of it to the public treasury, which made him very unpopular among the people and the soldiers.

He later became flamen quirinalis, the flamen devotee in the cult of Quirinus, and held this title until 453 BC, the probable year of his death, during an epidemic of pestilence or typhus which also took the consul Sextus Quinctilius Varus and the consul suffect who replaced him, Spurius Furius Medullinus Fusus.

== Bibliography ==
=== Primary sources ===
- Livy, The History of Rome, Books II-III
- Dionysius of Halicarnassus, Roman Antiquities, Book X

=== Secondary sources ===
- Broughton, Thomas Robert Shannon (1951), The Magistrates of the Roman Republic, Philological Monograph No. 15, New York: American Philological Association, ISBN 0-89130-811-3
- Vanggaard, Jens H. (1988), The Flamen: A Study in the History and Sociology of Roman Religion, Museum Tusculanum Forlag, ISBN 9788772890593

Political offices
Preceded by Spurius Cassius Vecellinus; Proculus Verginius Tricostus Rutilus	Consul of the Roman Republic with Quintus Fabius Vibulanus; 485 BC	Succeeded by Caeso Fabius Vibulanus; Lucius Aemilius Mamercus
