= Titus Verginius Tricostus Rutilus =

5th-century BC Roman politician and general

Roman consul of the Roman Republic
- In office 479 BC – 479 BC Serving with Caeso Fabius Vibulanus
- Preceded by: Marcus Fabius Vibulanus, Gnaeus Manlius Cincinnatus
- Succeeded by: Lucius Aemilius Mamercus, Gaius Servilius Structus Ahala

Personal details
- Born: Unknown Roman Republic
- Died: 463 BC Roman Republic

Titus Verginius Tricostus Rutilus (died 463 BC), was consul of the Roman Republic in 479 BC. He held the office with Caeso Fabius Vibulanus.

According to Livy, he was assigned to fight in the Roman–Etruscan Wars between 483–476 BC with the Veii, but because of his temerity, his army was almost cut off, saved only by his colleague Fabius, marching from fighting the Aequi.

At an unknown point in his career, he was elected to the priesthood of the augurs. Verginius died in 463 BC during a pestilence that claimed, among others, both the consuls for that year.

His filiation suggests his father was Opiter Verginius Tricostus (consul in 502 BC) and that his brothers were Proculus Verginius Tricostus Rutilus (consul in 486 BC) and Aulus Verginius Tricostus Rutilus (consul in 476 BC), and possibly also Opiter Verginius Tricostus Esquilinus (suffect consul in 478 BC and possibly consul in 473 BC).

Political offices
Preceded by Marcus Fabius Vibulanus II, Gnaeus Manlius Cincinnatus	Consul of the Roman Republic; 479 BC with Caeso Fabius Vibulanus	Succeeded by Lucius Aemilius Mamercus II, Gaius Servilius Structus Ahala (consul 478 BC)
