= 492 BC =

492 BC in various calendars
- Gregorian calendar: 492 BC; CDXCII BC
- Ab urbe condita: 262
- Ancient Egypt era: XXVII dynasty, 34
- Pharaoh: Darius I of Persia, 30
- Ancient Greek Olympiad (summer): 72nd Olympiad (victor)¹
- Assyrian calendar: 4259
- Balinese saka calendar: N/A
- Bengali calendar: −1085 – −1084
- Berber calendar: 459
- Buddhist calendar: 53
- Burmese calendar: −1129
- Byzantine calendar: 5017–5018
- Chinese calendar: 戊申年 (Earth Monkey); 2206 or 1999 — to — 己酉年 (Earth Rooster); 2207 or 2000
- Coptic calendar: −775 – −774
- Discordian calendar: 675
- Ethiopian calendar: −499 – −498
- Hebrew calendar: 3269–3270
- Hindu calendars
- Vikram Samvat: −435 – −434
- Shaka Samvat: N/A
- Kali Yuga: 2609–2610
- Holocene calendar: 9509
- Iranian calendar: 1113 BP – 1112 BP
- Islamic calendar: 1147 BH – 1146 BH
- Javanese calendar: N/A
- Julian calendar: N/A
- Korean calendar: 1842
- Minguo calendar: 2403 before ROC 民前2403年
- Nanakshahi calendar: −1959
- Thai solar calendar: 51–52
- Tibetan calendar: ས་ཕོ་སྤྲེ་ལོ་ (male Earth-Monkey) −365 or −746 or −1518 — to — ས་མོ་བྱ་ལོ་ (female Earth-Bird) −364 or −745 or −1517

Year 492 BC was a year of the pre-Julian Roman calendar. At the time, it was known as the Year of the Consulship of Macerinus and Augurinus (or, less frequently, year 262 Ab urbe condita). The denomination 492 BC for this year has been used since the early medieval period, when the Anno Domini calendar era became the prevalent method in Europe for naming years.

== Events ==
=== By place ===
==== Greece ====
- The first expedition of King Darius I of Persia against Greece commences under the leadership of his son-in-law and general, Mardonius. Darius sends Mardonius to succeed his satrap (governor) in Ionia, Artaphernes, with a special commission to attack Athens and Eretria.
- The Persians under Mardonius subdue and capture Thrace and Macedonia.
- Mardonius loses some 300 ships in a storm off Mount Athos, which forces him to abandon his plans to attack Athens and Eretria.
- Tisicrates wins the stadion race for a second time at the 72nd Olympic Games.

==== Sicily ====
- When Camarina, a Syracusan colony, rebels, Hippocrates, the tyrant of Gela, intervenes to wage war against Syracuse. After defeating the Syracusan army at the Heloros River, he besieges the city. However, he is persuaded by the intervention of forces from the Greek mainland city of Corinth to retreat in exchange for the possession of Camarina.

==== Rome ====
- Following the conclusion of the secession of the plebs, a famine strikes Rome. The consuls avert the crisis by obtaining grain from Etruria.
- War with the Volsci is averted because a pestilence affects the Volsci. Rome sends additional colonists to Velitrae and establishes a new colony in Norba.
