= Gaius Horatius Pulvillus =

Roman senator and consul (died c.453 BC)

- Died: 453 BC
- Office: Consul (477, 457 BC)

Gaius Horatius Pulvillus (died c. 453 BC) was a Roman politician during the 5th century BC, who was consul in 477 and 457 BC.

== Family ==
Ancient sources disagree on his praenomen. Livy and Diodorus Siculus give Gaius for the year 477 BC, but Marcus for 457 BC; however the Fasti Capitolini and Dionysius of Halicarnassus give Gaius for both years. He was the son of Marcus Horatius Pulvillus, consul in 509 and 507 BC, and the grandson of a Marcus Horatius. His complete name is Gaius (or Marcus) Horatius M.f. M.n. Pulvillus.

== Biography ==
=== First consulship ===
In 477 BC, Gaius Horatius Pulvillus was elected consul with Titus Menenius Lanatus. (Note: Diodorus Siculus, Universal History XI. 17) The Roman Senate conferred to him management of the war against the Volsci while his colleague prepared to confront the Veientes. However, following the victories of Veii at the Battle of the Cremera and again against Menenius, Horatius was recalled to Rome, where the Veientes had occupied the Janiculum. He won a battle in Janiculum, but the success was insufficient in driving the Etruscans out - the war had to be continued by the consuls of the following year. (Note: Livy, Roman History, II. 51) (Note: Dionysius of Halicarnassus, Roman Antiquities, IX. 18-24)

=== Second consulship ===
In 457 BC, he was consul for the second time with Quintus Minucius Esquilinus. (Note: For the consuls of this year, only Diodorus Siculus gives two different names: Marcus Fabius Vibulanus and Lucius Quinctius Cincinnatus (see Diod., XII.2)) The tribunes of the plebs prevented the mobilisation of the army for the campaign against the Aequi, but finally gave in when the Sabines were found pillaging Roman fields. (Note: Livy, Roman History, III. 30) Horatius led Roman forces against the Aequi, while Minucius led forces against the Sabines. The number of tribunes was increased to ten this year, with one tradition giving Horatius a leading role in accomplishing this.

=== End of career ===
He later entered the college of the augurs. He died in 453 BC during a plague, (Note: Livy, Roman History, III. 32) or typhus which also took the consul Sextus Quinctilius Varus and the consul suffect Spurius Furius Medullinus Fusus who replaced him. (Note: Dionysius of Halicarnassus, X.53) Gaius Veturius Cicurinus succeeded Pulvillus within the college of augurs. (Note: Livy, Roman History, III. 32.3)

== Bibliography ==
=== Ancient authors ===
- Dionysius of Halicarnassus in Romaike Archaiologia books 9 and 10.
- Diodorus Siculus in Bibliotheca historica book 11.
- Titus Livius in Roman History book 3.

=== Modern authors ===
- Broughton, Thomas Robert Shannon (1951), The Magistrates of the Roman Republic, Philological Monograph No. 15, New York: American Philological Association, ISBN 0-89130-811-3
- Flobert, Annette (1995), Tite-Live, Histoire Romaine, livres I à V : traduction nouvelle (in French), Paris: Garnier-Flammarion

Political offices
Preceded by Lucius Aemilius Mamercus II; Gaius Servilius Structus Ahala	Roman consul 477 BC with Titus Menenius Lanatus	Succeeded by Aulus Verginius Tricostus Rutilus; Spurius Servilius Structus
Preceded by Gaius Nautius Rutilus; Lucius Minucius Esquilinus Augurinus	Roman consul II; 457 BC with Quintus Minucius Esquilinus	Succeeded by Marcus Valerius Maximus Lactuca; Spurius Verginius Tricostus Caeliomontanus
