= Opiter Verginius Tricostus Esquilinus =

Roman Republic suffectus consul in 478 BC

Suffectus Consul of the Roman Republic
- In office 478 BC – July 31 477 BC Serving with Lucius Aemilius Mamercus
- Preceded by: Caeso Fabius Vibulanus (consul), Gaius Servilius Structus Ahala (consul 478 BC)
- Succeeded by: Gaius Horatius Pulvillus, Titus Menenius Lanatus

Personal details
- Born: Unknown; Ancient Rome
- Died: Unknown; Ancient Rome

Opiter Verginius Tricostus Esquilinus is the reconstructed name of the consul suffectus who replaced Gaius Servilius Structus Ahala as consul of the Roman Republic in 478 BC. The fact of Servilius' death is not recorded by Livy (who only mentions Servilius when he takes the fasces), nor by Dionysius of Halicarnassus (who states that Servilius campaigned against the Volscians, but had no success). However the Fasti Capitolini states that Servilius died in office and was replaced by a man most of whose name is obliterated except for the cognomen "Esquilinus".

In discussing the identification of this consul suffectus, T. Robert S. Broughton notes that Bartolommeo Borghesi suggested the name may be "Opiter Verginius Tricostus Esquilinus", while Cichorius suggested his gentile name may be Sergius, which is often confused with Servilius. Cichorius also points out that the space on the Fasti Capitolini would not fit the entire name and filiation as Borghesi proposed. However, Broughton favors Verginius, assuming his name on the Fasti Capitolini included only his possible father in the filiation, Opiter Verginius Tricostus, the consul of 502 BC, and only one cognomen.

Regardless of these speculations, it is likely that Opiter Verginius existed and held the fasces at some point in the 5th century. In another passage, Livy names him as the colleague of Lucius Aemilius Mamercus, consul for the third time in 473 BC, while admitting other sources name Vopiscus Julius Iulus. The filiation of the unfortunate consular tribune of 402 BC, Lucius Verginius Tricostus Esquilinus, is recorded on the Fasti Capitolini as including one Opiter Verginius Tricostus Esquilinus who would have lived in the 470s BC.

== See also ==
- Verginia gens

Political offices
Preceded by Caeso Fabius Vibulanus, and Gaius Servilius Structus Ahala (consul 478 BC)	Consul of the Roman Republic; 478 BC with Lucius Aemilius Mamercus II	Succeeded by Gaius Horatius Pulvillus, and Titus Menenius Lanatus
