= Battle of the Cremera =

Part of the Roman–Etruscan Wars (477 BC)

- Part of the Roman–Etruscan Wars
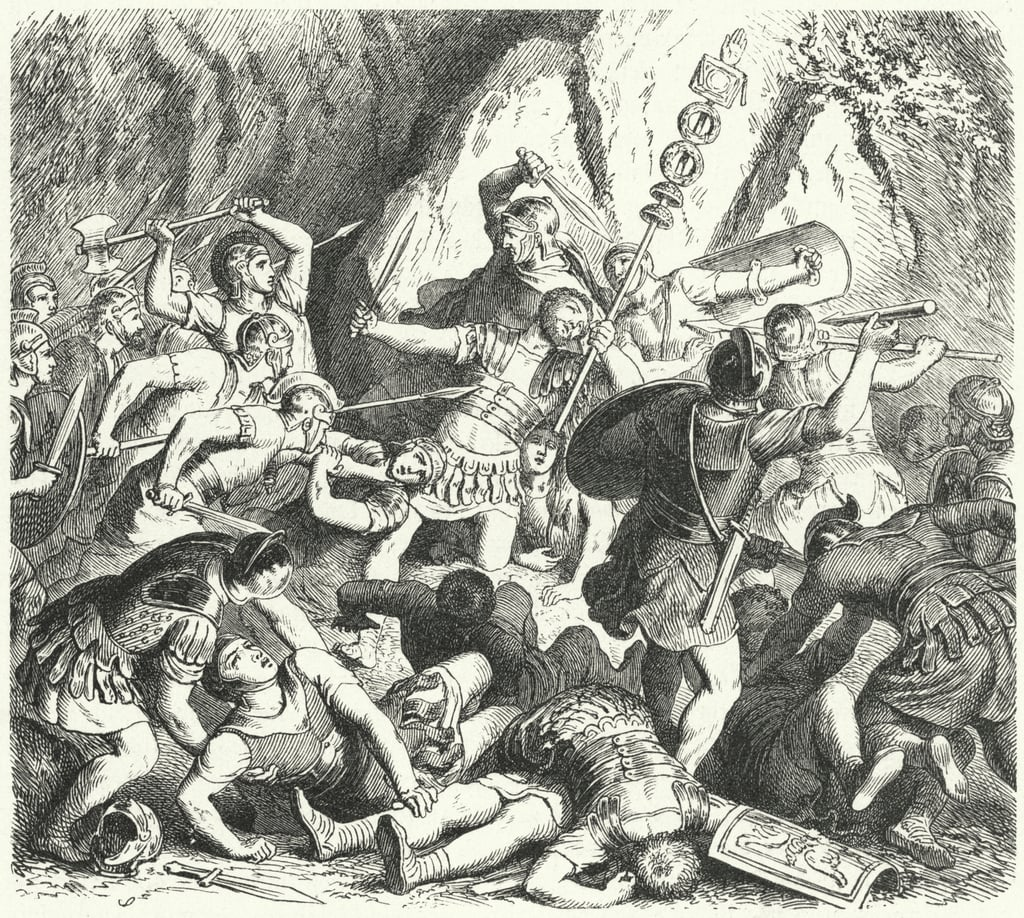
- Heinrich Leutemannː Downfall of the Roman gens Fabia at the Battle of the Cremera (engraving)
Date	477 BC
Location	Cremera, Italy 42°01′44″N 12°25′28″E
Result	Veientian (Etruscan) victory

Belligerents
Roman Republic	Etruscan city of Veii

Commanders and leaders
Caeso Fabius Vibulanus †; Marcus Fabius Vibulanus †	Unknown

Strength
306 men	Unknown

Casualties and losses
306 men	Unknown
- Location within Italy Battle of the Cremera (Mediterranean)

The Battle of the Cremera was fought between the Roman Republic and the Etruscan city of Veii, in 477 BC (AUC 277).

It most likely occurred on 18 July, although Ovid gives a different date of 13 February.

== Background ==
Since the overthrow of the Roman monarchy in 509 BC, the Roman Republic and its neighbour Veii had been at peace.

Conflict erupted, however, in 483 BC with a series of clashes that occurred almost annually. Rome was victorious in a close-fought battle in 480 BC; nevertheless, hostilities continued.

In 479 BC, the family of the Fabii offered to take the Roman responsibility for the war upon themselves, which the Roman senate accepted. The Fabii built a camp on the Cremera, from which they harassed Veii and held back its raids on Rome. The Fabii were successful in the fighting in 478 BC and 477 BC prior to the main battle which followed.

== Account of the battle ==
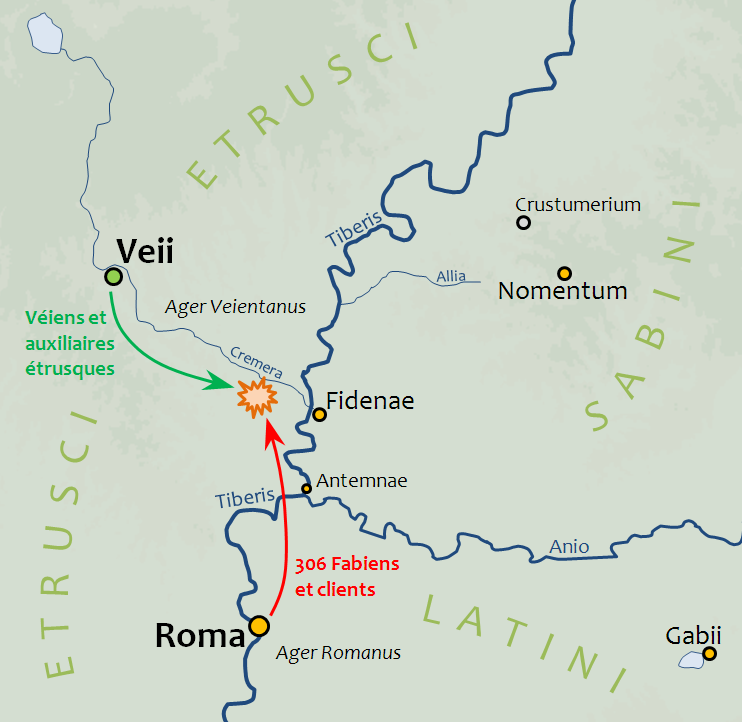
Battle of the Cremere, map

The Veientes, embarrassed by their lack of success, formed plans for an ambush of the Fabii. The Veientes led a herd of cattle along a road, at a distance from the Fabian camp at the Cremera, in order to lure the Romans from their camp and into an ambush. The Romans pursued the herd and scattered to capture the animals. At that point, the Veientes sprang from their hiding places and surrounded the Fabii. The Veientes were superior in number; however, the Romans formed a wedge formation, broke through and reached a hill, where they successfully repulsed the initial Veientine attacks, until some of the Veientes went around the Romans to attack them from the rear, uphill from the Romans.

All of the Fabii were slaughtered save Quintus Fabius Vibulanus, who was too young to be sent to war.

== Aftermath ==
Upon hearing of the grave defeat, the Roman Senate sent the consul Titus Menenius Lanatus with an army against the Veientes, but the Romans were defeated once again. The Veientes marched on Rome, and occupied the Janiculum. There were two indecisive battles against the Veientes, the first near the temple of Spes near the Praenestine Gate, and the second at the Colline Gate. Thereafter the Veientes withdrew from Rome and set about ravaging the countryside, until they were defeated by the Romans in the following year.
