= 440 BC =

440 BC in various calendars
| Gregorian calendar | 440 BC; CDXL BC |
| Ab urbe condita | 314 |
| Ancient Egypt era | XXVII dynasty, 86 |
| Pharaoh | Artaxerxes I of Persia, 26 |
| Ancient Greek Olympiad (summer) | 85th Olympiad (victor)¹ |
| Assyrian calendar | 4311 |
| Balinese saka calendar | N/A |
| Bengali calendar | −1033 – −1032 |
| Berber calendar | 511 |
| Buddhist calendar | 105 |
| Burmese calendar | −1077 |
| Byzantine calendar | 5069–5070 |
| Chinese calendar | 庚子年 (Metal Rat); 2258 or 2051 — to — 辛丑年 (Metal Ox); 2259 or 2052 |
| Coptic calendar | −723 – −722 |
| Discordian calendar | 727 |
| Ethiopian calendar | −447 – −446 |
| Hebrew calendar | 3321–3322 |
- Hindu calendars
| Vikram Samvat | −383 – −382 |
| Shaka Samvat | N/A |
| Kali Yuga | 2661–2662 |
| Holocene calendar | 9561 |
| Iranian calendar | 1061 BP – 1060 BP |
| Islamic calendar | 1094 BH – 1093 BH |
| Javanese calendar | N/A |
| Julian calendar | N/A |
| Korean calendar | 1894 |
| Minguo calendar | 2351 before ROC 民前2351年 |
| Nanakshahi calendar | −1907 |
| Thai solar calendar | 103–104 |
| Tibetan calendar | 阳金鼠年 (male Iron-Rat) −313 or −694 or −1466 — to — 阴金牛年 (female Iron-Ox) −312 or −693 or −1465 |

Year 440 BC was a year of the pre-Julian Roman calendar. At the time, it was known as the Year of the Consulship of Macerinus and Lanatus (or, less frequently, year 314 Ab urbe condita). The denomination 440 BC for this year has been used since the early medieval period, when the Anno Domini calendar era became the prevalent method in Europe for naming years.

== Events ==
=== By place ===
==== Greece ====
- Samos, an autonomous member of the Delian League and one of Athens' principal allies with a substantial fleet of its own, quarrels with Miletus. Miletus, also a member of the Delian League, appeals to Athens for assistance. Pericles decides in favour of Miletus, so Samos revolts. Pericles then sails to Samos with a fleet to overthrow its oligarchic government and install a democratic one. Sparta threatens to interfere. However, at a congress of the Peloponnesian League, its members vote not to intervene on behalf of Samos against Athens.

The Histories by Herodotus was written that contain the knowledge of the Greco Persian wars.

==== Roman Republic ====
- A famine strikes in Rome.

==== China ====
- Zhou Kao Wang becomes king of the Zhou dynasty of China.

=== By topic ===
==== Physics ====
- Democritus proposes the existence of indivisible particles, which he calls atoms.

==== Art ====
- Polykleitos completes one of his greatest statues, the Doryphorus (The Spear Bearer) (approximate date).
- The stela, Demeter, Persephone and Triptolemos, from Eleusis, is made (approximate date). It is now kept at the National Archaeological Museum of Athens.
- A temple for Poseidon is erected in Sounion.

== Births ==
- Cynisca, Greek princess of Sparta

== Deaths ==
- Ducetius, a Hellenized leader of the Sicels and founder of a united Sicilian state
- Ezra, Jewish scribe and priest (b. c. 480 BCE)
- Amestris, Achaemenid queen (approximate date)
