= Caeso Fabius Vibulanus =

5th-century BC Roman senator and consul

- Died: 477 BC
- Office: Consul (484, 481, 479 BC)

Caeso Fabius Vibulanus was consul of the Roman Republic in 484, 481, and 479 BC. He had earlier held the office of quaestor parricidii in 485 BC in connection with the trial and execution of Spurius Cassius Vecellinus.

For a seven-year period from 485 to 479 BC, one of the two consuls was a member of the gens Fabia, a domination of the office Gary Forsythe describes as "unparalleled in the consular fasti of the Roman Republic." His brothers were Quintus (consul in 485 and 482 BC) and Marcus (consul in 483 and 480 BC).

According to Livy, the plebs disliked the name of the Fabii on account of Caeso's brother Quintus who, as consul in 485 BC, had incurred the anger of the plebs by lodging the spoils of a victory with the publicum. However, Livy says, the senate succeeded in having Caeso elected in 484 BC notwithstanding. His election in that year stirred up the anger of the plebs even further. In that year Caeso and his colleague Lucius Aemilius Mamercus worked with the senate to oppose increases to the powers of the tribunes.

During Fabius' second consulship in 481 BC Fabius was given command of an army against the Aequi, who had laid siege to the Latin town of Ortona. Fabius and his army met the Aequi in battle, and routed them solely by a cavalry charge. However, due to popular discontent amongst the Roman army, both with the patricians and with Fabius himself, the Roman infantry refused to pursue the enemy. Fabius exhorted them to attack the fleeing enemy, but they refused, and returned to camp. Nevertheless, Fabius and the army returned to Rome victorious.

In his third consulship in 479 BC, Fabius sought to heal the discord between patricians and plebeians by proposing an agrarian law to distribute land won in recent wars amongst the plebs. The senate rejected the proposal.

In the same year the Aequi threatened the Latin territory, and Fabius was assigned an army to deal with the threat. No significant battle was fought, because the Aequi retreated to their walled towns. When word arrived that the other consul Titus Verginius Tricostus Rutilus was threatened by the Veientes, Fabius took his army to rescue his colleague.

In the same year the Fabii addressed the senate, proposing that their family alone bear the financial and military burden of the war with Veii. The senate agreed, with thanks, and the people extolled the name of the Fabii. The following day the Fabii armed themselves and, numbering 306 including the consul, marched through Rome and out of the right side of the Carmental Gate. Heading north, they set up camp at the Cremera and fortified a post.

According to Roman historical tradition, all of the male members of the gens Fabia except one perished in the Battle of the Cremera in 477 BC. If this tradition is correct, then Caeso died that year in the disaster.

Political offices
Preceded by Servius Cornelius Maluginensis; Quintus Fabius Vibulanus	Roman consul 484 BC; With: Lucius Aemilius Mamercus	Succeeded by Marcus Fabius Vibulanus; Lucius Valerius Potitus
Preceded by Gaius Julius Iullus; Quintus Fabius Vibulanus II	Roman consul II; 481 BC; With: Spurius Furius Medullinus Fusus	Succeeded by Marcus Fabius Vibulanus II; Gnaeus Manlius Cincinnatus
Preceded by Marcus Fabius Vibulanus II; Gnaeus Manlius Cincinnatus	Roman consul III; 479 BC; With: Titus Verginius Tricostus Rutilus	Succeeded by Lucius Aemilius Mamercus II; Gaius Servilius Structus Ahala
