= Lucius Aemilius Mamercus =

5th-century BC Roman consul

Consul of the Roman Republic
- In office 1 September 484 BC – 29 August 483 BC Serving with Caeso Fabius Vibulanus (consul)
- Preceded by: Servius Cornelius Maluginensis, Quintus Fabius Vibulanus (consul 485 BC)
- Succeeded by: Marcus Fabius Vibulanus (consul 483 BC), Lucius Valerius Potitus
- In office 1 August 478 BC – 31 July 477 BC Serving with Gaius Servilius Structus Ahala (consul 478 BC), Opiter Verginius Tricostus Esquilinus (consul 478 BC)
- Preceded by: Caeso Fabius Vibulanus (consul), Titus Verginius Tricostus Rutilus
- Succeeded by: Gaius Horatius Pulvillus,
- In office 1 August 473 BC – 31 July 472 BC Serving with Vopiscus Julius Iulus
- Preceded by: Lucius Furius Medullinus (consul 474 BC), Gnaeus Manlius Vulso
- Succeeded by: Lucius Pinarius Mamercinus Rufus (consul 472 BC), Publius Furius Medullinus Fusus

Personal details
- Born: Ancient Rome
- Died: Ancient Rome
- Children: Tiberius Aemilius Mamercinus

Lucius Aemilius Mamercus was a Roman statesman who served as consul three times: in 484, 478 and 473 BC.

In 484 BC, as consul, Aemilius led the Roman forces in battle against the Volsci and Aequi. The Romans were successful, and the Roman cavalry slaughtered many in the rout which followed.

Livy says that during his first consulship, Aemilius (together with his colleague Caeso Fabius Vibulanus) worked with the senate to oppose increases to the powers of the tribunes.

In 478 BC, Aemilius led a Roman army successfully against the Etruscans.

== See also ==
- Aemilia gens

Political offices
Preceded by Servius Cornelius Maluginensis, and Quintus Fabius Vibulanus	Consul of the Roman Republic; 484 BC with Caeso Fabius Vibulanus	Succeeded by Marcus Fabius Vibulanus, and Lucius Valerius Potitus
Preceded by Caeso Fabius Vibulanus III, and Titus Verginius Tricostus Rutilus	Consul of the Roman Republic; 478 BC with Gaius Servilius Structus Ahala	Succeeded by Gaius Horatius Pulvillus, and Titus Menenius Lanatus
Preceded by Lucius Furius Medullinus, and Gnaeus Manlius Vulso	Consul of the Roman Republic; 473 BC with Vopiscus Julius Iulus	Succeeded by Lucius Pinarius Mamercinus Rufus, and Publius Furius Medullinus Fusus
