= 473 BC =

473 BC in various calendars
- Gregorian calendar: 473 BC; CDLXXIII BC
- Ab urbe condita: 281
- Ancient Egypt era: XXVII dynasty, 53
- Pharaoh: Xerxes I of Persia, 13
- Ancient Greek Olympiad (summer): 76th Olympiad, year 4
- Assyrian calendar: 4278
- Balinese saka calendar: N/A
- Bengali calendar: −1066 – −1065
- Berber calendar: 478
- Buddhist calendar: 72
- Burmese calendar: −1110
- Byzantine calendar: 5036–5037
- Chinese calendar: 丁卯年 (Fire Rabbit); 2225 or 2018 — to — 戊辰年 (Earth Dragon); 2226 or 2019
- Coptic calendar: −756 – −755
- Discordian calendar: 694
- Ethiopian calendar: −480 – −479
- Hebrew calendar: 3288–3289
- Hindu calendars
- Vikram Samvat: −416 – −415
- Shaka Samvat: N/A
- Kali Yuga: 2628–2629
- Holocene calendar: 9528
- Iranian calendar: 1094 BP – 1093 BP
- Islamic calendar: 1128 BH – 1127 BH
- Javanese calendar: N/A
- Julian calendar: N/A
- Korean calendar: 1861
- Minguo calendar: 2384 before ROC 民前2384年
- Nanakshahi calendar: −1940
- Thai solar calendar: 70–71
- Tibetan calendar: མེ་མོ་ཡོས་ལོ་ (female Fire-Hare) −346 or −727 or −1499 — to — ས་ཕོ་འབྲུག་ལོ་ (male Earth-Dragon) −345 or −726 or −1498

Year 473 BC was a year of the pre-Julian Roman calendar. At the time, it was known as the Year of the Consulship of Mamercus and Iullus (or, less frequently, year 281 Ab urbe condita). The denomination 473 BC for this year has been used since the early medieval period, when the Anno Domini calendar era became the prevalent method in Europe for naming years.

== Events ==
=== By place ===
==== China ====
- The State of Wu is annexed by the State of Yue.

==== Japan ====
- The Hikawa Shrine is established in Saitama, Saitama.

== Deaths ==
- King Fuchai of Wu, the last king of Wu in Zhou dynasty, China
