= Marcus Fabius Vibulanus (consul 483 BC) =

Roman Republic consul in 483 BC and 480 BC

Consul of the Roman Republic
- In office 1 September 483 BC – 29 August 482 BC Serving with Lucius Valerius Potitus (consul in 483 and 470 BC)
- Preceded by: Lucius Aemilius Mamercus, Caeso Fabius Vibulanus (consul)
- Succeeded by: Quintus Fabius Vibulanus (consul 485 BC), Spurius Furius Medullinus Fusus (consul 481 BC)
- In office 1 September 480 BC – 29 August 479 BC Serving with Gnaeus Manlius Cincinnatus
- Preceded by: Caeso Fabius Vibulanus (consul), Spurius Furius Medullinus Fusus (consul 481 BC)
- Succeeded by: Caeso Fabius Vibulanus (consul), Titus Verginius Tricostus Rutilus

Personal details
- Born: Unknown Ancient Rome
- Died: 477 BC Ancient Rome
- Children: Quintus Fabius Vibulanus

Marcus Fabius Vibulanus was consul of the Roman Republic in 483 and 480 BC.

For a seven-year period from 485 to 478 BC, one of the two consuls was a member of the gens Fabia, a domination of the office Gary Forsythe describes as "unparalleled in the consular fasti of the Roman Republic." His brothers were Quintus (consul in 485 and 482 BC) and Kaeso (consul in 484, 481, and 479 BC). According to the recorded filiation of his son, Marcus' father's praenomen was Caeso Fabius.

Livy states that during Marcus Fabius' first consulship in 483 BC there were attempts, continued from previous years, by the tribunes to increase their powers, which were successfully resisted by the Roman Senate.

In his second consulship, his colleague was Gnaeus Manlius Cincinnatus. That year, Rome was rent by internal dissension, which encouraged the Veientes to take the field in the hope of breaking Roman power. They were supported by troops from other Etruscan cities.

The consuls, mindful of the undisciplined conduct of the soldiers in the recent past, held their men back from fighting until repeated provocations by the Etruscan cavalry made the start of combat inevitable. Fabius compelled those of the soldiers who were most eager to engage the enemy to swear to return victorious, before he would give the order for battle. A centurion, Marcus Flavoleius, was the first to swear the oath, upon the anger of Jove and Mars Gradivus, and thereafter the oath was repeated by the entire army. Once the fight had begun, the Roman commanders fought with great vigor, particularly after Quintus Fabius, the brother of the consul, was slain. Marcus Fabius and his brother Kaeso leapt over their brother's slain body, and exhorted the Romans to continue the fight. Manlius, leading the army's opposite wing, was dangerously wounded and forced to retire from the line. As his men began to fall back in disarray, Manlius' colleague Fabius arrived to prevent their slaughter and assure them that their leader was not dead. Manlius was able to appear himself and reassure the soldiers.

The Etruscans took advantage of a lull in the fighting to attack the Roman camp, breaching the defenses of the reserves. However, word of the attack reached the consuls, and Manlius stationed his men around the exits to the camp, surrounding the Etruscans. Desperate to make their escape, the invaders assaulted the consul's position, and after a volley of missiles was repulsed, a final charge overwhelmed Manlius, who fell mortally wounded. The Roman troops again began to panic, but one of the fallen consul's officers moved his body and cleared a way for the Etruscans to escape, allowing Fabius to crush them as they fled.

Although the battle was a great victory for Fabius, the loss of his brother and his colleague was a severe blow, and he declined the honor of a triumph that had been offered by the Senate.

Fabius gave the eulogy at the funerals of his brother and of Manlius. Thereafter, he earned the affection of the people by distributing the wounded troops among the households of the patricians to be cared for as they healed.

According to Roman historical tradition, all of the male members of the gens Fabia except one perished in the Battle of the Cremera in 477 BC. If this tradition is correct, then Marcus died that year in the disaster. Tradition identifies the sole survivor as his son Quintus Fabius Vibulanus, who was too young to go to war.

Political offices
Preceded by Lucius Aemilius Mamercus; Caeso Fabius Vibulanus	Consul of the Roman Republic with Lucius Valerius Potitus; 483 BC	Succeeded by Quintus Fabius Vibulanus II; Spurius Furius Medullinus Fusus
Preceded by Caeso Fabius Vibulanus II; Spurius Furius Medullinus Fusus (consul 481 BC)	Consul of the Roman Republic with Gnaeus Manlius Cincinnatus; 480 BC	Succeeded by Caeso Fabius Vibulanus III; Titus Verginius Tricostus Rutilus
