= Proculus Verginius Tricostus Rutilus =

Roman statesman, consul in 486 BC

Proculus Verginius Tricostus Rutilus was an ancient Roman statesman who served as consul.

From his filiation, it appears likely that he was the son of Opiter Verginius Tricostus (consul 502 BC) and the brother of Titus Verginius Tricostus Rutilus (consul 479 BC), Opiter Verginius Tricostus Esquilinus (suffect consul 478 BC), and Aulus Verginius Tricostus Rutilus (consul 476 BC).

== Consulship ==
In 486 BC Proculus Verginius Tricostus Rutilus and Spurius Cassius Vecellinus were elected Consul. Verginius marched against the Aequi and opposed the agrarian law of his colleague Cassius.

Cassius was accused of trying to create support in the populace and allies to seek kingship. In a partisan struggle, Verginius sided with the Roman patricians, and Cassius the Roman plebeians. Upon retirement from office, Cassius was condemned and put to death.

== Notes ==
Political offices
| Preceded by Titus Sicinius Sabinus and Gaius Aquillius Tuscus | Consul of the Roman Republic with Spurius Cassius Vecellinus III; 486 BC | Succeeded by Servius Cornelius Maluginensis Cossus and Quintus Fabius Vibulanus |
