= Spurius Furius Fusus =

Roman statesman, consul in 481 BC

Spurius Furius Fusus (fl. c. 481–478 BC) was a Roman statesman from the early Republic, who served as consul in 481 BC alongside Caeso Fabius Vibulanus. During their term of office, the consuls campaigned against the Aequi and Veientes. Sources disagree on which consul fought which enemy: Livy says Furius had charge of the Veientes, but Dionysius of Halicarnassus puts him against the Aequi.

According to Dionysius, one "Servius Furius", generally identified as Spurius Furius, won a victory in 478 BC against the Aequi, but this event is not reported by Livy, and Münzer considers the notice to be of no historical value.

Preceded by Gaius Julius Iullus; Quintus Fabius Vibulanus	Roman consul 481 BC; With: Caeso Fabius Vibulanus	Succeeded by Marcus Fabius Vibulanus; Gnaeus Manlius Cincinnatus
