= Gnaeus Manlius Cincinnatus =

Roman general, consul in 480 BC

Consul of the Roman Republic
- In office 15 March 480 BC – 480 BC Serving with Marcus Fabius Vibulanus (consul 483 BC)
- Preceded by: Caeso Fabius Vibulanus (consul), Spurius Furius Medullinus Fusus (consul 481 BC)
- Succeeded by: Caeso Fabius Vibulanus (consul), Titus Verginius Tricostus Rutilus

Personal details
- Born: Unknown; Ancient Rome
- Died: 480 BC; Ancient Rome

Gnaeus Manlius Cincinnatus was the first of the patrician gens Manlia to obtain the consulship, which he held in 480 BC, together with Marcus Fabius Vibulanus. His father's name was Publius.

That year, Rome was rent by internal dissension, which encouraged the Veientes to take the field in the hope of breaking Roman power. They were supported by troops from other Etruscan cities.

The consuls, mindful of the undisciplined conduct of the soldiers in the recent past, held their men back from fighting until repeated provocations by the Etruscan cavalry made the start of combat inevitable. The consul Fabius compelled those of the soldiers who were most eager to engage the enemy to swear to return victorious, before he would give the order for battle. Once the fight had begun, the Roman commanders fought with great vigor, particularly after Quintus Fabius, the brother of the consul, was slain. Manlius, leading the army's opposite wing, was dangerously wounded and forced to retire from the line. As his men began to fall back in disarray, Manlius' colleague Fabius arrived to prevent their slaughter and assure them that their leader was not dead. Manlius was able to appear himself and reassure the soldiers.

The Etruscans took advantage of a lull in the fighting to attack the Roman camp, breaching the defenses of the reserves. However, word of the attack reached the consuls, and Manlius stationed his men around the exits to the camp, surrounding the Etruscans. Desperate to make their escape, the invaders assaulted the consul's position, and after a volley of missiles was repulsed, a final charge overwhelmed Manlius, who fell mortally wounded. The Roman troops again began to panic, but one of the fallen consul's officers moved his body and cleared a way for the Etruscans to escape, allowing Fabius to crush them as they fled.

Although the battle was a great victory for Fabius, the loss of his brother and his colleague was a severe blow, and he declined the honor of a triumph that had been offered by the Senate.

Fabius gave the eulogy at the funerals of his brother and of Manlius.

== See also ==
- Manlia (gens)

Political offices
Preceded by Kaeso Fabius Vibulanus and Spurius Furius Medullinus Fusus (consul 481 BC)	Consul of the Roman Republic with Marcus Fabius Vibulanus (consul 483 BC); 480 BC	Succeeded by Caeso Fabius Vibulanus and Titus Verginius Tricostus Rutilus
