= Titus Menenius Lanatus (consul 477 BC) =

Roman senator and general (died 476 BC)

- Died: 476 BC
- Office: Consul (477 BC)
- Children: Lucius and Agrippa

Titus Menenius Lanatus (died 476 BC) was a Roman patrician who was elected consul for the year 477 BC. He unsuccessfully fought the Veiientes, and was later prosecuted by the tribunes of the plebs for his failure to prevent the disaster of the Cremera.

== Family ==
Menenius was the son of Agrippa Menenius Lanatus, who was consul in 503 BC, and the grandson of Gaius Menenius. He was the father of Lucius Menenius Lanatus, consul in 440 BC and Agrippa Menenius Lanatus, the consul of 439 and consular tribune in 419 and 417.

== Life ==
Menenius was consul in 477 BC, together with Gaius Horatius Pulvillus. The Senate entrusted the conduct of the war against Veii to him, in support of the Fabia gens, who were guarding the frontier against the Etruscan city, while his colleague prepared to face the Volscians.

When the Fabii were ambushed at the Cremera, Menenius failed to intervene, although his forces were close enough to turn the tide without losing the strategic position. Not only were the Fabii destroyed and their position lost, but the Veientes continued toward Rome, where they defeated Menenius and occupied the Janiculum. Horatius Pulvillus was recalled in haste to defend the city. While Horatius won a first battle on the Janiculum against the Veientes, it was the consuls of the following year who were able to defeat the enemy and drive them out of Roman territory.

In 476 BC, after he had left office, Menenius was prosecuted by the tribunes Quintus Considius and Titus Genucius, ostensibly for his conduct of military operations during his consulate, in particular for allowing the gens Fabia to be slaughtered. However, Livy points out that the prosecution may have been motivated more by his opposition to the agrarian law that the plebeians had been calling for since the death of Spurius Cassius Vecellinus in 486. He was defended by the Senate as strenuously as they defended Coriolanus a few years earlier and was helped by the reputation of his father, who was popular for having reconciled the plebeians and patricians after the first secession of the plebs.

According to Livy, Menenius was able to avoid the death penalty or exile and was fined 2000 asses; but unable to bear his humiliation, Menenius soon fell sick and died. However, Cassius Dio reports that Menenius was sentenced to death by the court (likely based on ancient sources that still use the term "lender" to mean a consul).

== See also ==
- Menenia gens

Political offices
Preceded by Lucius Aemilius Mamercus II; Gaius Servilius Structus Ahala	Roman consul 477 BC with Gaius Horatius Pulvillus	Succeeded by Aulus Verginius Tricostus Rutilus; Spurius Servilius Structus
