= Ortona, Latium =

Town in ancient Latium in present-day central Italy

Ortona was a town in ancient Latium in central Italy.

Livy records that in 481 BC the Aequi laid siege to Ortona.
