= Quintus Fabius Vibulanus (consul 485 BC) =

Consul of the Roman Republic

Quintus Fabius Vibulanus (died 480 BC) was an aristocrat of the Early Roman Republic. He was the first of three brothers to hold the consulate, in both 485 and 482 BC.

For a seven-year period from 485 to 478 BC, one of the two consuls was a member of the gens Fabia, a domination of the office Gary Forsythe describes as "unparalleled in the consular fasti of the Roman Republic." His brothers were Kaeso (consul in 484, 481, and 479 BC) and Marcus (consul in 483 and 480 BC).

During his first consulship, Quintus defeated the Volsci and Aequi in battle, but incurred the anger of the plebs by lodging the spoils of victory with the publicum.

In his second consulship there were further hostilities with each of the Volsci and Aequi.

According to Dionysius of Halicarnassus, Quintus was killed in battle fighting against the Etruscans.

Political offices
| Preceded by Spurius Cassius Vecellinus; Proculus Verginius Tricostus Rutilus | Consul of the Roman Republic with Servius Cornelius Maluginensis; 485 BC | Succeeded by Caeso Fabius Vibulanus; Lucius Aemilius Mamercus |
| Preceded by Marcus Fabius Vibulanus; Lucius Valerius Potitus | Consul of the Roman Republic with Gaius Julius Iulus; 482 BC | Succeeded by Caeso Fabius Vibulanus; Spurius Furius Medullinus Fusus |
