= Cincinnatus (disambiguation) =

Cincinnatus may refer to:

People

- A number of ancient Romans named Cincinnatus (see Quinctii Cincinnati), especially:
  - The Roman patriot Lucius Quinctius Cincinnatus (consul 460 BC)
- Augustus Cincinnatus Hand (1803–1878), American jurist and politician
- David Washington Cincinnatus Olyphant (1789–1851), American trader
- Cincinnatus D'Abreo (1862–1929), Portuguese administrator and politician
- Cincinnatus Heine Miller (1837–1913), real name of Joaquin Miller, American poet and frontiersman
- Cincinnatus Leconte (1854–1912), President of Haiti
- Cincinnatus Powell (1942–2023), American basketball player
- Cincinnatus Shryock (1816–1888), American architect
- Lucius Quintius Cincinnatus Elmer (1793–1883), American politician
- Lucius Quintus Cincinnatus Lamar I (1797–1834), American attorney and jurist
- Lucius Quintus Cincinnatus Lamar II (1825–1893), American politician and Confederate soldier
- Lamar Quintus Cincinnatus Williams (1881–1934), American politician
- Secret correspondence name of NSA contractor and whistleblower Edward Snowden

Fictional characters

- Cincinnatus, an innkeeper played by Dallas McKennon on the 1964-70 TV series Daniel Boone
- Cincinnatus C., the protagonist of the Vladimir Nabokov novel Invitation to a Beheading

Organizations

- Society of the Cincinnati, a patriotic society founded by soldiers of the American Revolution, based on the ideals of Cincinnatus
- New Order of Cincinnatus, political organization founded in Seattle in the 1930s
- Cincinnatus Honorary Society, an honorary organization founded at the University of Cincinnati

Places

- Cincinnatus, New York

Other

- Cincinnatus (mural), a public mural in Cincinnati, Ohio, United States

== See also ==
- Cincinnati (disambiguation)
- Cincinnato (disambiguation)
