= Lucius Lucretius Tricipitinus =

5th-century BC Roman senator and consul

Consul of the Roman Republic
- In office 1 August 462 BC – 31 July 461 BC Serving with Titus Veturius Geminus Cicurinus (consul 462 BC)
- Preceded by: Publius Servilius Priscus Structus (consul 463 BC), Lucius Aebutius Helva
- Succeeded by: Publius Volumnius Amintinus Gallus, Servius Sulpicius Camerinus Cornutus (consul 461 BC)

Personal details
- Born: Unknown Ancient Rome
- Died: Unknown Ancient Rome

Lucius Lucretius Tricipitinus was a Roman senator in the fifth century BC, and was consul with Titus Veturius Geminus Cicurinus in 462 BC.

== Family ==
Tricipitinus was the son of a Titus Lucretius, and grandson of Titus Lucretius Tricipitinus, consul in 508 and 504 BC. His complete name was Lucius Lucretius T.f. T.n. Tricipitinus.

== Biography ==
=== Consulship ===
In 462 BC, he was elected consul with Titus Veturius Geminus Cicurinus. The Romans recovered from a severe epidemic that occurred the year before and had taken the two consuls Publius Servilius Priscus Structus and Lucius Aebutius Helva, the augurs Titus Verginius Tricostus Rutilus and Manius Valerius Volusus Maximus, and the Curio Maximus Servius Sulpicius Camerinus Cornutus. Before the end of his consulship, a series of interreges were nominated in order to organize new elections. This they conducted during the term of the interrex, Publius Valerius Poplicola in 462 BC.

=== War against the Aequi and the Volsci ===
The Aequi and Volsci attempted to take advantage of the consequences of the epidemic and attacked the territories of Rome and the Hernici. Geminus easily put the Volsci to flight while Lucius Lucretius inflicted a serious defeat against the pillagers, recovering the loot that they had taken from Roman territory. For these victories, Lucius Lucretius was given the honor of celebrating a triumph and Geminus was given an Ovation.

==== The rogatio Terentilia ====
When the consuls were absent from Rome, leading their armies in campaign against the Aequi and the Volsci, Terentilius, tribune of the plebs, proposed a law creating a special commission charged with regulating consular power. Quintus Fabius Vibulanus, named Praefectus urbi in absence of the consuls, opposed drafting the law and deferred the vote until the return of the consuls.

=== The trial of Kaeso Quinctius ===
The following year, in 461 BC, Tricipitinus intervened in support of the young politician, Caeso Quinctius, who was accused by the plebeian tribunes Aulus Verginius and Marcus Volscius Fictor of undermining the sacrosanctness of their office and murder.

=== Later career ===
Lucretius was himself appointed Praefectus urbi in 459 BC, most likely because both consuls Quintus Fabius Vibulanus and Lucius Cornelius Maluginensis Uritinus, were occupied with wars against the Aequi and Volsci.

== Bibliography ==
=== Ancient bibliography ===
- Dionysius of Halicarnassus, Roman Antiquities, Book IX
- Livy, The History of Rome, Book III

=== Modern bibliography ===
- Broughton, T. Robert S. (1951), "The Magistrates of the Roman Republic", Philological Monographs, number XV, volume I, vol. I, 509 B.C. - 100 B.C., New York: The American Philological Association
- Briquel, Dominique (2000), "La nuit du V^{e} siècle", Roman History. Tome I, Des origines à Auguste (in French), pp. 163–202, ISBN 978-2-213-03194-1

Political offices
| Preceded by Publius Servilius Priscus Structus, Lucius Aebutius Helva | Consul of the Roman Republic; 462 BC with Titus Veturius Geminus Cicurinus | Succeeded by Publius Volumnius Amintinus Gallus, Servius Sulpicius Camerinus Cornutus |
