= Volumnia (disambiguation) =

Volumnia is a character in Shakespeare's Coriolanus

Volumnia may also refer to:

- Volumnia (wife of Coriolanus), historical person in ancient Rome
- Volumnia gens, ancient Roman family
- Volumnia, former genus of beetle:

- Volumnia apicalis , now known as Glenea apicalis
- Volumnia leucomelaena , now known as Glenea morosa

- Volumnia Cytheris, slave in Ancient Rome
- Volumnia Dedlock, character in Dickens' Bleak House
