= Gaius Claudius Sabinus Regillensis =

Roman senator, consul in 460 BC

Gaius Claudius Ap. f. M. n. Sabinus Regillensis

Consul of the Roman Republic
- In office 1 August 460 BC – 31 July 459 BC Serving with Publius Valerius Poplicola (consul 475 BC)
- Preceded by: Publius Volumnius Amintinus Gallus, Servius Sulpicius Camerinus Cornutus (consul 461 BC)
- Succeeded by: Quintus Fabius Vibulanus, Lucius Cornelius Maluginensis Uritinus

Personal details
- Born: Unknown Ancient Rome
- Died: Unknown Ancient Rome

Gaius Claudius Ap. f. M. n. Sabinus Regillensis (or Inregillensis), (Note: This surname is supposedly derived from the Sabine town of Regillum or Inregillum, where the first of the Claudii is said to have lived before coming to Rome. Most ancient sources refer to it as Regillum, rather than Inregillum. Its name is probably connected with that of Lake Regillus.) was a member of the great patrician house of the Claudii at Ancient Rome. He held the consulship in 460 BC.

== Family ==
Gaius was the younger son of Attius Clausus, a wealthy Sabine merchant who emigrated to Rome with a large following in 504 BC, and was admitted to the patriciate under the name of Appius Claudius Sabinus. The elder Claudius became a senator, and held the consulship in 495; he distinguished himself as the leading figure in the aristocratic party, and the fiercest opponent of the plebeians. He had at least two sons: Appius, who was consul in 471, and Gaius, who held the same magistracy in 460.

Almost nothing is known of Gaius Claudius' private life, except for his attachment to his nephew, (Note: The ancient historians consistently describe the decemvir Appius Claudius as Gaius' nephew, and therefore the son of the Appius Claudius who was consul in 471 BC. However, in the Capitoline Fasti the decemvir is apparently identified with the consul of 471, making him Gaius' brother. Although they were probably father and son, many scholars accept that they were the same person.) Appius Claudius Crassus, the decemvir, whom he advised and subsequently defended following the overthrow of the decemvirate.

== Career ==
Elected consul in 460 with Publius Valerius Poplicola, Claudius and his colleague first had to contend with continuing arguments between Rome's aristocratic and popular interests, concerning a proposal to strictly limit the powers of the consuls. This measure had been brought forward two years earlier by Gaius Terentilius Arsa, one of the tribunes of the plebs; but its consideration had been twice postponed, first at the request of Quintus Fabius Vibulanus, the praefectus urbi, who argued that it was treasonous to consider such a law when both consuls were out of the city, and persuaded Terentilius' colleagues to intervene. The following year the law was tabled again following strange omens (Note: "The year was marked by ominous signs: fires blazed in the sky, there was a violent earthquake, and a cow talked — there was a rumour that a cow had talked the previous year, but nobody believed it: this year they did. Nor was this all: it rained lumps of meat. Thousands of birds (we are told) seized and devoured the pieces in mid-air, while what fell to the ground lay scattered about for several days without going putrid.") and a deadlock over a levy of troops by the consuls, followed by the excitement of the trial of Caeso Quinctius Cincinnatus.

Rumours of all kinds flew, none more serious than that Caeso Quinctius, who had fled into exile the previous year, had returned to the city at the head of a conspiracy of young noblemen, intent on the murder of the tribunes of the people, and any others who had opposed the aristocratic party. There was even a rumour that the conspirators were to be aided by the Aequi and the Volsci. Aulus Verginius, the tribune who had brought charges against Caeso, demanded an investigation to put down the conspiracy, before the liberty of the Roman people could be stolen away. But Claudius gave a speech opposing any such investigation, asserting not only that the rumours were false, but that the tribunes themselves were responsible for them, as an excuse to banish other young aristocrats in the same manner that they had Quinctius.

=== Revolt of Herdonius ===
The attention of the city was soon diverted when an army of 2,500 slaves and exiles, headed by a Sabine named Appius Herdonius, seized control of the Capitol under cover of darkness, in an attempt to start a slave revolt. At first, the tribunes of the plebs felt that the subsequent call to arms was being used as another excuse to delay consideration of Terentilius' law, and attempted to block the levy; then the Senate treated the tribunes, rather than the occupying force on the Capitol, as its primary threat. The consul Valerius delivered a sharp rebuke to both sides for failing to treat the situation with the gravity it deserved, and reminding the tribunes of his father's role in establishing the Republic and protecting the rights of the people, he defied them to oppose him.

Before Valerius was ready to assault the Capitol, he was joined by a force of Tusculan soldiers sent by Lucius Mamilius, the dictator of Tusculum, to assist the Romans. While Claudius maintained a watch from the city walls for the approach of further enemies, Valerius and the Tusculans attacked and defeated the occupying army, although both the consul and Herdonius were slain in the fighting. Once peace was restored, the tribunes of the plebs asked once again for a hearing on Terentilius' legislation, which Valerius had promised them. However, Claudius refused to allow discussion of the law until Valerius had been replaced as consul, so the matter remained unresolved until after the elections. The law was never passed, but was probably one of the factors leading to the appointment of the decemvirs, with the goal of drawing up the tables of Roman law.

=== Further opposition to the plebeians ===
Three years after his consulship, in 457 BC, Roman territory was invaded by the Sabines, and an Aequian army took the towns of Corbio and Ortona. The Senate directed the consuls, Gaius Horatius Pulvillus and Quintus Minucius Esquilinus, to levy troops and take the field. However, the tribunes of the plebs, whose attempts to bring about various reforms had been continually frustrated and postponed in the face of one crisis or another, opposed the levy until their legislation could be taken up. The consul Horatius opposed the tribunes for staying the hand of the state at such an inopportune time, and seemed to sway public opinion; but the tribune Verginius asked that if the tribunes agreed to the levy, then the Senate should at least consider another measure to benefit the people of Rome.

Horatius agreed, and Verginius put forward his proposal: that the number of the plebeian tribunes should be doubled from five to ten. Gaius Claudius spoke in opposition to this measure, since in his opinion five tribunes were bad enough; ten should be unbearable, and would only increase the agitation for this concession or that. Lucius Quinctius Cincinnatus, whose son Verginius had forced into exile, nonetheless spoke in support of the proposal, reasoning that a greater number of tribunes would be less likely to agree on a course of action, and thus less troublesome than before. Cincinnatus' opinion prevailed, and the number of tribunes was increased to ten.

The following year, the tribune Lucius Icilius sought to have the Aventine Hill given to the plebeians for building houses. When the consuls continually postponed calling the Senate, Icilius sent one of his attendants to demand their attendance. They sent a lictor to drive away the attendant, but the tribunes seized the lictor and threatened to throw him from the Tarpeian Rock. A delegation of older senators persuaded them to release the man, and the Senate assembled. Icilius proposed his law, and along with it that land which had been fraudulently seized or taken by force should also be returned to the people. This would, he reasoned, ease the pressure for a distribution of land outside the city, which was strongly opposed by the large landowners. Gaius Claudius again spoke in opposition to the bill, but the Senate agreed to the measure, which was soon passed into law.

=== The Decemvirate ===
In 451 BC, a council of ten distinguished Romans of consular rank (Note: Men who had held the consulship were known as consulares, or "consulars".) was appointed in place of the consuls, for the purpose of drawing up tables of Roman law, based on a combination of ancient traditions and Greek models. One of the decemvirs was Gaius' nephew, Appius Claudius Crassus. In their first year, the decemvirs published ten tables of laws, to the general approval of the people. Since the task for which the decemvirate had been created remained incomplete, it was decided to elect a new college of decemvirs for the following year. Although Appius had affected a mild and agreeable demeanor, and won the trust of the plebeians, his colleagues suspected that he might wish to remain in power, and accordingly, they appointed him to name the new college, and resigned their office to set an example.

Instead of resigning, Appius appointed himself decemvir for 450, and surrounded himself with like-minded men and those whom he could easily dominate, deliberately excluding other prominent Roman statesmen, such as Cincinnatus, his brother, Titus Quinctius Capitolinus, or Gaius Claudius. The second college of decemvirs quickly earned a reputation for high-handedness and a Claudian disdain for the common people, publishing two more tables of law containing harsh restrictions on the plebeians. They then dispensed with the elections, continuing in office the following year. When a military emergency required them to convene the Senate, several prominent senators took advantage of the opportunity to criticize the unconstitutional nature of the decemvirs' authority. Gaius Claudius urged the Senate not to take action against the decemvirs, but he also warned his nephew to act in the best interest of his country, and not to abuse the power he held at the cost of the people's liberty.

Gaius' advice to his nephew was ignored, and seeing that any further actions on his part would be futile, he withdrew from Rome, taking up residence at Regillum, his family's ancestral home. Within the year, the decemvirs' arrogance led to their downfall. Appius was disgraced and taken into custody after trying to claim Verginia, the daughter of Lucius Verginius, a notable centurion, as his slave. Gaius returned to Rome to defend his nephew, whom he described as a great man, who would be well-remembered for his contributions to Roman law by future generations, whatever his faults might have been. Nevertheless, he could not prevent Appius from being brought to trial, and his nephew took his own life rather than answer for his crimes.

When the new consuls, Lucius Valerius Potitus and Marcus Horatius Barbatus, applied to the Senate for a triumph after delivering the city from its enemies, Gaius adamantly opposed their request. They had been the leading critics of the decemvirs, whom Gaius had opposed before his nephew's disgrace. Now he accused them of having betrayed the decemvirs into the hands of the plebeian tribunes, after having promised them amnesty, and claimed that his nephew had not taken his own life, but had been murdered by the tribunes before he could be tried and the falsity of the charges against him demonstrated. Gaius and his supporters carried the day, and the Senate denied the consuls' application for a triumph; but Valerius and Horatius took their case to the people, who gave them a triumph in spite of the Senate's refusal.

=== Post-decemvirate ===
Four years after the fall of the decemvirs, in 445 BC, Gaius Claudius again headed the Senatorial opposition to the plebeian tribunes. The tribune Gaius Canuleius proposed a law rescinding the prohibition of intermarriage between patricians and plebeians, which had been enacted by the second decemvirate. Together with eight of his nine colleagues, Canuleius also proposed allowing members of either class to be elected consul. The Senate called for a levy of troops to meet several potential military threats, but the tribunes would not permit the levy to go forward until their measures were considered. Canuleius was able to convince the Senate to support the repeal of the decemvirs' law, and the lex Canuleia restored the right of connubium between patricians and plebeians.

But Claudius and his supporters would not permit plebeians to be elected to the consulship, and urged that force be employed against the tribunes if they refused to abandon the proposal. Once again, he was opposed by Cincinnatus and his brother, who strongly disapproved of any suggestion that the Senate violate the sanctity of the tribunes. Finally the Senators proposed a compromise; according to Dionysius, Claudius himself suggested it: the consular authority would be shared by three military tribunes, who could be elected from either order. This proved acceptable to the people, and accordingly the first consular tribunes were elected for the year 444.

The establishment of the consular tribunes did not resolve the struggle of the plebeians to obtain the consulship, but postponed the crisis by which it was resolved by nearly seventy years. From 444 to 376 BC, consular tribunes were regularly elected instead of consuls, the choice often depending on the degree of harmony between patricians and plebeians from year to year. Although the office was theoretically open to plebeians, most of the consular tribunes elected before 400 BC were patricians. (Note: According to Livy, the first plebeians to hold the office did so in 400 BC; but the colleges of 444 and 422 also include names that are generally considered plebeian.) The consulship was finally opened to the plebeians by the lex Licinia Sextia in 367 BC, after the tribunes of the plebs had prevented the election of any magistrates for nine consecutive years.

== See also ==
- Claudia (gens)

== Bibliography ==
- Titus Livius (Livy), Ab Urbe Condita (History of Rome).
- Gaius Suetonius Tranquillus, De Vita Caesarum (Lives of the Caesars, or The Twelve Caesars).
- Dionysius of Halicarnassus, Romaike Archaiologia.
- Barthold Georg Niebuhr, The History of Rome, Julius Charles Hare and Connop Thirlwall, trans., John Smith, Cambridge (1828).
- "Gaius Claudius Sabinus Regillensis" (no. 3) in the Dictionary of Greek and Roman Biography and Mythology, William Smith, ed., Little, Brown, and Company, Boston (1849).
- Dictionary of Greek and Roman Antiquities, William Smith, ed., Little, Brown, and Company, Boston (1859).
- Harper's Dictionary of Classical Literature and Antiquities, Second Edition, Harry Thurston Peck, ed., Harper & Brothers Publishers, New York (1898).
- T. Robert S. Broughton, The Magistrates of the Roman Republic, American Philological Association (1952).

Political offices
Preceded by Publius Volumnius Amintinus Gallus, and Servius Sulpicius Camerinus Cornutus	Consul of the Roman Republic; 460 BC with Publius Valerius Poplicola II	Succeeded by Quintus Fabius Vibulanus III and Lucius Cornelius Maluginensis Uritinus
