= Publius Servilius Priscus (consul 463 BC) =

5th century BC Roman senator and consul

- Died: 463 BC
- Office: Consul (463 BC)
- Children: Quintus Servilius Priscus Fidenas

Publius Servilius Priscus was a Roman senator active in the fifth century BC and consul in 463 BC.

== Family ==
He was probably the son of Spurius Servilius Structus (consul in 476 BC), and the father of Quintus Servilius Priscus Fidenas, dictator in 435 and 418 BC. Diodorus Siculus gives him the paternal cognomen of "Structus", which was carried by his ancestors, but the name was not given to him by either the Fasti Capitolini or Livy (4.21.9).

== Biography ==
In 463 BC, he was elected consul with Lucius Aebutius Helva as his colleague. They entered office on the first of August, because at the time the consular years began on that day. In the beginning of September, the livestock was stricken by an epidemic, which also afflicted the people. According to Dionysius of Halicarnassus, the epidemic began with the livestock then began to spread throughout the city, killing many people. It entered the city because the peasants took refuge in Rome, bringing their livestock with them. Both Helva and Priscus fell to the pestilence, in that order. The augurs, Manius Valerius Maximus and Titus Verginius Tricostus Rutilus, and Curio Maximus Servius Sulpicius Camerinus Cornutus fell to the affliction that year as well.

When the two consuls were found dead, an interrex was given a period of five days to elect new consuls. At the end of the fifth day, elections were not held, and a new interrex took over. Consular elections were held in 462 BC, during the interregnum of Publius Valerius Poplicola, resulting in the election of Lucius Lucretius Tricipitinus and Titus Veturius Geminus Cicurinus as consuls.

== Bibliography ==
=== Primary sources ===
- Dionysius of Halicarnassus, Roman Antiquities, Book IX
- Livy, The History of Rome, Books III-IV

=== Secondary sources ===
- Broughton, Thomas Robert Shannon (1951), The Magistrates of the Roman Republic, Philological Monograph No. 15, New York: American Philological Association, ISBN 0-89130-811-3

Political offices
Preceded by A. Postumius Albus Regillensis; Sp. Furius Medullinus Fusus	Roman consul 463 BC; With: Lucius Aebutius Helva	Succeeded by L. Lucretius Tricipitinus; T. Veturius Geminus Cicurinus
