= Titus Veturius Geminus Cicurinus (consul 462 BC) =

5th-century BC Roman politician and consul

Consul of the Roman Republic
- In office 1 August 462 BC – 31 July 461 BC Serving with Lucius Lucretius Tricipitinus
- Preceded by: Publius Servilius Priscus Structus (consul 463 BC), Lucius Aebutius Helva
- Succeeded by: Publius Volumnius Amintinus Gallus, Servius Sulpicius Camerinus Cornutus (consul 461 BC)

Personal details
- Born: Unknown Ancient Rome
- Died: Unknown Ancient Rome

Titus Veturius Geminus Cicurinus was a Roman politician of the 5th century BC, consul in 462 BC and maybe decemvir in 451 BC.

== Family ==
He was a member of the Veturii Cicurini, patrician branch of the gens Veturia. He was the son of Titus Veturius Geminus Cicurinus, consul in 494 BC.

== Biography ==
=== Consulship ===
In 462 BC, he became consul with Lucius Lucretius Tricipitinus. The Romans recovered from a severe epidemic that occurred the year before and had taken the two consuls Publius Servilius Priscus Structus and Lucius Aebutius Helva, the augurs Titus Verginius Tricostus Rutilus and Manius Valerius Volusus Maximus, and the Curio Maximus Servius Sulpicius Camerinus Cornutus. Before the end of his consulship, a series of interreges were nominated in order to organize new elections. This they conducted during the term of the interrex, Publius Valerius Publicola in 462 BC.

=== War against the Aequi and the Volsci ===
The Aequi and Volsci attempted to take advantage of the consequences of the epidemic and attacked the territories of Rome and the Hernici. Geminus easily put the Volsci to flight while Lucius Lucretius inflicted a serious defeat against the pillagers, recovering the loot that they had taken from Roman territory. For these victories, Lucius Lucretius was given the honor of celebrating a triumph and Geminus was given an Ovation.

==== The rogatio Terentilia ====
When the consuls were absent from Rome, leading their armies in campaign against the Aequi and the Volsci, Terentilius, tribune of the plebs, proposed a law creating a special commission charged with regulating consular power. Quintus Fabius Vibulanus, named praefectus urbi in absence of the consuls, opposed drafting the law and deferred the vote until the return of the consuls.

=== Decemvirate ===
In 451 BC, he was probably among the First Decemvirate - who wrote the first legal documents of Rome, the Law of the Twelve Tables, and who, according to tradition, governed Rome for one year with moderation. However, it is not certain that he was a decemvir as ancient authors disagree on his name. The Fasti Capitolini and Diodorus Siculus give the praenomen of Spurius, Livy that of Lucius, and Dionysius of Halicarnassus that of Titus. While many of the decemvirs were also consuls, only Titus Veturius Geminus Cicurinus and his (presumed) cousin Gaius Veturius Cicurinus match well with their filiations given by the Fasti Capitolini.

== Bibliography ==
=== Ancient bibliography ===
- Livy, Ab urbe condita
- (in French) Diodorus Siculus, Universal History, Book XII, 9 on the site Philippe Remacle
- Dionysius of Halicarnassus, Roman Antiquities, Book X, 1-16, and Book X, 45-63 at LacusCurtius

=== Modern bibliography ===
- Broughton, T. Robert S. (1951), "The Magistrates of the Roman Republic", Philological Monographs, number XV, volume I, vol. I, 509 B.C. - 100 B.C., New York: The American Philological Association
- Briquel, Dominique (2000), "La nuit du V^{e} siècle", Roman History. Tome I, Des origines à Auguste (in French), pp. 163–202, ISBN 978-2-213-03194-1

Political offices
Preceded by Publius Servilius Priscus, Lucius Aebutius Helva	Consul of the Roman Republic; 462 BC with Lucius Lucretius Tricipitinus	Succeeded by Publius Volumnius Amintinus Gallus, Servius Sulpicius Camerinus Cornutus
