= Cincinnato =

Cincinnato or Cincinato is the Italian form of the Latin name Cincinnatus. It may refer to:

- People named Cincinnatus in Italian contexts, especially:
  - Lucius Quinctius Cincinnatus, early Roman general and dictator, namesake of many places in Italy
- Cincinnato Baruzzi
- Cincinnato, a municipality of Anzio in Italy
- Romulo Cincinato

== See also ==
- Cincinnatus (disambiguation)
