= Battle of Mount Algidus =

Battle between the Roman Republic and the Aequi (458 BC)

- Part of the Roman-Italic Wars
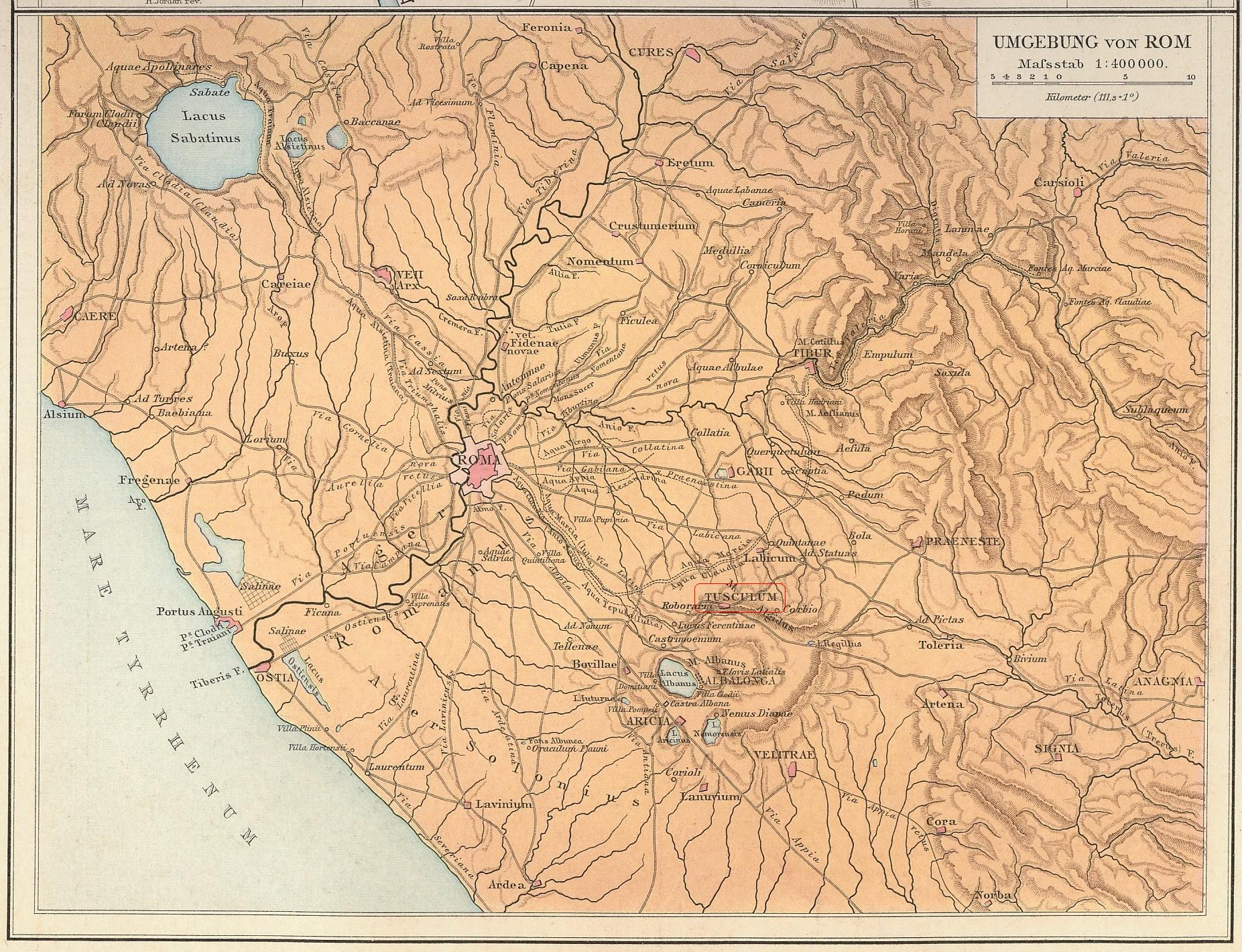
- Surroundings of Rome in Antiquity
Date	458 BC
Location	Mount Algidus, near Rome 41°43′23″N 12°46′10″E
Result	Roman victory

Belligerents
Roman Republic	Aequi

Commanders and leaders
Lucius Quinctius Cincinnatus, Lucius Minucius Esquilinus Augurinus	Cloelius Gracchus
- Location within Italy

The Battle of Mount Algidus was fought in 458 BC, between the Roman Republic and the Aequi, near Mount Algidus in Latium. The Roman dictator Lucius Quinctius Cincinnatus turned an expected Roman defeat into an important victory.

== Background ==
The government of Rome was already shared between the original Romans, the Latin and Sabine peoples. For example, the Quinctia gens, who had a major influence on Roman public life during this time, were of Latin origin. The Hernici were allied to Rome; the Etruscans were not impinging on the Romans, even though the Etruscan town of Veii was close to Rome.

The greatest enemies of Rome at this time were the Volsci and the Aequi. The Volsci were based in territory to the southeast of Rome, while the Aequi were based to the east. The Aequi kept attacking Rome and its surroundings, either alone or with allies. In particular, the Aequi moved from the Apennine Mountains towards Tusculum. Their attacks disturbed trade and commercial communications along the Via Latina, as well as throughout Roman territory.

The situation at Rome in this time was disturbing. There were conflicts between the Roman patricians and plebeians. There was also a revolt by the slaves of Rome. During the revolt, the Capitol was held by the slaves for a lengthy period, along with the most important temples of Rome. It was during this revolt that consul Publius Valerius Poplicola had died. The revolt ended only with the arrival of an army from Tusculum, led by the Tusculan dictator Lucius Mamilius. Meanwhile, Cincinnatus was appointed consul to replace Poplicola.

In 459 BC, the Aequi occupied Tusculum. In response to the threat, the Romans decided to send an army to help the allied city, under the command of the consul Lucius Cornelius Maluginensis. In addition, the consul Quintus Fabius Vibulanus, who was at that point besieging Antium, moved his forces to attack Tusculum. In the end, the Tusculans were able to recapture their city, with Vibulanus killing many Aequi near Mount Algidus. A truce was then arranged with the Aequi.

The following year, 458 BC, the Aequi broke the truce. They attacked Tusculum again, and camped near Algidus; at the same time, a Sabine army moved against Rome. Two Roman armies were formed in haste: the consul Gaius Nautius Rutilus planned to move against the Aequian territories, while his colleague, Lucius Minucius Esquilinus Augurinus, planned to move against the Aequi camped near the mountain.

Minucius did not attack the Aequi, who by nightfall had started to build a fortification all around the Roman camp. Since Nautius did not know how to handle the situation, Cincinnatus, whose brief term as consul had ended, was nominated dictator.

== Battle ==
Cincinnatus chose his magister equitum, and levied every available Roman in the Campus Martius, requiring them to bring food for five days, along with twelve valli. The vallus was the pole brought by each Roman soldier (each soldier usually carried three or four poles). Valli were used to build a protective wall around the camp; a requirement of twelve valli instead of one was unusual.

The Roman army arrived at Mount Algidus by nightfall. Cincinnatus signalled to the besieged Romans that he had arrived, then ordered his men to build a wall all around the Aequi. The Aequi attacked Cincinnatus, but they were soon obliged to turn and face the Romans under Minucius, who had left their camp to aid their countrymen. At dawn, the wall around the Aequi was completed; Cincinnatus ordered his men, who had marched and worked for a whole day without rest, to attack the Aequi within the wall. The Aequi, unable to sustain a double attack, surrendered. Cincinnatus let all but the leaders of the Aequi go.

== Aftermath ==
The spoils from the sack of the Aequian camp were distributed among Cincinnatus' men, while the Romans who had fought under Minucius were poorly regarded, and Minucius himself was obliged to resign the consulship. The Aequian leaders were brought to Rome as prisoners, where Cloelius Gracchus, the Aequian commander, was paraded in Cincinnatus' triumphal procession. Cincinnatus resigned the dictatorship, having held it for just sixteen days. Lucius Mamilius, the Tusculan commander, was rewarded with Roman citizenship.

== Bibliography ==
- Dionysius of Halicarnassus, Romaike Archaiologia (Roman Antiquities).
- Titus Livius (Livy), History of Rome.
