= Volumnia gens =

Ancient Roman family

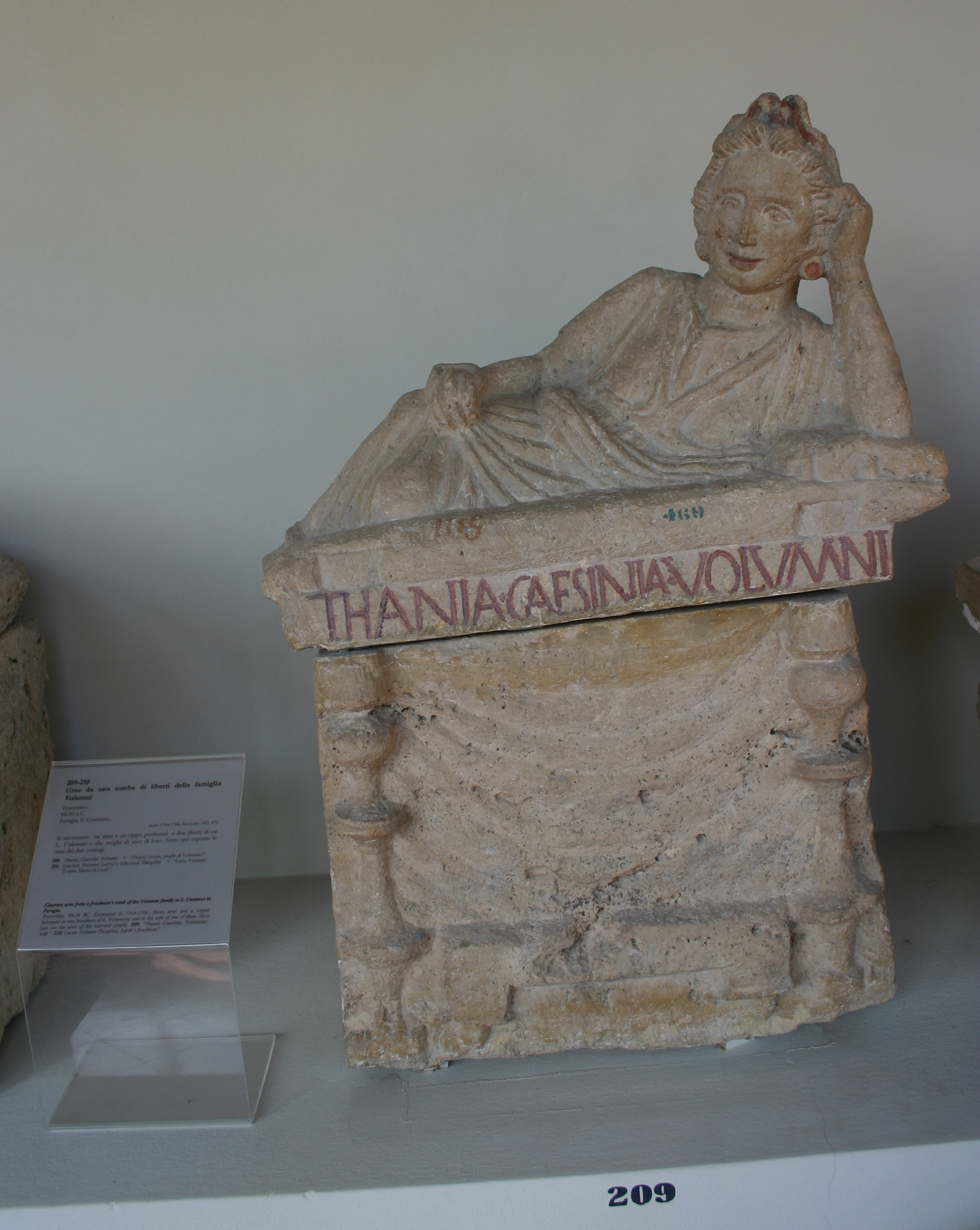
Etruscan urn, 88–50 BC, containing the remains of Thania Caesinia Volumni, in the National Museum of Umbrian Archaeology at Perugia.

The Gens Volumnia was an old but minor family of ancient Rome. Members of this gens are mentioned from the earliest period of the Roman Republic down to the age of Cicero, and Publius Volumnius Amintinus Gallus obtained the consulship as early as BC 461, but only a few of the Volumnii achieved any prominence in Roman history.

== Origin ==
From various inscriptions, the Volumnii are known to have been of Etruscan origin, and are attested as early as the seventh century BC. Older scholarship presumes that the Volumnii must originally have been patricians, since Publius Volumnius Amintinus Gallus held the consulship in the fifth century BC, and according to Roman tradition the consulship was closed to the plebeians until the passage of the Lex Licinia Sextia in 367 BC. However, all of the later Volumnii appearing in history were plebeians.

This apparent contradiction might be resolved by noting that most patrician gentes had plebeian namesakes during the later Republic. However, very few of these belonged to the "plebeian nobility", which held positions of prominence in the Roman state, and more than half of these held office within the first three decades of the Republic. This has led recent scholarship to conclude that most of these consuls, likely including Volumnius, were in fact plebeians, and that the patricians did not achieve their near monopoly on the office until the latter half of the fifth century.

== Praenomina ==
The only praenomina found among the Volumnii mentioned in history are Publius, Lucius, Marcus, and Gaius, all of which were amongst the most common names throughout Roman history.

== Branches and cognomina ==
The only surnames found among the early Volumnii were Gallus, with the agnomen Amintinus, borne by the consul of 461 BC, and Flamma, with the agnomen Violens, borne by the consul of 307 and 296 BC. Gallus, signifying a cockerel was a common surname; at a later period it could also refer to a Gaul. Flamma refers to a flame, while Violens, "furious", is one of a large class of cognomina derived from the character of an individual.

Later cognomina of the Volumnii include Flaccus, originally referring to someone with floppy ears, and Eutrapelus, borrowed from Greek, which was bestowed on Publius Volumnius "on account of his liveliness and wit".

Among the epigraphy of the Volumnii in Etruria is the funerary urn of Thania Caesinia, a freedwoman of the first century BC. A tomb of the Volumnii has been discovered near Perugia.

== Members ==
This list includes abbreviated praenomina. For an explanation of this practice, see filiation.

- Volumnia, the wife of Gnaeus Marcius Coriolanus. (Note: This is the relationship given by Livy and Dionysius. Plutarch, whose account closely follows that of Dionysius, calls Volumnia the mother of Coriolanus, and gives his wife's name as "Vergilia".) When her husband, disgraced and exiled, returned to Rome at the head of a Volscian army, Volumnia and her children, together with her mother-in-law, Veturia, went to Coriolanus, and persuaded him to spare the city.
- Publius Volumnius M. f. M. n. Amintinus Gallus, consul in 461 BC, together with Servius Sulpicius Camerinus Cornutus. During their year of office, the tribunes of the plebs prevented the consuls from levying an army to fight the Aequi and Volsci, and brought Caeso Quinctius, the son of Cincinnatus, to trial on a charge of inciting violence against the tribunes. In 458, Gallus was one of the emissaries sent to seek redress from the Aequi.
- Lucius Volumnius C. f. C. n. Flamma, surnamed Violens, consul in 307 BC with Appius Claudius Caecus, was sent against the Messapians in Calabria during the Second Samnite War, and achieved considerable success. Elected with Claudius for a second time for 296, during the Third Samnite War, he fought against a coalition of Samnites and Etruscans, first in Etruria, then in Samnium, where he remained as proconsul the following year.
- Gaius Volumnius C. f., a senator named in the Senatus Consultum de Agro Pergameno of 129 BC.
- Lucius Volumnius L. f., a member of the staff of Gnaeus Pompeius Strabo in 89 BC, possibly one of the military tribunes.
- Marcus Volumnius, who was assassinated by Catiline during the dictatorship of Sulla.
- Publius Volumnius, a minor pontifex by 69 BC, and perhaps a senator in 66.
- Publius Volumnius, one of the judges during the trial of Aulus Cluentius Habitus.
- Lucius Volumnius, a senator and close friend of Cicero. He might be the same person as Volumnius Flaccus, a friend of Decimus Junius Brutus.
- Volumnius Flaccus, a friend of Decimus Junius Brutus Albinus, might be the same person as Lucius Volumnius, a friend of Cicero.
- Publius Volumnius, a philosopher and companion of Marcus Junius Brutus during his war against the second triumvirate, is quoted by Plutarch concerning the events and omens preceding the death of Brutus.
- Publius Volumnius Eutrapelus, a friend of Mark Antony, Cicero, and Marcus Junius Brutus, accompanied Antony on his campaign against Mutina in 43 BC, serving as praefectus fabrum. Volumnius' freedwoman, Volumnia Cytheris, became Antony's mistress.
- Volumnia P. l. Cytheris, the freedwoman of Publius Volumnius Eutrapelus, was a noted courtesan during the first century BC. She became the mistress of Mark Antony, and later of the poet Cornelius Gallus, in whose works she is addressed as "Lycoris".
- Volumnius, reputedly the author of various tragedies in the Etruscan style, and Varro's source for the Etruscan origin of the names of the three Romulean tribes, is a mistake for Volnius.
- Lucius Volumnius, a senator in 50 BC, mentioned by Varro.

== Bibliography ==
=== Ancient sources ===
- Quintus Asconius Pedianus, Commentarius in Oratio Ciceronis In Toga Candida (Commentary on Cicero's Oration In Toga Candida).
- Marcus Tullius Cicero, Epistulae ad Atticum; Epistulae ad Familiares; Philippicae; Pro Cluentio.
- Diodorus Siculus, Bibliotheca Historica (Library of History).
- Dionysius of Halicarnassus, Romaike Archaiologia (Roman Antiquities).
- Quintus Horatius Flaccus (Horace), Epistulae; Satirae (Satires).
- Titus Livius (Livy), History of Rome.
- Gaius Plinius Secundus (Pliny the Elder), Historia Naturalis (Natural History).
- Lucius Mestrius Plutarchus (Plutarch), Lives of the Noble Greeks and Romans (Parallel Lives).
- Marcus Terentius Varro, De Lingua Latina (On the Latin Language); Rerum Rusticarum (Rural Matters).

=== Modern sources ===
- T. Robert S. Broughton, The Magistrates of the Roman Republic, American Philological Association (1952–1986).
- Cassell's Latin and English Dictionary, D.P. Simpson, ed., Macmillan Publishing Company, New York (1963).
- George Davis Chase, "The Origin of Roman Praenomina", in Harvard Studies in Classical Philology, vol. VIII, pp. 103–184 (1897).
- Timothy J. Cornell, The Beginnings of Rome: Italy and Rome from the Bronze Age to the Punic Wars (c. 1000–264 BC), Routledge, London (1995).
- Dictionary of Greek and Roman Biography and Mythology, William Smith, ed., Little, Brown and Company, Boston (1849).
- Barthold Georg Niebuhr, The History of Rome, Julius Charles Hare and Connop Thirlwall, trans., John Smith, Cambridge (1828).
