= Publius Volumnius Amintinus Gallus =

Consul of the Roman Republic in 461 BC

Publius Volumnius Gallus Amintinus

Consul of the Roman Republic
- In office 1 August 461 BC – 31 July 460 BC Serving with Servius Sulpicius Camerinus Cornutus
- Preceded by: Lucius Lucretius Tricipitinus, Titus Veturius Geminus Cicurinus
- Succeeded by: Publius Valerius Poplicola, Gaius Claudius Sabinus Regillensis

Personal details
- Born: Unknown; Ancient Rome
- Died: Unknown; Ancient Rome

Publius Volumnius Amintinus Gallus was a consul of the Roman Republic in 461 BC; he served with Servius Sulpicius Camerinus Cornutus.

== Career ==
Several bad signs happened during the year, so the Sibylline Books were consulted. Livy suggests that their reading was manipulated by the consuls and the senate to counter the legislation of the tribune of the plebs Gaius Terentilius Harsa, who had the previous year pushed for a limitation of the consuls' powers.

In 460 BC, Volumnius served as a subordinate under the consul of the year Publius Valerius Poplicola. When Poplicola was killed in battle against Appius Herdonius, a Sabine rebel who had taken the Capitoline hill, Volumnius took command of his force, killing Herdonius, defeating his army, and putting an end to his rebellion

In 458 BC, Volumnius was sent as ambassador—together with Quintus Fabius Vibulanus and Aulus Postumius Albus Regillensis—to the Aequi, who had violated a treaty made with Rome the year before.

== Bibliography ==
=== Ancient sources ===
- Fasti Capitolini.
- Titus Livius (Livy), Ab Urbe Condita Libri (From the Founding of the City).

=== Modern sources ===
- T. Robert S. Broughton, The Magistrates of the Roman Republic, American Philological Association, 1952–1960.
