= Marcus Valerius Maximus Lactuca =

Roman consul in 456 BC

Consul of the Roman Republic
- In office 1 August 456 BC – 31 July 455 BC Serving with Spurius Verginius Tricostus Caeliomontanus
- Preceded by: Gaius Horatius Pulvillus, Quintus Minucius Esquilinus Augurinus
- Succeeded by: Titus Romilius Rocus Vaticanus, Gaius Veturius Cicurinus

Personal details
- Born: Unknown; Ancient Rome
- Died: Unknown; Ancient Rome
- Children: Marcus Valerius Lactuca Maximus
- Parent: Manius Valerius Maximus

Marcus Valerius Maximus Lactuca was a 5th-century BC Roman politician who was a Consul in 456 BC.

== Family ==
He was a member of the Valerii Maximi, a branch of the powerful Valeria family. He was the grandchild of Volusus Valerius and the son of the dictator of 494 BC, Manius Valerius Volusus Maximus. Including filiation his name was Marcus Valerius M'.f. Volusi n. Maximus Lactuca.

He had one known son, Marcus Valerius Lactuca Maximus, the consul suffect in 437 BC.

== Biography ==
=== Questorship (458 BC) ===
In 458 BC, Marcus Valerius was elected quaestor, with Titus Quinctius Capitolinus Barbatus as his colleague. They continued the prosecution against the tribune of the plebs, Marcus Volscius Fictor started by the previous year's quaestors. Fictor was accused of giving false testimony in the trial of Caeso Quinctius, which had led to Quinctius' exile in 461 BC.

=== Consulate (456 BC) ===
In 456 BC, he was elected consul together with Spurius Verginius Tricostus Caeliomontanus. Their term of office was during a period of political tension between the plebs represented by the tribunes of the plebs, and the patricians, represented by the senate and the consuls. Valerius and his colleague eventually came to a compromise with the tribunes, which resulted into a new law, known as the Lex Icilia de Aventino publicando, which allocated the Aventine Hill for the benefit of the commons.
