= Titus Veturius Geminus Cicurinus =

The name could refer to the following people:

- Titus Veturius Geminus Cicurinus, consul in 494 BC.
- Titus Veturius Geminus Cicurinus, consul in 462 BC and probable member of the first Decemvirate
