= Titus Aebutius Helva =

5th century BC Roman senator and general

Titus Aebutius Helva was a Roman senator and general from the early Republic, who held the consulship in 499 BC. He was magister equitum under Aulus Postumius Albus at the Battle of Lake Regillus. He was the father of Lucius Aebutius Helva, consul in 463 BC.

== Consulship ==
Aebutius was elected consul for the year 499 BC, with Gaius Veturius Geminus. Livius relates that during their consulship, the town of Fidenae was besieged, Crustumeria was taken, and Praeneste joined the Roman cause. However, there is no report of which actions were undertaken by each consul.

== Battle of Lake Regillus ==
For some time, the expectation of war between Rome and the Latins had been growing. The year after Aebutius' consulship, Aulus Postumius Albus was chosen as dictator, and as his magister equitum he nominated Aebutius. They marched into Latium, where they met a Latin army under the command of Octavius Mamilius, the dictator of Tusculum.

In the course of the battle, Aebutius and Mamilius, both on horseback, charged at one another and inflicted serious injuries. The Tuscan prince was wounded in the breast, and taken to the rear, while Aebutius' arm was so severely injured by Mamilius' lance that he had to withdraw from the fighting, and direct his forces at a distance. The battle ended in a decisive victory for the Romans.

== Envoy ==
About 493 BC, Aebutius was one of ten envoys sent by the senate to treat with the plebeians during the first seccessio plebis.

== Bibliography ==
- Dionysius of Halicarnassus, Romaike Archaiologia (Roman Antiquities).
- Titus Livius (Livy), History of Rome.
- Dictionary of Greek and Roman Biography and Mythology, William Smith, ed., Little, Brown and Company, Boston (1849).
- T. Robert S. Broughton, The Magistrates of the Roman Republic, American Philological Association (1952–1986).

Political offices
Preceded by Servius Sulpicius Camerinus Cornutus; Manius Tullius Longus	Roman consul 499 BC with Gaius Veturius Geminus Cicurinus	Succeeded by Quintus Cloelius Siculus; Titus Larcius
