= Terentilia gens =

Family in ancient Rome

The gens Terentilia was an obscure plebeian family at ancient Rome. Only one member of this gens appears in history; Gaius Terentilius Arsa was tribune of the plebs in 462 BC. A few others are known from inscriptions.

== Origin ==
The nomen Terentilius belongs to a large class of gentilicia derived from other names, typically cognomina ending in diminutive suffixes such as -ulus and -illus. Here the name may be formed from another nomen, Terentius, for which the diminutive Terentillus is found. The antiquarian Varro, himself a member of the Terentia gens, derived this name from terenus, a Sabine word meaning "soft", although Chase proposes the Latin terens, one who grinds or threshes. One of the Terentilii known from inscriptions has an Oscan praenomen, Statius.

== Branches and cognomina ==
The only surname associated with the early Terentilii is Arsa, also written Harsa. The later Terentilii have common cognomina, such as Firmus, strong, and Rufus, red.

== Members ==
This list includes abbreviated praenomina. For an explanation of this practice, see filiation.

- Gaius Terentilius Arsa, (Note: Dionysius calls him Terentius, a more familiar nomen, but no other Terentii appear in history for more than two centuries.) tribune of the plebs in 462 BC, called for the establishment of a commission to codify the laws respecting the imperium of the consuls.
- Gaius Terentilius, a freedman named in an inscription from Praeneste in Latium.
- Publius Terentilius, built a tomb at Tarquinii in Etruria.
- Quintus Terentilius, the father of Quintus Terentilius Rufus.
- Statius Terentilius, the former master of Statius Terentilius Firmus.
- Titus Terentilius, the former master of Gaius Terentilius.
- Statius Terentilius St. l. Firmus, a freedman named in an inscription from Rome.
- Quintus Terentilius Q. f. Rufus, named in an inscription from Rome.

== See also ==
- List of Roman gentes

== Bibliography ==
- Titus Livius (Livy), History of Rome.
- Dionysius of Halicarnassus, Romaike Archaiologia.
- Ambrosius Theodosius Macrobius, Saturnalia.
- Dictionary of Greek and Roman Biography and Mythology, William Smith, ed., Little, Brown and Company, Boston (1849).
- Theodor Mommsen et alii, Corpus Inscriptionum Latinarum (The Body of Latin Inscriptions, abbreviated CIL), Berlin-Brandenburgische Akademie der Wissenschaften (1853–present).
- George Davis Chase, "The Origin of Roman Praenomina", in Harvard Studies in Classical Philology, vol. VIII, pp. 103–184 (1897).
- T. Robert S. Broughton, The Magistrates of the Roman Republic, American Philological Association (1952).
- Mario Torelli, Elogia Tarquiniensia, Sansoni, Florence (1975).
- John C. Traupman, The New College Latin & English Dictionary, Bantam Books, New York (1995).
