= Glenea morosa =

Scientific classification
- Domain: Eukaryota
- Kingdom: Animalia
- Phylum: Arthropoda
- Class: Insecta
- Order: Coleoptera
- Suborder: Polyphaga
- Infraorder: Cucujiformia
- Family: Cerambycidae
- Genus: Glenea
- Species: G. morosa

Binomial name
- Glenea morosa (Pascoe, 1888)

Synonyms
- Volumnia leucomelaena Bates, 1890; Volumnia morosa Pascoe, 1888; Volumnia transversalis Lameere, 1892

Species of beetle

Glenea morosa is a species of beetle in the family Cerambycidae. It was described by Francis Polkinghorne Pascoe in 1888, originally under the genus Volumnia.
