= Manius Tullius Longus =

Roman politician, consul in 500 BC

Manius Tullius Longus (fl. c. 500 BC) was consul at Rome in 500 BC, with Servius Sulpicius Camerinus Cornutus.

Livius reports that no important events occurred during this year and has Longus incorrectly named as Marcus Manlius Tullus. Dionysius instead states that a conspiracy to restore the Tarquins to power was detected and crushed by Camerinus while war was fought against the Fidenae. Dionysius also has Longus dying during the Ludi Romani, leaving his colleague as sole consul.

An alternate narrative is provided by Festus in conjecture with Valerius Maximus who numbers Tullius among several men who were burned publicly near the Circus Maximus in 486 BC for conspiring with the consul Spurius Cassius Vecellinus.

== Footnotes ==
Political offices
Preceded by Postumus Cominius Auruncus; Titus Larcius	Roman consul with Servius Sulpicius Camerinus Cornutus; 500 BC	Succeeded by Titus Aebutius Helva; Gaius Veturius Geminus Cicurinus
