= Lucius Minucius Esquilinus Augurinus =

5th-century BC Roman senator, consul and decemvir

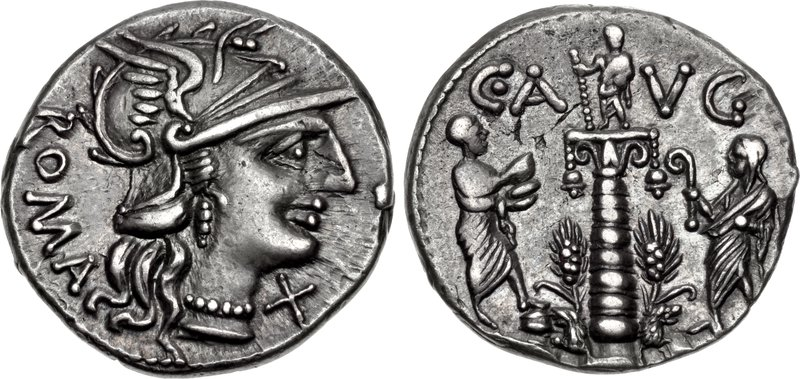
Denarius of Gaius Minucius Augurinus, minted in 135 BC. The reverse depicts the Columna Minucia, with at the top a statue of Minucius Augurinus, commemorating his grain distribution as praefectus annonae in 439 BC.

Lucius Minucius Esquilinus Augurinus (fl. c. 458 – 439 BC) was a Roman politician who was consul in 458 BC and decemvir in 450 BC.

== Family ==
Brother of Quintus Minucius Esquilinus Augurinus, consul in 457 BC, he was a member of the Minucii Augurini branch of the gens Minucia. Lucius was the son of a Publius Minucius and grandson of a Marcus Minucius. His complete name is Lucius Minucius P.f. M.n. Esquilinus Augurinus.

== Career ==
=== Consulship ===
In 458 BC, he was consul with Gaius Nautius Rutilus. Livy, Dionysius of Halicarnassus, and Diodorus Siculus called him consul ordinarius, but according to the Fasti Capitolini, he was the consul suffect, replacing a certain Carvetus who died at the beginning of his term.

This year, Rome had faced an assault by the Aequi whose treaty had expired the year before and Roman territory was pillaged by the Sabines, reaching as far as the city walls. The consuls levied two armies, Augurinus alongside the dictator Lucius Quinctius Cincinnatus, named by consul Rutilus, who relinquished command of the army once the mission was accomplished, and returned power to the Senate. Once back in Rome, Augurinus abdicated and command of his army was given to the praefectus Urbi, Quintus Fabius Vibulanus.

=== Decemvirate ===
In 450 BC, Lucius was elected as member of the Second Decemvirate against more qualified candidates thanks to the supportive actions of Appius Claudius Crassus, who had been decemvir the year before. This commission achieved the writing of the Law of the Twelve Tables, but under the influence of Crassus, they despotically maintained power after the end of their mission.

In 449 BC, the decemvirs, led by Crassus, illegally kept their power, against the will of the Roman Senate and the people. The invasion of the Sabines and the Aequi had consequently dispersed the decemvirs. Quintus Fabius Vibulanus, Manius Rabuleius, and Quintus Poetelius Libo met the Sabines in battle while Lucius Minucius accompanied Marcus Cornelius Maluginensis, Lucius Sergius Esquilinus, and Titus Antonius Merenda in their fight with the Aequi. However, the army had revolted against the decemvirs, and the plebeians had left the city en masse for Aventine Hill. Lucius Minucius and his colleagues acquiesced and gave up their power - some left in exile. Their goods were confiscated.

=== Prefect of the grain-market ===
In 440 BC, a great famine had reached Rome. Given the urgency of the situation, the consuls had quickly elected a praefectus annonae ("Prefect of the Grain-market"), some sort of manager of the Republic's grain supply, whose purpose it was to secure the grain supply. It was probably this year that the aedile of the plebs, Manius Marcius, organized a distribution of grain for the plebs, where each individual was given one-third of a Roman bushel (modius).

The example of Manius Marcius was soon followed by Spurius Maelius, a rich member of the Equestrian order, who had acquired great quantities of fresh wheat in Etruria, and then distributed it to the people for free. His popularity became such that the Patricians were convinced that he was only trying to gain support in order to become king. He had already taken measures for a coup. In the meantime, Lucius Minucius had informed Titus Quinctius Capitolinus Barbatus, and Agrippa Menenius Lanatus, who were elected consuls for the year 439 BC, and named Lucius Quinctius Cincinnatus dictator at the start of their term. Cincinnatus had Spurius Maelius assassinated by his magister equitum, Gaius Servilius Ahala. According to ancient authors, Lucius Minucius was rewarded with the erection of a statue for having alerted the patricians to the danger that Spurius Maelius posed.

== Bibliography ==
- Broughton, T. Robert S. (1951), "The Magistrates of the Roman Republic", Philological Monographs, number XV, volume I, vol. I, 509 B.C. - 100 B.C., New York: The American Philological Association
- Michael Crawford, Roman Republican Coinage, Cambridge University Press, 1974.

Political offices
Preceded by Quintus Fabius; Lucius Cornelius	Roman consul with Gaius Nautius Rutilus; 458 BC	Succeeded by Quintus Minucius; Gaius Horatius II
