= Cincinnatus (mural) =

Mural by Richard Haas in Cincinnati, Ohio

Coordinates: 39.1066°N 84.5146°W

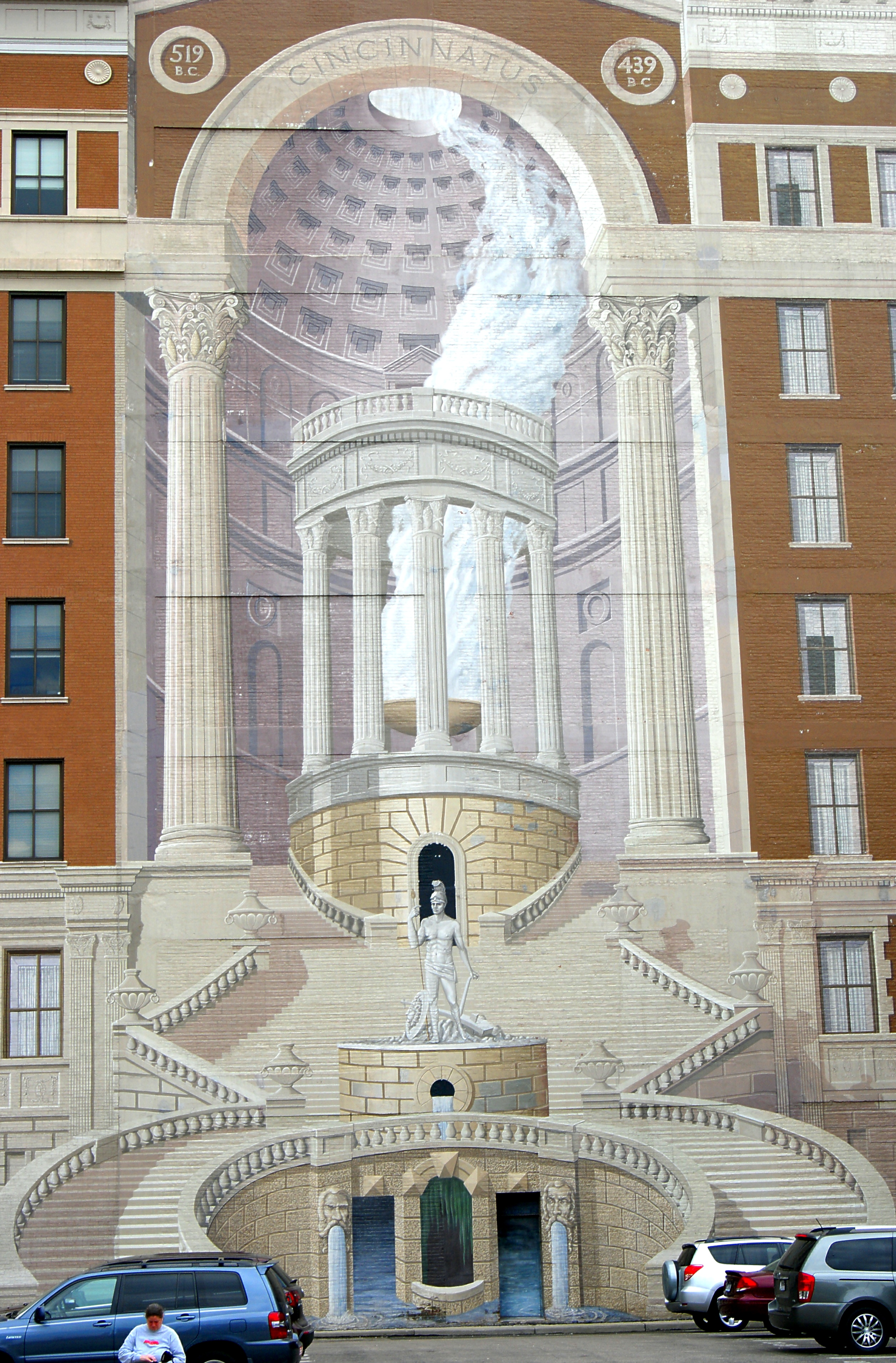
Cincinnatus mural on Brotherhood Building

Homage to Cincinnatus is a public artwork by Richard Haas in Cincinnati, Ohio, United States. The mural depicts Lucius Quinctius Cincinnatus, the namesake of Cincinnati. It is on the Brotherhood Building near the intersection of Central Parkway and Vine Street. It was commissioned by the Kroger Company 1983 in honor of their 100th year of business. In 2015, the mural was restored by 1001 Colors (previously ArtWorks) in collaboration with the original artist.
