= Aulus Verginius Tricostus Rutilus =

Roman Consul in 476 BC

Consul of the Roman Republic
- In office 1 August 476 BC – 31 July 475 BC Serving with Spurius Servilius Priscus Structus (consul 476 BC)
- Preceded by: Gaius Horatius Pulvillus, Titus Menenius Lanatus
- Succeeded by: Publius Valerius Poplicola (consul 475 BC), Gaius Nautius Rutilus

Personal details
- Born: Unknown; Ancient Rome
- Died: Unknown; Ancient Rome

Aulus Verginius Tricostus Rutilus was a Roman consul in 476 BC.

Following their defeat of the Roman army at the Battle of the Cremera in 477 BC, the Veientes marched on Rome and occupied the Janiculum. There they remained at the beginning of Verginius' consulship. Both consuls, Verginius and his colleague Spurius Servilius, remained in Rome to deal with the threat.

The Veientes marched from the Janiculum and crossed the Tiber, and assaulted the camp of Servilius. His force successfully repulsed the Veientes, who retreated to the Janiculum. The following morning Servilius' army took position at the foot of the Janiculum, and marched up the slope to attack the enemy. The battle went badly for the Romans, until a force led by Verginius attacked the Veientes from the rear, whereupon the Veientes were cut off and soundly defeated.

Political offices
| Preceded by Gaius Horatius Pulvillus, and Titus Menenius Lanatus | Consul of the Roman Republic; 476 BC with Spurius Servilius Priscus Structus | Succeeded by Publius Valerius Poplicola, and Gaius Nautius Rutilus |
