= Cincinnatus Honorary Society =

Society at University of Cincinnati, US

- Founded: 1917; 108 years ago University of Cincinnati
- Type: Honor
- Affiliation: Independent
- Status: Active
- Scope: Local
- Colors: Red and White
- Chapters: 1
- Headquarters: 2600 Clifton Avenue; Cincinnati, Ohio 45220; United States

Cincinnatus Honorary Society (Cincinnatus) is a co-ed honorary society at the University of Cincinnati. It is the second oldest honorary on the University of Cincinnati’s campus, following Sigma Sigma, and the oldest co-ed honorary at UC.

== History ==
Founded in 1917 at the University of Cincinnati, the Cincinnatus Honorary Society was created to strengthen alumni relations, later shifting its focus to student recruitment. In the 1930s and 1940s, the society became known for its efforts in recruiting students through organized trips to high schools across Ohio and neighboring states.

As the name suggests, the organization is named after Cincinnatus, a Roman general who is also the namesake for the city of Cincinnati. Though it faced challenges during the Great Depression and World War II, it was reorganized in 1952, merging with the university’s orientation committee to assist with student recruitment and hospitality. Over the years, Cincinnatus has grown into a prestigious honorary society, dedicated to promoting and supporting the University of Cincinnati. Today, the organization recognizes students who have shown dedication to recruitment and retention of students at the university.

== Membership ==
Members are selected by the organization internally and "tapped" or found on campus during the day.

== Activities ==
The organization sponsors and organizes an event called the "Nearly Naked Mile", an annual run for the benefit of a nonprofit in Cincinnati since 2007. Participants run a one-mile course around the campus while "nearly naked", during homecoming week to raise money for the underprivileged in the Cincinnati area.

== Notable members ==
- Louise Nippert (1934), philanthropist and owner of the Cincinnati Reds
- Myron Ullman (1967), former chairman and CEO of J. C. Penney, current chairman of Starbucks Corporation
- Peter Woo (1968), Hong Kong billionaire businessman
- Brad Wenstrup (1979), politician, U.S. Representative for Ohio's 2nd congressional district
