= Quintus Cloelius Siculus =

Roman politician and patrician, consul in 498 BC

Quintus Cloelius Siculus was a Roman Republican politician and patrician during the beginning of the 5th century BC. He served as Consul of Rome in 498 BC together with Titus Larcius.

His gens originated from Alba Longa and had come to Rome under the reign of Tullus Hostilius. He was the first member of his family to serve as consul.

In 498 BC, he was elected as a consul together with Titus Larcius, a second time consul who had also previously served in the office of dictator.

According to Dionysius of Halicarnassus, Cloelius named his colleague Larcius as dictator in an effort to fight a battle against the Latins. Titus Livius and others however maintain that Larcius was named dictator three years prior to Cloelius' ascension.

== See also ==
- Cloelia gens

Political offices
Preceded by Titus Aebutius Helva; Gaius Vetusius Geminus Cicurinus	Roman consul 498 BC with Titus Larcius	Succeeded by Aulus Sempronius Atratinus; Marcus Minucius Augurinus
