= Lucius Aebutius Helva =

Roman politician and general (died 463 BC)

Consul of the Roman Republic
- In office 1 August 463 BC – 463 BC Serving with Publius Servilius Priscus
- Preceded by: Aulus Postumius Albus Regillensis, Spurius Furius Medullinus Fusus
- Succeeded by: Lucius Lucretius Tricipitinus, Titus Veturius Geminus Cicurinus

Personal details
- Born: Ancient Rome
- Died: 463 BC Ancient Rome

Lucius Aebutius Helva (died 463 BC) was a politician and general of the Roman Republic. He was consul in 463 BC with Publius Servilius Priscus, but died of the plague during his term.

== Family background ==
Lucius belonged to the patrician gens Aebutia, which was of Etruscan origin. The cognomen Helva is likewise Etruscan, and has been found on an inscription from the city of Clusium, possibly the hometown of the gens. The gens became notable at the beginning of the Republic thanks to its first known member: Titus Aebutius Helva, who was consul in 499 BC and served during the semi-legendary Battle of Lake Regillus. Lucius was the only recorded son of the consul of 499.

=== Stemma of the Aebutii ===
Legend
Green	Consul

T. Aebutius
T. Aebutius Helva cos 499, mag eq. 496
L. Aebutius Helva cos 463
Post. Aebutius; Helva Cornicen cos 442	M. Aebutius; Helva trium. col. ded.

== Career ==
Lucius was elected consul prior in 463 BC, with Publius Servilius Priscus as consul posterior, which means the Centuriate Assembly elected Lucius before Servilius. Livy adds that they entered in office on the calends of Sextilis (1 August), one of the few years for which we have a precise date. Several historians deduced that consuls entered office on this day between 479 and 451, but others have disputed this interpretation, arguing that during the 5th century the date of entry was flexible and depended on military campaigns.

Since the beginning of the 5th century, Rome was in a state of constant war with the Aequi and the Volsci, two Italic peoples who moved from central Italy to settle in south Latium. Livy relates that due to this conflict, the city was crowded with refugees and cattle from the countryside and the promiscuity triggered a deadly plague. Dionysius gives a different account: the plague started on 1 September 463 and first hit the cattle, but the Aequi and Volsci only attacked once they learnt about the effect of the plague on Rome. Both agree that Rome was unable to help its allies due to the epidemic. This plague was the first recorded at Rome, but the exact nature of the epidemic remains unknown, due to the lack of a uniformed taxonomy of diseases among ancient authors. Moreover, they often used a stereotypical narrative that mimicked that of Thucydides on the Athenian plague of 430: the plague starts with animals, then hits the people, who are unable to defend the city as a result.

The consuls might have appointed a dictator on 15 September 463—soon after the outbreak—because one century later, a dictator was appointed on this day to carry a ceremony of fastening a nail on the right side of the Temple of Jupiter Optimus Maximus, and again in 263, in order to follow an ancient "religious obligation". The dictator's name could have been Gaius Aemilius Mamercus. Both consuls died of the plague however, and—according to Livy and Dionysius—between a quarter and half of the Senate. Lucius was the first consul to die; his colleague Servilius might have died as late as July 462, soon before the end of his term. One or two interreges were appointed to conduct the election of the new consuls, which was a bit delayed to 11 August because of the plague.

The invaders overwhelmed the Hernici and moved unopposed toward Rome, but, finding nothing worth plundering, they retreated. A force of Latins and Hernici came upon them in the Alban Hills, and suffered heavy losses in the ensuing battle.

== Bibliography ==
=== Ancient sources ===
- Dionysius of Halicarnassus, Romaike Archaiologia (English translation on LacusCurtius).
- Livy, Ab Urbe Condita (English translation by Rev. Canon Roberts on Wikisource).

=== Modern sources ===
- T. Robert S. Broughton, The Magistrates of the Roman Republic, American Philological Association, 1951–1952.
- Tim J. Cornell, The Origins of Rome, Italy and Rome from the Bronze Age to the Punic Wars (c. 1000–264 BC), London & New York, Routledge, 1995.
- Attilio Degrassi, Fasti Capitolini recensuit, praefatus est, indicibus instruxit Atilius Degrassi, Turin, 1954.
- Richard Phare Duncan-Jones, "The impact of the Antonine plague", in Journal of Roman Archaeology, Volume 9, 1996, pp. 108–136.
- Denis Feeney, Caesar's Calendar, Ancient Time and the Beginnings of History, Berkeley/Los Angeles/London, California University Press, 2007.
- Edward John Kenney, Wendell Vernon Clausen, The Cambridge History of Classical Literature, Cambridge University Press, 1982.
- Theodor Mommsen, Die römische Chronologie bis auf Caesar, Berlin, 1858.
- Robert Maxwell Ogilvie, Commentary on Livy, books 1–5, Oxford, Clarendon Press, 1965.
- Carl Pauli, Olof August Danielsson, Corpus Inscriptionum Etruscarum (abbreviated CIR), Vol. 1 (Tit. 1-4917), Leipzig, 1893 (1902, 1964).
- August Pauly, Georg Wissowa, Friedrich Münzer, et alii, Realencyclopädie der Classischen Altertumswissenschaft (abbreviated PW), J. B. Metzler, Stuttgart, 1894–1980.
- Francisco Pina Polo, The Consul at Rome: The Civil Functions of the Consuls in the Roman Republic, Cambridge University Press, 2011.
- Israel Shatzman, "Patricians and Plebeians: The Case of the Veturii", The Classical Quarterly, Vol. 23, No. 1 (May, 1973), pp. 65–77.
- Lily Ross Taylor and T. Robert S. Broughton, "The Order of the Two Consuls' Names in the Yearly Lists", Memoirs of the American Academy in Rome, 19 (1949), pp. 3–14.

Political offices
Preceded by Aulus Postumius Albus Regillensis; Spurius Furius Medullinus Fusus	Consul of the Roman Republic with Publius Servilius Priscus; 463 BC	Succeeded by Lucius Lucretius Tricipitinus; Titus Veturius Geminus Cicurinus
