= Spurius Servilius Structus =

5th century BC Roman senator, consul and general

- Office: Consul (476 BC)
- Children: Publius Servilius Priscus

Spurius Servilius Structus was a Roman consul in 476 BC.

Following their defeat of the Roman army at the Battle of the Cremera in 477 BC, the Veientes marched on Rome and had occupied the Janiculum. There they remained at the beginning of Servilius' consulship. Both consuls, Servilius and his colleague Aulus Verginius, remained in Rome to deal with the threat.

The Veientes marched from the Janiculum and crossed the Tiber, and assaulted the camp of Servilius. His force successfully repulsed the Veientes, who retreated to the Janiculum. The following morning Servilius' army took position at the foot of the Janiculum, and marched up the slope to attack the enemy. The battle went badly for the Romans, until a force led by the other consul Verginius attacked the Veientes from the rear, whereupon the Veientes were cut off and soundly defeated.

In 475 BC, immediately after Servilius' term as consul had ended, the tribunes Lucius Caedicius and Titus Statius brought charges against him for his poor conduct of the war against the Veientes. According to Livy, Servilius spoke boldly in defence of the charges. In particular, Servilius upbraided the assembly for convicting Titus Menenius Lanatus the previous year, leading to his death from shame. Servilius' consular colleague, Verginius, also spoke in Servilius' defence, and Servilius was acquitted. In the same year Servilius served as legate under the consul Publius Valerius Poplicola.

Political offices
Preceded by Gaius Horatius Pulvillus; Titus Menenius Lanatus	Roman consul 476 BC with Aulus Verginius Tricostus Rutilus	Succeeded by Publius Valerius Poplicola; Gaius Nautius Rutilus
