= Gaius Veturius Geminus Cicurinus =

5th-century BC Roman politician and general

- Died: 486 BC?
- Office: Consul (499 BC)
- Children: Gaius Veturius Cicurinus

Gaius (or Publius) Veturius Geminus Cicurinus (fl. c. 499–486 BC) was a Roman Republican politician during the beginning of the 5th century BC. He served as Consul of Rome in 499 BC together with Titus Aebutius Helva. He was a member of the patrician class and of the Veturia gens.

During his consulship, the Romans laid siege to the city of Fidenae which was taken successfully. During this year, the Latins also announced their secession from Rome.

According to Livy his prenomen was Caius, but according to Dionysius of Halicarnassus, he was known as Publius. In fact it does appear that Publius is more likely his correct name as P. Veturius was one of the first quaestors (in 509 BC, first year of the republic) and was likely the same person as the consul of 499 BC. P. Veturius is among the names listed by Festus as having been publicly burned at the Circus Maximus in 486 BC, possibly for conspiring with the consul Spurius Cassius Vecellinus. Broughton suggests from the reading of Valerius Maximus that Veturius might have been military tribune in 486 BC.

His cognomen, Geminus brings attention to his (presumed) twin brother Titus Veturius Geminus Cicurinus who was consul in 494 BC. Looking at filations he was probably the father of Gaius Veturius Cicurinus, consul in 455 BC.

== See also ==
- Veturia gens

Political offices
Preceded by Servius Sulpicius Camerinus Cornutus; Manius Tullius Longus	Roman consul 499 BC with Titus Aebutius Helva	Succeeded by Quintus Cloelius Siculus; Titus Larcius
