= Ahala =

Ahala may refer to:

- Gaius Servilius Structus Ahala, Roman consul in 478 BC
- Gaius Servilius Ahala (fl. 439 BC), Roman politician and assassin
- Gaius Servilius Ahala (consular tribune 408 BC)
- Quintus Servilius Ahala, Roman consul in 365, 362 and 342 BC
