= Gaius Nautius Rutilus =

Consul of the Roman Republic in 475 BC and 458 BC

Consul of the Roman Republic
- In office 1 August 475 BC – 31 July 474 BC Serving with Publius Valerius Poplicola (consul 475 BC)
- Preceded by: Aulus Verginius Tricostus Rutilus, Spurius Servilius Priscus Structus (consul 476 BC)
- Succeeded by: Lucius Furius Medullinus (consul 474 BC), Gnaeus Manlius Vulso (consul 474 BC)
- In office 1 August 458 BC – 31 July 457 BC Serving with Lucius Minucius Esquilinus Augurinus
- Preceded by: Quintus Fabius Vibulanus, Lucius Cornelius Maluginensis Uritinus
- Succeeded by: Gaius Horatius Pulvillus, Quintus Minucius Esquilinus Augurinus

Personal details
- Born: Unknown; Ancient Rome
- Died: Unknown; Ancient Rome

Gaius Nautius Rutilus (fl. c. 475 – 457 BC) was a Roman politician who was consul of the Roman Republic from 475 BC until 474 BC and from 458 BC until 457 BC.

== Biography ==
Nautius was probably the brother, or perhaps the son of Spurius Nautius Rutilus, consul in 488 BC.

In his first consulship he was the senior consul, and his colleague was Publius Valerius Poplicola. Nautius was given command of Roman forces against the Volsci who had invaded Latium. Nautius ravaged the Volscian territory, but there was no significant engagement with the enemy.

Nautius held the consulship a second time in 458 BC with Lucius Minucius Esquilinus Augurinus. During his second consulship, he successfully carried on war against the Sabines. That same year, the Aequi attacked the allied city of Tusculum and defeated his colleague, Minucius. Nautius Rutilus returned to Rome to oversee the Roman Senate electing a dictator, Lucius Quinctius Cincinnatus, to deal with the invaders.

Political offices
| Preceded by Aulus Verginius Tricostus Rutilus; Spurius Servilius Priscus Structus (consul 476 BC) | Consul of the Roman Republic with Publius Valerius Poplicola; 475 BC | Succeeded by Lucius Furius Medullinus; Gnaeus Manlius Vulso |
| Preceded by Quintus Fabius Vibulanus III; Lucius Cornelius Maluginensis Uritinus | Consul of the Roman Republic with Lucius Minucius Esquilinus Augurinus; 458 BC | Succeeded by Gaius Horatius Pulvillus II; Quintus Minucius Esquilinus Augurinus |
