= Cincinnati (disambiguation) =

Cincinnati is a city in the U.S. state of Ohio.

Cincinnati may also refer to:

- Cincinnati, Arkansas
- Cincinnati, Indiana
- Cincinnati, Iowa
- Cincinnati, Missouri
- Cincinnati (horse), Ulysses S. Grant's most famous horse during the American Civil War
- Cincinnati (magazine), a monthly lifestyle magazine in Cincinnati, Ohio
- "Cincinnati" (Harsh Realm), an episode of Harsh Realm
- "Cincinnati, Ohio" (song), a 1967 country music song by Connie Smith
- USS Cincinnati
- "Cincinnati" is trade label of Cincinnati Milling Machine Company (1889-1970)

== See also ==
- Cincinnatus, Roman dictator for whom all of the above are named, directly or indirectly
- Greater Cincinnati or the Cincinnati/Northern Kentucky metropolitan area
- Cincinnatian Series, a biostratigraphic rock layer dating from the upper Ordovician system that is exposed in southwestern Ohio, southeastern Indiana and northern Kentucky
- Cincinnatian, a passenger train
- Eola, Oregon, named Cincinnati from 1849 to 1856
- Society of the Cincinnati, a historical organization founded to preserve the ideals of American Revolutionary War officers
- 1373 Cincinnati, an asteroid in the Main belt
- The Cincinnati Kid
- Cincinnatia
- University of Cincinnati
  - Cincinnati Bearcats athletic teams representing the university
