= Spurius Verginius Tricostus Caeliomontanus =

5th century BC Roman consul and politician

Consul of the Roman Republic
- In office 1 August 456 BC – 31 July 455 BC Serving with Marcus Valerius Maximus Lactuca
- Preceded by: Gaius Horatius Pulvillus, Quintus Minucius Esquilinus Augurinus
- Succeeded by: Titus Romilius Rocus Vaticanus, Gaius Veturius Cicurinus

Personal details
- Born: Unknown; Ancient Rome
- Died: Unknown; Ancient Rome

Spurius Verginius Tricostus Caeliomontanus was a Roman consul and a Roman politician of the 5th century BC. There was no recorded date of his birth and death though there was a record his term of office from 456 BC to 455 BC. During his time in office he saw continued division between plebs and patrician.

== Family ==
He was the grandson of Aulus Verginius and the son of Aulus Verginius Tricostus Caeliomontanus, consul in 494 BC. His full name is Spurius Verginius A.f. Tricostus Caeliomontanus. Although there is some dispute as to who his son was: for example Titus Verginius Tricostus Caeliomontanus (consul 448) is either his nephew, son of his brother Aulus Verginius Tricostus Caeliomontanus (consul 469 BC), Consul in 469 BC or his own son.

== Biography ==
In 456 BC he was consul with Marcus Valerius Maximus Lactuca. Their term took place during a period of tension between the plebs, represented by its tribunes who wanted the Aventine part of the state domain with the rogatio Terentilia, and the patricians, who opposed the plebs measure. Concessions were made and the tribune Icilius obtained the votes to pass it into law, the Lex Icilia de Aventino publicando, which divided the Aventine into building lots for the benefit of the plebs.
