= Lucius Cornelius Maluginensis Uritinus =

Roman politician and general, consul in 459 BC

Consul of the Roman Republic
- In office 1 August 459 BC – 31 July 458 BC Serving with Quintus Fabius Vibulanus
- Preceded by: Gaius Claudius Sabinus Regillensis, Publius Valerius Poplicola (consul 475 BC)
- Succeeded by: Gaius Nautius Rutilus, Lucius Minucius Esquilinus Augurinus

Personal details
- Born: Unknown Ancient Rome
- Died: Unknown Ancient Rome

Lucius Cornelius Maluginensis Uritinus was a Roman politician and general of the 5th century BC, who served as consul once in 459 BC.

== Family ==
Lucius Cornelius Maluginensis Uritinus was a member of the patrician gens Cornelia and was the son of Servius Cornelius Maluginensis, the first consul of the family who acquired the office in 485 BC. Cornelius was either the father or brother of Marcus Cornelius Maluginensis, who served as a member of the decemviri in 450 and 449 BC.

== Consulship ==
In 459 BC, Cornelius was elected consul alongside Quintus Fabius Vibulanus, himself a two time consular. In this year, two events occurred which necessitated armed conflict, firstly the Aequians stormed the city of Tusculum, a Roman ally, and secondly an array of Volscians and Roman colonists rose up in revolt in the Roman colony of Antium. In response to these events, the senate assigned Fabius to fight the Aequians, and Cornelius to put down rebellious Antium. Upon arriving in Antium, Cornelius confronted the rebellious Antiates in battle, defeating them and putting them to flight. Cornelius then ravaged the nearby territory and laid siege to Antium. In response the Antiates attempted a sortie but were easily defeated. After this Cornelius resolved to take the city quickly and, with the use of scaling ladders and battering rams, thenceforth took Antium by storm. Upon entering the city, Cornelius took much loot and riches to deposit in the treasury and had the ringleaders of the rebellion scourged and beheaded. Upon returning to Rome, the senate decreed that both he and his colleague Fabius, who had also succeeded in his own campaign, be granted triumphs.

There is another tradition, which is imparted by Livy, which states that there was no Antiate rebellion and that both consuls conducted a joint campaign against the Aequians at Tusculum. This sequence of events seems less likely however, as the Fasti Triumphales records triumphs celebrated by both consuls against different enemies.

== Later life ==
In 449 BC, in the midst of the second year of the second set of decemviri, which included his son or brother Marcus and his former colleague Fabius, the decemvirs summoned the senate to discuss whether they should raise a levy to defend against the Sabines and Aequians, who had just raided Roman territory. Many senators, including Gaius Claudius Sabinus Regillensis the uncle of the leading decemvir Appius Claudius Crassus, denounced this measure and demanded that the decemvirs abdicate from their illegal holding of power and restore the consular government. Offended by this denouncement, the decemvirs turned to Cornelius for his opinion, who advocated for the measures of the decemvirs and reproached the detractors of the decemvirs as being jealous and spiteful of their positions and thus willing to neglect the pressing issues of the state in order to resolve their petty grievances. Cornelius then recommended that the senate allow the decemvirs to carry on the campaign, after which the decemvirs could be compelled to resign and the consular government restored. This sentiment grew to be quite popular among the senators who spoke after Cornelius, in part because they feared the power of the decemvirs. Lucius Valerius Potitus, an enemy of the decemvirs then spoke next, but the details of what he said varies between the sources, with Dionysius of Hallicarnassus stating that he recommended appointing a dictator, while Livy writes that he threatened to take his demands for the decemvirate to be overthrown to the people. Either way however, after Valerius had finished speaking, Cornelius, in fear that the proposal of Valerius would beat out his own, demanded that deliberations be put to an end and voting started. In the end the majority still preferred the proposal of Cornelius, and the decemvirs set out to war against the Sabines and Aequians
