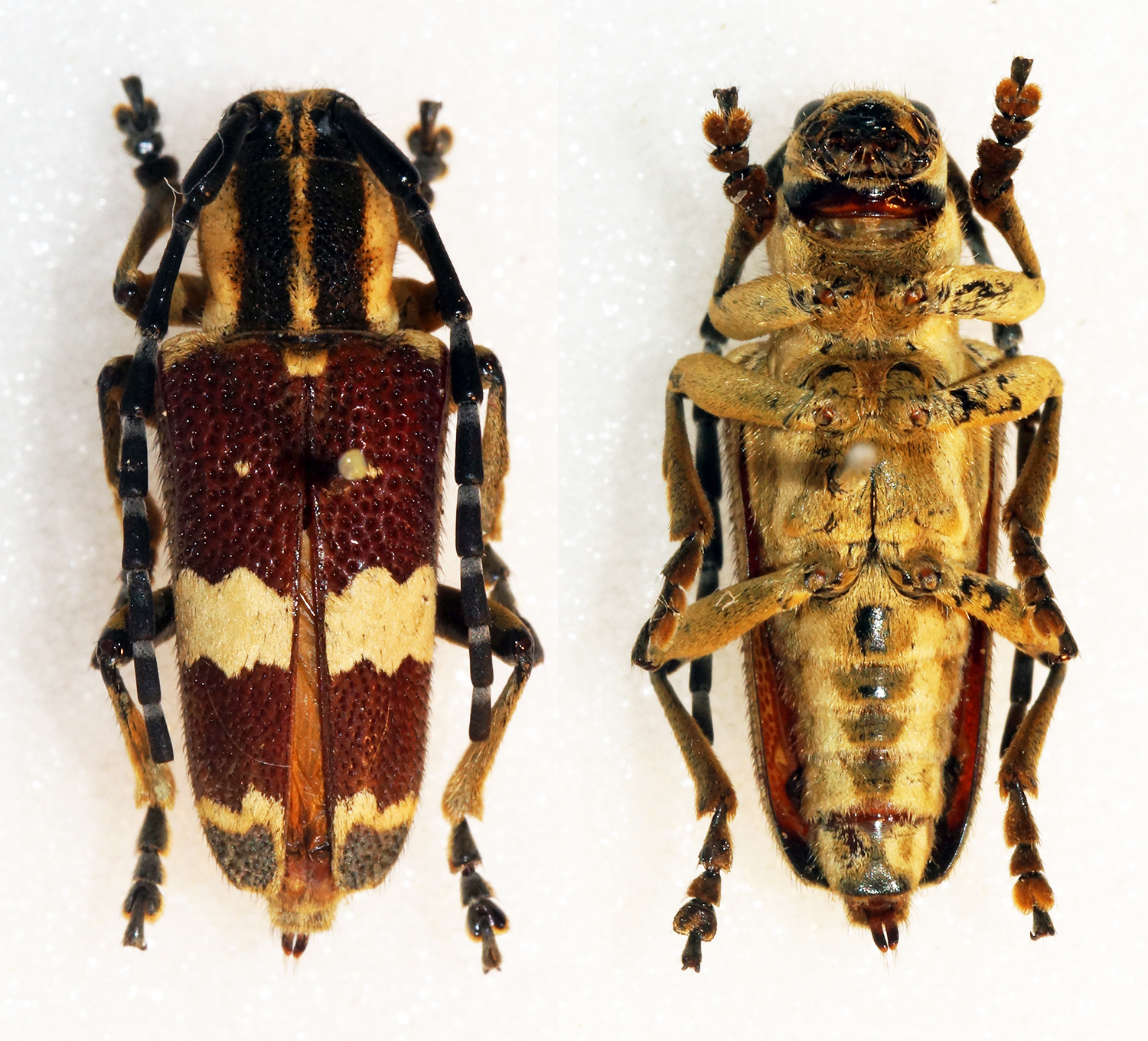

Scientific classification
- Domain: Eukaryota
- Kingdom: Animalia
- Phylum: Arthropoda
- Class: Insecta
- Order: Coleoptera
- Suborder: Polyphaga
- Infraorder: Cucujiformia
- Family: Cerambycidae
- Genus: Glenea
- Species: G. apicalis

Binomial name
- Glenea apicalis (Chevrolat, 1857)

Synonyms
- Saperda apicalis Chevrolat, 1857; Volumnia apicalis (Chevrolat, 1857)

= Glenea apicalis =

Species of beetle

Glenea apicalis is a species of beetle in the family Cerambycidae. It was described by Louis Alexandre Auguste Chevrolat in 1857, originally under the genus Saperda. It has a wide distribution in Africa. It feeds on Hibiscus rosa-sinensis.

== Varietas ==
- Glenea apicalis var. guineensis (Chevrolat, 1861)
- Glenea apicalis var. westermannii (Thomson, 1860)
