= Lido di Cincinnato (Anzio), Italy =

Cincinnato is a small sea side vacation area in the Lazio region of Italy, 50 kilometres (31 mi) southwest of Rome. It is part of the municipality of Anzio. The area consists mainly of summer vacation homes and beach clubs serving Romans.

The name derives from Lucius Quinctius Cincinnatus (519 BC – 438 BC), an aristocrat and political figure of the Roman Republic, serving as consul in 460 BC and Roman dictator in 458 BC and 439 BC.

Cincinnato adjoins the 42-hectare (104-acre) regional park of Tor Caldara, which features a medieval watch tower that was built in the Middle Ages to defend the area from the frequent incursions of Saracens and later from the Arabic pirates. In 1565 the tower was restored by Marcantonio Colonna, of the powerful noble family and large fief holders in Lazio and the Papal States. Sulfur was also mined there in the 16th century. In 1999 the ruins of an ancient Roman villa were discovered adjacent to the tower. The park features evergreen oak trees and Mediterranean vegetation that before commercial development extended along the whole coastline of the region. Characteristic springs and water courses can be found in the area.

During World War II, Allied soldiers fought and died on the beach and in the surrounding countryside of this area. On January 22, 1944, it was the approximate location of the British beachhead landing during the Battle of Anzio, part of the Allied advance to Rome. A greater number of American forces landed in Anzio and Nettuno, 10 kilometres (6 mi) south. A total of 110,000 troops landed.
