= Gaius Servilius Ahala =

5th-century BC Roman senator

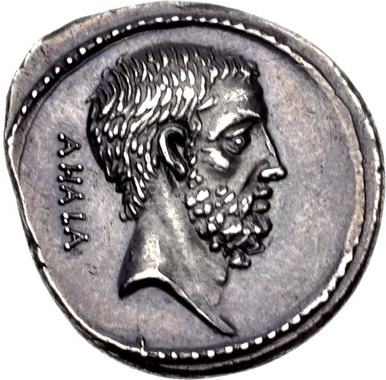
Denarius with the portrait of Ahala, minted in 54 BC by Marcus Junius Brutus, who claimed descent from him.

Gaius Servilius Ahala (fl. 439 BC) was a 5th-century BC politician of ancient Rome, considered by many later writers to have been a hero. His fame rested on the contention that he saved Rome from Spurius Maelius in 439 BC by killing him with a dagger concealed under an armpit. This may be less historical fact and more etiological myth, invented to explain the Servilian cognomen "Ahala"/"Axilla", which means "armpit" and is probably of Etruscan origin.

As related by Livy and others, Ahala served as magister equitum in 439 BC, when Cincinnatus was appointed dictator on the supposition that Spurius Maelius was styling himself a king and plotting against the state. During the night on which the dictator was appointed, the capitol and all the strong posts were garrisoned by the partisans of the patricians. In the morning, when the people assembled in the forum, with Spurius Maelius among them, Ahala summoned the latter to appear before the dictator. When Maelius disobeyed and took refuge in the crowd, Ahala rushed into the throng and killed him.

This is mentioned by several later writers as an example of ancient Roman heroism, and is frequently referred to by Cicero in terms of the highest admiration; but was regarded as a case of murder at the time. Ahala was brought to trial, and only escaped condemnation by going into voluntary exile. Livy passes over this, and only mentions that a bill was brought in three years afterwards, in 436 BC, by another Spurius Maelius, a tribune, for confiscating the property of Ahala, but that it failed.

In 54 BC, a representation of Ahala was given on a coin of Marcus Junius Brutus, who participated in the murder of Julius Caesar, but we cannot suppose it to be anything more than an imaginary likeness. Brutus claimed (perhaps baselessly) that he was descended from Lucius Junius Brutus, the first consul, on his father's side, and from Ahala on his mother's, and thus was sprung from two tyrannicides. The head of Brutus on the annexed coin is therefore intended to represent the first consul.

Plutarch says, in his life of Brutus, that Brutus' mother Servilia was a descendant of Servilius Ahala, and the ancestral example was an inspiration for his assassination of Julius Caesar.

== See also ==
- Servilia gens

== Bibliography ==
- Michael Crawford, Roman Republican Coinage, Cambridge University Press, 1974.
