= Quintus Minucius Esquilinus =

5th-century BC Roman politician and general

Quintus Minucius Esquilinus (fl. c. 457 BC) was, according to tradition, a Roman politician and general from the early Republic, who served as consul in 457 BC as the colleague of Gaius Horatius Pulvillus. During his term of office, a military threat from the Aequi and then the Sabines was said to have prevented internal conflict between the patricians and plebeians (Livy, 3.30). Minucius marched with a force against the Sabines, but was unable to bring the enemy to battle.

Although most ancient sources agree that the consul of this year was called Quintus Minucius, the historian Diodorus Siculus instead named "Lucius Postumius" in his place. Beloch was inclined to accept this and to regard Minucius as an interpolation from later times. According to the Fasti Capitolini, an inscribed list of magistrates set up in the Roman Forum by the Emperor Augustus, Quintus Minucius was brother and successor in office of Lucius Minucius Esquilinus Augurinus, and probably son of Publius Minucius Augurinus, consul in 492 BC. The inscribed stone omits for Quintus the usual family surname Augurinus (which is thought to be a falsification), while two late Roman sources for unknown reasons call him Hilarius or Hilarianus instead. Münzer suggests that the ancient lists may have contained more names, which were lost at some point.

Political offices
Preceded by Gaius Nautius II; Lucius Minucius	Roman consul 457 BC with Gaius Horatius II	Succeeded by Marcus Valerius; Spurius Verginius
