= Volumnia =

Character in Shakespeare's play Coriolanus

- Coriolanus character
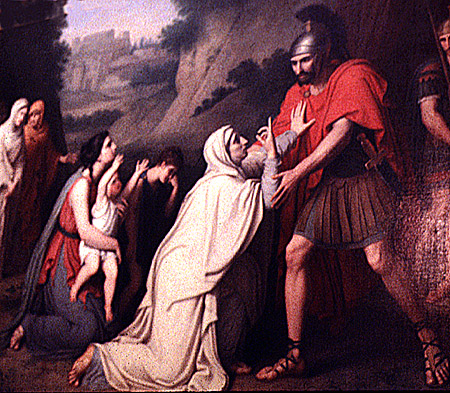
- Veturia at the Feet of Coriolanus by Gaspare Landi. Shakespeare follows Plutarch and his Parallel Lives where Coriolanus's mother is named Volumnia.
- Created by: William Shakespeare
- Based on: Veturia
- Portrayed by: Beatrix Lehmann (1963); Irene Worth (1984); Vanessa Redgrave (2011)

In-universe information
- Family: Coriolanus, her son; Virgilia, her daughter-in-law

Volumnia is a character in William Shakespeare's play Coriolanus, the mother of Caius Martius Coriolanus. She plays a large role in Coriolanus' life, encouraging him in his military success and urging him to seek political office. When the people of Rome put her son in exile and he joins their military enemies, she manages to persuade him not to besiege Rome and becomes a heroine to the city.

Scholars have noted her profound control over her son and her effect on his attitude towards life throughout the play. Rather than offering nourishment, Volumnia constantly urges her son towards aggression. Psychoanalytic literary scholars even suggest that she protects him as if he were her sexual partner, even keeping Coriolanus' own wife away from him. Performance of the role has changed over time as focus shifted from male roles to female roles. During the Romantic Period, she was portrayed as a stately, calm woman. More recently roles have made her much more emotive. Act 1, scene 3 also separates her from the other women in the play: Volumnia speaks of "blood", "swords", and "death", while women like Virgilia speak of "sewing" and "butter".

== Role in the play ==
... Say my request's unjust,
And spurn me back: but if it be not so,
Thou art not honest; and the gods will plague thee,
That thou restrain'st from me the duty which
To a mother's part belongs. ...
– Volumnia reasoning with Coriolanus

Volumnia first appears in act 1, scene 3, with her daughter-in-law, Virgilia. Coriolanus recently joined the war against the Volscians, and while the two sit at home sewing, they discuss their fears about him. Virgilia is much more apprehensive of the war than Volumnia, who thinks it honourable to have a son so renowned in battle. She says she would rather he die in battle than avoid it in fear and shame. In violent and bloody terms, she describes to Virgilia what she envisions her son doing at that moment: leading the Roman troops forward and crushing the Volscian leader, Aufidius. She then praises her grandson, Martius, for being like his father in love for war. When Virgilia says that she will not go outside until Coriolanus comes home, she tries, unsuccessfully, to change her mind, saying that she should be proud of such a husband.

Coriolanus returns in the first scene of the next act, and Volumnia, along with Virgilia and Menenius (a friend of Coriolanus) await him in Rome. She is overjoyed on reading of his deeds in battle in a letter he wrote her. When she hears that he received wounds, she says, "I thank the gods for't." She adds the wounds to the ones he received earlier, saying that he now has 27 wounds. When her son arrives, she praises him for his great deeds, saying he has fulfilled all her wishes for him except one: that he be appointed a Roman consul. This wish is now easily within reach, she says, because his wounds will persuade the people to support him.

In act 3, after Coriolanus is accused of treason because of some poorly-chosen words, he retreats to his home and discusses his predicament with his mother and a few friends. Volumnia chides him for not waiting until after he had been chosen as consul before speaking his mind to the people. She urges him to go back and apologise, using milder words. Coriolanus tries and fails to follow the advice, and is banished from Rome. Volumnia is at the gate when he is sent away, and curses the people of Rome for making her son an outcast. When Sicinius and Brutus, the ones who led the people against Coriolanus, appear, she rails on them. She tells them that his deeds for Rome make theirs a mere nothing, and that they had no right to judge so great a man as her son. They leave, viewing her words as the rants of a madwoman. On leaving, Coriolanus joins the Volscians and destroys several Roman towns, eventually coming to the gates of Rome. In a final effort, the Romans send Volumnia to persuade her son to be merciful, as he has refused all other messengers.

In act 5, Volumnia, Virgilia, Valeria, and Coriolanus' son go to Coriolanus and beg him to stop his attack. Volumnia is the most vocal of the party, and says that if he attacks Rome, there is no honour for them whether he win or lose. She convinces him to agree to a treaty between the Romans and Volscians, and bring peace to both countries. On her successful return, she is hailed by all as the saviour of Rome.

== Criticism ==
...the breasts of Hecuba,
When she did suckle Hector, look'd not lovelier
Than Hector's forehead when it spit forth blood
At Grecian sword, contemning. Tell Valeria,
We are fit to bid her welcome.
– Volumnia

Psychoanalytic critics read Coriolanus largely through his relationship through his mother. In their view, Volumnia never let him accept nourishment as he grew up, always expecting him to achieve. Thus, when Cominius, the general, tries to praise him, Coriolanus refuses to listen to it or accept it. Instead, Coriolanus channels his desire for nourishment into more and more aggression. Such scholars even suggest that Volumnia guards Coriolanus as if he were her sexual partner, jealously refusing him sexual contact with his wife, and urging him on to war. Coriolanus himself describes war in sexual terms, as it may be his only outlet for such emotions. She so thoroughly dominates his marriage, his posterity, and his life, that he has little choice.

== Performances ==
Actresses' portrayals of Volumnia have varied widely over the centuries. During the Romantic era she was portrayed as a stately Roman woman, calm and under control. Later portrayals, continuing into the modern day, portray her as fiery and energetic. This causes her role in the play to rival Coriolanus' in importance. In her final appearance, especially, there is ample room for interpretation. Her only stage instructions are to walk across the stage as the crowds cheer her victory in stopping Coriolanus. Some actresses have been overjoyed and accepting of the praise in this scene. Others have taken a quieter approach, merely nodding and smiling slightly, trying to avoid the praise. The latter portrayal is largely the effect of psychoanalytic treatment of the play, portraying the mother as one who refuses nurture and praise.

Notable portrayals include:

- Beatrix Lehmann in The Spread of the Eagle (1963, BBC)
- Irene Worth in The Tragedy of Coriolanus (1984, BBC Television Shakespeare)
- Vanessa Redgrave in Coriolanus (2011, directed by/starring Ralph Fiennes)
