= Appius Herdonius =

5th-century BC Sabine chieftain

Appius Herdonius (died 460 BC) was a Sabine who led an uprising against Rome at the head of slaves and exiles. With his troops, he managed, in 460 BC, to seize the Capitoline Hill and Arx at night. According to Livy, Herdonius appeared from the top of the Capitoline walls and appealed to all the slaves and uprooted of Rome. Its objective would be to "return their homeland to the exiles unjustly banished and to take away from the slaves their overwhelming yoke”.

The tribunes of the plebs opposed the consuls who wanted to end the uprising and who had distributed weapons to the people. According to the tribunes, the capture of the Capitol was only an invention of the patricians intended to avoid the vote of the Lex Terentilia, which provided for the creation of a commission to put consular rights in writing in order to limit the arbitrariness of the power of consuls and which would ultimately lead to the Law of the Twelve Tables.

The consul Publius Valerius Publicola in a long speech exhorted the plebeians to help the patricians defeat Herdonius, playing to the religiosity of the Romans by stating that the temples of the gods were being held hostage by hostile marauders as well as promising to push for their desired reforms if their aid was granted. His speech appeased the plebeians and most soon vowed to combat the revolt.

At the announcement of the capture of the citadel of Rome at Tusculum, its dictator Lucius Mamilius, sent a detachment to support the Romans. The consul Poplicola formed an army; the other consul, Gaius Claudius Sabinus, was charged with guarding the gates of Rome. The Romans and their Tusculan allies then launched the assault and regained control of the Capitol and the citadel of the Arx. Publicola and Herdonius were slain in the fighting. A good number of the insurgents were captured and executed.
