= Servius Sulpicius Camerinus Cornutus =

Roman politician who was consul in 500 BC

Servius Sulpicius Camerinus Cornutus (fl. c. 500–463 BC) was consul at Rome in the year 500 BC with Manius Tullius Longus.

Livy reports that no important events occurred during this year, but Dionysius of Halicarnassus states that Camerinus detected and crushed a conspiracy to restore the Tarquins to power and fought the Fidenae. His fellow-consul Tullius died during Ludi Romani that year, leaving him as sole ruler. As an ex-consul he was selected to be one of the ten envoys sent by the senate to treat with the plebeians during the first secessio plebis.

Camerinus was the first consul of the patrician family of the Sulpicii, which may have taken its name from the town of Cameria or Camerium in Latium. He was the father of Quintus Sulpicius Camerinus Cornutus, consul in 490 BC. He was also the first man to be clearly identified in ancient literature as a curio maximus, holding the office in 463 BC.

== Notes ==
Political offices
Preceded by Postumus Cominius Auruncus; Titus Larcius	Roman consul with Manius Tullius Longus; 500 BC	Succeeded by Titus Aebutius Helva; Gaius Veturius Geminus Cicurinus
