= Lucius Quinctius Cincinnatus =

Roman politician and military figure (c. 519 – c. 430 BC)

- Born: c. 519 BC
- Died: c. 430 BC (aged c. 89)
- Office: Consul (460 BC); Dictator (458, 439 BC)
- Spouse: Racilia
- Children: Caeso Quinctius; Lucius Quinctius Cincinnatus; Titus Quinctius Poenus Cincinnatus
- Family: Quinctia gens

Military service
- Battles/wars: Battle of Mount Algidus (458 BC)

Lucius Quinctius Cincinnatus (c. 519 – c. 430 BC) was a Roman patrician, statesman, and military leader of the early Roman Republic who became a famous model of Roman virtue—particularly civic virtue—by the time of the late Republic.

Modern historians question some particulars of the story of Cincinnatus that was recounted in Livy's History of Rome and elsewhere, but it is usually accepted that Cincinnatus was a historical figure who served as suffect consul in 460 BC and as dictator in 458 BC and (possibly) again in 439 BC.

The most famous story related to Cincinnatus occurs after his retirement from public service to a simple life of farming. As Roman forces struggled to defeat the Aequi, Cincinnatus was summoned from his plough to assume complete control over the state. After achieving a swift victory in sixteen days, Cincinnatus relinquished power and its privileges, returning to labor on his farm.

Cincinnatus’s success and his immediate resignation of near-absolute authority at the end of the crisis (traditionally dated to 458 BC) has often been cited as a model of selfless leadership, civic virtue, and service to the greater good. The story has also been seen as an exemplar of agrarian virtues like humility, modesty, and hard work. Cincinnatus was also an opponent of the rights of the plebeians (the common citizens). His son, Caeso Quinctius, caused the plebeians to fall into poverty when he violently opposed their desire to have a written code of equally enforced laws.

== Life ==
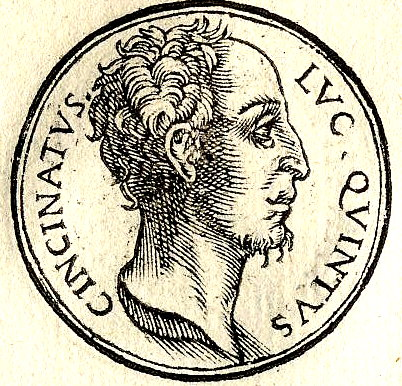
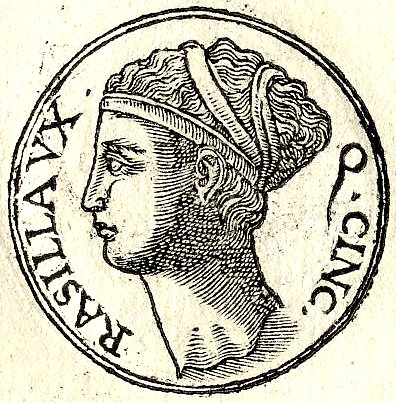
1553 French portraits of Cincinnatus and his wife Racilia or Rasilia

According to the traditional accounts, Lucius Quinctius Cincinnatus was probably born around 519 BC, during the last decade of the Roman Kingdom. He would have been a member of the ancient patrician clan Quinctia, which predated the founding of Rome and was moved to Rome from the Latin city of Alba Longa by Tullus Hostilius. The clan's first consul was Titus Quinctius Capitolinus Barbatus, elected in 471 BC. As both Titus and Lucius were recorded as the son and grandson of men named Lucius Quinctius, Titus is sometimes thought to have been Lucius's brother. This suggests Lucius was the first of his cognomen Cincinnatus, meaning "the curly haired". The family was rich.

In the late 460s BC, Rome was fending off raids by the Aequi to their east. Beginning in 462 BC, the tribune G. Terentilius Harsa began pressing for codification of the Roman laws to establish a kind of constitution that would check the near-regal power of the patrician consuls. In the years that followed, he and the other plebeians were ignored, fended off, rejected on procedural grounds, and finally beaten and driven from the streets by gangs of patricians and their clients, supposedly including Cincinnatus's son Caeso.

The violent resistance of the patricians prompted so much unrest that Appius Herdonius was able to seize the Capitoline Hill and hold it against the city with a gang of outlaws and rebel slaves (in Livy) or with an army of Sabines (in Dionysius). The consul Publius Valerius Poplicola was killed in its recovery in 460 BC and Cincinnatus, probably illegally, became the suffect ("replacement") consul for the remainder of the year. Cincinnatus was himself a violent opponent of the plebs' proposal, which made no progress during his administration. His son was supposedly driven from town and killed for his murder of a plebeian. Cincinnatus quit the city and retired to an estate he held to the west of the Tiber.

Cincinnatus served as dictator, a king-like figure appointed by the Republic in times of extreme emergency, in 458 or 457 BC in order to lead reinforcements to the defense of the Roman army under the consul L. Minucius Esquilinus Augurinus at Mount Algidus. (Note: Cicero, apparently mistakenly, places these events in Cincinnatus's second dictatorship.) Many of the details of the story are now assumed to be spurious and some consider the entire military account fictional, believing its parallels with T. Quinctius Cincinnatus's 380 BC defeat of Praeneste and Fabius the Delayer's 217 BC rescue of M. Minucius Rufus from Hannibal too great for chance. In one account, Cincinnatus took advantage of his position as dictator to hold a hearing, despite the objections of the tribunes, in which his son's accuser Marcus Volscius was charged with perjury, driving him into exile. (Note: The accusations against Volscius are sometimes placed in 459 BC and credited to the patricians as a class, rather than to Cincinnatus himself, although this seems to have been a later fabrication.)

During the decemvirate, Cincinnatus ran unsuccessfully for a position in that government in 450 BC. Livy noted his involvement in the discussion about opening the consulship to plebeians.

Cincinnatus may have returned to serve as dictator in 439 BC to defend Rome against the conspiracy the prefect L. Minucius Augurinus alleged Spurius Maelius was plotting against the Republic. When Spurius Maelius ignored his summons, he was killed by Cincinnatus's master of horse (Gaius Servilius Ahala) and any plot collapsed. Cincinnatus presumably died sometime soon afterwards.

== Legend ==
=== Son of Lucius Quinctius Cincinnatus ===
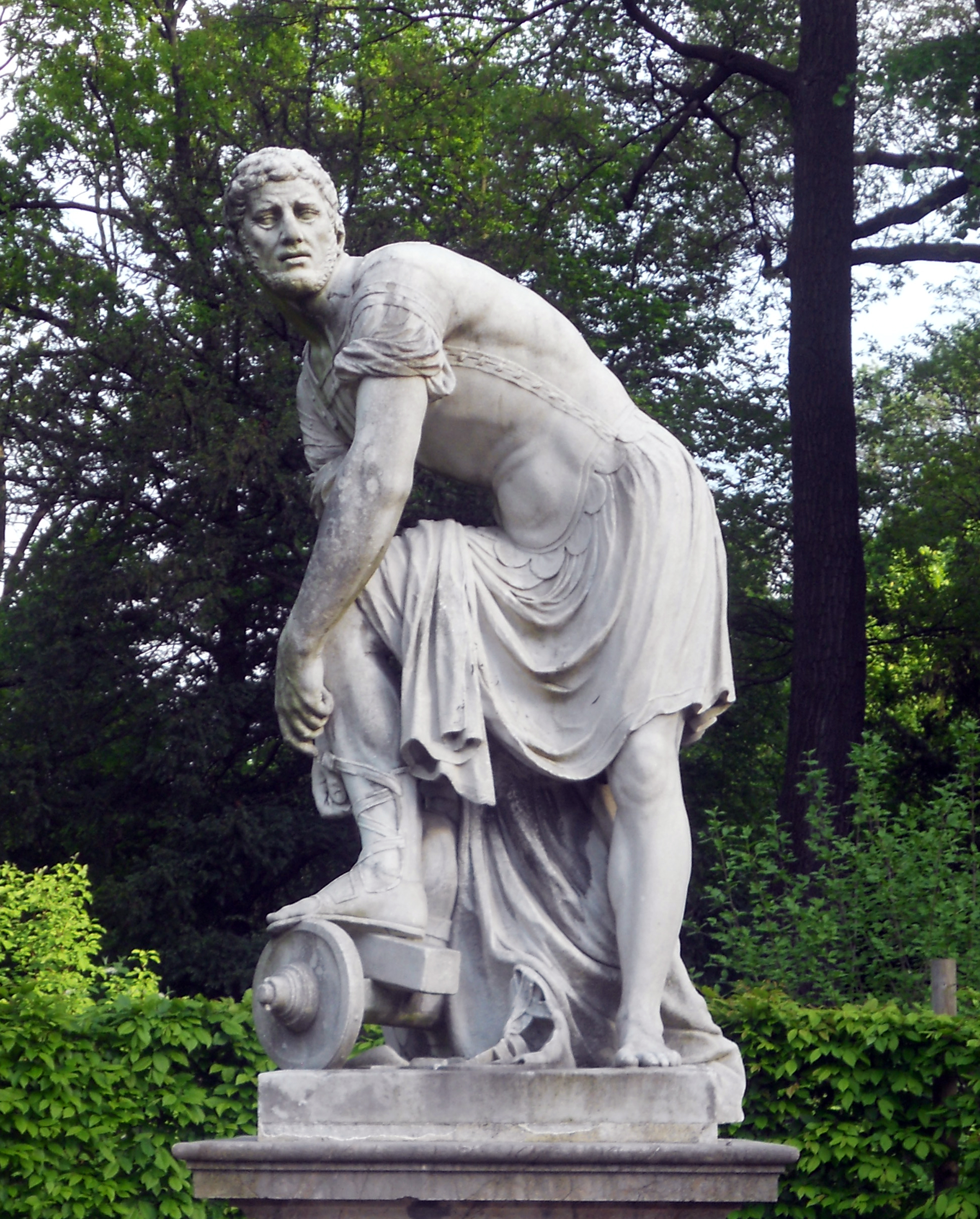
The sculpture of Cincinnatus in Vienna's Schönbrunn Garden

In the traditional accounts of the story, Cincinnatus's son Caeso was an openly violent opponent of the attempts of the plebeians to enact the Terentilian Law, which sought to codify the Roman legal tradition and circumscribe the authority of the patrician consuls. Caeso would lead gangs to drive the Tribunes of the Plebs from the Forum, disrupting the procedures necessary to approve it. He was brought up on capital charges in 461 BC but released on a large bail. A plebeian named Marcus Volscius testified that his brother, while feeble from sickness, had been knocked down and injured by Caeso with such force that he later died. Rather than face his accusers in court, Caeso fled to the Etruscans. He was then condemned to death in absentia and his father subjected to a huge punitive fine, forcing him to sell most of his estates and to retire from public life to personally work a small farm (some accounts say Caeso was killed with Poplicola in the recovery of the Capitoline from Herdonius). Modern historians particularly reject the fine as a later invention inserted to explain the dictator's supposed poverty and heighten his virtues. Some reject the story in its entirety.

=== First dictatorship ===
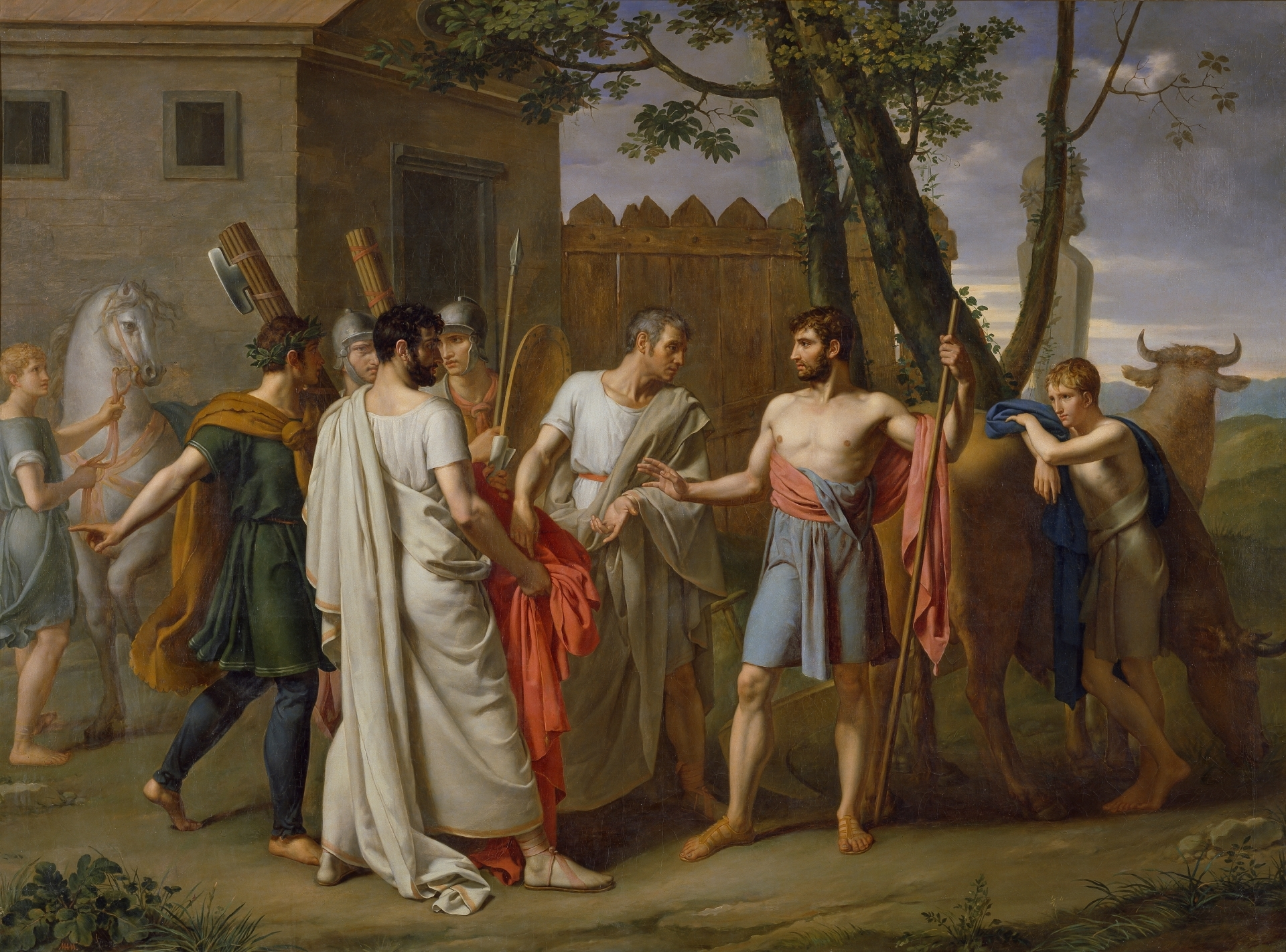
Juan Antonio Ribera's c. 1806 Cincinnatus Leaves the Plough to Dictate Laws to Rome

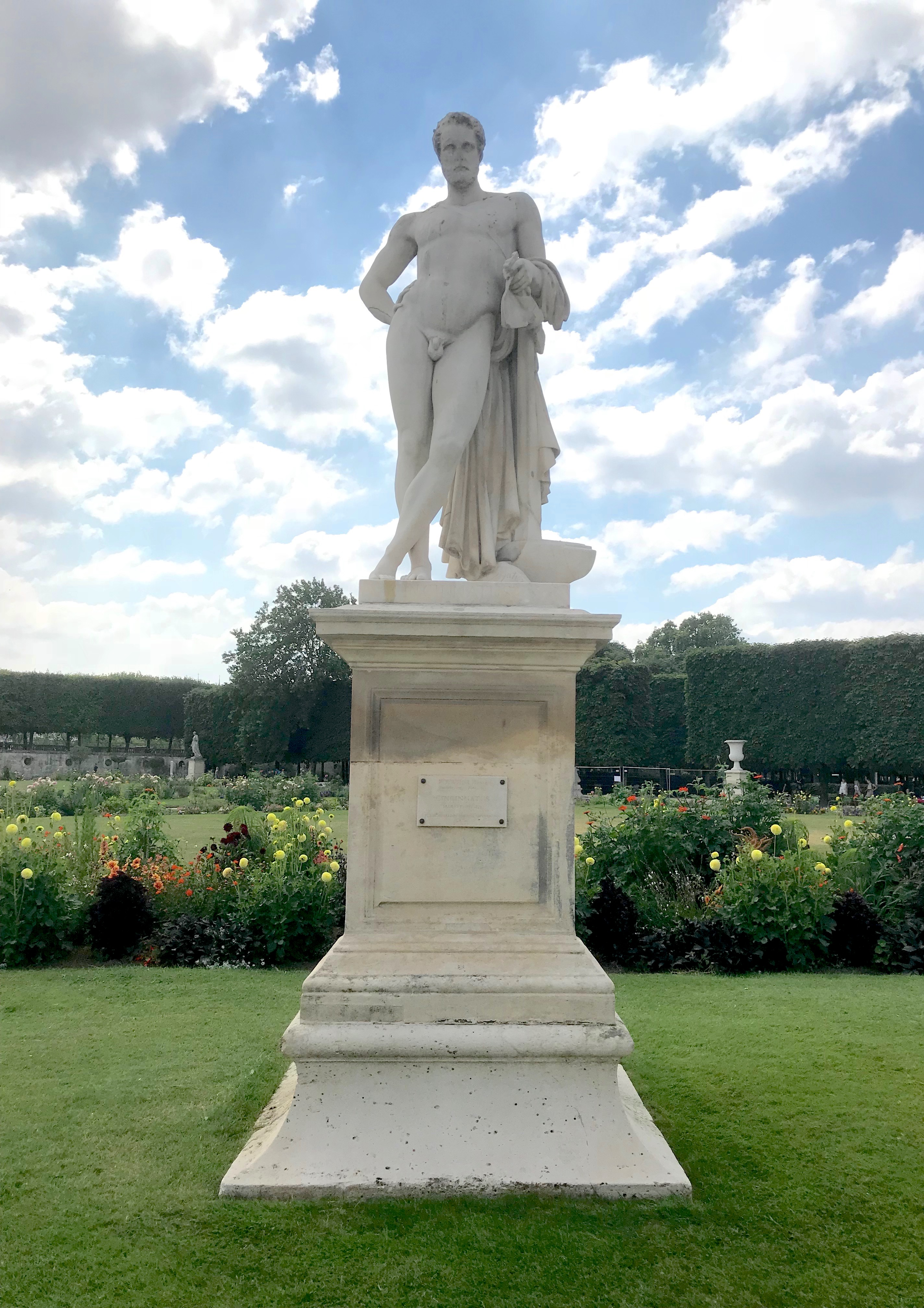
Lucius Quinctius Cincinnatus by Denis Foyatier (1793–1863) Tuileries Garden, Paris

In 458 BC, the Aequi to Rome's east broke their treaty of the year before and attempted to retake Tusculum (Frascati). The consuls for the year—L. Minucius Esquilinus Augurinus and G. Nautius Rutilus—led out two armies, one to Tusculum's relief and another to strike against the lands of the Aequi and their Sabine allies. Upon reaching Mount Algidus in the Alban Hills, the army under L. Minucius Esquilinus Augurinus encamped and rested instead of immediately attacking. The Aequi quickly deployed around their position and successfully besieged them, with only five horsemen escaping to tell the Roman Senate what had happened. With the army of the second consul unable to help, the senators fell into a panic and authorized the nomination of a dictator. G. Nautius Rutilus or Horatius Pulvillus named Cincinnatus for a term of six months.

A group of senators was sent to Cincinnatus to inform him of his appointment, finding him ploughing his farm. (Note: This story is sometimes told of his election as consul.) He asked them, "Is everything all right?" and they replied that they hoped "it might turn out well for both him and his country", asking that he don his senatorial toga before hearing the Senate's mandate. He then called out to his wife Racilia, telling her to bring his toga from their cottage. Once he was properly dressed, the delegation hailed him as a dictator and ordered him to come to the city. He crossed the Tiber in one of the senate's boats and was greeted on his return by his three sons and most of the senators. He was given several lictors for protection and enforcement of his orders.

The next morning, Cincinnatus went to the Forum and named Lucius Tarquitius as his master of the horse. He then went to the assembly of the people and ordered every man of military age to appear on the Field of Mars (Campus Martius) by the end of the day with twelve times the normal number of encamping spikes. They then marched to the relief of the consul's relieving army. At the Battle of Mount Algidus, they used their spikes to quickly besiege the besieging Aequi. Rather than slaughter them between the two Roman camps, Cincinnatus accepted their pleas for mercy and offered an amnesty provided that three principal offenders were executed, and Gracchus Cloelius and their other leaders be delivered to him in chains. A "yoke" of three spears was then set up and the Aequi made to pass under it as an act of submission, bowing and admitting their defeat. Cincinnatus then disbanded his army and returned to his farm, abandoning his control a mere fifteen days after it had been granted to him.

=== Second dictatorship ===
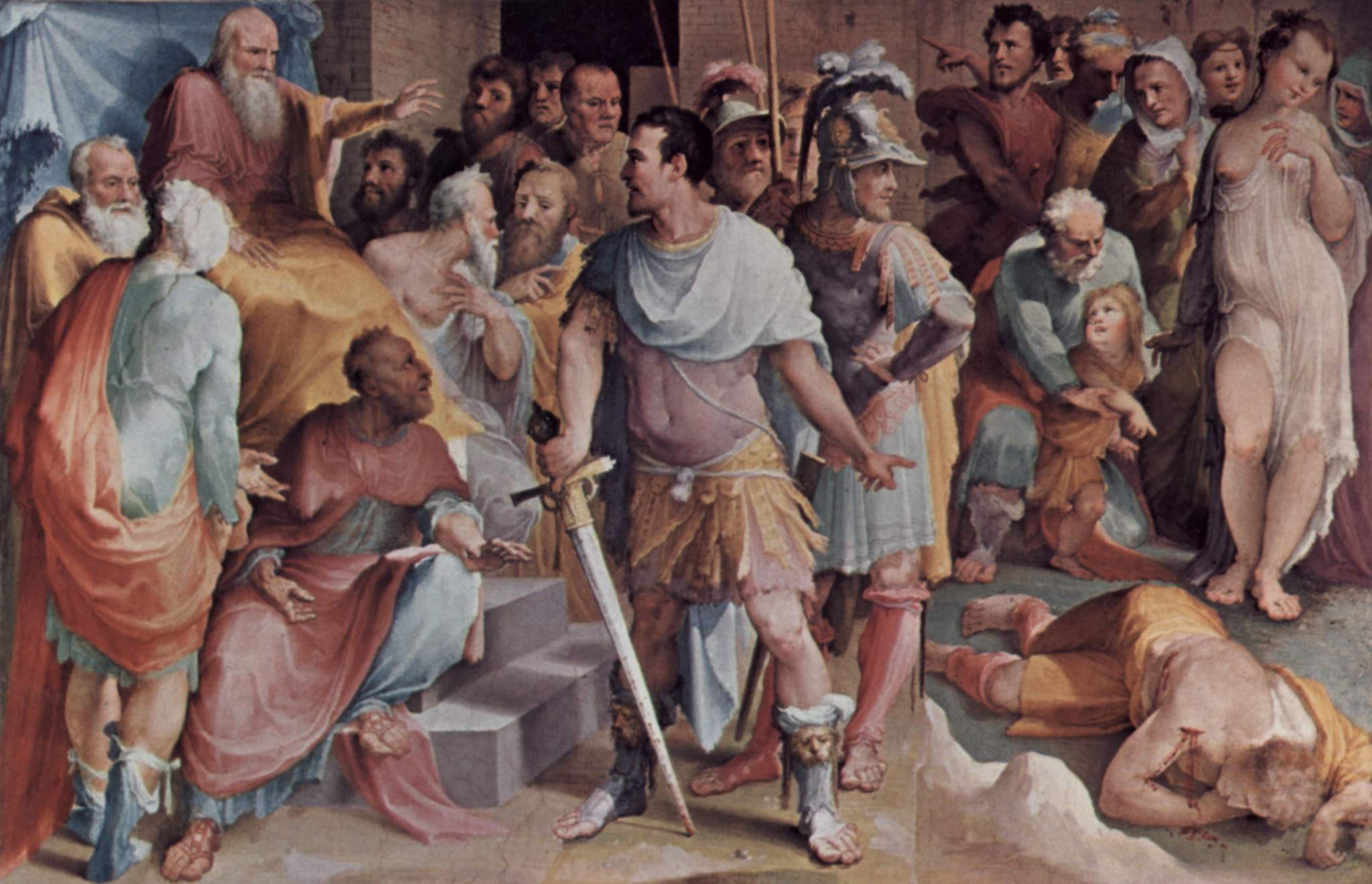
Beccafumi's Ahala, Master of the Horse, Presents the Dead Maelius to Cincinnatus, a fresco in Siena's Public Palace

On the nomination of his brother or nephew Titus Quinctius Capitolinus Barbatus, Cincinnatus came out of retirement for a second term as dictator in 439 BC to deal with the feared plot of the wealthy plebeian Spurius Maelius to buy the loyalty of the poor and establish himself as king over Rome. Cincinnatus named C. Servilius Ahala his master of the horse and directed him to bring Spurius Maelius before him. He and the other patricians then garrisoned the Capitoline Hill and other strongholds around the city. Maelius fended off Ahala's officer with a butcher's knife and fled into a crowd. Ahala led a band of patricians into the crowd and killed him during his flight. With the crisis resolved, Cincinnatus again resigned his commission, having served 21 days (Ahala was later brought to trial for exceeding his commission and accepted voluntary exile). Various aspects of the story are connected with spurious etiological legends and it may have no more connection to the dictator of 458 BC than the fact that the Cincinnatus of 439 BC was a member of the same clan.

=== Other legends ===
Cincinnatus became a legend to the Romans. Twice granted supreme power, he held on to it for not a day longer than absolutely necessary. He consistently demonstrated great honour and integrity. The high esteem in which he was held by the later Romans is sometimes extended to his family. One legend from the end of his life claims a Capitolinus defended one of his sons from a charge of military incompetence by asking the jury who would go to tell the aged Cincinnatus the news in the event of a conviction. The son was said to have been acquitted because the jury could not bring itself to break the old man's heart.

== Legacy ==
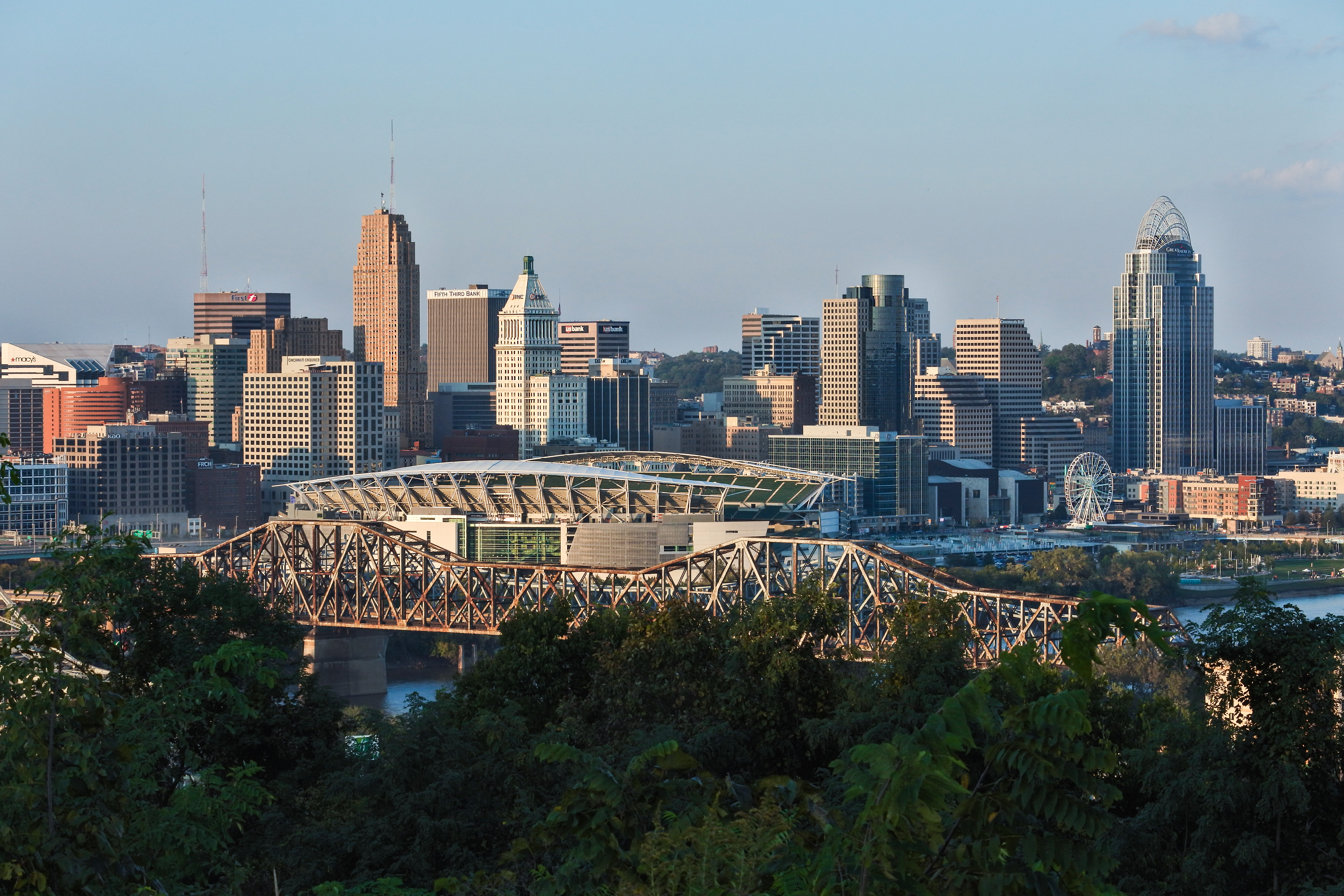
Cincinnati, the 64th-most populous city in the United States

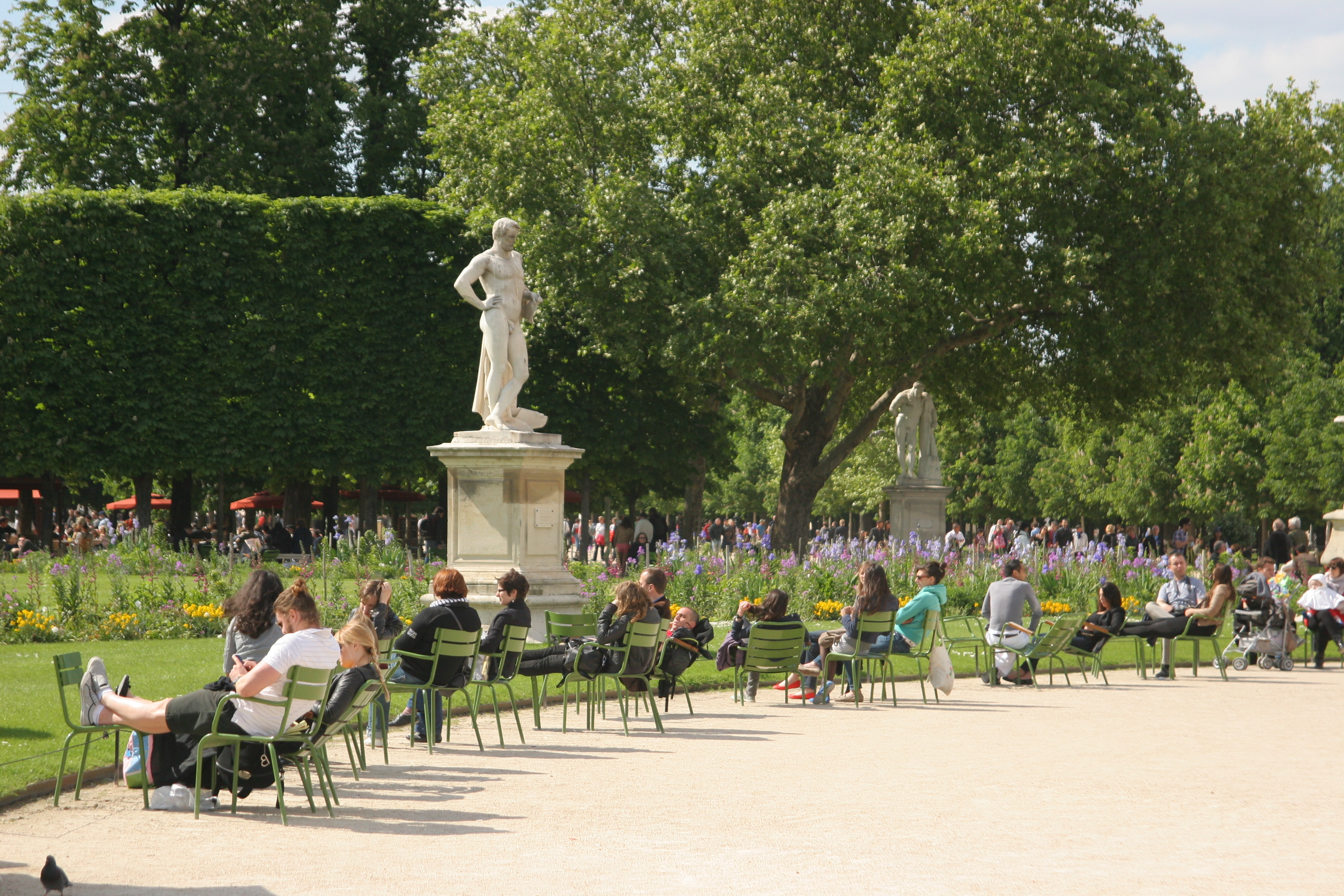
The statue of Cincinnatus in Paris' Tuileries Garden

Many Italian cities have plazas, streets, or other locations named after Cincinnatus (Italian: Cincinnato). The Cincinnato neighborhood in Anzio, Italy is named in his honor.

The legend of Cincinnatus's military victory and subsequent relinquishment of power has continued to inspire admiration. It has also been invoked to honor other political leaders, notably George Washington. Washington's relinquishing of control of the Continental Army, refusal to consider establishing a monarchy or assuming monarchical powers, and voluntary retirement after two terms as president to return to his farm at Mount Vernon have made allusions to Cincinnatus common in historical and literary (Note: For example, in Lord Byron's 1814 "Ode to Napoleon Buonaparte".) treatments of the era.

The Society of the Cincinnati was established by Henry Knox in 1783 to assist the officers of the Continental Army and Navy and their families, to preserve the ideals of the American Revolution, and to maintain the union of the former colonies. A French Society of the Cincinnati was founded soon afterward by King Louis XVI. Cincinnati, Ohio, and Cincinnatus, New York, in the United States, were named in his honor.

Cincinnatus is referenced in Book II, Chapter 1 of Thomas Carlyle's Sartor Resartus. The protagonist of Vladimir Nabokov's Invitation to a Beheading is named Cincinnatus C.

Whistleblower Edward Snowden used the nickname "Cincinnatus" when first contacting journalist Glenn Greenwald about releasing classified National Security Agency (NSA) documents.

British Prime Minister Boris Johnson referred to Cincinnatus in his farewell speech outside 10 Downing Street in London on 6 September 2022. Some commentators noted that while, as Johnson said, Cincinnatus returned to his plough, he was also later recalled to power.

When, in July 2024, United States President Joe Biden announced that he would not run for re-election, multiple political commentators compared him to Cincinnatus, though Biden later stated he was forced out due to pressure from his party.

== See also ==
- Cato the Elder
- List of Roman dictators
- Horatii and Curiatii
- Marcus Atilius Regulus
- Publius Decius Mus (consul 340 BC)

== Notes ==
Political offices
Preceded by P. Valerius Poplicola	Roman consul 460 BC (suffect) with Gaius Claudius Sabinus Regillensis	Succeeded by Q. Fabius Vibulanus; L. Cornelius Maluginensis Uritinus
