= Publius Valerius Poplicola (consul 475 BC) =

Roman politician and general (died c.460 BC)

- Died: 460 BC
- Office: Consul (475, 460 BC)

Publius Valerius Poplicola (died c. 460 BC) was consul of the Roman Republic in 475 BC and 460 BC, and interrex in 462 BC.

== Early life and career ==
Prior to his consulship he was one of the two patricians sent by the senate to Sicily to retrieve grain to save Rome during a famine in 492 BC, returning a year later having succeeded.

== First consulship and Interrex appointment ==
In his first consulship Valerius was assigned responsibility for the war against Veii and the Sabines. The Roman army was reinforced by auxiliaries from the Latin allies and the Hernici.

The Sabine army was camped outside the walls of Veii. Valerius attacked the Sabine defences. The Sabines sallied forth from their camp, but the Romans had the better of the fighting, and took the gate of the Sabine camp. The forces of Veii then attacked from the city, but in some disorder, and a Roman cavalry charged and routed the Veientes, giving Rome the overall victory.

Valerius was awarded a triumph for the victory, which he celebrated on 1 May.

In the aftermath of the pestilence that ravaged Rome in 463 BC (killing both consuls among others) Valerius was appointed interrex to hold the elections of 462 BC.

== Second consulship ==
In his second consulship, enmity between the patricians and plebeians continued from the previous years, with the plebeian tribune Aulus Verginius making allegations that Caeso Quinctius, a prominent patrician who was exiled the previous year, was conspiring against the state and argued that this conspiracy should be investigated so that it might be put down before the rights of the Roman people could be suppressed by patrician tyranny. In response to this, Gaius Claudius Sabinus Regillensis, the consular colleague of Valerius, instead argued that the rumors of this conspiracy were baseless and were in fact contrived by the plebeian tribunes as an excuse to exile patricians who resisted plebeian demands.

This dispute however was interrupted by urgent news of a slave revolt on the Capitoline Hill. This revolt was led by Appius Herdonius, a wealthy Sabine with designs either to break Rome's power or to attain regal authority. Under cover of darkness, Herdonius had seized the Capitoline with a force of around four thousand five hundred slaves and outcasts, slaughtering all who resisted them and summoning all slaves they could find on the Hill to liberty. When the full gravity of the situation became known in the morning, the plebeians refused to help combat this insurgency unless the patricians granted them their long sought reforms. On the other hand, the ardent patricians, led by Gaius Claudius, were of the opinion that it would be preferable to fight off Herdonius without the aid of the vast bulk of the populace, even if foreign aid was required to do so, than to grant the plebeians their reforms. In reaction to such strife occurring even as part of the city was in hostile occupation, Valerius in a long speech exhorted the plebeians to help the patricians defeat Herdonius, playing to the religiosity of the Romans by stating that the temples of the gods were being held hostage by hostile marauders as well as promising to push for their desired reforms if their aid was granted. His speech appeased the plebeians and most soon vowed to combat the revolt. Lots were drawn and Valerius was assigned with the duty of taking on Herdonius on the Capitoline. With the aid of Lucius Mamillius, the dictator of Tusculum, Valerius managed to defeat and kill Appius Herdonius; however in the fighting Valerius himself was killed.

== Lineage ==
He is said to be the son of Publius Valerius Poplicola, the consul of 509 BC, but according to another tradition, that son fell in battle at Lake Regillus in c. 496 BC; perhaps the consul of 475 BC was his grandson.

Political offices
Preceded by Aulus Verginius Tricostus Rutilus; Spurius Servilius Structus	Roman consul 475 BC with Gaius Nautius Rutilus	Succeeded by Lucius Furius Medullinus; Aulus Manlius Vulso
Preceded by Publius Volumnius Amintinus Gallus; Servius Sulpicius Camerinus Cornutus	Roman consul II; 460 BC with Gaius Claudius Sabinus Inregillensis	Succeeded by Lucius Quinctius Cincinnatus
