= Caeso Quinctius =

5th-century BC Roman patrician

Caeso Quinctius L. f. L. n. Cincinnatus (Note: Caeso's name appears in several variations in different sources. The praenomen Caeso is often spelled Kaeso; Quinctius sometimes appears as Quintius; and not all sources mention his cognomen (Livy typically refers to individuals by praenomen and nomen alone, when this was sufficient to distinguish them from others). However, as he was the son of Lucius Quinctius Cincinnatus, whose other descendants used the same cognomen, it would naturally have applied to Caeso as well. As the son and grandson of Lucius Quinctius, his filiation was L. f. L. n.) was a son of the Roman dictator Lucius Quinctius Cincinnatus. His trial for obstructing the tribunes of the plebs in 461 BC was one of the key events in the Conflict of the Orders in the years leading up to the decemvirate.

== Background ==
A scion of the noble patrician house of the Quinctii, Caeso was tall and strong, and had earned a reputation as a fine soldier, to whom several feats of courage and daring were attributed. He was also considered an excellent public speaker. His uncle, Titus Quinctius Capitolinus Barbatus, had been thrice consul, and there was every reason to believe that Caeso would one day hold the same office.

But in the disputes between the patricians and the plebeians, Caeso unreservedly took the side of the aristocratic party, and despite holding no position of authority, he and his followers took it upon themselves to prevent the tribunes of the people from meeting in the forum to conduct their business. If anyone dared oppose them, Caeso and his friends resorted to violence, driving away the plebeians and their representatives.

== Testimony ==
In response, Aulus Verginius, one of the plebeian tribunes, brought the young Quinctius to trial on a capital charge. (Note: It is not entirely clear what the charge was, but the tribunes of the plebs were sacrosanct, and according to the law the entire body of the plebs obliged to defend them with their lives; so preventing the tribunes from meeting, beating or threatening them, especially without any authority, may have been sufficient to constitute a capital charge.) This only seems to have encouraged Caeso to pursue his war against the tribunes more vigorously, further increasing the young man's reputation for violence.

Several prominent men testified in Caeso's defense: his uncle described his nobility and fine personal qualities, as well as his worth as a soldier; Spurius Furius Medullinus described how the young man had rescued him from danger and helped him win a great victory; Lucius Lucretius Tricipitinus, the consul of the preceding year, described Caeso's military exploits and natural gifts, and urged that he not be judged too harshly in light of his age and lack of wisdom; and Caeso's father, Lucius Quinctius, begged forgiveness for his son's excesses.

However, the trial was decided largely on the testimony of Marcus Volscius Fictor, a former tribune, who claimed that Caeso had struck his elder brother, Lucius, during a melee in the Subura. Lucius Volscius was in a weakened state, not fully recovered from the pestilence of 463, and had died as a result of the young nobleman's attack. After Marcus had told this story, the crowd tried to attack Caeso, and was only restrained with difficulty. Verginius ordered his arrest, but Titus Quinctius objected, since Caeso had not yet been tried. (Note: Evidently the testimony given preceded the actual trial.) After some debate, the other tribunes granted Caeso his freedom until the trial could be held, granting bail of 3,000 asses, to be given by ten sureties. (Note: Livy notes this as the first instance of a defendant being freed on bail given by his sureties.)

== Exile and death ==
Believing that he would be convicted based on the tribune Volscius' testimony, as well as his own violent reputation, Quinctius chose exile over a possible sentence of death, and departed for Etruria under cover of darkness. Verginius still wished to try the young man in absentia, but was prevented from doing so when the other tribunes accepted the explanation that Caeso had voluntarily gone into exile, and dismissed the assembly. Nevertheless, the young man's father, Lucius Quinctius, forfeited the sum of 3,000 asses, which required him to sell his house and property. He left Rome and settled in a small house on the other side of the Tiber.

The following year, there was a rumour, apparently unfounded, that Caeso had returned to Rome, at the head of a conspiracy of young noblemen, and aided by the Aequi and Volsci, with the intention of killing the tribunes of the plebs and anyone else who had opposed the aristocracy. In 459, an attempt was made to bring Volscius to trial, on the grounds that his brother had died without ever having recovered enough from the plague to leave his bed, while Caeso had been out of the city at the time. The effort was unsuccessful, but tried again the following year, when Caeso's uncle Titus was quaestor. According to Livy, Volscius was convicted of perjury, and went into exile at Lanuvium, but by this time it appears that Caeso had died, much to his father's grief.

== Historicity ==
In A Critical History of Early Rome, Gary Forsythe suggests that the story of Caeso Quinctius should be regarded as a later addition to the narrative of the conflict of the orders, providing an example of an injustice done to the patricians, and adding colour to the story of his father's stoic attitude and subsequent redemption.

== See also ==
- Quinctia gens

== Bibliography ==
- Dionysius of Halicarnassus, Romaike Archaiologia (Roman Antiquities).
- Titus Livius (Livy), History of Rome.
- Gary Forsythe, A Critical History of Early Rome: From Prehistory to the First Punic War, University of California Press, Berkeley (2006).
