= Gaius Terentilius Harsa =

5th-century BC Roman tribune of the plebs and jurist

Gaius Terentilius Harsa or Caius Terentilius Arsa (Note: His name appears as Terentius in Dionysius.) was a Tribune of the Plebs of the early Roman Republic in about 462 BC. In 467 BC, Gaius agitated the plebeians to limit the power of consuls.

== Treason ==
Thinking that the absence of the consuls afforded a good opportunity for tribunitian agitation, he spent several days in haranguing the plebeians on the overbearing arrogance of the patricians. In particular, he inveighed against the authority of the consuls as excessive and intolerable in a free commonwealth, for whilst in the name it was less invidious, in reality, it was almost more harsh and oppressive than that of the kings had been, for now, he said, they had two masters instead of one, with uncontrolled, unlimited powers, who, with nothing to curb their licence, directed all the threats and penalties of the laws against the plebeians. To prevent this unfettered tyranny from lasting forever, he said he would propose an enactment that a commission of five should be appointed to draw up in writing the laws which regulated the power of the consuls. Whatever jurisdiction over themselves the people gave the consul, that and that only was he to exercise; he was not to regard his own licence and caprice as law.

When this measure was promulgated, the patricians were apprehensive lest in the absence of the consuls they might have to accept the yoke. A meeting of the senate was convened by Q. Fabius, the prefect of the city. He made such a violent attack upon the proposed law and its author, that the threats and intimidation could not have been greater even if the two consuls had been standing by the tribune, threatening his life. He accused him of plotting treason, of seizing a favourable moment for compassing the ruin of the commonwealth. Terentilius demanded a written constitution to define and limit the powers of the consul. Terentilius claimed that consuls abused their powers and acted with more freedom than kings.

== Life ==
Terentilius agitated for a formal code of laws in the early days of the Roman Republic. He took advantage of the fact that the consuls were away on a campaign against the Volsci to pressure the Roman Senate, controlled by patricians, for the code.

The patricians made a show of making peace with Terentilius, but in fact had no intention of codifying the laws at his request. The later Florentine writer Niccolò Machiavelli commented that this was similar to the Florentine 'Ten of War' that was eventually reinstated once the people realized it was the excessive abuse of authority that was despised, not the title or function of the office itself.

The story of Terentilius comes to us from one source, Book III of Livy's History.

== See also ==
- Conflict of the Orders
- Twelve Tables
- Terentilia gens
