= Titus Genucius Augurinus =

5th-century BC Roman politician, consul and decemvir

Consul of the Roman Republic
- In office 1 August 451 BC – 451 BC Serving with Appius Claudius Crassus
- Preceded by: Publius Sestius Capitolinus Vaticanus; Titus Menenius Lanatus
- Succeeded by: First College of Decemvirs

First College of Decemvirs
- In office 451 BC – 450 BC Serving with Aulus Manlius Vulso; Appius Claudius Crassus; Servius Sulpicius Camerinus Cornutus; Titus Veturius Geminus Cicurinus; Publius Curiatius Fistus Trigeminus; Publius Sestius Capitolinus Vaticanus; Titus Romilius Rocus Vaticanus; Gaius Julius Iulus; Spurius Postumius Albus Regillensis
- Preceded by: Appius Claudius Crassus; Titus Genucius Augurinus
- Succeeded by: Second College of Decemvirs

Personal details
- Born: Unknown Ancient Rome
- Died: Unknown Ancient Rome

Titus Genucius Augurinus was a Roman politician in the 5th century BC, consul and decemvir in 451 BC.

== Family ==
He was a member of the gens Genucii. He was the son of Lucius and grandson of Lucius. His complete name is Titus Genucius L.f. L.n. Augurinus. He was the brother of Marcus Genucius Augurinus, consul in 445 BC. The importance of the Genucii Augurini among the patricians of the time is uncertain. His nomen is sometimes given under the form Minucius.

== Biography ==
In 451 BC, he was elected consul with Appius Claudius Crassus. They put in place the first Decemvirate with Crassus presiding. Augurinus held the offices of decemvir and consul simultaneously. The decemviri wrote up the first ten tables of the Twelve Tables.

== Bibliography ==
=== Ancient bibliography ===
- Livy, Ab urbe condita
- (in French) Diodorus Siculus, Universal History, Book XII, 9 on the site Philippe Remacle
- Dionysius of Halicarnassus, Roman Antiquities

=== Modern bibliography ===
- Broughton, T. Robert S. (1951), "The Magistrates of the Roman Republic", Philological Monographs, number XV, volume I, vol. I, 509 B.C. - 100 B.C., New York: The American Philological Association
