= Aternia gens =

Ancient Roman family

The gens Aternia, also written Aeternia, was a patrician family at ancient Rome. The only member of this gens to appear in history was Aulus Aternius Varus, consul in 454 BC, and later one of the only patricians ever to be chosen tribune of the plebs. Other Aternii are known from inscriptions.

== Branches and cognomina ==
The only surnames of the Aternii in Republican times are Varus and Fontinalis. Varus belongs to a large class of cognomina originally derived from the physical characteristics of the bearer, and indicated someone "knock-kneed"; that is, with inwardly-turned legs. Fontinalis is derived from fons, and must have indicated someone who lived near a spring; it belongs to a common class of surname derived from the names of everyday objects.

== Members ==
This list includes abbreviated praenomina. For an explanation of this practice, see filiation.

- Aulus Aternius Varus, surnamed Fontinalis, was consul in 454 BC. He and his colleague, Spurius Tarpeius Montanus Capitolinus, passed a law regulating fines. Six years later, Aternius and Tarpeius were chosen tribunes of the plebs, when only five candidates received sufficient votes for election, and Marcus Duilius, presiding over the election, instructed these five to co-opt five colleagues. Although patricians, they were favourably disposed to the interests of the plebs, and so acceptable to their colleagues.
- Aternia, a maker of small pottery, whose maker's mark has been found in Pannonia Superior, Raetia, and at Ariminum in Cisalpine Gaul.
- Aeternius, a young man buried in a third-century tomb at Ammaedara in Africa Proconsularis, aged twenty-seven years and six months.
- Aeternia C. l. Etaera, a freedwoman named in an inscription from Rome.
- Aeternia Feculina, an elderly woman buried in a third-century tomb at Ammaedara, aged ninety-two, in a tomb dedicated by Cornelius Felix.
- Publius Aternius Hilarus, named in an undated inscription from Rome.
- Gaius Aeternius Rufus, a soldier in the Praetorian Guard, and a native of Misenum in Campania, who together with Lucius Statius Valens and Marcus Musidius Petra, dedicated a second-century tomb at Misenum for their late colleague, Lucius Pomponius Varus, aged thirty-five years, nine months, who had named them his heirs. All except for Musidius belonged to the century of Gaius Tarulius Vitalis; Musidius was from the century of Clemens.
- Marcus Aternius M. f. Successus, a boy buried at Rome, aged nine, with a monument from his father, Marcus Vennius Successus.
- Aternia Zaba, a woman buried at Gillium in Africa Proconsularis, aged eighty-one.

== See also ==
- List of Roman gentes

== Bibliography ==
- Titus Livius (Livy), History of Rome.
- Dictionary of Greek and Roman Biography and Mythology, William Smith, ed., Little, Brown and Company, Boston (1849).
- Theodor Mommsen et alii, Corpus Inscriptionum Latinarum (The Body of Latin Inscriptions, abbreviated CIL), Berlin-Brandenburgische Akademie der Wissenschaften (1853–present).
- René Cagnat et alii, L'Année épigraphique (The Year in Epigraphy, abbreviated AE), Presses Universitaires de France (1888–present).
- George Davis Chase, "The Origin of Roman Praenomina", in Harvard Studies in Classical Philology, vol. VIII, pp. 103–184 (1897).
- Alfred Merlin, Inscriptions Latines de La Tunisie (Latin Inscriptions from Tunisia), Fondation Dourlans, Paris (1944).
- T. Robert S. Broughton, The Magistrates of the Roman Republic, American Philological Association (1952–1986).
