= Aulus Manlius Vulso (decemvir) =

5th-century BC Roman politician

First College of Decemvirs
- In office 451 BC – 450 BC Serving with Appius Claudius Crassus; Titus Genucius Augurinus; Servius Sulpicius Camerinus Cornutus; Titus Veturius Geminus Cicurinus; Publius Curiatius Fistus Trigeminus; Publius Sestius Capitolinus Vaticanus; Titus Romilius Rocus Vaticanus; Gaius Julius Iulus; Spurius Postumius Albus Regillensis
- Preceded by: Appius Claudius Crassus, Titus Genucius Augurinus
- Succeeded by: Second College of Decemvirs

Personal details
- Born: Unknown; Ancient Rome
- Died: Unknown; Ancient Rome
- Children: Aulus Manlius Vulso Capitolinus

Aulus Manlius Vulso was a Roman politician in the 5th century BC, and was a member of the first college of the decemviri in 451 BC. In 474 BC, he may have been elected consul with Lucius Furius Medullinus. Whether or not the decemvir is the same man as the consul of 474 BC remains unknown.

== Family ==
He was the son of a Gnaeus Manlius, perhaps Gnaeus Manlius Cincinnatus (consul in 480 BC), and grandson of a Publius Manlius. His complete name is A. Manlius Cn.f. P.n. Vulso. He had a son by the name of Aulus Manlius Vulso Capitolinus, who was consular tribune in 405, 402, and 397 BC.

== Biography ==
In 454 BC, under pressure by the tribunes of the plebs, the patricians accepted sending a delegation of three former consuls, among which was Vulso, Spurius Postumius Albus Regillensis, and Servius Sulpicius Camerinus Cornutus, to Athens and Magna Graecia so that they could study Greek law. They returned in 452 BC and their report resulted in the creation of the First Decemvirate (decemviri legibus scribendis) in 451 BC. Vulso actively worked alongside the decemviri, where he participated in the creation of the first written Roman laws. After about a year, he abdicated from his position with his colleagues, making way for the Second Decemvirate, which finished the last two tables of the Law of the Twelve Tables.

== Bibliography ==
=== Ancient bibliography ===
- Livy, Ab urbe condita
- Dionysius of Halicarnassus, Roman Antiquities
- Diodorus Siculus, Bibliotheca Historica

=== Modern bibliography ===
- Broughton, T. Robert S. (1951), The American Philological Association (ed.), "The Magistrates of the Roman Republic", Philological Monographs, number XV, volume I, vol. I, 509 B.C. – 100 B.C., New York
- Cels-Saint-Hilaire, Janine (1995), La République des tribus: Du droit de vote et de ses enjeux aux débuts de la République romaine (495–300 av. J.-C. (in French), Presses universitaires du Mirail, ISBN 2-85816-262-X
- Smith, William, ed. (1870). "Vulso [4]". Dictionary of Greek and Roman Biography and Mythology.
