= Publius Curiatius Fistus Trigeminus =

5th-century BC Roman senator, consul and decemvir

Consul of the Roman Republic
- In office 1 August 453 BC – 31 July 452 BC Serving with Sextus Quinctilius Varus, Spurius Furius Medullinus Fusus (consul 464 BC)
- Preceded by: Aulus Aternius Varus, Spurius Tarpeius Montanus Capitolinus
- Succeeded by: Publius Sestius Capitolinus Vaticanus, Titus Menenius Lanatus (consul 452 BC)

First College of Decemvirs
- In office 451 BC – 450 BC Serving with Appius Claudius Crassus, Titus Genucius Augurinus, Gaius Julius Iulus (consul 482 BC), Aulus Manlius Vulso, Servius Sulpicius Camerinus Cornutus (consul 461 BC), Publius Sestius Capitolinus Vaticanus, Titus Romilius Rocus Vaticanus and Spurius Postumius Albus Regillensis (consul 466 BC)
- Preceded by: Publius Curiatius Fistus Trigeminus, Sextus Quinctilius Varus
- Succeeded by: Second College of Decemvirs

Personal details
- Born: Unknown; Ancient Rome
- Died: 453; Ancient Rome

Publius Curiatius Fistus Trigeminus was a Roman politician in the 5th century BC, consul in 453 BC and decemvir in 451 BC.

== Family ==
He was named Publius Curiatius by Livy, but named Publius Horatius by Dionysius of Halicarnassus. Diodorus Siculus calls him only Trigeminus. He could have been part of the gens Horatii rather than the Curiatii, two gentes that had opposed each other during the Roman monarchy in the fight of the Horatii and the Curiatii.

If he was part of the gens Curiatii, he was the only member of the family to become consul.

== Biography ==
=== Consulship ===
In 453 BC, he was consul with Sextus Quinctilius Varus. Rome was ravaged in that year by a famine and an epidemic, which killed animals as well as people. It is thought to have been typhus, with the epidemic continuing on for ten or more years. His colleague, Varus, and Furius Medullinus Fusus, the consul suffect who replaced him, both died of the disease that same year.

=== Decemvirate ===
In 451 BC, he was part of the First Decemvirate which wrote the ten first tables of the Law of the Twelve Tables.

== Bibliography ==
=== Ancient bibliography ===
- Livy, Ab urbe condita
- (in French) Diodorus Siculus, Universal History, Book XII, 9 on the site Philippe Remacle
- Dionysius of Halicarnassus, Roman Antiquities, Book X, 1-16, and Book X, 45-63 at LacusCurtius

=== Modern bibliography ===
- Broughton, T. Robert S. (1951), "The Magistrates of the Roman Republic", Philological Monographs, number XV, volume I, vol. I, 509 B.C. - 100 B.C., New York: The American Philological Association

Political offices
Preceded by Spurius Tarpeius Montanus Capitolinus; Aulus Aternius Varus Fontinalis	Roman consul with Sextus Quinctilius; 453 BC	Succeeded by Titus Menenius Lanatus; Publius Sestius Capito Vaticanus
