= Sextus Quinctilius =

Roman consul

Sextus Quinctilius (died 452 BC) was a member of the Quinctilia gens who was consul of the Roman Republic from 453 till his death due to pestilence in 452 BC.

He was the son of Sextus Quinctilius.

Political offices
Preceded by Spurius Tarpeius Montanus Capitolinus; Aulus Aternius Varus Fontinalis	Roman consul with Publius Curiatius Fistus Trigeminus; 453 BC	Succeeded by Titus Menenius Lanatus; Publius Sestius Capito Vaticanus
