= Lex Trebonia (448 BC) =

Roman law from 448 BC

The Lex Trebonia was a law passed in 448 BC to forbid the tribunes of the plebs from co-opting colleagues to fill vacant positions. Its purpose was to prevent the patricians from pressuring the tribunes to appoint colleagues sympathetic to or chosen from the aristocracy.

In 451 BC, Rome's traditional consular government was replaced by a committee of ten senior statesmen, known as the decemvirs, who were tasked with drawing up the complete body of Roman law, based on existing law and tradition, as well as on Greek models reported by a group of Roman envoys who had been sent to study Greek law. Their efforts resulted in the first ten tables of Roman law, but the work was incomplete, and so a second college of decemvirs was appointed for the following year. Appius Claudius Crassus, who had been consul-elect before the decemvirate, was the only member of the first college to participate in the second, and he ensured that his colleagues for the second year were like-minded and easily dominated by himself. The final two tables of Roman law that they drew up imposed harsh restrictions on the plebeians, and forbade the intermarriage of patricians and plebeians.

The decemvirs then continued in office the following year, without calling for new elections. Public resentment of the decemvirs and many of the laws they had promulgated, combined with reports of their corruption, and in some cases tolerance of criminal acts committed by their allies, led to the overthrow of the decemvirate. The tribunes of the plebs passed laws restoring the consular government, and making permanent both the right of appeal and the continuance of their own college. The new consuls then achieved what the decemvirs had failed to accomplish, winning military victories over the Sabines and the Aequi, but the Roman Senate refused them a triumph; the tribunes of the plebs then submitted the matter to a popular vote, and won a triumph for the consuls.

Flush with their successes against the aristocracy, the tribunes stood for re-election the following year. Fearful that his colleagues were repeating the mistakes of the decemvirs, the tribune Marcus Duilius, who presided over the election, refused to put their names forward for the election, and as a result only five candidates received enough votes for the office. Duilius then directed them to co-opt five colleagues to serve alongside them, frustrating the ambition of the other tribunes of BC 449. According to Livy, the five elected allowed themselves to be guided by the patricians, to the extent that they chose two patricians to serve as tribunes of the plebs: Aulus Aternius Varus and Spurius Tarpeius Montanus Capitolinus, who had been consuls in 454.

One of the plebeian members of the college, Lucius Trebonius, then proposed a law forbidding the co-optation of tribunes, but calling for their election to continue until the full number had been elected. The law was passed, and so effective was Trebonius at frustrating the patricians' designs during his year of office that he earned the surname Asper, meaning "prickly".

The Trebonian law was not always strictly enforced. When not enough tribunes were elected in 401 BC, the patricians attempted to have some of their number co-opted to the office. In this they failed, but two plebeians were still chosen as tribunes by co-optation, to the great annoyance of their colleague, Gnaeus Trebonius, whose name was attached to the flouted law.

== See also ==
- Roman law
- List of Roman laws

== Sources ==
- Titus Livius (Livy), Ab Urbe Condita (History of Rome).
- T. Robert S. Broughton, The Magistrates of the Roman Republic, American Philological Association (1952).
