= Romilia gens =

The gens Romilia or Romulia was a minor patrician family at ancient Rome. Members of this gens are mentioned in the time of the Roman monarchy, and again in the first century of the Republic. Titus Romilius Rocus Vaticanus was consul in 455 BC, and subsequently a member of the first Decemvirate in 451. From this time, the Romilii fell into obscurity for centuries, only to appear briefly in imperial times. A number of Romilii are known from inscriptions.

== Origin ==
The Romilii claimed descent from Romulus, the legendary founder and first King of Rome. Scholars have long disputed the historicity of Romulus, but from the morphology of the nomen Romilius, it seems probable that Romulus was an authentic cognomen; Romilius belongs to a large class of gentilicia formed using the suffix -ilius, which were typically derived from surnames ending in the diminutive suffix -ulus. The first of this family mentioned in history was Romulius Denter, said to have been appointed praefectus urbi by Romulus himself.

That the Romilii were patricians is inferred from the fact that Vaticanus was consul in 455, while the plebeians were excluded from the consulship until the lex Licinia Sextia of 367 BC; and from his election to the first college of decemvirs, all of whom are supposed to have been patricians. However, historians have long suspected that some of the consuls in the years preceding the Decemvirate were in fact plebeians, and that the consulship was not formally closed to the plebeians until after the decemvirs had been overthrown. A similar objection has been made with respect to the decemvirs; while plebeians are not supposed to have been included in the first college, it has been argued that some of the decemvirs bore plebeian names.

Since the Romilii vanish from history for several centuries after the time of the decemvirs, it may not be possible to prove whether the Romilii were patrician or plebeian. The Romilii mentioned in imperial times may well have been plebeians; but most patrician gentes eventually acquired plebeian branches, often descended from freedmen or newly enfranchised citizens, who assumed the nomina of their patrons.

== Praenomina ==
The only praenomina associated with the Romilii known from history or inscriptions are Titus, Lucius, and Gaius, all of which were common throughout Roman history.

== Branches and cognomina ==
Denter, the cognomen assigned to the first praefectus urbi, referred to someone with prominent teeth, while Rocus, from raucus, designated someone with a loud, deep, or hoarse voice. Vaticanus belongs to a class of surnames derived from a person's place of origin or residence, in this case the Mons Vaticanus, a hill at Rome. Pollio, the surname of a Romilius who lived in the time of Augustus, was derived from the occupation of the bearer, a polisher of arms or armour.

== Members ==
This list includes abbreviated praenomina. For an explanation of this practice, see filiation.

- Romulius Denter, (Note: Tacitus calls him Denter Romulius.) said by Tacitus to have been appointed the first praefectus urbi, in the time of Romulus.
- Titus Romilius T. f. T. n. Rocus Vaticanus, consul in 455 BC, together with his colleague, Gaius Veturius Geminus Cicurinus, defeated the Aequi at Mount Algidus; but they were subsequently prosecuted and fined for depositing all of the booty in the public treasury, reserving none for their soldiers. In 451, he was a member of the first college of decemvirs, and helped to draw up the first ten tables of Roman law.
- Romilius Pollio, an elderly man who had reached the age of one hundred, and was asked the secret of his longevity by Augustus. Romilius replied that he drank honeyed wine, and applied oil to his skin.
- Romilius Marcellus, a centurion serving in the twenty-second legion in Germania in AD 69, was put to death as one of the supporters of Galba.
- Lucius Romilius O[...]poh[...], a soldier stationed at Rome in AD 70, serving in the century of Tiberius Julius Primigenius.
- Romulius Euhemerus, named in an early third century inscription from Rome.
- Lucius Romilius, head of a college of scribae at Rome.
- Romilia C. l., a freedwoman buried in a family sepulchre at Rome.
- Gaius Romilius C. l. Anteros, a freedman buried in a family sepulchre at Rome.
- Romulius Germanus, son of Germanus and Colenda, buried at Rome.
- Gaius Romilius C. f. Juncus, buried by his parents in a family sepulchre at Rome, aged thirteen.
- Romulius Justus, buried at Rome, aged forty-five, with a monument from his wife.
- Gaius Romilius C. l. Phileros, a freedman named in a funerary inscription from Rome.

== See also ==
- List of Roman gentes

== Bibliography ==
- Dionysius of Halicarnassus, Romaike Archaiologia.
- Titus Livius (Livy), History of Rome.
- Gaius Plinius Secundus (Pliny the Elder), Historia Naturalis (Natural History).
- Publius Cornelius Tacitus, Annales, Historiae.
- Dictionary of Greek and Roman Biography and Mythology, William Smith, ed., Little, Brown and Company, Boston (1849).
- Theodor Mommsen et alii, Corpus Inscriptionum Latinarum (The Body of Latin Inscriptions, abbreviated CIL), Berlin-Brandenburgische Akademie der Wissenschaften (1853–present).
- Giovanni Battista de Rossi, Inscriptiones Christianae Urbis Romanae Septimo Saeculo Antiquiores (Christian Inscriptions from Rome of the First Seven Centuries, abbreviated ICUR), Vatican Library, Rome (1857–1861, 1888).
- René Cagnat et alii, L'Année épigraphique (The Year in Epigraphy, abbreviated AE), Presses Universitaires de France (1888–present).
- George Davis Chase, "The Origin of Roman Praenomina", in Harvard Studies in Classical Philology, vol. VIII, pp. 103–184 (1897).
- T. Robert S. Broughton, The Magistrates of the Roman Republic, American Philological Association (1952).
- Centocelle II: Roma S.D.O. Le indagini archeologiche, Rita Volpe, editor, Rome (2007).
