= Lex Aternia Tarpeia =

Roman law on fines and penalties

The lex Aternia Tarpeia was a Roman law, introduced by the consuls Aulus Aternius Varus and Spurius Tarpeius Montanus Capitolinus in 454 BC, and passed during their year of office. The law concerned the regulation of payments for fines and penalties.

== Background ==
The law was promulgated against a background of tensions between the plebeian and patrician orders. The year after their successful campaign against the Aequi, the consuls Titus Romilius Rocus Vaticanus and Gaius Veturius Cicurinus were prosecuted by Gaius Calvius Cicero, one of the tribunes of the plebs, on the grounds that the soldiers had been deprived of their spoils. Romilius was fined 10,000 asses, (Note: Originally these would have represented actual pounds of bronze, or aes rude, as these events predate the use of Roman coinage by a century.) and Veturius 15,000. The lex Aternia Tarpeia was introduced in order to regulate such fines.

== Provisions ==
The law drew upon Athenian precedent, as Solon's laws allowed fines levied in livestock to be transmuted into coinage. After the prosecution of Romilius and Veterius, Roman emissaries were sent to study Greek law; according to tradition, they went to Athens, but they may instead have drawn on the laws of Magna Graecia, a region of Greek colonies in southern Italy. The best known result of this commission was the establishment of the Decemvirs, who held power from 451 to 449, and established the Twelve Tables of Roman law.

The lex Aternia Tarpeia seems to have been an earlier result of the commission's findings. It is not mentioned by Livy or Dionysius, but was described by Cicero, Aulus Gellius, and is alluded to by Pliny. Before the new law, fines had generally been levied in livestock; for minor offences, fines ranged from two sheep up to thirty oxen. Dionysius mentions a maximum fine of two oxen and thirty sheep, although Gellius gives the reverse. The value of fines was naturally dependent on the quality of the livestock, which could be highly inconsistent. The lex Aternia Tarpeia is said to have addressed this defect by establishing an equivalence scale: ten asses for a sheep, and one hundred for an ox. Some scholars suggest that the law did no more than regulate the maximum fine, or suprema multa, and that the change from fines of property to fines in bronze was the result of the lex Julia Papiria, a law passed in 430 BC.

== See also ==
- Conflict of the Orders
- List of Roman laws
- Roman Law

== Bibliography ==
- Marcus Tullius Cicero, De Republica.
- Dionysius of Halicarnassus, Romaike Archaiologia (Roman Antiquities).
- Titus Livius (Livy), History of Rome.
- Gaius Plinius Secundus (Pliny the Elder), Historia Naturalis (Natural History).
- Aulus Gellius, Noctes Atticae (Attic Nights).
- Barthold Georg Niebuhr, The History of Rome, Julius Charles Hare and Connop Thirlwall, trans., John Smith, Cambridge (1828).
- Dictionary of Greek and Roman Antiquities, William Smith, ed., Little, Brown, and Company, Boston (1859).
- F.W. Walbank, A.E. Astin, M.W. Frederiksen, and R.M. Ogilvie, The Cambridge Ancient History, Cambridge University Press (1990).
