= Gaius Veturius Cicurinus =

5th-century BC Roman politician and soldier

Consul of the Roman Republic
- In office 1 August 455 BC – 31 July 454 Serving with Titus Romilius Rocus Vaticanus
- Preceded by: Marcus Valerius Maximus Lactuca, Spurius Verginius Tricostus Caeliomontanus
- Succeeded by: Spurius Tarpeius Montanus Capitolinus, Aulus Aternius Varus

Gaius Veturius Cicurinus was a Roman consul in 455 BC with Titus Romilius Rocus Vaticanus. His term saw continued divisions between the plebeians and the patricians. His father was named Publius Veturius Cicurinus, possibly identifying him with the consul of 499 BC.

== Biography ==
=== Consulship ===
In 455 BC, he was elected consul with Titus Romilius Rocus Vaticanus. They issued orders during a period of high tension between the patricians and the plebeians. The tribunes of the plebs, representatives of the people, demanded in vain for many years that the power of the consuls be limited in written law. The Lex Terentilia, first drafted in 462 BC, was deferred each year by the consuls but each subsequent year the tribunes put forward identical drafts of the law.

=== Proceedings ===
Titus Romilius and Veturius Cicurinus had defeated the Aequi at Mount Algidus. But in early 454 BC they were taken to court by the plebeian aedile Lucius Alienus and by the tribune of the plebs, Gaius Calvus Cicero, for having sold the captured material and equipment in order to replenish the treasury, without having received the approval of the troops, who would otherwise have been entitled to a share of the proceeds. The testimony of Lucius Siccius Dentatus implicated Titus Romilius, but Siccius retracted his testimony when Romilius offered to send an ambassador to the Greek cities to look at their forms of governance as a means of easing political tensions. Nevertheless, Romilius and Veturius were found guilty and ordered to pay a considerable indemnity of 10,000 asses. This proved impracticable. This situation appears to have led to the passage of the lex Aternia Tarpeia, regulating the payment of fines, and fixing the maximum fine which magistrates could impose.

=== Augur ===
In 453 BC Veturius was elected as augur to replace Gaius Horatius Pulvillus who had died in a major pestilence that was ravaging Rome.
