= Titus Romilius Rocus Vaticanus =

Roman politician, consul in 455 BC, decemvir in 451 BC

Consul of the Roman Republic
- In office 1 August 455 BC – 31 July 454 Serving with Gaius Veturius Cicurinus
- Preceded by: Marcus Valerius Maximus Lactuca, Spurius Verginius Tricostus Caeliomontanus
- Succeeded by: Spurius Tarpeius Montanus Capitolinus, Aulus Aternius Varus

First College of Decemvirs
- In office 451 BC – 450 BC Serving with Appius Claudius Crassus; Titus Genucius Augurinus; Servius Sulpicius Camerinus Cornutus (consul 461 BC); Publius Curiatius Fistus Trigeminus; Publius Sestius Capitolinus Vaticanus; Titus Veturius Geminus Cicurinus (consul 462 BC); Gaius Julius Iulus; Spurius Postumius Albus Regillensis
- Preceded by: Appius Claudius Crassus, Titus Genucius Augurinus
- Succeeded by: Second College of Decemvirs

Personal details
- Born: Unknown; Ancient Rome
- Died: Unknown; Ancient Rome

Titus Romilius Rocus Vaticanus was a Roman politician in the 5th century BC, consul in 455 BC, and decemvir in 451 BC.

== Family ==
He was the only member of the patrician family to become consul. The gens Romilia disappears after him in the ancient accounts. He was the grandson of a Titus Romilius and the son of a Titus Romilius, his complete name being Titus Romilius T.f. T.n. Rocus Vaticanus. The cognomen Vaticanus which he carried shows that the term was used at least as far back as the 5th century BC. He might be the founder of the tribus Romilia which included several immigrant districts.

== Biography ==
=== Consulship ===
In 455 BC, he was elected consul with Gaius Veturius Cicurinus. They issued orders during a period of high tension between the patricians and the plebeians. The tribunes of the plebs, representatives of the people, demanded in vain for many years that the power of the consuls be limited in written law. The Lex Terentilia, first drafted in 462 BC, was deferred each year by the tribunes who tirelessly proposed numerous identical drafts of the law.

The Latin city of Tusculum needed Roman aid against the Aequi who had pillaged their lands. The two consuls levied an army, consisted primarily of patricians, but also of some plebeian volunteers, to defend the Tusculan allies. Among the plebeians was Lucius Siccius Dentatus, who openly supported the legal drafts contested by the patricians. In response, Titus Romilius chose Lucius Siccius for a perilous mission. When Siccius protested regarding the risks of the mission, the consul interrupted and imposed silence. This anecdote, delivered by Dionysius of Halicarnassus but ignored by Livy, allowed Dionysius to illustrate by example the tense relationship between the patricians and the plebeians, the superiority in social status, and the authority of the former over the later. Lucius Siccius Dentatus survived and was elected tribune of the plebs in 454 BC. The Aequi were defeated near Mount Algidus. The public treasury was then exhausted, and so the consuls decided to sell the abundant spoils (praeda), which would otherwise be rewarded to the soldiery. Essentially, this limited the gains of the plebeians who had volunteered.

=== Proceedings ===
In the wake of their decision, Gaius Veturius and Titus Romilius were taken to court by the plebeian aedile Lucius Alienus and by the tribune of the plebs, Gaius Calvus Cicero, in early 454 BC. The testimony of Lucius Siccius Dentatus implicated Titus Romilius, but Siccius retracted his testimony when the old consul offered to send an ambassador to the Greek cities as a sign of appeasement during political tensions. Nevertheless, Titus Romilius was found guilty and ordered to pay a considerable indemnity of 10,000 asses. This proved impracticable, and so a law was passed allowing the indemnity to be satisfied by an equivalent value in cattle and bronze.

=== Decemvirate ===
In 451 BC, Titus Romilius was part of the First Decemvirate which wrote the first written laws of Rome and whose government lasted one year and acted in moderation.

== Bibliography ==
=== Ancient bibliography ===
- Livy, Ab urbe condita
- (in French) Diodorus Siculus, Universal History, Book XII, 9 on the site Philippe Remacle
- Dionysius of Halicarnassus, Roman Antiquities, Book X, 33-49/50-60 at LacusCurtius

=== Modern bibliography ===
- Broughton, T. Robert S. (1951), "The Magistrates of the Roman Republic", Philological Monographs, number XV, volume I, vol. I, 509 B.C. - 100 B.C., New York: The American Philological Association
- Briquel, Dominique (2000), "La nuit du V^{e} siècle", Roman History. Tome I, Des origines à Auguste (in French), pp. 163–202, ISBN 978-2-213-03194-1
- Cels-Saint-Hilaire, Janine (1995), La République des tribus: Du droit de vote et de ses enjeux aux débuts de la République romaine (495-300 av. J.-C. (in French), Presses universitaires du Mirail, ISBN 2-85816-262-X
- Liverani, Paolo (1999), Topografia antica del Vaticano (in Italian), Monumenti, Musei e Gallerie Pontificie
- Lynewood Smith, Daniel (2012), The Rhetoric of Interruption: Speech-Making, Turn-Taking, and Rule-Breaking in Luke-Acts and Ancient Greek Narrative, Walter de Gruyter
- Alföldi, Andreas (1965), Early Rome and the Latins, University of Michigan Press
- Gagé, Jean (1978), "La Lex Aternia: L'estimation des amendes (multae) et le fonctionnement de la commission décemvirale de 451-449 av. J.-C.", L'antiquité classique (in French), vol. 47, no. 1, pp. 70–95, doi:10.3406/antiq.1978.1883

Political offices
Preceded by Marcus Valerius Maximus Lactuca, and Spurius Verginius Tricostus Caeliomontanus	Consul of the Roman Republic; 455 BC with Gaius Veturius Cicurinus	Succeeded by Spurius Tarpeius Montanus Capitolinus, and Aulus Aternius Varus
