= Lucius Icilius =

5th-century BC Roman tribune of the Plebs

Lucius Icilius was a Tribune of the Plebs in 456, 455 and 449 BC. In 456, he passed the lex de Aventino publicando, which gave the Aventine Hill to the plebs. A few years later, around 451 BC, he was betrothed to one Verginia, daughter of Lucius Verginius. The decemvir Appius Claudius Crassus lusted after her and tried to use his power to take her as his own, possibly as a slave. This provoked the second secessio plebis in 449, where Icilius acted as spokesman for the plebs.
