= Appius Claudius Crassus Inregillensis Sabinus =

Roman senator, consul in 471 BC and 451 BC

- Years active: fl. 471–451 BC
- Office: Consul (471, 451 BC); Decemvir (451 BC)
- Children: 2

Appius Claudius Crassus Inregillensis (or Crassinus Regillensis) Sabinus (fl. c. 471–451 BC) was a Roman senator during the early Republic, most notable as the leading member of the ten-man board (the Decemvirate) which drew up the Twelve Tables of Roman law around 451 BC. He is also probably identical with the Appius Claudius who was consul in 471 BC.

As consul in 471, Claudius is portrayed in Roman historical tradition as a violent opponent of the plebeians in matters of voting rights and military discipline. Later, as decemvir, Claudius is said to have behaved as a lustful tyrant, with his attempt to force himself on the maid Verginia resulting in the second secession of the plebs, the downfall of the Decemvirate, and Claudius's own death. These accounts are unreliable and probably ahistorical, fabricated in later times to portray the patrician clan of the Claudii as proud and arrogant aristocrats.

== Name and identity ==
Claudius is supposed to have been the son of Appius Claudius Sabinus Inregillensis, the founder of the Claudia gens, who is said to have migrated to Rome with his followers in 504 BC and held the consulship in 495. Livy and Dionysius of Halicarnassus distinguish a Claudius who was consul in 471 BC with the decemvir in 451 BC, but the Fasti Capitolini identify the two. Modern historians accept the identification due to some inconsistencies and unlikely coincidences in Livy's narrative. Claudius had at least two sons: the elder was Appius Claudius Crassus, consular tribune in 424; the younger was named Publius.

The Fasti give his full name as Appius Claudius Crassus Inregillensis Sabinus. Theodor Mommsen found the spelling Inregillensis over Regillensis ('from Regillum') peculiar, and suggested that the abbreviated form of Claudius's name on the stone, 'crassinregill', should be read instead as 'Crassinus Regillensis', though most sources have not followed him. Crassus, which must have been a personal cognomen, means "thick" or "stout", and could apply equally to a large man or a dullard.

== Traditional accounts ==
=== Consul in 471 BC ===
According to Dionysius of Halicarnassus, Appius was a candidate for the consulship of 482 BC, but his election was blocked by the tribunes of the plebs. Eleven years later, the patricians succeeded in electing him consul, with the goal of preventing the law proposed by the tribune Volero Publilius, transferring the election of the tribunes of the plebs from the comitia curiata to the comitia tributa. (Note: It is not entirely certain that the election had taken place in the comitia curiata, although this is stated by Cicero and implied from passages in Dionysius and Livy. Niebuhr argues that they were elected by the comitia centuriata, and that the comitia curiata merely confirmed their appointment.) Appius' colleague was Titus Quinctius, who assumed the role of mediator.

On the day appointed for the election, the consuls, a number of senators of consular rank, and other members of the Roman aristocracy attempted to block the passage of the law. Gaius Laetorius, one of the tribunes, who had unwisely harangued Appius and his family the previous day, and vowed with his life to see the law carried through, ordered the patricians to depart so that the plebeians could vote on the matter. When Appius refused to budge and argued that Laetorius had used the wrong legal formula to dismiss his opponents, Laetorius demanded his removal by force. Appius in turn sent a lictor to arrest the tribune, but the crowd protected him and turned on Appius, who was hurried out of the Forum at his colleague's urging.

The next day, Quinctius, who had helped settle the crowd and managed to have the matter postponed until passions had calmed, urged the Senate to defer to the people, as the stand off between the patricians and plebeians over this issue was threatening the state itself. Appius argued that this course of action amounted to cowardice, and that the Senate was submitting itself to oppression by the plebeians. But Quinctius' argument carried the day and the Senate agreed to allow the passage of the lex Publilia.

Later in the year, Appius was given command of a Roman army to fight the Volsci. Stung by his defeat at the hands of the tribunes, the consul was determined to subject his army to the harshest discipline. But his disrespect for the plebeians was so notorious that his soldiers were openly insubordinate and disobedient. They refused to attack the enemy, instead retreating to their camp, and only turning against the Volscian forces when they were attacked themselves. His officers dissuaded Appius from taking immediate action against the soldiers, but the army was attacked again and fell into disarray as it left the camp.

After reaching the safety of Roman territory, Appius gathered the remnants of his army, and ordered that all of the soldiers who had lost their equipment or standards, and all of the officers who had deserted their posts should be flogged and beheaded. He then punished the remainder of the army with decimation, the earliest instance of this particular punishment occurring in Roman history.

In 470 BC, Appius opposed the agrarian law originally proposed by Spurius Cassius, and was summoned to answer for his conduct by the plebeian tribunes, Marcus Duilius and Gnaeus Siccius. At his trial, Appius had the full support of the Senate, which viewed him as the champion of the aristocratic order. He replied to the charges with such pride, vigour and contempt that "one might have thought that he was prosecuting his accusers rather than defending himself against them." Uncertain how to proceed, the tribunes adjourned the trial. However, Appius fell ill and died before it could be resumed. (Note: According to Dionysius, Appius took his own life, but his family stated that he had died a natural death.) A eulogy was given, which the tribunes attempted to prevent. But here popular opinion was against them, so great was Appius' majesty that thousands attended his funeral and listened to the words spoken in praise of their enemy.

Friedrich Münzer rejects this entire account of Claudius's consulship in 471 BC, and asserts that Claudius was elected to the consulship again 20 years later.

=== First decemvirate ===
Claudius was elected consul for the year 451, together with Titus Genucius Augurinus. Three years earlier, envoys had been sent to Greece to study Greek law. The envoys, Spurius Postumius Albus, Aulus Manlius Vulso, and Servius Sulpicius Camerinus, returned in 452 and reported their findings. Shortly after Claudius and his colleague took office, it was decided to appoint a committee of ten men (decemviri), all of consular rank, (Note: Men who had served as consul.) who would draw up the tables of Roman law, based on both existing traditions and Greek precedents.

The decemvirs were given the same authority as the consuls for their year of office, but as the consuls elected for 451, Claudius and Genucius were appointed decemvirs after resigning the consulship. Their colleagues included the three envoys, as well as Spurius Veturius Crassus Cicurinus, Gaius Julius Iulus, Publius Sestius Capitolinus, Publius Curiatius Fistus Trigeminus, and Titus Romilius Rocus Vaticanus. The decemvirs were seen to cooperate for the good of the state, and drew up the first ten tables of Roman law, winning the general approval of the people. As their task remained unfinished at the end of their year, it was decided to appoint a second college of decemvirs for the following year.

Despite the reputation of his family for cruelty and hostility to the plebeians, Claudius gave the appearance of a fair and noble-minded man, earning the people's trust. His colleagues, however, grew suspicious that he would seek to be reappointed for the following year. They therefore tasked him with choosing the decemvirs for 450, and set an example by resigning their office, expecting Claudius to do the same. To their chagrin, he appointed himself, together with nine entirely new colleagues, five of them plebeians, whom he believed to be like-minded to himself, or easily dominated. The new patrician decemvirs were Marcus Cornelius Maluginensis, Marcus Sergius Esquilinus, (Note: Or perhaps Lucius; different sources disagree on his praenomen.) Lucius Minucius Esquilinus Augurinus, and Quintus Fabius Vibulanus; only Minucius and Fabius had held the consulship. The plebeian members were Quintus Poetilius Libo Visolus, Titus Antonius Merenda, Caeso Duilius Longus, Spurius Oppius Cornicen, and Manius Rabuleius. (Note: At one time it was generally believed that all of the decemvirs were patricians. Dionysius says that Poetilius, Duilius, and Oppius were plebeians, implying that Antonius and Rabuleius were patricians; but Broughton notes that all of the other Antonii and Rabuleii known are plebeians (Quintus Antonius Merenda, the son of Titus, was consular tribune in 422, and implied to have been a patrician, but that office was open to plebeians), and proposes that the second decemvirate was composed equally of patricians and plebeians. A Vestal named Oppia was put to death in 483 BC, from which it might be inferred that some of the Oppii were patricians, but her name is very uncertain, and all of the other Oppii known to history seem to have been plebeians.)

=== Second decemvirate ===
An ominous sign that the second decemvirate was not as noble-minded as the first came when the insignia of office were changed. In 451, the ten decemvirs had shared a consul's escort of twelve lictors, each receiving the honour in rotation. But the following year, each of the decemvirs was accorded an escort of twelve lictors; and unlike a consul's, these lictors kept the axes attached to their fasces, symbolizing the decemvirs' power over life and death, even within the pomerium, the sacred boundary of Rome. Since the beginning of the Republic, all lictors had removed the axes upon entering the city, in deference to the sovereignty of the people; only the lictors of a dictator retained the axes within the city. Now the city was crowded with lictors.

The decemvirs did not hesitate to make an example of those who criticized them, subjecting their opponents to beatings and summary execution, and confiscating the property of anyone who offended their dignity. Unlike the first decemvirs, the second college permitted no appeal from their judgment, ignoring the people's right of provocatio. Young men from aristocratic families joined the decemvirs' retinue, and it came to be whispered that the decemvirs had already agreed among themselves not to hold elections for the following year, but to remain in office indefinitely.

The time for elections came and passed, and the decemvirs remained in power. They published two more tables of Roman law, bringing the total to twelve; among the most onerous were those restricting the rights of the plebeians, and in particular one forbidding the intermarriage of patricians and plebeians. (Note: The twelve tables may also have codified the law preventing plebeians from holding the consulship; several consuls elected before 451 have names that were later regarded as plebeian (although it is possible that they belonged to families that were originally patrician, but later known only through plebeian branches), but all of the consuls from 449 to 367, when the lex Licinia Sextia opened the consulship to the plebeians, were certainly patricians.) When news arrived of incursions by the Sabines and Aequi, the decemvirs attempted to convene the Senate, which assembled only with difficulty, as many of the senators had left the city rather than suffer the decemvirs, or refused to obey their summons, on the grounds that the decemvirs now held no legal office.

When the Senate had gathered, two of the senators openly and vocally opposed the decemvirs. Lucius Valerius Potitus and Marcus Horatius Barbatus argued that the decemvirs' term of office had expired, and that they held no legal authority; the decemvirs were worse than kings; for now the Roman people suffered under ten Tarquins. Claudius' uncle, Gaius, spoke on his behalf, urging that no action be taken against the decemvirs for the time being. Appius ordered one of the lictors to arrest Valerius, but he appealed to the people, and escaped punishment when Lucius Cornelius Maluginensis, the brother of one of the triumvirs, seized hold of Appius, ostensibly to protect him from the crowd, but in fact to distract him.

=== End of the decemvirs ===
The Senate appointed a military command to the decemvirs, but they were defeated on both fronts, and their armies quickly retreated behind sturdy defenses. Meanwhile, two crimes occurred which proved to be the decemvirs' undoing. First, a soldier named Lucius Siccius Dentatus, who had proposed the election of new tribunes, and that the soldiers should refuse to serve until the decemvirs were replaced, was murdered on the orders of the decemvirs' commanders, who attempted to cover up the deed by claiming that he had been ambushed and killed by the enemy, despite putting up a brave fight. The truth was discovered when his body was found surrounded only by Romans, with no enemy corpses.

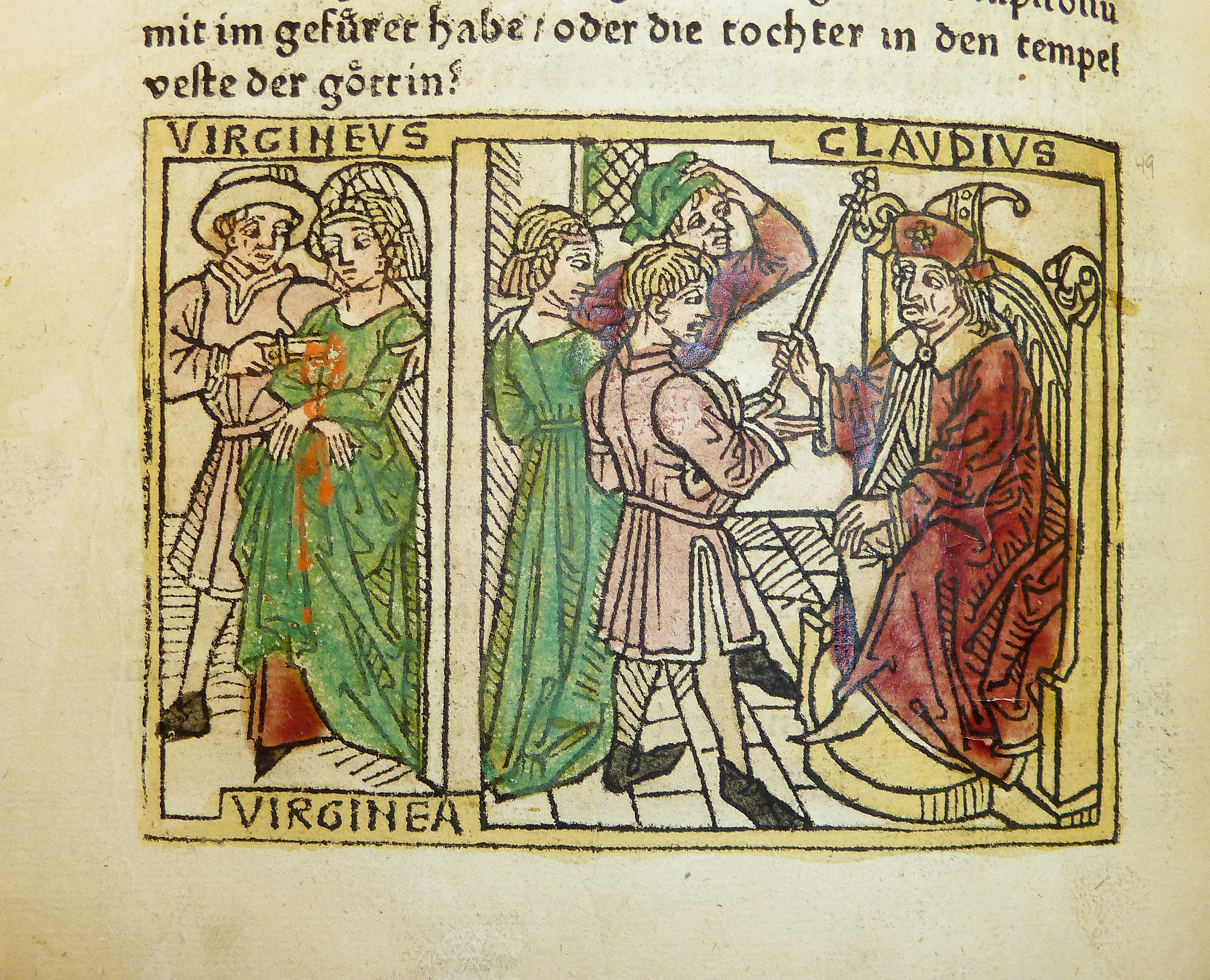
Woodcut depicting the trial of Verginia before Claudius.\

The second, and more famous misdeed concerned a young woman named Verginia, the daughter of a centurion, Lucius Verginius. She was betrothed to Lucius Icilius, tribune of the plebs in 456. Desiring her for himself, Appius sent his servant, Marcus Claudius, to kidnap Verginia, on the pretext that she was Appius' slave. When her plight became known, Appius consented to release her pending a trial of his claim, but maintained steadfastly, and over the objections of Verginia's father and Icilius, that she was his slave. Rather than have his daughter dishonoured by the decemvir, her father seized a knife from a butcher in the marketplace, and stabbed Verginia to death.

Claudius ordered the arrest of Icilius, but the lictor was blocked by Valerius and Horatius; before they could be arrested, the crowd came to their aid, and Claudius fled for his life. The Senate gave the military command to Valerius and Horatius, who were duly elected consuls after the decemvirs were forced to resign. Once the threat from the Sabines and Aequi was dealt with, the decemvirs were brought to trial. Gaius Claudius again pleaded on behalf of his nephew, but Verginius demanded that Appius face justice; according to Dionysius, Appius was said to have hanged himself in prison before he could be tried, but the popular suspicion was that he was put to death at the orders of the plebeian tribunes. Livy reports that Appius killed himself before his trial. The other decemvirs went into exile, except for Spurius Oppius, who was tried, condemned, and put to death on the same day, for the crime of cruelly beating an old soldier. (Note: According to Livy, Oppius took his own life before his trial.)

=== Historicity ===
The entire account in Livy and Dionysius of Claudius's consulship in 471 BC is rejected by Friedrich Münzer. Some scholars believe these portrayals are part of a later tradition that painted the Claudii as arrogant aristocrats and enemies of the plebs. Some, like Theodor Mommsen and T. P. Wiseman argued that the tale of Verginia and other myths about the Claudii were fabricated in the late Republic by the historian Valerius Antias.

== Cultural depictions ==
- The Physician's Tale by Geoffrey Chaucer
- Appius and Virginia by John Webster
- Virginia in Lays of Ancient Rome by Thomas Babington Macaulay

== See also ==
- Claudia gens
- Terentilius

== Bibliography ==
=== Primary sources ===
- Livy, Ab Urbe Condita (History of Rome).
- Suetonius, De Vita Caesarum (Lives of the Caesars, or The Twelve Caesars).
- Dionysius of Halicarnassus, Romaike Archaiologia.

=== Secondary sources ===
- Barthold Georg Niebuhr, The History of Rome, Julius Charles Hare and Connop Thirlwall, trans., John Smith, Cambridge (1828).
- "Appius Claudius Crassus (or Crassinus) Regillensis Sabinus" (no. 4) in the Dictionary of Greek and Roman Biography and Mythology, William Smith, ed., Little, Brown and Company, Boston (1849).
- T. Robert S. Broughton, The Magistrates of the Roman Republic, American Philological Association (1952).
- John C. Traupman, The New College Latin & English Dictionary, Bantam Books, New York (1995).
- Münzer, Friedrich, "Claudius 123", Realencyclopädie der classischen Altertumswissenschaft (RE, PW), volume 3, part 2, columns 2698–2702 (Stuttgart, 1899).
- Ogilvie, R.M. (1965). A Commentary on Livy, Books 1–5. Oxford: Clarendon Press.
- Vasaly, Ann (1987). "Personality and Power: Livy's Depiction of the Appii Claudii in the First Pentad". Transactions of the American Philological Association. 117: 203–226. doi:10.2307/283967. JSTOR 283967.
- Warrior, Valerie M. (2006). The History of Rome, Books 1–5. Indianapolis: Hackett Publishing Company. ISBN 978-0-87220-724-0.
- Wiseman, T.P. (1979). Clio's Cosmetics: Three Studies in Greco-Roman Literature. Leicester University Press. ISBN 0-8476-6206-3.

Political offices
Preceded by Lucius Pinarius Mamercinus Rufus; Publius Furius Medullinus Fusus	Roman consul 471 BC; With: Titus Quinctius Capitolinus Barbatus	Succeeded by Lucius Valerius Potitus; Tiberius Aemilius Mamercus
