= Aulus Aternius Varus Fontinalis =

5th-century BC Roman senator and consul

- Office: Consul (454 BC)

Aulus Aternius Varus Fontinalis (fl. c. 454–449 BC, sometimes called Aterius) was consul in 454 BC, with Spurius Tarpeius Montanus Capitolinus.

The consuls of the previous year, Titus Romilius and Gaius Veturius Cicurinus had defeated the Aequi at Mount Algidus, but were now prosecuted for having sold the captured material and equipment in order to replenish the treasury, without having received the approval of the troops, who would otherwise have been entitled to a share of the proceeds. The former consuls were tried and fined for their misappropriation. This occurrence appears to have led to the passage of the lex Aternia Tarpeia, regulating the payment of fines, and fixing the maximum fine which magistrates could impose.

Aternius and Tarpeius also maintained the opposition of the Senate and the patricians to a law passed two years earlier by the tribunes of the plebs, opening the Aventine Hill to settlement. With the two orders deadlocked, an agreement was forged to appoint a body consisting of both patricians and plebeians, which should pass measures for the benefit of all. Three envoys (all patricians) were sent to Athens, to study the laws of Solon and Greek political institutions, and report their findings upon their return. This settlement led to the creation of the Decemviri Legibus Scribundis, who held power from 451 to 449, and established the Twelve Tables of Roman law.

The Decemvirate failed to bring about the reconciliation of the orders, and was itself abolished, as the consulship was re-instituted in 449. A plan was then proposed by which the senate would accede to the illegal re-election of several of the tribunes, if the consuls should also be re-elected. The object of this scheme was to discredit both the tribunes and the consuls, who had previously earned the people's trust. However, the president of the elections, Marcus Duilius, himself a former tribune, secured the pledge of the consuls not to accept a second year in office.

Duilius then called for the election of the tribunes, and refused to acknowledge the re-election of the tribunes of 449. As only five other men were elected, Duilius announced that the legally-elected tribunes should appoint five others to fill the vacancies, thereby frustrating the tribunes whom the senate had sought to return to office for a second year. As a concession to those patricians who had supported the peaceful resolution of the conflict, the tribunes chose two patricians, Aternius, and his colleague Tarpeius, to fill two of the vacant positions.

This was the only time that patricians were permitted to hold this office, in consequence of which the plebeian tribune Lucius Trebonius Asper succeeded in passing the lex Trebonia, requiring that in the future, votes should continue to be called until the full number of tribunes had been elected, thereby preventing future tribunes from appointing colleagues who might be opposed to the interests of the people.

Political offices
Preceded by Titus Romilius Rocus Vaticanus; Gaius Veturius Cicurinus	Roman consul 454 BC with Spurius Tarpeius Montanus Capitolinus	Succeeded by Sextus Quinctilius; Publius Curiatius Fistus Trigeminus
