= Publius Sestius Capitolinus Vaticanus =

5th-century BC Roman senator, consul and decemvir

- Office: Consul (452 BC); Decemvir (451 BC)

Publius Sestius Capitolinus Vaticanus (fl. c. 452–451 BC) was a Roman politician in the 5th century BC, consul in 452 BC and decemvir in 451 BC.

== Family ==
He was a member of the Gens Sestii. He was the son of Quintus and his complete name is Publius Sestius Q.f. Vibi.n. Capitolinus Vaticanus. Livy gives the form Sextius then Sestius. Dionysius of Halicarnassus uses the form Siccius. His cognomen Capitolinus is not certain—we also see Capito being used. He was the only member of his family to attain the rank of consul.

== Biography ==
=== Consulship ===
In 452 BC, he was consul with Titus Menenius Lanatus. During their consulship, the delegates left to study Greek law in Athens. After returning to Rome, the tribunes of the plebs called together officials to create a commission to write the law down. Publius Sestius supported this proposition, contrary to his colleague Titus Menenius, who pondered the question before falling ill—then was rendered inactive until the end of his term as consul. Publius Sestius refused to take sole initiative in creating the commission, and so deferred the decision to the following year.

=== Decemvirate ===
In 451 BC, because of his vocal support, he was taken into the first commission of the decemvirs which drew up the first ten tables of the Law of the Twelve Tables.

== Bibliography ==
=== Ancient bibliography ===
- Livy, Ab urbe condita
- (in French) Diodorus Siculus, Universal History, Book XII, 9 at Philippe Remacle
- Dionysius of Halicarnassus, Roman Antiquities, Book X, 1-16, and Book X, 45-63 at LacusCurtius

=== Modern bibliography ===
- Broughton, T. Robert S. (1951), "The Magistrates of the Roman Republic", Philological Monographs, number XV, volume I, vol. I, 509 B.C. – 100 B.C., New York: The American Philological Association

Political offices
Preceded by Sextus Quinctilius; Publius Curiatius; Spurius Furius	Roman consul 452 BC with Titus Menenius Lanatus	Succeeded by Appius Claudius; Titus Genucius
