= Titus Menenius Lanatus (consul 452 BC) =

Roman senator, consul in 452 BC

- Office: Consul (452 BC)
- Children: Agrippa Menenius Lanatus

Titus Menenius Lanatus (fl. c. 452 BC) was a Roman senator during the 5th century BC. He served as consul in 452 BC.

== Consulship ==
In 452 BC, he was consul with Publius Sestius Capitolinus Vaticanus. During their consulship, the delegates left to study Greek law in Athens. After returning to Rome, the tribunes of the plebs called together officials to create a commission to write the law down. Publius Sestius supported this proposition, contrary to Titus Menenius, who pondered the question before falling ill; then he was rendered inactive until the end of his term as consul. Publius Sestius refused to take the initiative on his own in creating the commission. So he deferred the decision to the following year.

Titus Menenius was the father of Agrippa Menenius Lanatus, consul in 439 BC.

Political offices
Preceded by Sp. Furius Medullinus Fusus II; P. Curiatius Fistus Trigeminus	Roman consul 452 BC with P. Sestius Capitolinus Vaticanus	Succeeded by the Decemvirate
