= Lucius Siccius Dentatus =

5th century BC Roman politician and soldier

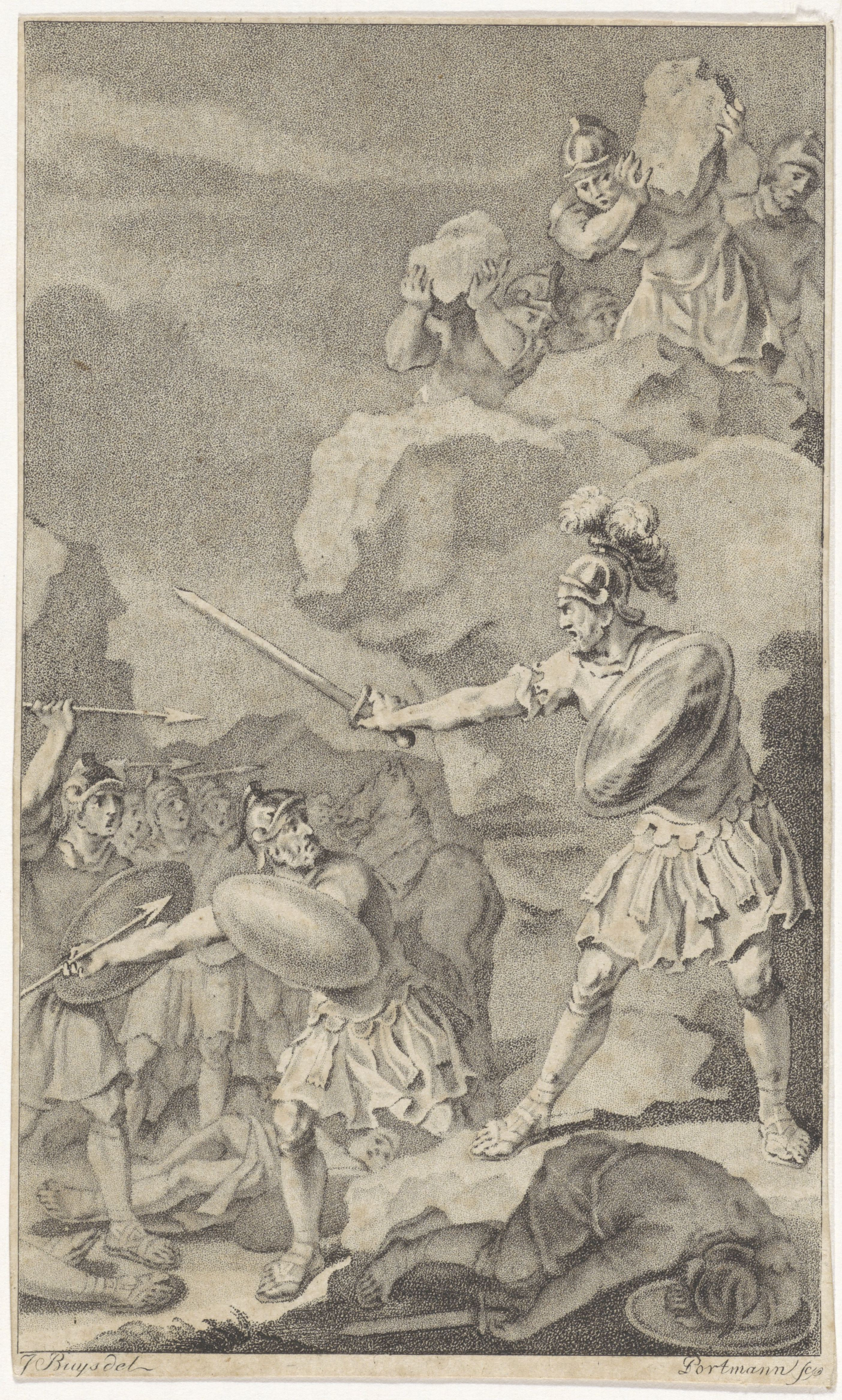
Engraving by Ludwig Gottlieb Portman depicting a Lucius Siccius Dentatus' last stand against soldiers ordered to murder him.

Lucius Siccius or Sicinius Dentatus (died c. 450 BC) was a Roman Legionaire, primus pilus, and tribune, famed for his martial bravery. He was cast as a champion of the plebeians in their struggle with the patricians. His cognomen Dentatus means "toothed" or "born with teeth". His exploits are likely fictitious.

Dionysius of Halicarnassus gives him the crucial role in a battle between the consul Titus Romilius Rocus Vaticanus of 455 BC and the Aequi. Sent on a suicide mission against the enemy camp, instead he captured it while the main force was inconclusively fighting the enemy; Siccius' achievement panicked the Aequians and sent them fleeing from the field, and achieved victory for the Romans. The following year (454 BC), after Romilius' term as consul ended, Dionysius reports that Siccius was elected as one of the tribunes of the plebs, he secured Romilius' conviction but mended relations when Romilius proposed a commission to travel to Greece and study their laws.

He was supposedly murdered for his opposition to the Second Decemvirate, which itself may be fictitious.

== Honours ==
According to various Roman antiquarian sources, likely originating largely from Varro, Siccius participated in many military campaigns. He engaged in a variety of military exploits, received many wounds, and was decorated with many honours. Aulus Gellius called him the "Roman Achilles". SP Oakley, a classicist, wrote in the Classical Quarterly that these exploits are "exaggerated beyond credibility".

Those antiquarian sources report that Siccius was eight times champion in single combat, with forty five scars on the front of his body and none on the rear. He is reported to have been awarded no less than eighteen hastae purae, twenty-five phalerae, 83 torques, more than 160 armillae, and twenty six coronae, of which fourteen were coronae civicae awarded for saving the life of a Roman citizen, eight coronae aureae, three coronae murales, and one corona obsidionalis or corona graminea, the highest honour for valour, awarded for the deliverer of a besieged army.

== See also ==
- Siccia gens
- Sicinia gens
