= Servius Sulpicius Camerinus Cornutus (consul 461 BC) =

Roman senator, consul in 461 BC

- Office: Consul (461 BC); Decemvir (451 BC)
- Children: Quintus Sulpicius Camerinus Cornutus

Servius Sulpicius Camerinus Cornutus (fl. c. 461–446 BC) was a Roman politician in the 5th century BC, consul in 461 BC and decemvir in 451 BC.

== Family ==
He was the son of Quintus Sulpicius Camerinus Cornutus (consul in 490 BC), and father of Quintus Sulpicius Camerinus Cornutus (military tribune with consular power in 402 BC and 398 BC).

== Biography ==
=== Consulship ===
In 461 BC, he was consul with Publius Volumnius Amintinus Gallus. Their terms occurred during a period of political tensions between the tribunes of the plebs, who demanded that the rights of the consuls be written down (drafted in the lex Terentilia) and the conservative patricians who opposed limitations to the consular power.

The consuls tried to raise troops against the Aequi and the Volsci, traditional enemies of Rome. The tribunes used their veto to block the levy. Four of the tribunes called the people to vote on their legal draft (the lex Terentilia). The consuls refused to preside over the ballot and young patricians provoked trouble. The political process was paralysed most of the year as a result. It is in this context that Aulus Verginius, one of the plebeian tribunes, brought the young Caeso Quinctius to trial on a capital charge of obstructing the tribunes of the plebs based primarily on the testimony of Marcus Volscius Fictor.

=== Decemvirate ===
In 454 BC, the patricians and the tribunes of the plebs came to a compromise and the Senate finally approved sending a delegation of three senators, among them Servius Sulpicius, to Athens and Southern Italy in order to study Greek law. Livy refers to Publius Sulpicius being a member of the delegation. However, given that the decemvirs in the First Decemvirate appear to be former consuls, it seems probable Servius Sulpicius was a member of the delegation as well.

The three Roman ambassadors returned in 452 BC and the report they gave to the Senate led to the creation of an extraordinary office, the decemviri consulari imperio legibus scribonis (decemviri writing the law with consular power). In 451 BC, Servius Sulpicius was in office while on the first commission of the decemvirs and participated in drafting the first ten of the twelve tables.

=== End of career ===
==== Fall of the decemvirs ====
In 449 BC, the Second Decemvirate had stayed in power illegally, contrary to the will of the patricians and the plebeians. The armies sent to combat the Aequi and the Sabines, commanded by eight of the ten decemvirs, revolted, returning to Rome and assembling on Monte Sacro, They demanded that the decemvirs step down. The consuls Servius Sulpicius, Spurius Tarpeius, and Gaius Julius had envoys negotiate with the plebs who had left the city. Finally, the decemvirs left their positions, eight went into exile while two were prosecuted in court, but took their own lives during the process.

==== Legate ====
In 446 BC, Servius Sulpicius would have been legate under the orders of the consuls Titus Quinctius Capitolinus Barbatus and Agrippa Furius Fusus during the campaign conducted against the Volsci.

== Bibliography ==
=== Ancient bibliography ===
- Livy, Ab urbe condita
- (in French) Diodorus Siculus, Universal History, Book XII, 9 on the site Philippe Remacle
- Dionysius of Halicarnassus, Roman Antiquities, Book X, 1-16, and Book X, 45-63 at LacusCurtius

=== Modern bibliography ===
- Broughton, T. Robert S. (1951), "The Magistrates of the Roman Republic", Philological Monographs, number XV, volume I, vol. I, 509 B.C. - 100 B.C., New York: The American Philological Association

Political offices
Preceded by Lucius Lucretius Tricipitinus; Titus Veturius Geminus Cicurinus	Roman consul 461 BC with Publius Volumnius Amintinus Gallus	Succeeded by Publius Valerius Poplicola; Gaius Claudius Sabinus Regillensis
