= Philippe Remacle =

Belgian Linguistics Professor

- Born: September 19, 1944; Warnant
- Died: March 11, 2011 (aged 66); Hannut

Academic background
- Education: Facultés Universitaires Notre-Dame in Namur; Catholic University of Leuven

Academic work
- Discipline: Latin and Hellinic studies
- Website: http://remacle.org

Philippe Remacle (September 19, 1944 in Warnant – March 11, 2011 in Hannut) was a Belgian Latinist and Hellenist, and professor of ancient languages. He created and developed the Remacle.org website devoted to ancient authors, recognized as a reference and working tool for French-speaking students and researchers in the field of ancient languages.

== Biography ==
Philippe Remacle studied at the Jesuit College in Tournai, in the Greco-Latin section, then at the Facultés Universitaires Notre-Dame in Namur, where he applied for a degree in classical philology, and finally at the Catholic University of Leuven, where he passed his licentiate and agrégation in 1967.

He began his career as a teacher of ancient languages at the Athénée de Rösrath in Germany. After his military service, he continued teaching in Ouffet and Hannut. In 1979, he was seconded to the youth section of the Belgian Confederation of Christian Trade Unions (CSC). While on secondment, he attended courses at the Open Faculty of Economic and Social Policy (FOPES) at the Catholic University of Leuven, and took up computer science. Enriched by this new knowledge, he and his fellow teachers set about researching and explaining ancient texts from a new pedagogical perspective. This work is expanding with the creation of a website on which he intends to collect, translate and illustrate ancient authors.

== Private life ==
Philippe Remacle married Marie Poncelet. They had two children, Jean-François and Anne-Sophie, who maintain the website created by their father.

== Website ==
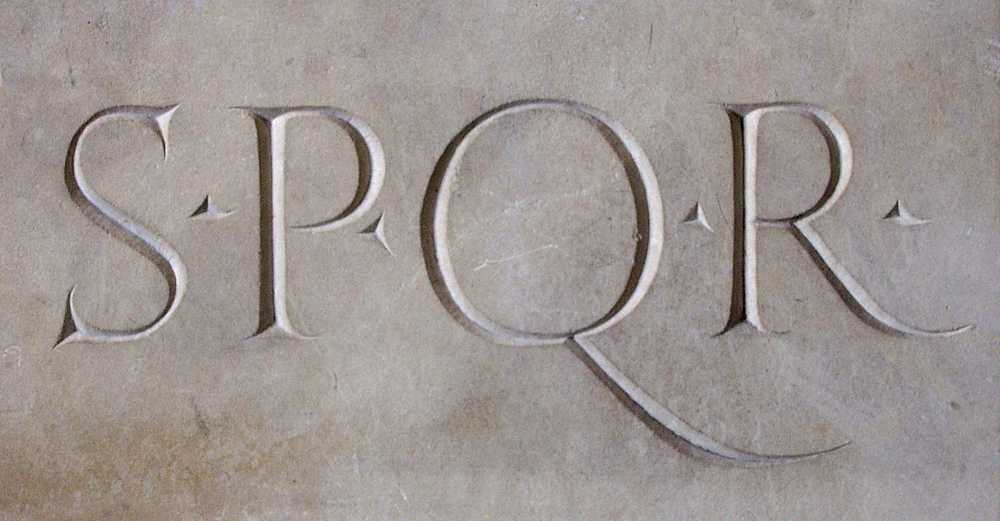
S.P.Q.R., designed and carved by John Howard Benson

Philippe Remacle's website is primarily a database of Latin and Greek texts. But it also includes ancient authors writing in Armenian, Chaldean and Syriac, as well as ancient texts by Italian, Iberian, Arabic, Persian and Balkan authors.

The site also provides general works on ancient institutions, commentaries on authors and various dictionaries. It is particularly rich in texts from late antiquity and the early Middle Ages.

Over the years, Philippe Remacle has built up resource for students and researchers of Antiquity and the Early Middle Ages. His colleagues and collaborators, with the support of his family, continue his work today.
