= LacusCurtius =

UChicago Greco-Roman history website

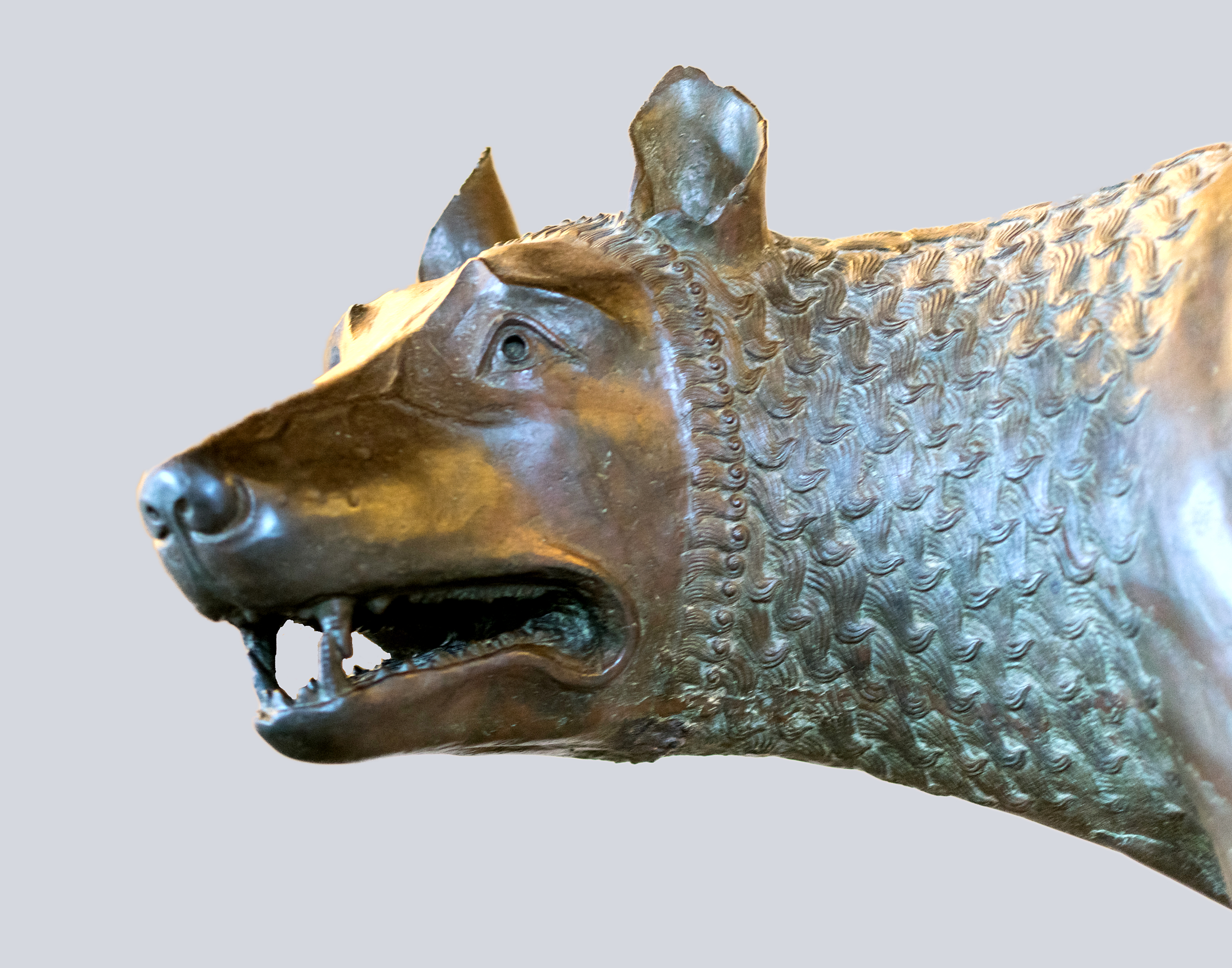
- The head of the Capitoline Wolf (pictured) is used as the icon for the website.
- Founded: August 26, 1997; 29 years ago (public)
- Area served: Worldwide
- Owner: Bill Thayer
- Website: penelope.uchicago.edu/Thayer/E/Roman/home.html
- Commercial: No
- Registration: No
- Current status: Active
- Written in: HTML, CSS, JavaScript, Java

LacusCurtius is the ancient Graeco-Roman part of a large history website, hosted as of March 2025 on a server at the University of Chicago. Starting in 1995, it now contains thousands of pages of print and hundreds of photographs, among other miscellanea. The overall site is the creation of William P. Thayer.

== Overview ==
The main resources to be found on it include:

- a number of Latin and Greek texts, usually in English translation, and often in the original language also
- Smith's Dictionary of Greek and Roman Antiquities
- Platner's Topographical Dictionary of Ancient Rome
- several secondary works, mostly on Rome and Roman Britain
- a photogazetteer of Roman remains and medieval churches of central Italy including the city of Rome
- an often-cited online copy of Richard Hinckley Allen's Star Names: Their Lore and Meaning
- the Antiquary's Shoebox, a selection of articles from classical studies journals that are now in public domain

The parent site also includes a large American history section (mostly military and naval history), sections on World War II history, British, French and Ukrainian history, and other materials, as well as a Gazetteer of Italy; the latter is somewhat of a misnomer, being almost entirely about central Italy, especially Umbria, for which it is a useful source.

In the early days of the site, LacusCurtius was often the only English source online for a number of the primary texts presented. The texts and translations are not scanned, but usually rekeyed by hand from Loeb Classical Library editions that had entered public domain, and less often from other sources. Though many of these primary texts could after a decade be found elsewhere on the web, Thayer's versions feature enhanced functions. They provide direct word-links to terms in Smith's Dictionary and other secondary sources on LacusCurtius and elsewhere, and often link quoted or cited passages to the full text of other ancient sources. Thayer corrects typographical errors in the Loeb editions, with a note on the original error, and on occasion provides his own commentary to update his source material, most of which is near or more than a century old.

In similar fashion, Thayer's edition of Smith's Dictionary is keyed in article by article, and is linked to other entries and to the primary sources cited. Each entry appears on an individual page, except for very short entries, which are collected on alphabetical index pages that link to the major articles. Thayer also provides topical indices for subjects such as the Roman military, law, and daily life. Thayer has stated that his interest in subject matter pertaining to ancient Greece is slim, and his selection from Smith's is predominantly Roman, with Greek topics included as they illuminate Roman texts.

The proper spelling of "LacusCurtius" is as a single CamelCase word, with no space; the idea was to avoid interfering with searches for the original Lacus Curtius in ancient Rome.

== Curation and assessment ==
As described by Randolph H. Lytton, emeritus professor of history and art history at George Mason University, in January 2004,

th[e] site has developed into an impressive array of primary and secondary resources on ancient Rome... [with n]ew materials are added regularly... [U]sing the gazetteer in the classroom, students can take a virtual tour of many of the major Roman archaeological sites, and learn about Roman social life through its material culture. / This is also an excellent site for studying historical geography... / The uniqueness of this site is the availability of translated works that are not readily available online... All the texts and translations have links for easy navigation between passages, footnotes, and other parts of this site. / The section on Latin Inscriptions is very useful... The photographs of the inscriptions are accompanied by helpful notes and are linked to a written transcription and the translated solution. The inscriptions are electronically indexed by geographical location and topic. / One of the best features of this site is the search engine. All of the texts and images can be accessed... Also included is a statement covering the copyright status for items... [and] a chart defining when published and unpublished works go into the public domain.

The compiler and editor, Bill Thayer, describes himself thus:

By profession I'm a simultaneous interpreter (French/English) specializing in mechanical engineering and the financial markets. In Roman history, art history, archaeology, architecture, etc. I have no credentials at all, but then those of you who are professionals in the various disciplines covered in this site will have seen that right away!
