= Decemviri =

10-man commission in the Roman Republic

The decemviri or decemvirs (Latin for "ten men") refer to official ten-man commissions established by the Roman Republic.

The most important were those of the two decemvirates, formally the decemvirate with consular power for writing laws (Latin: decemviri consulari imperio legibus scribundis) who reformed and codified Roman law during the Conflict of the Orders between ancient Rome's patrician aristocracy and plebeian commoners. Other decemviri include the decemviri for adjudging litigation (decemviri stlitibus judicandis), the decemviri for making sacrifices (decemviri sacris faciundis), and the decemviri for the assignment and giving of arable lands (decemviri agris dandis adsignandis).

== Decemviri consulari imperio legibus scribundis ==
=== Background ===
Gaius Terentilius Harsa, a plebeian tribune, wished to protect the plebeian population by curtailing the power of the Roman consuls. To do this, he proposed a law in 462 BC which provided for a five-man commission to define their power. The patricians were opposed to this curtailment and managed to postpone the debate on this law for eight years. In 454 BC the plebeian tribunes dropped their pursuit of this law. They asked the senate to "consent to the appointment of a body of legislators, chosen in equal numbers from plebeians and patricians to enact what would be useful to both orders and secure equal liberty for each". The patricians replied that this was worthy of consideration, but said that only patricians could legislate. Although disputed by historians such as Niebuhr, Cornell and Grant, according to Livy and Dionysius, three envoys were sent to Athens to study the Law of Solon and question more about the laws of Greek city-states.

In 452 BCE the envoys "returned with the laws of Athens". The plebeian tribunes pressed to begin the compilation of the laws. It was agreed to appoint decemviri with consular powers which would not be subject to appeal and were to suspend both the consulship and the plebeian tribunate. Thus establishing the decemvirate as a political institution with the power to compile laws. After a debate about whether plebeians should sit on the decemvirate, the plebeian tribunes agreed to a patrician-only panel in exchange for a law they had passed not being repealed.

=== First decemvirate ===
The decemviri took office in 451 BC. Both consuls, Appius Claudius Crassus Inregillensis Sabinus and Titus Genucius Augurinus, resigned as well as the other magistrates and the plebeian tribunes. In compensation for their loss of office, Appius Claudius and Titus Genucius were appointed to the decemviri. Publius Sestius Capitolinus Vaticanus, one of the consuls of the previous year, was also appointed because he had put the proposal to the senate despite the opposition of his colleague. The three envoys were also part of the decemviri. The most influential member was Appius Claudius who, according to Livy, "was the guiding hand in the whole magistracy ... thanks to the favour of the plebs". Each day a different decemvir presided over the magistracy and this man had the twelve lictors (the bodyguards of the consuls) with fasces (bound bundles of rods, sometimes with axes, which were the symbol of supreme authority). The decemvirate was not subject to appeal, despite this, they yielded to one another when an appeal was taken. They drafted their laws on ten bronze tables and presented them to the people, asked for feedback and amended them accordingly. They were approved by the higher popular assembly, the Assembly of the Soldiers. There was a general feeling that two more tables were needed to have a corpus of all Roman law. It was decided to elect a new decemvirate.

The first decemvirate consisted of:

- Appius Claudius Crassus Inregillensis Sabinus
- Titus Genucius Augurinus
- Titus Veturius Geminus Cicurinus
- Gaius Julius Iullus
- Aulus Manlius Vulso
- Servius Sulpicius Camerinus Cornutus
- Publius Sestius Capitolinus Vaticanus
- Publius Curiatius Fistus Trigeminus
- Titus Romilius Rocus Vaticanus
- Spurius Postumius Albus Regillensis

=== Second decemvirate ===
According to Livy, Appius Claudius rigged the election and announced the election of himself and nine men who were his supporters. Livy writes that these officials became tyrannical, each man had twelve lictors and each fasces had axes. He describes this decemvirate conducting trials behind closed doors and issuing arbitrary judgements. Due to these possible actions, they may have become a source of fear in ancient Rome, striking terror into those who saw them. Livy states that there were rumors that the officials in the second decemvirate wished to rule perpetually. When time for the elections came, they were not held, and the decemviri became violent.

A Sabine and an Aequi army attacked Roman territory and an ally of Rome. According to Livy, the decemviri summoned the senate, but the senators did not show up due to their disgust. To the plebeians this signaled the illegitimacy of the decemviri as their term had expired and were now meant to be just private citizens. They were considering boycotting the military draft. Again, the senate was summoned, and this time some senators attended. The plebeians saw this as a betrayal of liberty. However, the senators denounced the decemviri and tried to oppose them, called them private citizens and refused to call a levy. In the end they allowed its proclamation of the levy in silence because they feared a popular uprising would bolster the plebeian tribunes, their political adversaries. The plebeians enlisted because they feared violent reprisal as there was no right to appeal. Some of the decemviri led two armies against the two enemies. However, both armies were routed.

Livy alleged that Appius Claudius was sexually interested in Verginia, the daughter of a plebeian, Lucius Verginius, who was a centurion absent from Rome with the army. Having failed to woo her with money and promises, Appius Claudius decided to seize this opportunity to get one of his men to claim her as his slave. She was dragged off her feet in the forum and the shouts of her nurses attracted a crowd. The claimant said that he was acting lawfully and had summoned her to court. Verginia went to court followed by her friends and acquaintances. The judge was Appius Claudius. The claimant said that the girl was born at his house and then he persuaded Verginius to take her, but that she still was his slave. Verginia's friends asked for an adjournment until Verginius could attend and to leave Verginia in the custody of the defendants.

Appius Claudius agreed to summon Verginius but put Verginia in the custody of the claimant. Verginia's lover, Icilius, arrived at the forum, but was stopped by a lictor. He pleaded his case loudly and attracted the attention of the crowd. Verginia's supporters sent a relative and Icilius' brother to quickly go to Verginius' military camp. The claimant pressed Icilius to pay surety to be Verginia's guarantor. Many people offered money and Verginia was bailed to her family.

Appius Claudius wrote to his colleagues at the camp not to grant Verginius leave and to arrest him. However, the messengers had already arrived and Verginius had already been given leave. At dawn a crowd was waiting to see what would happen. Verginius arrived, leading his daughter and a large mass of supporters. He motivated people for help to claim his due. The matrons accompanying Verginia began to cry, this display moved the populace towards Icillus' side.

Appius Claudius upheld the fabricated case of the claimant and adjudged Verginia to him without even listening to Verginius. Livy wrote that the crowd was stunned by this. When the claimant made his way to take her, Verginius shouted that he had betrothed Verginia to Icilius, not to Appius Claudius, and that he did not bring her up for dishonor. Appius Claudius claimed that he knew that there had been seditious meetings and told Verginius to be quiet and the lictors to seize the slave (Verginia). The crowd did not react. According to Livy, Verginius stabbed his daughter to death saying that was the only way he could assert her freedom. Appius Claudius ordered his arrest, but the crowd protected him as he made his way to the city gate. As a result, the crowd talked about restoring the plebeian tribunes and the right to appeal.

The second decemvirate consisted of:

- Appius Claudius Crassus Inregillensis Sabinus
- Marcus Cornelius Maluginensis
- Lucius Sergius Esquilinus
- Lucius Minucius Esquilinus Augurinus
- Quintus Fabius Vibulanus
- Quintus Poetelius Libo Visolus
- Titus Antonius Merenda
- Kaeso Duillius Longus
- Spurius Oppius Cornicen
- Manius Rabuleius

=== Second plebeian secession ===
According to Livy, Appius Claudius ordered the arrest of Icilius, but the crowd prevented this. Two patricians, Lucius Valerius Potitus and Marcus Horatius Barbatus pushed the lictors back, announcing that "if Appius proceeded legally, they would protect Icilius from the prosecution of a mere citizen; if he sought to make use of violence, there too they would be a match for him". Appius Claudius, Lucius Valerius, and Marcus Horatius made speeches. The crowd booed the former and listened only to the latter two, who ordered the lictors to back off. Appius Claudius fled. Another decemvir, not knowing what to do, ended up summoning the senate. The senators were hostile to the decemviri and there was hope that they would bring them down. However, the senators were concerned that the arrival of Verginius at the military camp would cause unrest and sent messengers to tell the commanders to keep the troops from mutiny. Verginius, who had been followed by nearly four hundred men, caused an even bigger stir with the soldiers than in the city. He told his fellow soldiers to "look out for themselves and for their own children" and they replied that they "would not forget his sufferings nor fail to vindicate their liberty". The civilians who had come with Verginius to the military camp claimed that the decemviri had been overthrown and that Appius Claudius had gone into exile and incited the soldiers to rise up.

These soldiers, who were from the army which had been sent against the Aequi, marched to Rome and took possession of the Aventine Hill. They urged the plebeians to regain their freedom and elect the plebeian tribunes. The senate decided to take no harsh action as it had been partly responsible for the mutiny. It sent three envoys to inquire who had seized the Aventine, who their leaders were and what they wanted. The mutineers did not have a leader, and no one dared to express enmity. The civilian crowd shouted that they wanted Lucius Valerius and Marcus Horatius to be the envoys. Verginius proposed the election of ten leaders to be given the military title, military tribune. Verginius was elected.

At the instigation of Icilius, the soldiers of the Roman armies located in Sabine territories also rebelled. On hearing of the election of military tribunes at the Aventine, Icilius, thinking that these men would then be elected as plebeian tribunes and wanting to become one himself, arranged the election of the same number of "military tribunes" among these soldiers, who headed for Rome, marched through the city and to the Aventine. When they joined the other army, the twenty "military tribunes" appointed two men, Marcus Oppius and Sextus Manilius, to take command.

According to Livy, the senators, who were convening daily, spent most of the time squabbling. They decided to send Valerius and Horatius to the Aventine on the condition that the decemviri resign. The latter said that they would do so only after the enactment of the two tables of laws for which they were elected. Given that the senate kept bickering, the soldiers decided to secede to Mons Sacer as they had done in 494 BC to increase pressure on the senators and the decemviri. They now demanded the restoration of tribunician power (i.e. the reinstatement of the plebeian tribunes) and they would stand firm to obtain this. On their way through the city, they were joined by civilian plebeians. The senate hesitated because of the enmity between senators and plebeian tribunes. Some senators, including Valerius and Horatius, argued that their restoration was needed in order to both get rid of the decemviri and restore patrician magistrates. The decemviri agreed to step down on the condition that they would get personal protection against any reprisals.

Lucius Valerius and Marcus Horatius were sent to negotiate terms with the plebeians at their discretion. The plebeians welcomed and thanked them because of their previous stand at the forum. They demanded the recovery of the protections the plebeians enjoyed through the plebeian tribunes and the right to appeal, immunity for those who incited the rebellion and harsh punishment for the decemviri. The envoys agreed on the first three demands and asked that the issue of punishment be postponed. The plebeians accepted this. The senate decreed the abdication of the decemviri, the election of the plebeian tribunes and the mentioned immunity. The plebeians returned to Rome and elected their tribunes. The plebeian council carried a motion of immunity and passed a bill for the election of consuls subject to appeal.

=== Valerio-Horatian laws (leges Valeriae Horatiae) ===
Lucius Valerius Potitius and Marcus Horatius Barbatus were elected as consuls. They passed the Valerio-Horatian Laws (Leges Valeriae Horatiae). The first law provided that the resolutions of the plebeian council were binding on the people. Then "they not only restored a consular law about the appeal, but they also safeguarded it for the future by the solemn enactment of a new law, that no one should declare the election of any magistrate without appeal, and that he who should so declare might be put to death [by anyone] without offence to law or religion, and that such a homicide should not be held a capital crime". They also reinstated the principle of the sacrosanctity of the plebeian tribunes "by restoring certain long-neglected ceremonies" and by putting what had been just a religious sanction into the statutes with a law which extended it to all plebeian magistrates, including the aediles and the decemviral judges. Additionally, they specified that the heads of those who violated these ceremonies were to be forfeited to Jupiter and their property sold at the temple of Ceres, Liber, and Libera. They also introduced the practice of delivering the decrees of the senate to the aediles at the temple of Ceres, "[u]p to that time they were wont to be suppressed or falsified, at the pleasure of the consuls". In addition, the plebeian council passed a law whereby those who left the plebeians without tribunes or elected a magistrate without appeal were to be scourged and beheaded. Livy noted that all the measures were passed against the will of the patricians, but they did not actively oppose them.

=== The Twelve Tables ===
The two consuls marched with their armies to confront the Sabines and the Aequi who had not withdrawn. "Before they left the city, the consuls had the decemviral laws, which are known as the Twelve Tables, engraved on bronze, and set them up in a public area. Some authors say that the aediles, acting under orders from the tribunes, performed this service".

=== Views of modern historians ===
The reason the first decemvirate had a dual role, as a new magistracy which replaced the consuls and took on governance with extraordinary powers, and as a commission for compiling law, is not explained by the sources. Some modern historians have grappled with this as an apparent contradiction.

A theory has tried to explain this contradiction by positing that the first decemvirate differed from the second one by being a commission to compile laws, while the latter was a permanent governing body. Theodor Mommsen criticized this for not having any support from the sources. Cornell notes that if this was the case the consuls and the plebeian tribunes would have been suspended at the start of the second decemvirate instead of the first. Moreover, that the second decemvirate was elected because it was felt that two new tables were needed implies that the decemvirate was meant to be a temporary body for the duration of the drawing up of the laws. So does the second decemvirate's attempt to prolong its office by pretending that they were still working on the final two tables.

The decemvirate's role as a new magistracy which replaced the consuls and the plebeian tribunes has been interpreted as being intended to reintegrate the plebeians into the Roman state by doing away with the plebeian tribunes. If this was the case, the fact that Livy seemed to suggest that only patricians sat on the first decemvirate would be a contradiction. This and the fact that one of the decemviri was Titus Genucius Augurinus, who had a plebeian name, have led some historians to reject both that this man was a decemvir and the existence of a second decemvirate, which they see as fiction. Mommsen argued that the decemvirate must have been open to plebeians from the beginning.

Some historians see the sharp contrast between the first, good decemvirate and the second, bad one as a legend to explain the Twelve Tables in general being good while the prohibition of marriage between patricians and plebeians was bad. This bad law was fictively ascribed to a second body of bad decemvirs. However, Cornell argues that this view is problematic. He asks two questions. If this was a fiction to explain this law, why were the last two tables (one of which contained this law) published by the consuls in 449 BC after the deposition of the bad decemvirate? Why was a law banning marriage between patricians and plebeians drawn up by a body composed by both patricians and plebeians (the majority of the members of the second decemvirate being plebeians)?

In 2005, historian Gary Forsythe dismissed the second decemvirate as unhistorical. He presents a number of arguments for his view. First, it is an invention modeled on the story of the Thirty Tyrants. Athens was forced to abolish her democracy following her defeat by Sparta and it was replaced by a commission tasked with drafting the laws of a new constitution. They arrested and executed political opponents and seized power. Many Athenians fled or were exiled. They formed a militia and reached Peiraeus (Piraeus, the port of Athens), defeated the forces sent by the Thirty Tyrants, and then forced them to abdicate and restored democracy. Forsythe sees similarities with the story of the decemviri, where the republican offices are suspended and replaced by the decemviri who were also tasked with drafting new laws, who then refused to leave office when their term was up, became tyrannical, were forced to resign by a secession and the republican offices were restored. Second, the story fits with the Greek theory that a good form of government gives way to its corrupt counterpart, which, in turn, leads back to another good one. The first decemvirate represents "ideal aristocratic rule in its ideal form, followed by the corrupt oligarchy of the second one whose misrule leads to rebellion and further political change". Third, one year and one decemvirate should have been enough to draw up a legislation which was not overly complicated.

Forsythe also says that the idea of the decemviri being overthrown "might have been suggested to later Roman historians by the names of the consuls for 449 BC, Lucius Valerius Potitus and Marcus Horatius Barbatus". They were similar to the names of the consuls for 509 BC, the year of the establishment of the Roman republic (Publius Valerius Publicola and Marcus Horatius Pulvillus). The republic was instituted with the overthrow of the last king of Rome, who was a tyrant, in a rebellion and the decision to do away with the monarchy.

Cornell thinks that the story of the second decemvirate attracted much secondary elaboration (later additions), that some of this at times romanticized it and that parts of the story are fictitious, but that it cannot be proved the whole story was fictive and more convincing cases have to be made to support this view. He adds that "identifying the fictitious parts is no easier than deciding which parts might be based on genuine fact". He also notes that the tradition of two decemvirates and the division of the tables into groups of ten and two were already around in the mid-second century BC. Therefore, although the later historians who have given us the accounts of the decemvirate might have added additional elaborations, there is no evidence that they made up the core story.

Doubts have been cast about the story of Appius Claudius and Verginia. Appius Claudius was the victim of a later tradition of hostility towards the Claudii, his family (Mommsen showed traces of this, but did not see it as a reason for rejecting the story); the character of Verginia bears similarities with that of Lucretia, whose rape led to the overthrow of the monarchy (Ogilvie notes that in the original story might not have provided names and that she may have been referred to as 'a maiden' and the name Verginia was ascribed to her later, but she did exist); the story was the subject of a traditional ballade. Cornell argues that such objections do not prove that "the story is a later invention".

The story of the embassy to Athens to study the Law of Solon is unlikely. If it had gone to Athens, by that time the Law of Solon would have been replaced by the radical reforms of Pericles in the first half of the 5th century BC. Cornell notes that the fragments of the Law of the Twelve Tables show many signs of Greek influence and even some Greek loan-words. He thinks that the source was likely to have been the Greek cities of southern Italy and that it is there that efforts to familiarize with Greek written laws would have been directed. He also points out that according to an alternative tradition the decemviri were advised by Hermodorus of Ephesus, a Greek philosopher in exile.

== Decemviri stlitibus judicandis ==
The decemviri stlitibus judicandis ("the ten men who judge lawsuits") was a civil court of ancient origin (traditionally attributed to King Servius Tullius) mainly concerned with questions bearing on the status of individuals. It originally served as a jury rendering verdicts under the presidency of the praetor, but these decemviri subsequently became annual minor magistrates (magistratus minores) of the Republic, elected by the Comitia Populi Tributa and forming part of the Vigintisexviri ("Twenty-Six Men").

Suetonius and Dio Cassius record that during the Principate, Caesar Augustus transferred to the decemviri the presidency in the courts of the Centumviri ("Hundred Men"). Under imperial law, the decemvirate had jurisdiction in capital cases.

== Decemviri sacris faciundis ==
The decemviri sacris faciundis (also called the decemviri sacrorum) had religious functions and was the outcome of the claim of the plebs to equal share in the administration of the state religion (five decemviri were plebeians, five were patricians). They were first appointed in 367 BC in lieu of the patrician duumviri ("Two Men") who had had responsibility for the care and consultation of the Sibylline books and the celebration of the games of Apollo. Membership in this ecclesiastical college (collegium) was for life, and the college was increased to a quindecimvirate—that is, a college of fifteen members—and renamed accordingly (see quindecimviri sacris faciundis) in the last century of the Republic, possibly by the dictator Lucius Cornelius Sulla; the dictator Gaius Julius Caesar added a sixteenth member, but this precedent was not followed.

== Decemviri agris dandis adsignandis ==
The decemviri agris dandis adsignandis was appointed from time to time to control the distribution of public lands (ager publicus). Members of such boards had three-fold powers: to determine which lands were public and private, to assign to a person a secure right to use that land, and to give that land outright to a person. A number of such commissions were created or have been suggested by scholars: one ten-man board was possibly created in 201 BC to distribute lands to Scipio Africanus' veterans, one in 173 for lands in Liguria and Gaul, most famously one created by the 100 BC lex Appuleia passed by plebeian tribune Lucius Appuleius Saturninus, and late one created in 91 BC. The previous boards for public lands created by the Gracchi had only three men.

== See also ==
- Constitution of the Roman Republic
- Triumvirate – Regime dominated by three individuals
- Septemvir
- Vigintisexviri – College of minor magistrates of the Roman Republic
