= Twelve Tables =

Roman statute forming the law

The Twelve Tables (Latin: Lex Duodecim Tabularum) was the legislation that stood at the foundation of Roman law. Formally promulgated in 449 BC, the Tables consolidated earlier traditions into an enduring set of laws.

In the Forum, "The Twelve Tables" stated the rights and duties of the Roman citizen. Their formulation was the result of considerable agitation by the plebeian class, who had hitherto been excluded from the higher benefits of the Republic. The law had previously been unwritten and exclusively interpreted by upper-class priests, the pontifices. Something of the regard with which later Romans came to view the Twelve Tables is captured in the remark of Cicero (106–43 BC) that the "Twelve Tables...seems to me, assuredly to surpass the libraries of all the philosophers, both in weight of authority, and in plenitude of utility". Cicero scarcely exaggerated; the Twelve Tables formed the basis of Roman law for a thousand years.

The Twelve Tables are sufficiently comprehensive that their substance has been described as a "code", although modern scholars consider this characterization exaggerated. The Tables are a sequence of definitions of various private rights and procedures. They generally took for granted such things as the institutions of the family and various rituals for formal transactions. The provisions were often highly specific and diverse.

== Drafting and development ==
There is no scholarly agreement about the exact historical account of the creation and promulgation of the laws of the Twelve Tables. Ancient writers' stories about the Twelve Tables were recorded a couple of centuries later, in the second and first centuries BC. The first known publications of the text of the Twelve Tables were prepared by the first Roman jurists. Sextus Aelius Paetus Catus (consul in 198 BC) in his work on jurisprudence called Tripartita included a version of the laws of the Twelve Tables, his commentary on them and the legal formulas (legis actiones) to use them in trials. Lucius Acilius Sapiens was another early interpreter of the Twelve Tables in the middle of the second century BC. Meanwhile Roman historians Livy and Dionysius of Halicarnassus provided the most detailed accounts of the creation of the laws. In addition, different versions of the story are known from the works of Diodorus Siculus and Sextus Pomponius.

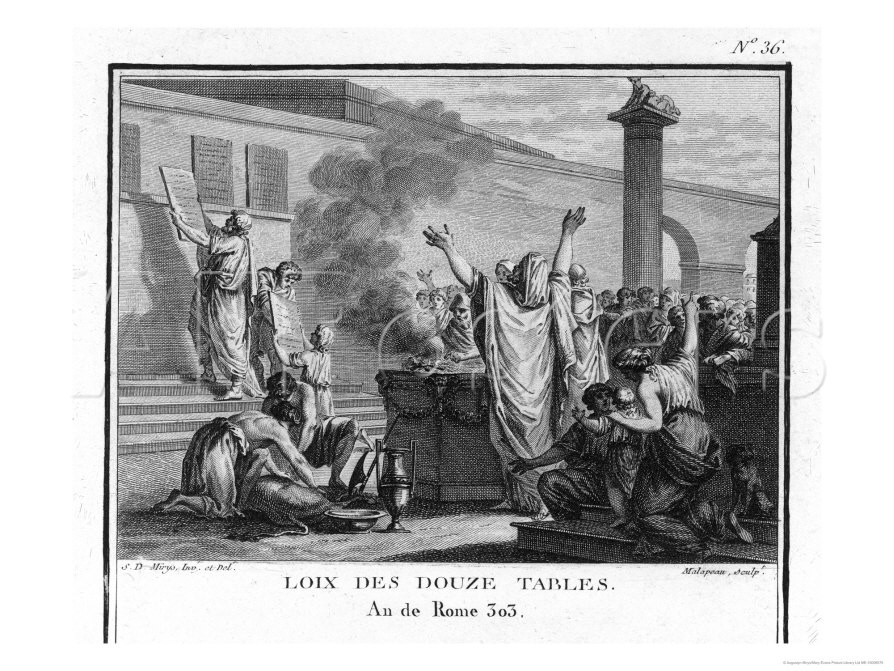
Publication of the Twelve Tables in Rome, approx. 2 BC. Drawing by Silvestre David Mirys (1742–1810); engraved by Claude-Nicolas Malapeau (1755–1803)

According to Livy and Dionysius of Halicarnassus, the laws of the Twelve Tables have come about as a result of the long social struggle between patricians and plebeians, in modern scholarship known as the conflict of the orders. After the expulsion of the last king of Rome, Tarquinius Superbus, in 509 BC, the Republic was governed by a hierarchy of magistrates. Initially, only patricians were eligible to become magistrates and this, among other plebeian complaints, was a source of discontent for plebeians. In the context of this unequal status, plebeians would take action to secure concessions for themselves using the threat of secession. They would threaten to leave the city with the consequence that it would grind to a halt, as the plebeians were Rome's labor force. Tradition held that one of the most important concessions won in this class struggle was the establishment of the Twelve Tables, establishing basic procedural rights for all Roman citizens in relation to each other. The drafting of the Twelve Tables may have been fomented by a desire for self-regulation by the patricians, or for other reasons.

Around 450 BC, the first decemviri (decemvirate, board of "Ten Men") were appointed to draw up the first ten tables. According to Livy, they sent an embassy to Greece to study the legislative system of Athens, known as the Solonian Constitution, but also to find out about the legislation of other Greek cities. Some scholars deny that the Romans imitated the Greeks in this respect or suggest that they visited only the Greek cities of Southern Italy, and did not travel all the way to Greece. In 450 BC, the second decemviri started to work on the last two tables.

The first decemvirate completed the first ten codes in 450 BC. Here is how Livy describes their creation:

"...every citizen should quietly consider each point, then talk it over with his friends, and, finally, bring forward for public discussion any additions or subtractions which seemed desirable." (cf. Liv. III.34)

In 449 BC, the second decemvirate completed the last two codes, and after a secessio plebis (secession of the plebes, a plebeian protest) to force the Senate to consider them, the Law of the Twelve Tables was formally promulgated. According to Livy the Twelve Tables were inscribed on bronze (Pomponius alone says on ivory), and posted publicly, so all Romans could read and know them.

== Laws of the Twelve Tables ==
The laws of the Twelve Tables were a way to publicly display rights that each citizen had in the public and private sphere. These Twelve Tables displayed what was previously understood in Roman society as the unwritten laws. The public display of the tablets allowed for a more balanced society between the Roman patricians who were educated and understood the laws of legal transactions, and the Roman plebeians who had little education or experience in understanding law. By revealing the unwritten rules of society to the public, the Twelve Tables provided a means of safeguard for Plebeians allowing them the opportunity to avoid financial exploitation and added balance to the Roman economy.

Some of the provisions are procedural to ensure fairness among all Romans in the courts, while other established legal terms dictating the legality of capital crimes, intentional homicide, treason, perjury, judicial corruption, and writing slanderous poems. The Romans valued keeping peace in the city and the Twelve Tables were a mechanism of establishing and continuing peace and equality.

Table 1	Procedure: for courts and trials
Table 2	Further enactments on trials
Table 3	Execution of judgments
Table 4	Rights of familial heads
Table 5	Legal guardianship and inheritance laws
Table 6	Acquisition and possession
Table 7	Land rights and crimes
Table 8	Torts and delicts (Laws of injury)
Table 9	Public law
Table 10	Sacred law
Table 11	Supplement I
Table 12	Supplement II

=== Tables I & II: Procedure for Courts and Judges and Further Enactments on Trials ===
These two tables are concerned with Roman court proceedings. Table I covers proceedings between the defendant and the plaintiff, with responses to potential situations such as when age or illness prevents the defendant from making an appearance, then transportation has to be arranged to assist them. It also deals with:

- The failure of appearance by the defendant.
- If there is a failure to appear by either party, then after noon the judge must make judgement in favor of the one who is present.
- Provides a time-table for the trial (ends at sunset)

Table II sets the amount of financial stake for each party depending on the source of litigation, what to do in case of impairment of the judge, and rules of who must present evidence.

=== Table III: Execution of Judgment ===
Featured within the Twelve Tables are five rules about how to execute judgments, in terms of debtors and creditors. These rules show how the ancient Romans maintained peace with financial policy.

In the book, The Twelve Tables, written by an anonymous source due to its origins being collaborated through a series of translations of tablets and ancient references, P.R. Coleman-Norton arranged and translated many of the significant features of debt that the Twelve Tables enacted into law during the 5th century. The translation of the legal features surrounding debt and derived from the known sources of the Twelve Tables are stated as such

“1. Of debt acknowledged and for matters judged in court (in iure) thirty days shall be allowed by law [for payment or for satisfaction].

2. After that [elapse of thirty days without payment] hand shall be laid on (Manus infection) [the debtor]. He shall be brought into court (in ius).

3. Unless he (the debtor) discharges the debtor unless someone appears in court (in iure) to guarantee payment for him, he (the creditor) shall take [the debtor] with him. He shall bind [him] either with a thong or with fetters, of which the weight shall be not less than fifteen pounds or shall be more if he (the creditor) chooses.

4. If he (the debtor) chooses, he shall live on his own [means]. If he lives not on his own [means], [the creditor,] who shall hold him in bonds, shall give [him] a pound of bread daily; if he (the creditor) shall so desire, he shall give [him] more.

5. Unless they (the debtors) make a compromise, they (the debtors) shall be held in bonds for sixty days. During those days they shall be brought to [the magistrate] into the comitia (meeting-place) on three successive markets […]”

The five mandates of the Twelve Tables encompassing debt created a new understanding within social classes in ancient Rome that ensured financial exploitation would be limited within legal business transactions.

=== Table IV: Right of Familial Heads ===
The fourth table of the Twelve Tables deals with the specific rights of Patriarchs of families. One of the first proclamations of Table IV was that "dreadfully deformed" children must be quickly euthanized. It also explains that sons are born into the inheritance of their family. Babies with physical and mental diseases must be killed by the father himself. If a husband no longer wants to be married to his wife he can remove her from their household and "order her to mind her own affairs" Not all of the codes of table IV are to the benefit of only the patriarch. If a father attempts to sell his son three times then the son earns his freedom from the father.

=== Tables V, VI & X: Women ===
The Twelve Tables have three sections that pertain to women as they concern estates and guardianship, ownership and possession, and religion, which give a basic understanding as to the legal rights of women and girls.

- Table V (Estates and Guardianship): "Female heirs should remain under guardianship even when they have attained the age of majority, but exception is made for the Vestal Virgins."
- Table VI (Ownership and Possession): "Where a woman, who has not been united to a man in marriage, lives with him for an entire year without interruption of three nights, she shall pass into his power as his legal wife."
- Table X (Religion): "Women shall not during a funeral lacerate their faces, or tear their cheeks with their nails; nor shall they utter loud cries bewailing the dead."

One of the aspects highlighted in the Twelve Tables is a woman's legal status and standing in society. Women were considered to be under a form of guardianship similar to that of minors, and sections on ownership and possession give the impression that women were considered to be akin to a piece of real estate or property due to the use of terms such as "ownership" and "possession".

=== Table VII: Land Rights and Crimes ===
This table outlines attitudes towards property. The following are all rules about property:

- Boundary disputes are settled by third-parties.
- Road widths are eight feet wide on straight parts and double that on turns.
- People who live near the road are in charge of maintaining it; if a road is not well maintained then carts and animals can be ridden where the riders wish.
- Property owners can request removal of trees that have been blown onto their property
- Fruit that falls from a tree onto a neighbor's property still belongs to the original tree owner.

=== Table VIII: Torts and Delicts (Laws of Injury) ===
Torts are laws dealing with litigating wrongs that occur between citizens. One such situation is that of physical injury, retaliation for which can range from dealing the perpetrator with an injury in kind, to monetary compensation to the injured. This table also establishes the legal ramifications for damage dealt to property by animals and damage dealt to crops by people or animals. The penalty for stealing crops is hanging as sacrifice to Ceres.

The table also describes several laws dealing with theft.

=== Table IX: Public Law ===
This section of the tables makes it illegal for anyone to define what a citizen of Rome is with the exception of the greatest assembly, or maximus comitatus. It also outlaws the execution of those who are unconvicted, bribery of judges, and extradition of a citizen to enemy powers.

=== The Supplements: Tables XI & XII ===
- Table XI (Marriage Between Classes): A person of a certain class shall not partake in marriage with a person of a lower class.
- Table XII (Binding into Law): If a slave shall have committed theft or done damage with his master's knowledge, the action for damages is in the slave's name.

== Influence and significance ==
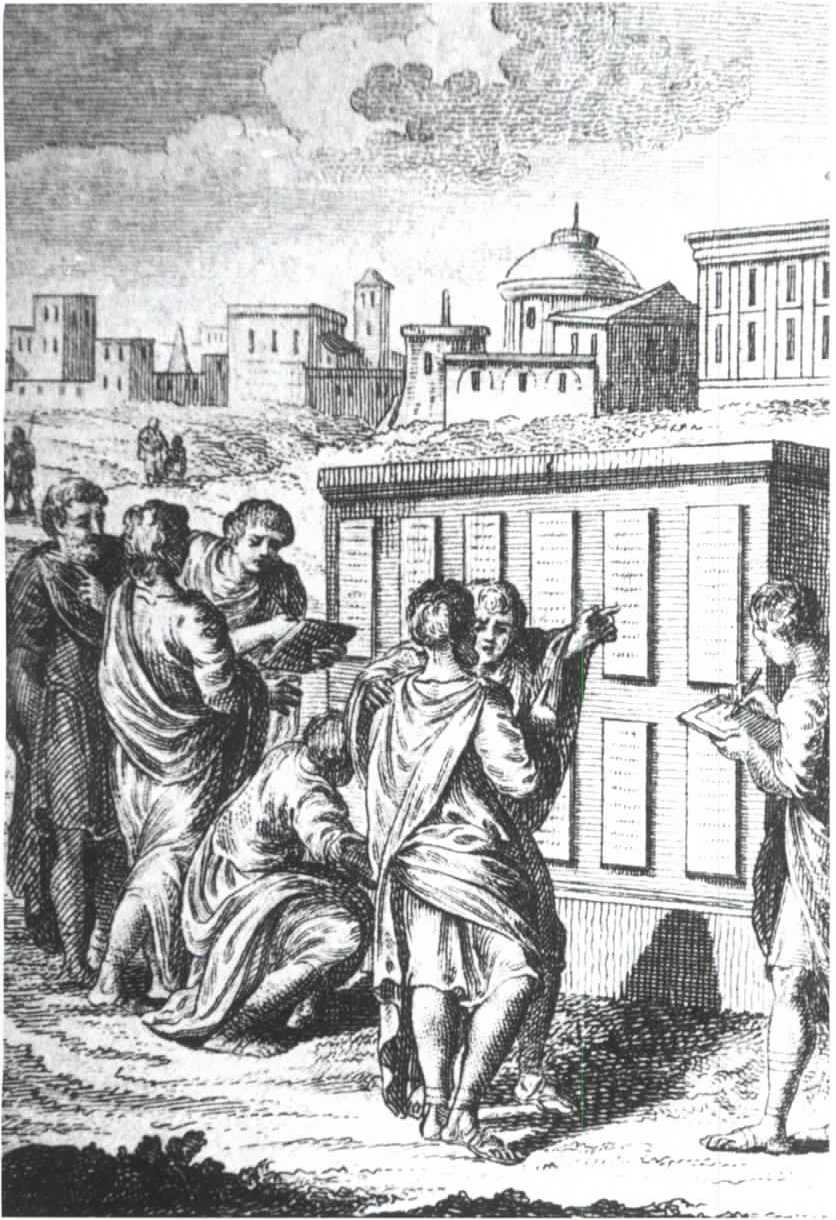
Roman civilians examining the Twelve Tables after they were first implemented.

The Twelve Tables are often cited as the foundation for ancient Roman law. The Twelve Tables provided an early understanding of some key concepts such as justice, equality, and punishment. Although legal reform occurred soon after the implementation of the Twelve Tables, these ancient laws provided social protection and civil rights for both the patricians and plebeians. At this time, there was extreme tension between the privileged class and the common people resulting in the need for some form of social order. While the existing laws had major flaws that were in need of reform, the Twelve Tables eased the civil tension and violence between the plebeians and patricians.

The Twelve Tables also heavily influenced and are referenced in later Roman Laws texts, especially The Digest of Justinian I. Such laws from The Digest that are derived from the Twelve Tables are the legal recompense for damage caused by an animal, protocol for inheritances, and also laws about structural property damage.

The influence of the Twelve Tables is still evident in modern day. The Twelve Tables played a significant role in the basis of the early American legal system. Political theorists, such as James Madison have highlighted the importance of the Twelve Tables in crafting the United States Bill of Rights. The idea of property was also perpetuated in the Twelve Tables, including the different forms of money, land, and slaves. An additional example, the Twelve Tables are tied into the notion of Jus Commune, which translates as "common law", called "civil law" in some English-speaking countries. Some countries including South Africa and San Marino still base their current legal system on aspects of jus commune. In addition, law school students throughout the world are still required to study the Twelve Tables as well as other facets of Roman Law in order to better understand the current legal system in place.

== Ancient sources ==
The Twelve Tables are no longer extant: although they remained an important source throughout the Republic, they gradually became obsolete, eventually being only of historical interest. The original tablets may have been destroyed when the Gauls under Brennus burned Rome in 387 BC. Cicero claimed that he learned them by heart as a boy in school but that no one did so any longer. Since the early second century BC, Roman Republican scholars have written commentaries upon the Twelve Tables, such as Lucius Aelius Stilo, teacher of both Varro and Cicero.

=== Language ===
Parts of the text of the Twelve Tables were preserved in brief excerpts and quotations from the original laws by other ancient authors. All Roman sources quote the Twelve Tables in a modernised form of Latin. It is likely that the extant quotations in the text contain a multiplicity of layers of modernisation. It is believed that the process of this interlingual translation began at some point during the third or second century BC when the text of the Twelve Tables was no longer understandable in its entirety. As such, though it cannot be determined whether the quoted fragments accurately preserve the original form of Latin, what is present gives some insight into the grammar of early Latin.

Even in the updated form, certain Latin terms used in the Twelve Tables were difficult to understand in the late Roman Republic. For instance, when Cicero reports that Roman commentators did not understand a particular point in the Twelve Tables, we should expect that his example was not unique. According to Cicero, the law of the Twelve Tables introduced limits on the expense of funeral arrangements. One of those rules, Cicero explains, was subject to various interpretations because of the difficulty of understanding the archaic Latin term of lessus:

After limiting the expense, then, to three veils, a small purple tunic, and ten pipers, the law [of the Twelve Tables] goes on to do away with lamentation: ‘Women shall not scratch their cheeks or have a lessus on the occasion of a funeral’. The old interpreters, Sextus Aelius and Lucius Acilius, said they were not sure what this meant, but suspected it was some kind of funeral garment. Lucius Aelius takes lessus to be a mournful wailing, as the word itself suggests. I tend to believe this second explanation, since that is the very thing that Solon’s law forbids.

=== Form and structure ===
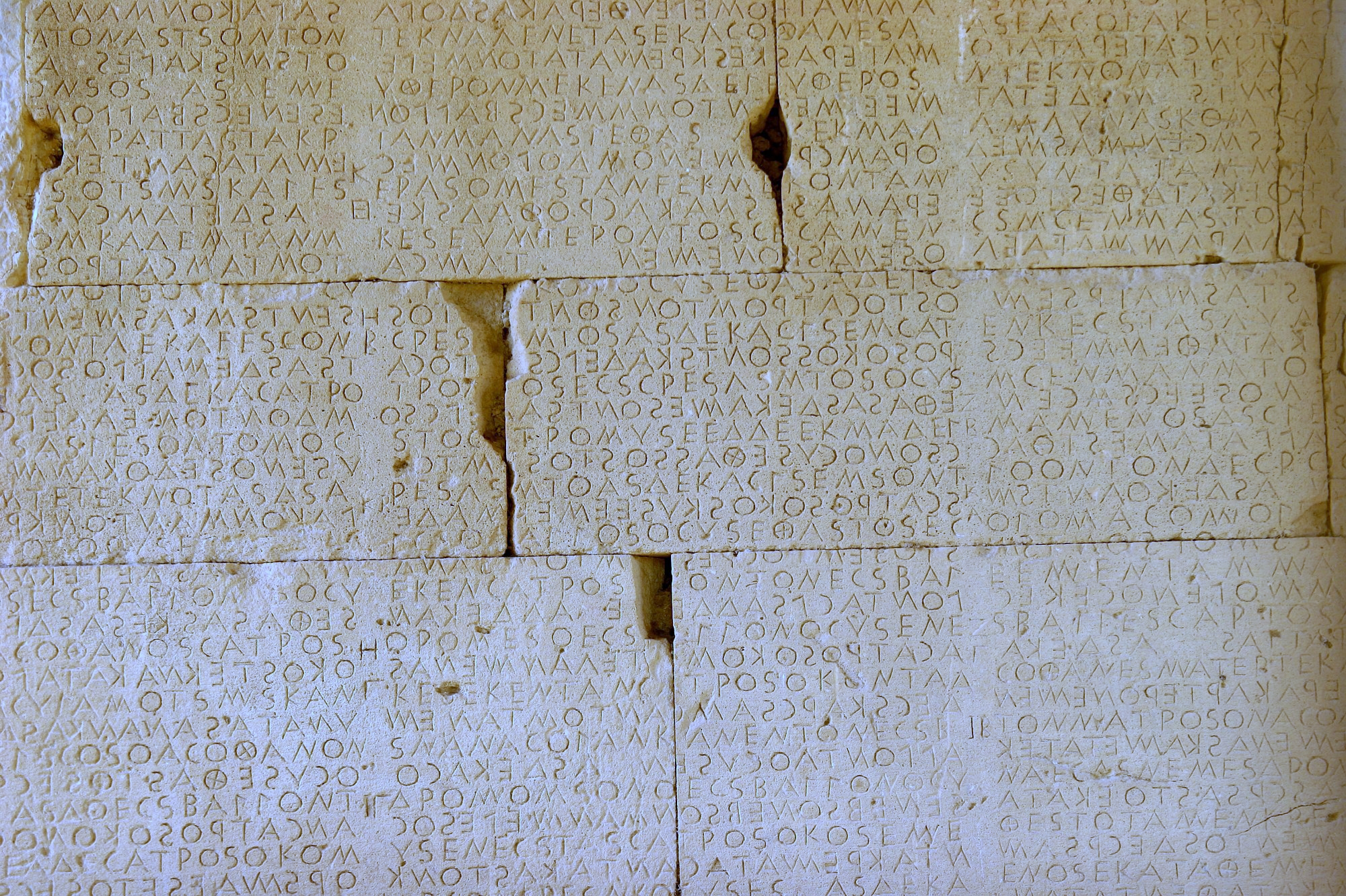
The fragment of lawcode of Gortyn in Crete (around 450 BC). This Greek lawcode was inscribed in twelve columns on the inner face of a circular wall. Scholars observed that its content and focus on the private law offers striking parallels with the Twelve Tables

According to ancient authors initially the Twelve Tables were recorded as an epigraphic text inscribed on twelve bronze tablets. It is believed that at some later stage the text of the Twelve Tables became a literary text. Some scholars suggest that the text at this time was rewritten and kept as a small ancient book. For instance, Cicero terms the laws "a single booklet" (unus libelus in Latin). In the ancient world, laws inscribed on bronze were often not easy to read but tended to serve a symbolic and religious purpose. It is likely that the law became a literary text at some point during the fourth century BC. It was the time when the Roman civil law began to be administered by curule magistrates. It is likely that state administrators would have found it more convenient to consult the law in book form. Therefore, it is likely that the twelve bronze tables would have become obsolete.

Like most other early codes of law, the Twelve Tables were largely procedural, combining strict and rigorous penalties with equally strict and rigorous procedural forms. In most of the surviving quotations from these texts, the original table that held them is not given. Scholars have guessed where the surviving fragments belong by comparing them with the few known attributions and records, many of which do not include the original lines, but paraphrases. It cannot be known with any certainty from what survives that the originals ever were organized this way, or even if they ever were organized by subject at all.

== Modern reconstructions ==
In Roman historical and legal sources, ancient writers referenced and discussed the laws of the Twelve Tables in numerous fragments. However, during the Early Middle Ages the knowledge of the Twelve Tables was lost. The reconstruction of the text started with the rediscovery of Corpus Iuris in the Late Middle Ages. The first attempt of the recovery of the laws was made by the French legal historian Aymar du Rivail in his Libri de Historia Juris Civilis et Pontificii (1515). His work was followed by more publications on the Twelve Tables by Alessandro Alessandri (1522) and Giovanni Tacuino (1525).

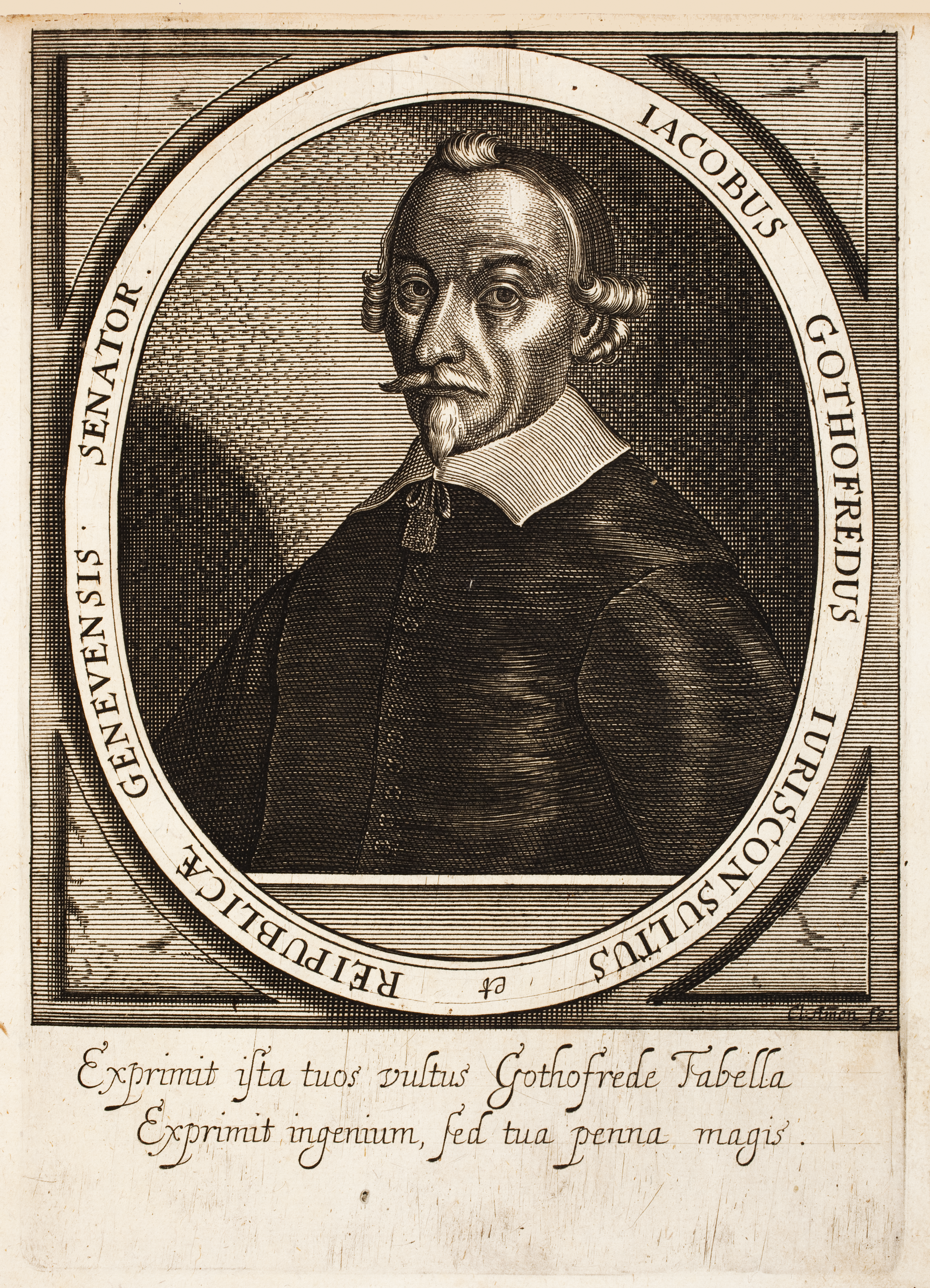
Jacques Godefroy

The fundamental work of the reconstruction of the Twelve Tables appeared in Jacques Godefroy's publication of the law of the Twelve Tables in 1616. Godefroy's reconstruction was based on the order of Gaius' Ad legem XII tabularum (On the Law of the Twelve Tables), compiled in the Digest, from which many of the provisions of the Twelve Tables came to us. Godefroy believed that Gaius in his work followed the original order of the Twelve Tables. Since Gaius' work was divided into six books, Godefroy assumed that each book covered two tables and that each table focused on a certain matter.

The most important modern reconstruction of the Twelve Tables was published by the German legal historian Heinrich Eduard Dirksen in his work of A Review of the attempts hitherto made at the criticism and restoration of the text of the fragments of the Twelve Tables (Leipzig, 1824). Dirksen's work, based on the principles and discoveries of Godefroy, is now considered to be the most authoritative reconstructions of the Twelve Tables. In 1866 Rudolf Schöll's reconstruction in Legis Duodecim Tabularum Reliquiae followed Dirksen's model. The first full English publication of the Dirksen's reconstruction was prepared and translated by Eric Herbert Warmington in the Remains of Old Latin, Volume III: Lucilius. The Twelve Tables in 1938 (No. 329 edition in the Loeb Classical Library).

In the last couple of decades, one of the most prominent reconstructions of the law of the Twelve Tables was Michael H. Crawford's work of Roman Statutes, vol. 2 (London, 1996). In this new version, Crawford and the team of specialists have reconsidered the conventional arrangement of the laws based on Dirksen and his followers. They concluded that this conventional grouping of the rules was wrong and offered their new arrangement. For instance, the laws relating to iniuria and furtum were moved from the eighth table (Tabula VIII) to the first table (Tabula I). Similarly, the law on conditionally freed slaves was moved from Tabula IV to Tabula VI.

=== List of modern reconstructions ===
- Godefroy, Jacques, 1616, Fragmenta XII. Tabularum, suis nunc primum tabulis restituta: probationibus, notis, & indice munita / Iacobo Gothofredo in Parlamento Parisiensi advocato auctore, Heidelbergae: Typis Johannis Lancelloti.
- Dirksen, Heinrich Eduard (1824). Uebersicht der bisherigen Versuche zur Kritik und Herstellung des Textes der Zwölf-Tafel-Fragmente. Leipzig: Duncker & Humblot.
- Schöll, Rudolf, 1868, Leges XII tabularum reliquiae, Leipzig, Duncker & Humblot.
- Voigt, Moritz, 1883, Die XII Tafeln: Geschichte und System des Civil-und Criminal-Rechtes, wie-Processes der XII Tafeln nebst deren Fragmenten, Leipzig: A.G. Liebeskind.
- Riccobono, Salvatore, 1941, Fontes iuris romani antejustiniani I, Florence, 21-75.
- Girard, Paul Frédéric et Senn, Félix, 1977, Les lois des Romains, septiéme édition par un groupe de romanistes, Paris and Naples: Jovene Editore, 25-73.
- Crawford, Michael H. (ed.), 1996, Roman Statutes, vol. 2, London: Institute of Classical Studies, 555-722.
- Flach, Dieter, 2004, Das Zwölftafelgesetz. Leges XII tabularum. Wissenschaftliche Buchgesellschaft, (Texte zur Forschung. Band 83), Darmstadt, ISBN 3-534-15983-7.

== Works cited ==
- Durant, W. (1942). The Story of Civilization. Simon and Schuster.
- Livy; De Sélincourt, A.; Ogilvie, R.M.; Oakley, S.P. (2002). The Early History of Rome: Books I–V of The History of Rome from its Foundations. Penguin Classics. ISBN 0-14-044809-8.
- Goodwin, Frederick (1886). The XII Tables. London: Stevens & Sons.
