= Roman–Aequian wars =

Series of wars between the ancient Romans and the Aequi

The Roman-Aequian wars were a series of wars during the early expansion of ancient Rome in central Italy fought against the Aequi, an Italic tribe located to their east.

Livy mentions that the last king of Rome, Tarquinius Superbus, made peace with the Aequi.

They fought several battles against the Romans including the battle of Mount Algidus (458 BC). Their chief center is said to have been taken by the Romans about 484 BC and again about ninety years later.

Records of fighting between Romans and Aequi become much sparser in the second half of the 5th century BC. Likely the Aequi had gradually become a more settled people and their raiding petered out as a result.

The Aequi were not finally subdued until the end of the second Samnite war, when they seem to have received a limited form of franchise.

== Aequi incursions in 494 BC ==
During the period of popular discontent in Rome which led to the First secessio plebis in 494 BC, the Volsci, Sabines, and Aequi each took up arms at the same time. In response, Manius Valerius Maximus was appointed as dictator. Ten legions were raised, a greater number than had been raised previously at any one time, three of which were assigned to the consul Veturius to deal with the Aequi.

The Aequi had invaded Latium, and Veturius marched there to meet the enemy at the request of the Latin allies of Rome, rather than allowing the Latins to arm themselves. Upon the arrival of the Roman army, the Aequians retreated from Latium to the safety of the mountains to the east.

Shortly afterwards, the Romans advanced into the mountains towards the Aequian camp. The Roman consul would have preferred to delay any attack, because the Aequian army's camp was situated on a position which was difficult to approach. However, the Roman troops demanded that there be no delay, because of their anxiety to return to Rome as soon as possible because of the political events that had been fomenting there. Therefore, the Roman army advanced up the hill towards the Aequian camp. The Aequi, however, were so stunned at the Romans' boldness that they abandoned their camp and fled. The Roman army captured the Aequian camp, and took from it an abundance of booty, thereby securing a bloodless victory.

== Attack on Rome in 488 BC ==
In 488 BC the Volsci, led by Gaius Marcius Coriolanus and Attius Tullus Aufidius, laid siege to Rome. Coriolanus, a native of Rome, relented and broke off the siege. The Volsci eventually returned to attack Rome, and were joined by an army of the Aequi. However, the Aequi refused to accept the leadership of Aufidius, and as a result a dispute broke out and the two armies fought, diminishing the strength of each of them such that they were no longer a threat to Rome.

== Ongoing hostilities from 485 BC ==
The Volsci and the Aequi were together defeated again in 485 BC. The consul Quintus Fabius Vibulanus incurred the anger of the plebs by lodging the spoils of victory with the publicum.

Hostilities with the Volsci and Aequi were renewed in 484 BC. The Romans, led by the consul Lucius Aemilius Mamercus, defeated the enemy, and the Roman cavalry slaughtered many in the rout which followed.

The Aequi took up arms again in 482 BC. In 481 BC they laid siege to the Latin town of Ortona, and the Romans raised an army and placed it under the command of the consul Kaeso Fabius. The Romans met the Aequi in battle, and routed them solely by a cavalry charge. Due to popular discontent amongst the Roman army, both with the patricians and with Fabius himself, the Roman infantry refused to pursue the enemy. Fabius exhorted them to attack the fleeing enemy, but they refused, and returned to camp. Nevertheless Fabius and the army returned to Rome victorious.

In 479 BC Kaeso Fabius was again consul. The Aequi invaded Latin territory, and Fabius was assigned an army to deal with the threat. No significant battle was fought, because the Aequi retreated to their walled towns. When word arrived that the other consul Titus Verginius Tricostus Rutilus was threatened by the Veientes, Fabius took his army to rescue his colleague.

In 475 BC the Aequi together with the Volsci invaded the Latin territory. The Latins, joined by the Hernici but without the assistance of any Roman troops or Roman commander, repelled the enemy and captured a significant amount of booty.

In 471 BC the Aequi again invaded, as did the Volsci. The consul Titus Quinctius Capitolinus Barbatus was given command of the Roman forces against the Aequi. He successfully ravaged the enemy territory. In contrast to his colleague Claudius who had offended the plebeians and therefore lost the discipline of his troops, Quinctius suffered no military ill-discipline. Indeed his troops returned to Rome with praises for Quinctius, calling him their 'parent'.

In the following year the Roman consul Lucius Valerius Potitus again led Roman troops into Aequian territory. He unsuccessfully attempted to assault the Aequian army camp, and instead ravaged the Aequian territory.

Three years later in 467 BC, the Roman consul Quintus Fabius Vibulanus was sent into the Aequian territory with a Roman army. The Aequi sued for peace, and peace was agreed. However the Aequi broke the peace shortly after by a raid into Latin territory. In 466 BC the consul Quintus Servilius Priscus Structus led a Roman army into Aequian territory to continue the war. However an illness through the Roman camp prevented any military engagement.

In 465 BC Quintus Fabius Vibulanus, Roman consul for the second time, was given a special command against the Aequi. He sought to persuade the Aequi to make peace, however the Aequi rejected that offer, and marched to Algidum. The Romans were so offended by the Aequian behaviour that the second consul, Titus Quinctius Capitolinus Barbatus, was sent with another Roman army against the Aequi. A battle was fought and the Romans were successful, following which the Aequi retreated to their own territory.

However the Aequi immediately returned to Latium and began pillaging the countryside. News of this fresh attack, at a time when both consuls were still absent from the city, caused panic in Rome. The consul Quinctius returned to the city, and to calm the populace he declared the justitium and appointed Quintus Servilius Priscus Structus as praefectus urbi during the consuls' absence. Quinctius and his army then left Rome again, but were unable to locate the enemy to engage in battle. He returned to Rome four days later and declared the justitium concluded. Meanwhile the other consul Fabius successfully ambushed the Aequi and routed them, recovering all the bounty that had been taken from Latin territory. He then pursued the Aequi into their own territory and ravaged their lands, later returning to Rome with much bounty and glory.

Hostilities continued in 464 BC. The Aequi allied with the Volscian town of Ecetra (already under Roman rule) against Rome. The Hernici learnt of this alliance, and warned Rome that the Ecetrans had revolted. The Romans also suspected that the Volscian town of Antium (which included a Roman colony) would also revolt. This suspicion arose because Antium had been defeated by Rome in 468 BC, and many of the chief opponents of Rome from Antium had fled to the Aequi, and had fought with the Aequi against Rome, and had subsequently returned to Antium. The Roman consuls Aulus Postumius Albus Regillensis and Spurius Furius Medullinus Fusus summoned the chief men of Antium to Rome to explain their position, but they attended without reluctance and answered sufficiently that they were allowed return to Antium.

The Aequi invaded the Hernican territory, and the Roman consul Furius marched against them. In an initial battle the Aequi were victorious, and the Roman forces were besieged in their camp. The Hernici sent news of the defeat to Rome, and the senate declared the emergency decree, the senatus consultum ultimum (the first recorded occasion of that decree), urging the remaining consul Postumius to take all measures to protect the state. Postumius remained at Rome to levy troops and Titus Quinctius, consul the previous year, was granted command of fresh Roman forces as proconsul. The Latin allies, the Hernici, and Antium, were each ordered to provide emergency troops.

Aequian forces were sent to invade Roman territory, and if possible to attack the city. The remaining consul Postumius was sent to meet this new threat and Lucius Valerius, the consul of 470 BC, was left to defend Rome. A justitium was declared for several days.

Meanwhile the Roman forces led by the consul Furius burst forth from their besieged camp and attacked the Aequi. The Roman attack initially succeeded, however the consul's brother Publius, (who had been consul in 472 BC and was serving as a legatus under his brother's command) led his forces too far from the main Roman force, and was cut off and killed. This led the consul to pursue him, and he was himself wounded and only just rescued from the enemy. The Aequi besieged the Romans in their camp once again, and displayed the head of the consul's brother. But then the proconsul Quinctius arrived with Latin and Hernican forces, and attacked the Aequian army. The besieged Roman army again broke forth from the camp, and the Aequian army was soundly defeated.

Postumius was also successful against the Aequian forces in Roman territory, and he was joined in the attack by the returning Roman armies of Quinctius and Furius. Livy, relying on Valerius Antias, gives the number of Romans dead in Hernican territory as 5,300, and 2,400 Aequi killed in Roman territory plus a further 4,230 Aequians killed fleeing with booty.

The Roman forces returned to Rome. The justitium was ended. The Latin and Hernican troops were returned with much thanks. A force of 1,000 from Antium arrived too late to give assistance and were dismissed. A number of portents were witnessed in Rome at the conclusion of this war, and a solemn festival of three days was declared to appease the gods.

== Aequi uprising in 388 BC ==
In 390 BC a Gaulish war band defeated the Roman army at the Battle of Allia and then sacked Rome. The ancient writers report that in 389 BC the Etruscans, the Volsci, and the Aequi all raised armies in hope of exploiting this blow to Roman power. According to Livy and Plutarch, the Aequi gathered their army at Bolae. However, the Roman dictator, Marcus Furius Camillus, had just inflicted a severe defeat on the Volsci. He surprised the Aequian army and captured both their camp and the town. According to Diodorus Siculus, the Aequi were actually besieging Bolae when they were attacked by Camillus. According to Livy, a Roman army ravaged Aequian territory again in 388, this time meeting no resistance. Oakley (1997) considers these notices of Roman victories against the Aequi in 389 and 388 to be historical, confirmed by the disappearance of the Aequi from the sources until 304. Owing to the dispute in the sources, however, the precise nature of the fighting around Bolae cannot be determined. Bolae was a Latin town, but it was also the scene of much fighting between Romans and Aequi, and it changed hands several times. Either an (unreported) Aequian capture followed by Roman recapture, or a failed Aequan siege, are therefore possible.
