= 481 BC =

481 BC in various calendars
- Gregorian calendar: 481 BC; CDLXXXI BC
- Ab urbe condita: 273
- Ancient Egypt era: XXVII dynasty, 45
- Pharaoh: Xerxes I of Persia, 5
- Ancient Greek Olympiad (summer): 74th Olympiad, year 4
- Assyrian calendar: 4270
- Balinese saka calendar: N/A
- Bengali calendar: −1074 – −1073
- Berber calendar: 470
- Buddhist calendar: 64
- Burmese calendar: −1118
- Byzantine calendar: 5028–5029
- Chinese calendar: 己未年 (Earth Goat); 2217 or 2010 — to — 庚申年 (Metal Monkey); 2218 or 2011
- Coptic calendar: −764 – −763
- Discordian calendar: 686
- Ethiopian calendar: −488 – −487
- Hebrew calendar: 3280–3281
- Hindu calendars
- Vikram Samvat: −424 – −423
- Shaka Samvat: N/A
- Kali Yuga: 2620–2621
- Holocene calendar: 9520
- Iranian calendar: 1102 BP – 1101 BP
- Islamic calendar: 1136 BH – 1135 BH
- Javanese calendar: N/A
- Julian calendar: N/A
- Korean calendar: 1853
- Minguo calendar: 2392 before ROC 民前2392年
- Nanakshahi calendar: −1948
- Thai solar calendar: 62–63
- Tibetan calendar: ས་མོ་ལུག་ལོ་ (female Earth-Sheep) −354 or −735 or −1507 — to — ལྕགས་ཕོ་སྤྲེ་ལོ་ (male Iron-Monkey) −353 or −734 or −1506

Year 481 BC was a year of the pre-Julian Roman calendar. At the time, it was known as the Year of the Consulship of Vibulanus and Fusus (or, less frequently, year 273 Ab urbe condita). The denomination 481 BC for this year has been used since the early medieval period, when the Anno Domini calendar era became the prevalent method in Europe for naming years.

== Events ==
=== By place ===
==== Persian Empire ====
- The Persian King Xerxes I arrives at Sardis and begins to build up his great army and navy for the invasion of Greece. Egypt contributes 481 ships.

==== Greece ====
- The Congress at the Isthmus of Corinth, under the presidency of Sparta, brings together a number of the Greek city states, who agree to the end of the war between Athens and Aegina. They also discuss the threat from the Persians. Athens is unwilling to place her forces under Sparta and its king Leonidas. Gelo, tyrant of Syracuse, wants high command, but Sparta and Athens refuse. However, during the Congress, Gelo has to withdraw due to Carthage's plans to invade Sicily. Finally, Themistocles agrees that Athens' navy serve under a Spartan admiral to achieve the unity of the Greek states. Nevertheless, Thebes and Thessaly are unwilling to support Athens against the Persians and Crete decides to remain neutral.

==== China ====
- The Spring and Autumn period, which had begun in 722 BC, ends and compilation of the Spring and Autumn Annals ceases. It gives way to the Warring States period.

==== Rome ====
- The Aequi lay siege to Ortona but are defeated by the Romans. Tensions between the Roman classes flare during the battle.
- Continuation of hostilities with Veii. The Veientine army threatens to besiege Rome but nothing notable occurs.
- The tribune Spurius Licinius unsuccessfully advocates an agrarian law.

== Births ==
- Protagoras, Greek presocratic philosopher (d. c. 420 BC)

== Deaths ==
- Sima Niu, the highest ranking aristocrat among the disciples of Confucius
