= Quintus Fabius Vibulanus (consul 467 BC) =

Roman senator and consul

Quintus Fabius Vibulanus, son of Marcus Fabius Vibulanus (consul 483 BC), was consul of the Roman Republic and one of the second set of decemviri.

== Biography ==
According to Livy, Quintus was the only male to escape the slaughter of the gens Fabia at the Battle of the Cremera in 477 BC, since he was too young to be sent to war.

He was consul of the Roman Republic three times:

1. 467 BC, with Tiberius Aemilius Mamercinus
2. 465 BC, with Titus Quinctius Capitolinus Barbatus
3. 459 BC, with Lucius Cornelius Maluginensis Uritinus

In his first consulship there was popular agitation for an agrarian law, which had been the cause of much social conflict at Rome for many years. Fabius successfully brought an end to the conflict by passing a law that the lands of the Volsci at the new Roman colony of Antium be distributed amongst the plebs. Three commissioners were named for the purpose of dividing the lands Titus Quintius, Aulus Verginius, and Publius Furius.

Also in 467 BC, Fabius led a Roman army against the Aequi. The Aequi sued for peace, which was granted, however the Aequi broke the peace shortly after with a raid into the Latin territory. The following year Fabius was sent by the senate to demand restitution from the Aequi.

In his second consulship in 465 BC Fabius was given a special command against the Aequi. He sought to persuade the Aequi to make peace, however the Aequi rejected that offer, and marched to Algidum. The Romans were so offended by the Aequian behaviour that the second consul Quinctius was sent with another Roman army against the Aequi. A battle was fought and the Romans were successful, following which the Aequi retreated to their own territory.

However the Aequi immediately returned to Latium and began pillaging the countryside. Fabius successfully ambushed the Aequi and routed them, recovering all the bounty that had been taken from the Latin territory. He then pursued the Aequi into their own territory and ravaged their lands, later returning to Rome with much bounty and glory.

The war would continue with the Aequi and in 462 BC, when both consuls were occupied with fighting both the Aequi and Volscians, Fabius was appointed as Praefectus urbi and given command in Rome.

During his third consulate, he besieged Antium and helped the Tusculans to rescue their city, which was occupied by the Aequi. In the end, he attacked the Aequi fleeing from Tusculum, killing many of them near Mount Algidus.

In the following year, 458 BC, he was one of three ambassadors sent by the senate to demand recompense from the Aequi for the breaking of a treaty. Later in the year, during the dictatorship of Cincinnatus, Fabius was again appointed Praefectus urbi and held command in Rome.

In 450 BC, Appius Claudius named him one of the second set of decemviri, ten men given absolute authority in Rome while they compiled the Law of the Twelve Tables. Livy says that Fabius was easily corrupted by Appius and he went from being a very good man to a very wicked one.

== See also ==
- Fabia gens

Political offices
Preceded by Titus Quinctius II; Quintus Servilius	Roman consul 467 BC; With: Tiberius Aemilius Mamercinus	Succeeded by Quintus Servilius II; Spurius Postumius
Preceded by Quintus Servilius II; Spurius Postumius	Roman consul 465 BC; With: Titus Quinctius III	Succeeded by Aulus Postumius; Spurius Furius
Preceded by Gaius Claudius; Publius Valerius II	Roman consul 459 BC; With: Lucius Cornelius Maluginensis Uritinus	Succeeded by Lucius Minucius; Gaius Nautius II
