= Canuleia =

Canuleia may refer to:

- Canuleia gens, an ancient Roman family
- lex Canuleia, a law of Ancient Rome
  - Gaius Canuleius, who proposed the law
- Canuleia (priestess), a Vestal Virgin
- Libythea narina canuleia, a subspecies of butterfly of the species Libythea narina
- Canuleia (crater), a crater on 4 Vesta, see List of geological features on Vesta
