= 479 BC =

479 BC in various calendars
- Gregorian calendar: 479 BC; CDLXXIX BC
- Ab urbe condita: 275
- Ancient Egypt era: XXVII dynasty, 47
- Pharaoh: Xerxes I of Persia, 7
- Ancient Greek Olympiad (summer): 75th Olympiad, year 2
- Assyrian calendar: 4272
- Balinese saka calendar: N/A
- Bengali calendar: −1072 – −1071
- Berber calendar: 472
- Buddhist calendar: 66
- Burmese calendar: −1116
- Byzantine calendar: 5030–5031
- Chinese calendar: 辛酉年 (Metal Rooster); 2219 or 2012 — to — 壬戌年 (Water Dog); 2220 or 2013
- Coptic calendar: −762 – −761
- Discordian calendar: 688
- Ethiopian calendar: −486 – −485
- Hebrew calendar: 3282–3283
- Hindu calendars
- Vikram Samvat: −422 – −421
- Shaka Samvat: N/A
- Kali Yuga: 2622–2623
- Holocene calendar: 9522
- Iranian calendar: 1100 BP – 1099 BP
- Islamic calendar: 1134 BH – 1133 BH
- Javanese calendar: N/A
- Julian calendar: N/A
- Korean calendar: 1855
- Minguo calendar: 2390 before ROC 民前2390年
- Nanakshahi calendar: −1946
- Thai solar calendar: 64–65
- Tibetan calendar: ལྕགས་མོ་བྱ་ལོ་ (female Iron-Bird) −352 or −733 or −1505 — to — ཆུ་ཕོ་ཁྱི་ལོ་ (male Water-Dog) −351 or −732 or −1504

{dynamic list}}

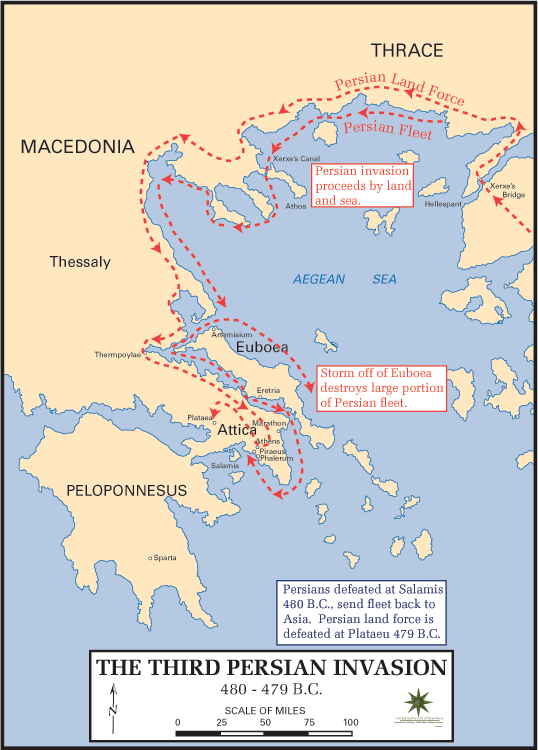
The Persian invasion of Greece in 480–479 BC

Year 479 BC was a year of the pre-Julian Roman calendar. At the time, it was known as the Year of the Consulship of Vibulanus and Rutilus (or, less frequently, year 275 Ab urbe condita). The denomination 479 BC for this year has been used since the early medieval period, when the Anno Domini calendar era became the prevalent method in Europe for naming years.

== Events ==
=== By place ===
==== Greece ====
- The Persian commander Mardonius, now based in Thessaly, wins support from Argus and western Arcadia. He tries to win over Athens, but fails.
- Mardonius attacks Athens once more and the Athenians are forced to retreat, whereupon he razes the city. The Spartans march north to support Athens against the Persians.
- August 27
  - The Battle of Plataea in Boeotia ends the Persian invasions of Greece as the Persian general Mardonius is routed by the Greeks under Pausanias, nephew of the former Spartan King, Leonidas I. The Athenian contingent is led by the repatriated Aristides. Mardonius is killed in the battle and the Greeks capture enormous amounts of loot. Thebes is captured shortly thereafter and the Theban collaborators executed by Pausanias.
  - Meanwhile at sea, the Persians are defeated by a Greek fleet headed by Leotychidas of Sparta and Xanthippus of Athens in the Battle of Mycale, on the coast of Ionia in Asia Minor.
- Potidaea is struck by a tsunami.
- In 479 BC, when Persian soldiers besieged the Greek city of Potidaea, the tide retreated much further than usual, leaving a convenient invasion route, but this was not a stroke of luck. Before they had crossed halfway, the water returned in a wave higher than anyone had ever seen, drowning the attackers. The Potiidaeans believed they had been saved by the wrath of Poseidon, but what really saved them was likely the same phenomenon that has destroyed countless others: a tsunami.

==== Rome ====
- The Roman consul Caeso Fabius proposed an agrarian law to distribute land won in recent wars amongst the plebs, but this was rejected by the senate.
- Ongoing hostilities between Rome and the Aequi. No major battle is fought.
- Ongoing hostilities between Rome and Veii. The family of the Fabii requests and is granted sole responsibility for the war, and the Fabii march from Rome, establishing a fortified camp at the Cremera.

== Deaths ==
- August 27: Mardonius, Persian general (killed in the Battle of Plataea)
- Confucius, Chinese philosopher (b. 551 BC)
