= Agrarian law =

Ancient Roman land laws

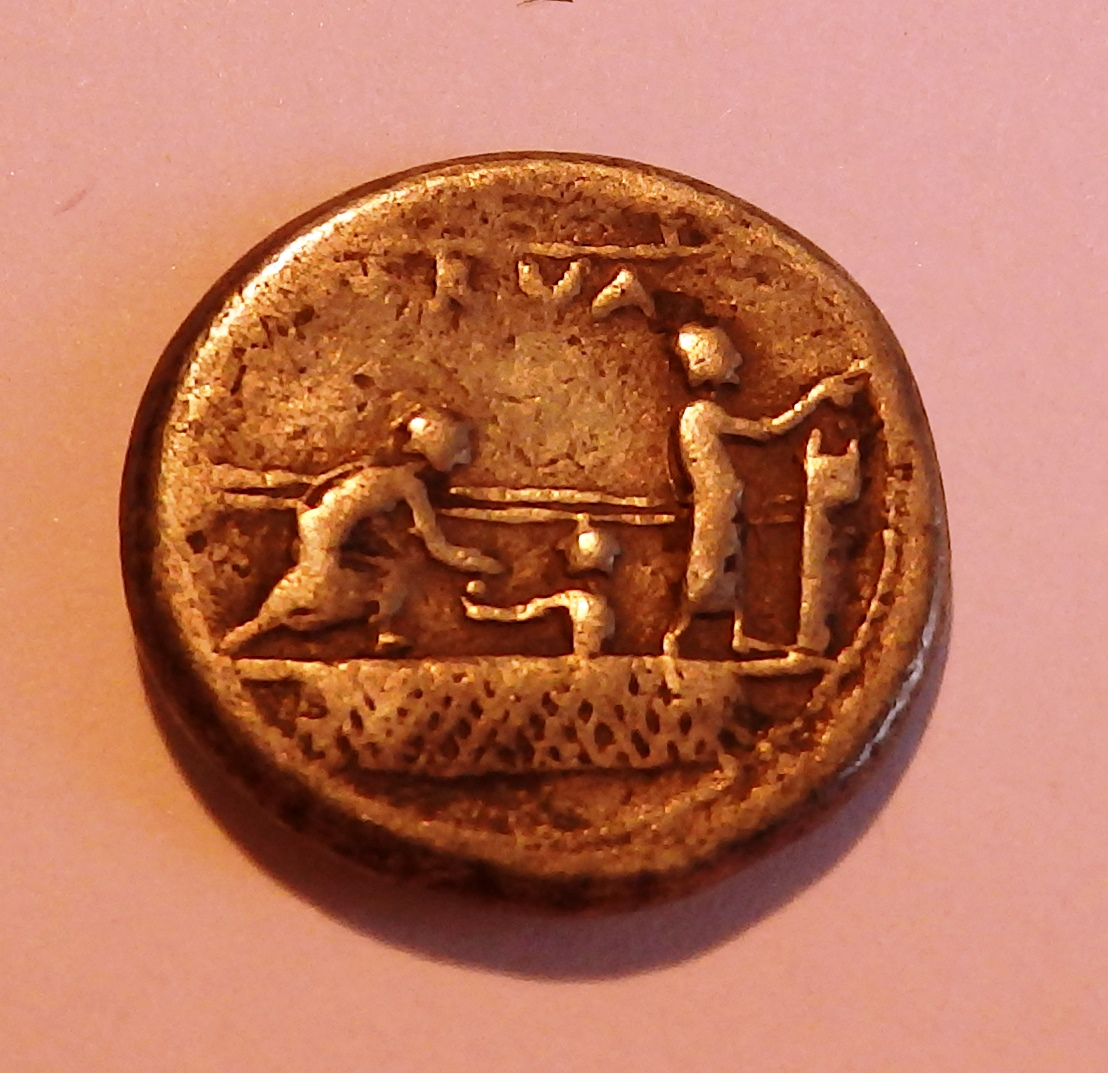
Roman Denarius from 113/112 b.c. showing the referendum on the lex agraria of 111 b.c., Albert 1075

Agrarian laws (from the Latin ager, meaning "land") were laws among the Romans regulating the division of the public lands, or ager publicus. In its broader definition, it can also refer to the agricultural laws relating to peasants and husbandmen, or to the general farming class of people of any society.

Various attempts to reform agrarian laws were part of the socio-political struggle between the patricians and plebeians known as the Conflict of the Orders.

In other countries like Germany and the Netherlands, agrarian law is the name used to describe the terrain of law relating to farming and agriculture.

== Introduction ==
There existed two kinds of land in ancient Rome: private and public land (ager publicus), which included common pasture. By the 2nd century BC, wealthy landowners had begun to dominate the agrarian areas of the republic by "renting" large tracts of public land and treating it as if it were private. This began to force out smaller, private farmers with competition; the farmers were forced to move to the cities for this and a number of other factors including battles making living in rural areas dangerous. Roman cities were not good places to attempt to get jobs; they were also dangerous, overcrowded and messy.

== Proposed land distribution in 486 BC ==
Probably the earliest attempt at an agrarian law was in 486 BC. A peace treaty was entered into with the Hernici whereby they agreed to cede two-thirds of their land. Spurius Cassius Vecellinus, Roman consul for the third time, proposed to distribute that land, together with other public Roman land, amongst the Latin allies and the plebs. Cassius proposed a law to give effect to his proposal. Niebuhr suggests that the law sought to restore the law of Servius Tullius, the sixth King of Rome, strictly defining the portion of the patricians in the public land, dividing the remainder amongst the plebeians, and requiring that the tithe be levied from the lands possessed by the patricians.

The proposed law was opposed by the senators (some of whom it seemed were squatting on the public Roman land) and by the other consul Proculus Verginius Tricostus Rutilus. Their opposition to the law was also based on their concerns that Cassius was seeking to gain too much popularity.

Verginius spoke publicly against the law, and the plebs became concerned that land was being given to the Latin allies, and also that Cassius might be seeking to pave the way to regal power. Verginius even suggested he would support the law if it was in favour only of Romans and not Rome's allies. To counter him, Cassius promised that the money raised from the Sicilian corn distribution be donated to the plebs, but they rejected this as a political bribe, and suspicion that Cassius was seeking regal power increased.

In 485 BC once Cassius had left office he was condemned and executed. Livy says that the method of his trial is uncertain. Livy's preferred version is that a public trial on the charge of high treason was held on the orders of the quaestores parricidii Caeso Fabius and Lucius Valerius, at which Cassius was condemned by the people, and subsequently by public decree his house was demolished (being near the temple of Tellus). The alternative version is that Cassius' own father conducted a private trial (presumably exercising authority as pater familias, although Niebuhr argues that it was impossible that a man who had been thrice consul and twice triumphed should still be in his father's power.) and put his son to death, and subsequently dedicated his son's assets to the goddess Ceres, including by dedicating a statue to her with the inscription ""given from the Cassian family". Dionysius states that he was hurled from the Tarpeian Rock.

Some seem to have called for the execution of Cassius' sons also, but according to Dionysius, they were spared by the senate.

Cassius Dio expressed his belief in the consul's innocence.

In 159 BC the statue of Cassius erected on the spot of his house was melted down by the censors.

== Land distribution in 467 BC ==
Popular agitation for agrarian reform continued during 484 BC. And again in 481 and 480 BC, when the tribunes Spurius Licinius and Titus Pontificius respectively exhorted the plebs to refuse enrolment for military service as a means of encouraging agrarian reform, but the consuls and the other tribunes convinced the plebs otherwise.

In 476 BC the tribunes Quintus Considius and Titus Genucius successfully brought charges against Titus Menenius Lanatus, and in the following year the tribunes Lucius Caedicius and Titus Statius brought charges against Spurius Servilius but he was acquitted. Livy says the charges were motivated by agitation for agrarian reform.

In 473 BC, the tribune Gnaeus Genucius brought to trial the consuls of the previous year, Lucius Furius Medullinus and Gnaeus Manlius Vulso, for failing to appoint the decemvirs to allocate the public lands. However, on the day of the trial Genucius was found dead, and as a consequence the charges were dismissed.

In 470 BC the tribunes Marcus Duilius and Gnaeus Siccius brought to trial the consul of the previous year, Appius Claudius, a man who was hated by the people. The charge was that he had opposed the agrarian law. However he died before the trial.

In 469 BC tensions on account of the agrarian law threatened again, but foreign wars interrupted.

Tensions flared after the conclusion of the foreign conflicts, and as a consequence the plebeians refused to attend the consular elections for 468 BC. Once again conflict at Rome was interrupted by foreign war, which resulted in the consul Titus Quinctius Capitolinus Barbatus capturing the Volscian city of Antium south of Rome.

In 467 BC Tiberius Aemilius was elected consult for the second time, together with Quintus Fabius Vibulanus. Aemilius had previously been consul in 470 BC at the time of Claudius' trial, and had then been sympathetic to the plebeians' agrarian demands. According the plebeians sought to raise the issue again, hoping Aemilius would act in their interests. Indeed, Aemilius was in favour of agrarian reform again, and thus incurred the odium of the patricians. However the tensions were resolved by Aemilius' colleague Fabius, who proposed a law that a Roman colony be planted at Antium, and land there be distributed amongst the plebeians. The measure was passed, and three men were appointed as commissioners to allocate the lands (triumviri coloniae deducendae). They were Titus Quinctius, the consul of the previous year who had captured Antium from the Volsci; Aulus Verginius Tricostus Caeliomontanus the consul of 469 BC; and Publius Furius Medullinus Fusus the consul of 472 BC. Livy reports that in fact few of the plebeians applied for allotment of land at Antium, however reports of conflict on account of the agrarian reforms were absent for many years thereafter.

== Gracchan reforms in late 2nd century BC ==
In 133 BC, Tiberius Gracchus, the tribune of the plebs, passed a series of laws attempting to reform the agrarian land laws; the laws limited the amount of public land one person could control, reclaimed public lands held in excess of this, and attempted to redistribute the land, for a small rent, to farmers now living in the cities.

Further reforms in 122 BC were attempted by Tiberius's brother, Gaius Gracchus, including the expansion of the laws' area of influence to all of the colonies in Italy. These reforms, however, were not as successful due to massive unpopularity in the Italian provinces.

By 118 BC the sales limits and redistribution efforts had been abolished, and by 111 BC the laws were standardized, confirming the positions of many owners in Italy about their large tracts of land.

== See also ==
- Agrarian reform
- Latifundium
