= Spurius Furius Medullinus Fusus =

Spurius Furius Medullinus Fusus may refer to:

- Spurius Furius Medullinus Fusus, consul in 481 BC.
- Spurius Furius Medullinus Fusus, brother of Publius Furius Medullinus Fusus (consul in 472 BC) and father of Lucius Furius Medullinus (military tribune with consular power in 432, 425, and 420 BC).
