= Agrippa Furius Fusus =

Roman consul in 446 BC

Consul of the Roman Republic
- In office 13 December 446 BC – 12 December 445 BC Serving with Titus Quinctius Capitolinus Barbatus
- Preceded by: Marcus Geganius Macerinus, Gaius Julius Iulus (consul 447 BC)
- Succeeded by: Marcus Genucius Augurinus, Gaius Curtius Philo

Personal details
- Born: Unknown Ancient Rome
- Died: Unknown Ancient Rome

Agrippa Furius Fusus was a Roman statesman who served as Consul in 446 BC.

== Consulship ==
After the fall of the Second Decemvirate, internal sedition broke out again. The Aequi and Volsci, taking advantage once more of the instability of the Roman political situation, ravaged Latium unopposed. Titus Quinctius, Fusus' co-consul, addressed the people, noting the critical discord between the patricians and the plebeians, and the fact that the people refuse to take up arms when the enemy was at the gates, preferring instead to attack the patricians. His speech had quite an effect on the people. The two consuls were then able to gather an army as the people were willing to be mobilized to fight the invaders. Agrippa Furius Fusus handed over the supreme command to Titus Quinctius, only keeping command of a part of the army. The Roman army managed to repulse the invading Aequi and Volscians, and then took the enemy camp and gathered a large booty, part of which was the result of the Aequi and Volscians' earlier looting of Latium.

During the same year, the consuls were retained by the inhabitants of two Latin cities, Ardea and Aricia, to mediate a territorial dispute.

== See also ==
- Furia (gens)

Political offices
Preceded by Marcus Geganius Macerinus; Gaius Julius Iulus	Consul of the Roman Republic with Titus Quinctius Capitolinus Barbatus IV; 446 BC	Succeeded by Marcus Genucius Augurinus; Gaius Curtius Philo
