= Battle of Corbio =

Roman victory over the Aequi and Volsci tribes (446 BC)

Coordinates: 41.777°N 12.9176°E

The Battle of Corbio took place in 446 BC. General Titus Quinctius Capitolinus Barbatus and legatus Spurius Postumius Albus Regillensis led Roman troops to a victory over the Aequi tribes of north-east Latium and the Volsci tribes of southern Latium at the town of Corbio. The Romans had already defeated the Aequi in the Battle of Mount Algidus, so that the Battle of Corbio definitely marked the dominion of the Romans over this tribe.

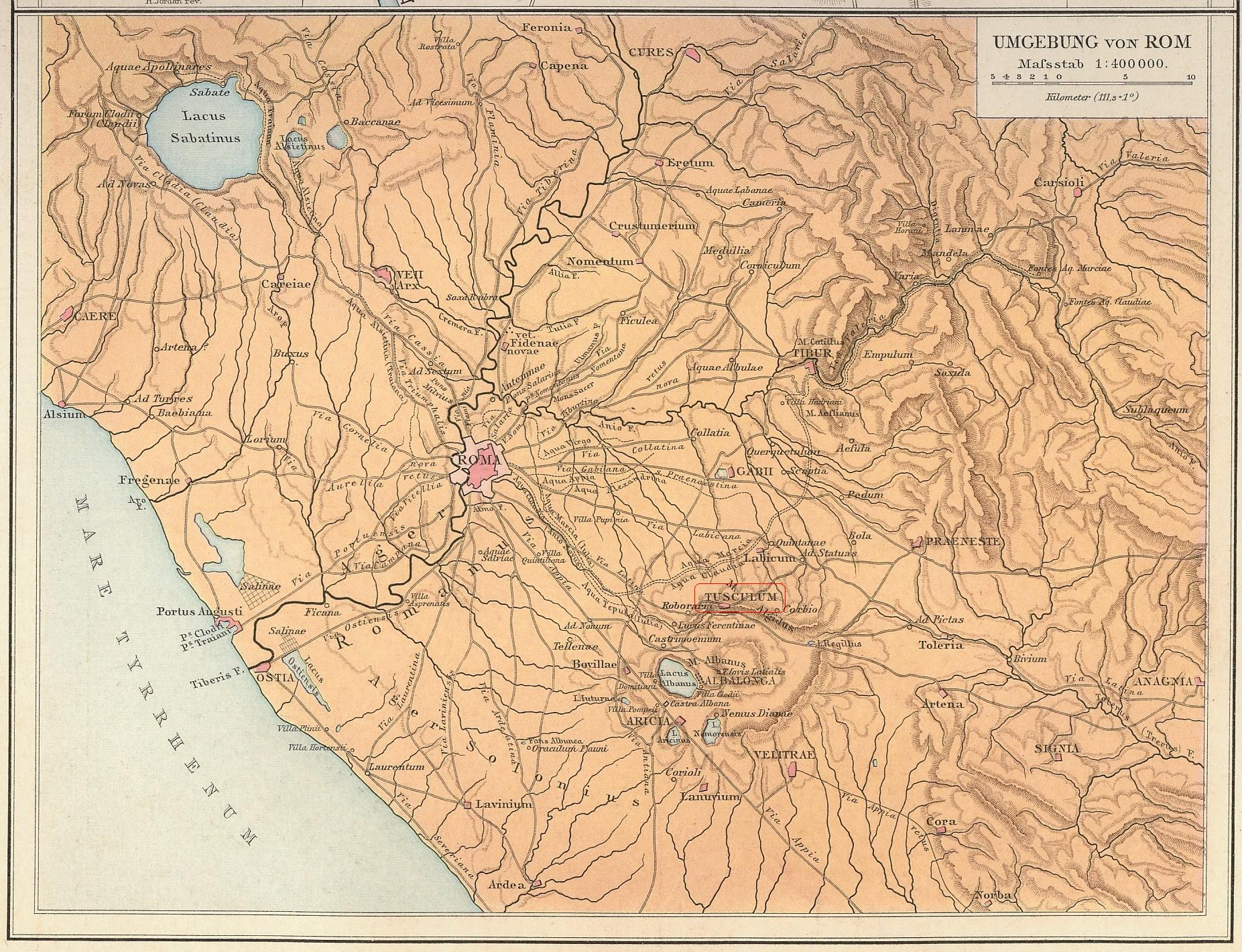
Surroundings of Rome in Antiquity

After an unsuccessful attack by the consul Spurius Furius Medullinus Fusus (consul 464 BC), Quinctius was given consular powers by the Senate so that he could defeat the enemy army which was besieging Furius. The enemy army outnumbered the Romans, so one part of their army attacked Furius' camp while the other part devastated Roman territory.

A few days into the siege, Furius successfully surprised the enemy but decided not to pursue them because he thought the camp would be vulnerable if he did. Furius' brother was surrounded by the enemy during the fight. The consul tried to rescue him, but was wounded. His brother was killed, which greatly lowered Roman morale.

While the Aequi were focused on the Roman camp, Quinctius attacked them from the rear and Furius attacked them from the front. A large part of their army was surrounded, so the Aequi retreated. The exact casualties are unknown, but the Roman casualties were at least 6,000 men. The Aequi didn't take major casualties during this battle, though many were killed in engagements after this battle.
