= Quintus Servilius Priscus (consul 468 BC) =

5th-century BC Roman senator, consul and general

- Years active: fl. c. 468–459 BC
- Office: Consul (468, 466 BC)

Quintus Servilius Priscus (fl. c. 468–459 BC) was a Roman statesman who served as Consul in 468 BC and 466 BC.

== Career ==
In 468 BC, he became consul alongside Titus Quinctius Capitolinus Barbatus. He was elected by the patricians only, as plebeians refused to vote. During the year, he was given command of Roman forced against the Sabines who have ravaged Latium and the Roman lands. He in turn ravaged the Sabine territory, and recovered a greater amount of booty than the Sabines had. There was no major engagement with the Sabines, although the war with them which had been ongoing since 470 BC seems to have abated at this time.

In 466 BC, he became consul for the second time with Spurius Postumius Albus Regillensis. He led a Roman army into the Aequian territory to continue a war against them. However an illness through the Roman camp prevented any military engagement.

In 465 BC Servilius was appointed Praefectus urbi during a justitium when both consuls were to be absent from Rome dealing with the ongoing military threat from the Aequi.

He was elected quaestor in 459 BC and attempted to prosecute the tribune of the plebs, Marcus Volscius Fictor, for giving false witness against Caeso Quinctius. His colleague in the quaestorship was the otherwise unknown Aulus Cornelius. The trial against Volscius was continued by the quaestors of the following year.

== See also ==
- Servilia gens

== Footnotes ==
Political offices
Preceded by Titus Numicius Priscus; A. Verginius Tricostus Caeliomontanus	Roman consul 468 BC; With: Titus Quinctius Capitolinus Barbatus	Succeeded by Tiberius Aemilius Mamercinus II; Quintus Fabius Vibulanus
Preceded by Tiberius Aemilius Mamercinus II; Quintus Fabius Vibulanus	Roman consul 466 BC; With: Spurius Postumius Albus Regillensis	Succeeded by Quintus Fabius Vibulanus II; Titus Quinctius Capitolinus Barbatus III
