= Numicia gens =

Ancient Roman family

The gens Numicia was an ancient patrician family at Rome. The first of the Numicii to appear in history was Titus Numicius Priscus, consul in 469 BC. Later members of the family were plebeian. Members of this gens are first mentioned down to imperial times, and the nomen Numicius is regularly confused with Numisius, which was probably nothing more than a different form of the same gentile name.

== Origin ==
The nomen Numicius appears to belong to a class of gentilicia formed from other names ending in -ex, -icis, or -icus, which took -icius as a suffix. However, if as seems likely, the name is really the same as Numisius, it might perhaps be derived from the praenomen Numerius.

== Branches and cognomina ==
The only surname of the Numicii in Republican times is Priscus, a common cognomen meaning "old, ancient", or "antique".

== Members ==
This list includes abbreviated praenomina. For an explanation of this practice, see filiation.

- Titus Numicius Priscus, consul in 469 BC, had the conduct of the war against the Volscians, defeating them before Antium, the Volscian capital, and taking the town of Caeno. When the Sabines attempted to take advantage of the consuls' absence, Numicius and his colleague invaded their territory simultaneously, ending the threat.
- Tiberius Numicius, tribune of the plebs in 320 BC, (Note: Livy names Lucius Julius in place of Tiberius Numicius.) was given as a prisoner to the Samnites, together with the other tribunes and the consuls, after the defeat of the Romans at the Caudine Forks, during the Second Samnite War. The Samnites saw their sacrifice as a pretext for renewing the war, and refused the prisoners, allowing them to return home.
- Publius Numicius Pica Caesianus, a praefectus equitum in the time of Augustus, he subsequently served as quaestor pro praetore in Asia, and tribune of the plebs.
- Numicius, the person to whom Horace addressed the sixth epistle of his first book. He might be the same person as Publius Numicius Pica Caesianus.
- Numicius Priscus, a member of the praetorian guard, mentioned in an inscription from Rome, dating to AD 147.
- Gaius Numicius, the former master of Gaius Numicius Eusebius, and perhaps also the former master of Prima Numicia Paulla and Gaius Numicius Philinus, or of Numicius Taurus.
- Lucius Numicius, the father of Marcus.
- Marcus Numicius L. f., named in an inscription from Helvia Ricina in Picenum.
- Publius Numicius, the former master of Publius Numicius Berullus. His wife may have been named Afraia, as that was the nomen of her freedwoman.
- Publius Numicius, the former master of Publius Numicius Surus and Numicia Laudica.
- Quintus Numicius, the former master of Quintus.
- Quintus Numicius Q. l., a freedman, named in an inscription from Rome.
- Marcus Numicius Acastus, a freedman, possibly of the wife of a Quintus Numisius. (Note: Acastus is named immediately following a Quintus Numisius Q. l. Thyrsus, and is identified as the freedman of an otherwise unidentified woman or wife. It would make sense if she were the wife of the Quintus Numisius who manumitted Thyrsus, although the nomina are different. Given the similarity of the nomina, however, either Numisius or Numicius could be a mistake for the other. But if the two spellings were in fact interchangeable, then there may be no mistake at all.)
- Publius Numicius P. l. Berullus, a freedman, and husband of Afraia Italia, freedwoman of his former master's wife, mentioned in an inscription from Rome as having donated six jars of ointment.
- Gaius Numicius C. l. Eusebius, buried at Rome, aged twelve.
- Numicia P. l. Laudica, a freedwoman buried at Rome.
- Prima Numicia C. l. Paulla, a freedwoman mentioned in an inscription from Rome.
- Gaius Numicius C. l. Philinus, a freedman mentioned in an inscription from Rome.
- Marcus Numicius Severus, tent-mate and heir of Publius Aelius Fuscus, a soldier in the third cohort of the praetorian guard, who was buried at Rome, aged twenty-two, after five years' service.
- Publius Numicius Suntrophus, mentioned in an inscription from Rome as having donated four jars of ointment.
- Publius Numicius P. l. Surus, a freedman buried at Rome.
- Numicius C. l. Taurus, a freedman mentioned in an inscription from Rome.
- Titus Numicius Thermus, mentioned in an inscription from Rome as having donated six jars of ointment.
- Publius Numicius Xanthus, probably a freedman, named in an inscription from Rome.
- Gaius Annius Numicius, named in an inscription from Ostia.
- Numicia Primigenia, female whose domus was found in Pompeii. Lived with someone named Lesbianus.

== See also ==
- List of Roman gentes

== Bibliography ==
- Marcus Tullius Cicero, De Officiis.
- Quintus Horatius Flaccus (Horace), Epistulae.
- Titus Livius (Livy), Ab Urbe Condita (History of Rome).
- Dionysius of Halicarnassus, Romaike Archaiologia.
- Dictionary of Greek and Roman Biography and Mythology, William Smith, ed., Little, Brown and Company, Boston (1849).
- Theodor Mommsen et alii, Corpus Inscriptionum Latinarum (The Body of Latin Inscriptions, abbreviated CIL), Berlin-Brandenburgische Akademie der Wissenschaften (1853–present).
- Paul von Rohden, Elimar Klebs, & Hermann Dessau, Prosopographia Imperii Romani (The Prosopography of the Roman Empire, abbreviated PIR), Berlin (1898).
- T. Robert S. Broughton, The Magistrates of the Roman Republic, American Philological Association (1952).
