= Titus Cloelius Siculus =

Roman consular tribune in 444 BC

Titus Cloelius Siculus was a Roman statesman of the early Republic, and one of the first consular tribunes in 444 BC. He was compelled to abdicate after a fault was found during his election. Two years later he was one of the founders of the colony of Ardea.

== Background ==
During the first decades of the Roman Republic, the relations between Rome's hereditary aristocracy, the patricians, and the common people, or plebeians, had grown increasingly difficult, leading to what historians refer to as the conflict of the orders. Following the abolition of the Decemvirs in 449 BC, the patricians were determined to exclude plebeians from holding the consulate, the chief magistracy of the Republic, while the plebeians were equally determined to obtain the consular authority. (Note: An argument for the exclusion of plebeians from the consulate was that no plebeian had ever held the office; this was accepted as fact by the Roman historians of later times, and the assertion was widely accepted until the nineteenth century, when scholars began to question the appearance of a number of names that were traditionally regarded as plebeian in the consular fasti down to the time of the first consular tribunes. Some of this apparent discrepancy may be resolved by supposing that some of the gentes involved had both patrician and plebeian branches, and that the early consuls belonged to the older, patrician families; but even so it seems likely that a few of the early consuls were indeed plebeians.) In 445, during the consulship of Marcus Genucius Augurinus (Note: Some scholars note that the later Genucii were plebeians, and therefore point to Marcus as an example of a plebeian who held the consulship prior to the establishment of the consular tribunes; but Marcus' brother, Titus, had been elected consul and subsequently one of the first decemvirs in 451; their family is generally supposed to have belonged to a patrician branch of the Genucii.) and Gaius Curtius, a compromise was reached, calling for the election of tribuni militum consulari potestate, or military tribunes with consular power (traditionally shortened to "consular tribunes") in place of consuls. Either patricians or plebeians could be elected to this new position, which satisfied the plebeians by opening the consular authority to their order, while at the same time reserving the dignity of the consulate itself to the patricians.

== Career ==
At the ensuing elections, three (Note: No ancient authority mentions any law fixing the number of consular tribunes, or indicates how the number to be elected on each occasion was determined; in subsequent years the number was always four or six (Diodorus Siculus names eight in 379, probably in error, as Livy only mentions six of them).) consular tribunes were chosen: Aulus Sempronius Atratinus, Titus Cloelius Siculus, and Lucius Atilius Luscus. Despite the promise of the new magistracy opening the consular authority to the plebeians, all of the consular tribunes elected were patricians. (Note: Modern scholarship has suggested that Atilius may have been a plebeian, but he could also have belonged to an older patrician family of the Atilii.) But within three months, the augurs announced that the tribunes had been wrongly elected: the consul Curtius, who had presided at the election, had taken the auspices without having properly selected his position. The consular tribunes were obliged to resign their authority, and consuls were elected in their place.

Robert Maxwell Ogilvie suggests that the cancellation of the elections came from "diehard patricians", who had opposed the creation of the consular tribuneship. As they controlled the augural college, they found a spurious reason to invalidate the election and secure a return to a pair of consuls they supported. The six-time consul Titus Quinctius Capitolinus Barbatus was a member of this group.

Two years later, during the consulate of Marcus Fabius Vibulanus and Postumus Aebutius Helva in 442, Cloelius was one of the triumviri coloniae deducendae appointed to establish a Roman colony at Ardea, an ancient city of Latium. Serving alongside Cloelius were Agrippa Menenius Lanatus and Marcus Aebutius Helva (the elder brother of the current consul).

Ardea had long been allied to Rome, but following the annexation of some of their land, the leading faction of the Ardeates had revolted in 445. The following year, the pro-Roman party at Ardea had regained control, and sent ambassadors to renegotiate the treaty with Rome, and seek the restoration of their territory. The treaty was renewed, but the rival factions at Ardea descended into civil war, with one side taking refuge inside the city walls and appealing to Rome for assistance, while the other enlisted the help of the Volscians, who laid siege to the town. The Romans raised the siege, and put the leaders of the anti-Roman faction to death.

The senate agreed to assist the remaining people of Ardea, whose population had been severely reduced by the fighting, and were now vulnerable to attack from the Volscians, by establishing a Roman colony. But in deference to the ancient treaty, and the loyalty of the remaining Ardeates, and in order to resolve the dissension over the city's territory, the senate and the consuls agreed that the majority of the colonists should be Rutuli, (Note: The Rutuli were Latins, and Ardea their ancient capital. According to legend, Aeneas had fought against the Rutuli after settling in Latium.) the original inhabitants of the land, and that the commissioners should allocate land to the native Ardeates before the Romans. Cloelius and his colleagues faithfully carried out their mandate, but they and the consuls became deeply unpopular with the Roman people, who felt that the Ardeate territory should have remained in Roman hands. The tribunes of the plebs passed a bill of impeachment against the triumvirs, but Cloelius and his colleagues avoided both trial and dishonour by enrolling themselves among the colonists, and settling at Ardea. Ogilvie considers that the threat of a trial is unhistorical and that the triumvirs did not settle in Ardea, because Agrippa Menenius Lanatus became consul in 439.

== See also ==
- Cloelia gens

== Bibliography ==
=== Ancient sources ===
- Dionysius of Halicarnassus, Romaike Archaiologia (Roman Antiquities).
- Titus Livius (Livy), History of Rome.

=== Modern sources ===
- T. Robert S. Broughton, The Magistrates of the Roman Republic, American Philological Association (1952).
- Robert Maxwell Ogilvie, Commentary on Livy, books 1–5, Oxford, Clarendon Press, 1965.

Political offices
Preceded by Marcus Genucius Augurinus, and Gaius Curtius Philo as Consuls of the Roman Republic	Consular Tribune of the Roman Republic; 444 BC with Aulus Sempronius Atratinus, and Lucius Atilius Luscus	Succeeded by Lucius Papirius Mugillanus, and Lucius Sempronius Atratinus as Suffect Consuls of the Roman Republic
