= Lucius Valerius Potitus =

Lucius Valerius Potitus may refer to:

- Lucius Valerius Potitus (consul 483 BC)
- Lucius Valerius Potitus (consul 392 BC)
- Lucius Valerius Poplicola Potitus, Roman consul in 449 BC
