= Titus Quinctius Capitolinus Barbatus =

5th-century BC Roman statesman, general and consul

Consul of the Roman Republic
- In office 1 August 471 BC – 31 July 470 BC Serving with Appius Claudius Sabinus Regillensis (consul 471 BC)
- Preceded by: Lucius Pinarius Mamercinus Rufus (consul 472 BC), Publius Furius Medullinus Fusus
- Succeeded by: Lucius Valerius Potitus (consul in 483 and 470 BC), Tiberius Aemilius Mamercus
- In office 1 August 468 BC – 31 July 467 Serving with Quintus Servilius Priscus Structus (consul 468 BC)
- Preceded by: Titus Numicius Priscus, Aulus Verginius Tricostus Caeliomontanus (consul 469 BC)
- Succeeded by: Tiberius Aemilius Mamercinus, Quintus Fabius Vibulanus
- In office 1 August 465 BC – 31 July 464 BC Serving with Quintus Fabius Vibulanus
- Preceded by: Quintus Servilius Priscus Structus (consul 468 BC), Spurius Postumius Albus Regillensis (consul 466 BC)
- Succeeded by: Aulus Postumius Albus Regillensis (consul 464 BC), Spurius Furius Medullinus Fusus (consul 464 BC)
- In office 13 December 446 BC – 12 December 445 BC Serving with Agrippa Furius Fusus
- Preceded by: Marcus Geganius Macerinus, Gaius Julius Iulus (consul 447 BC)
- Succeeded by: Marcus Genucius Augurinus, Gaius Curtius Philo
- In office 13 December 443 BC – 12 December 442 BC Serving with Marcus Geganius Macerinus
- Preceded by: Lucius Papirius Mugillanus, Lucius Sempronius
- Succeeded by: Marcus Fabius Vibulanus, Postumus Aebutius Elva Cornicen
- In office 13 December 439 BC – 12 December 438 BC Serving with Agrippa Menenius Lanatus
- Preceded by: Proculus Geganius Macerinus,
- Succeeded by: Mamercus Aemilius Mamercinus, Lucius Julius Iulus (consul 430 BC), Lucius Quinctius Cincinnatus

Personal details
- Born: 513 BC; Ancient Rome
- Died: Unknown (last recorded date was at 423 at age 90); Ancient Rome

Titus Quinctius Capitolinus Barbatus (513 BC – after 423 BC) was a Roman statesman and general who served as consul six times. Titus Quinctius was a member of the gens Quinctia, one of the oldest patrician families in Rome.

He was the son of Lucius Quinctius and grandson of Lucius Quinctius. He was possibly the brother of Lucius Quinctius Cincinnatus, who was suffect consul in 460 BC, and dictator in 458 BC and 439 BC. His son, who bore the same name, Titus Quinctius Capitolinus Barbatus, was elected consul in 421 BC and was possibly the military tribune with consular power in 405 BC.

According to Livy, Titus Quinctius was still alive in 423 BC, aged 90 years.

== Consulships ==
=== First Consulship ===
In 471 BC Titus Quinctius was elected consul with Appius Claudius Sabinus as his colleague. The latter was chosen by the Senate because of his uncompromising character as well as his father's hostility towards the plebs. Appius was expected to lead the fight against the bill proposed by the tribune of the plebs, Volero Publilius, who wanted to introduce the election of the tribunes of the plebs by the Tribal Assembly, tribe by tribe, thus excluding the vote of the patricians and their clients. If the law was ratified, the tribunes would gain greater political independence from the patricians and thus prevent them from influencing their selection and their actions.

After the turmoil in 473 BC, which was caused by the blockage of an agrarian law three years before and the death of a tribune who attempted to bring to justice former consuls, there was more unrest among the Roman people. The consul Titus Quinctius became a peacemaker, unlike Appius who strongly opposed the tribunes. Titus Quinctius barely managed to calm the crowd by adopting a more conciliatory approach. He forced Appius to retreat into the Curia Hostilia. There the senators urged Appius to abandon his intransigent attitude because it could lead to serious civil unrest. Isolated and deprived of political support, Appius was unable to do anything but permit the vote. The law, Lex Publilia Voleronis, was finally proclaimed.

Recognizing that political turmoil had weakened Rome, the Volsci and Aequi raided Roman territory. Titus Quinctius was given command against the Aequi and Appius against the Volscians. Appius struggled to maintain order in the ranks of his army and resorted to decimation to restore discipline. In contrast, the campaign against the Aequi proceeded without dissension. Indeed his troops returned to Rome with praises for Quinctius, calling him their 'parent'. The Aequi were forced to give up territory to the Romans. Titus Qinctius distributed all the captured loot to his men and returned to Rome victorious, as well as having succeeded in reconciling the plebs and the Senate.

=== Second Consulship ===
In 468 BC, the plebeians and patricians were still fighting each other over reforms to agrarian laws, with the people refusing to take part in the consular elections. The patricians and their clients elected Titus Quinctius for a second time with Quintus Servilius Priscus Structus as his colleague. Once again a war erupted which required the mobilization of the people, temporarily putting an end to the internal strife. The Sabines marched on Rome, while the Volscians stirred once more. Servilius pushed back the Sabines while Titus Quinctius led his men against the Volscians.

In an initial engagement the Romans were almost defeated, but Quinctius lifted their spirits by telling each wing of the army that the other was having great success. Thus re-animated, the Romans won the day. A period of rest followed, as both sides re-grouped. Then the Volsci launched a night attack on the Roman camp. But the consul kept the enemy at bay with a cohort of the allied Hernici, together with mounted trumpeters (the cornicines and tubicines to make the enemy think the Romans were about to make a counter-attack. This kept the enemy on edge during the night, and allowed the Romans a good sleep.

The next day Titus Quinctius followed a clever strategy that allowed him to avoid defeat because of the numerical inferiority of his army. During the battle the Romans repelled the first enemy line before facing the bulk of the opposing army positioned on a hill. Titus Quinctius hesitated, but his men were impatient and finally he gave the order to attack. The Volscians, supported by the Aequi, easily pushed back the first Roman ranks who then fled. Titus Quinctius courageously led his men to reach the top of the hill, pushed the enemy back to their camp which the Romans captured. Titus Quinctius was victorious and pushed his advantage by leading his army towards Antium, the capital of the Volsci. The town surrendered after a short siege, as the Volsci were unable to withstand the Romans after their recent defeat. Titus Quinctius returned to Rome and celebrated a triumph.

=== Establishment of a colony at Antium ===
In 467 BC, the two elected consuls, Tiberius Aemilius Mamercinus and Quintus Fabius Vibulanus, faced new tensions over the agrarian question. The tribunes of the plebs denounced the rich patricians, who monopolized public lands, and demanded fairer land distribution.

To avoid a new internal crisis, the consul Mamercinus proposed to establish a Latin colony at Antium, the Volscian town recently captured by the Romans and located on the coast. Titus Quinctius, Aulus Verginius Tricostus Caeliomontanus and Publius Furius Medullinus Fusus were appointed as commissioners (triumviri coloniae deducendae) to distribute the land and assign it to volunteer settlers. According to Livy, there were very few volunteers and so Volscians were added to the volunteers who established the Latin colony of Antium.

=== Third Consulship ===
In 465 BC, Titus Quinctius was elected consul for the third time. His fellow consul Quintus Fabius Vibulanus sent an embassy to the Aequi which failed to negotiate a peace. The Aequi began ravaging the Latin countryside, and both consuls with separate Roman armies together fought and defeated the enemy at Algidum.

The Aequi returned to continue ravaging the Latin countryside. Panic ensued at Rome, and Quinctius returned to the city, declared the justitium and appointed Quintus Servilius Priscus Structus as praefectus urbi whilst both consuls were absent. Quinctius then marched to engage the enemy, but he could not locate them, and returned to Rome calling an end to the justitium after four days. Meanwhile his colleague Fabius engaged and defeated the Aequi and ravaged the Aequian lands.

The same year, Quinctius held a lustrum to mark the end of a census. The count of Roman citizens was recorded as 124,214.

=== Proconsulate ===
The following year, consuls Aulus Postumius Albus Regillensis and Spurius Furius Fusus Medullinus led two separate campaigns against the Aequi and their allies who were preparing once again for war. Fusus was defeated in Hernici territory and his camp besieged. In Rome, the Senate gave Titus Quinctius proconsular powers with the mission to rescue the besieged consul, at the head of an army of Latin and Hernici allies. In the besieged camp, the Romans were cornered and the consul was wounded. Titus Quinctius arrived at the Battle of Corbio with his army and attacked the Aequi from behind while the consul's army, in a last effort, found a way out of the siege. The Romans then encircled and defeated their enemies. As his force was returning to Rome, Quinctius helped Postumius to defeat a second Aequian group that had been ravaging Roman land.

=== Quaestorship ===
Titus Quinctius was elected quaestor together with Marcus Valerius Maximus Lactuca in 458 BC and continued the prosecution of Marcus Volscius Fictor, tribune of the plebs, for carrying false witness against Titus Quinctius' nephew, Caeso Quinctius. Caeso Quinctius had been exiled in 461 BC by Volscius and his colleague, Aulus Verginius.

=== Fourth Consulship ===
In 446 BC, Titus Quinctius was elected consul for the fourth time alongside Agrippa Furius Fusus.

After the fall of the despotic Decemvirs, internal sedition broke out again. The Aequi and Volsci, taking advantage once more of the instability of the Roman political situation, ravaged Latium unopposed. Titus Quinctius then addressed the people noting the critical discord between the patricians and the plebeians and the fact that the people refuse to take up arms when the enemy was at the gates, preferring instead to attack the patricians. His speech had quite an effect on the people. The two consuls were then able to gather an army as the people were willing to be mobilized to fight the invaders. Agrippa Furius Fusus handed over the supreme command to Titus Quinctius, only keeping command of a part of the army. The Roman army managed to repulse the invading Aequi and Volscians and then took the enemy camp and gathered a large booty, part of which was the result of the Aequi and Volscians' earlier looting of Latium.

During the same year, the consuls were retained by the inhabitants of two Latin cities, Ardea and Aricia, to mediate a territorial dispute.

=== Interrex ===
In 444 BC Titus Quinctius was appointed interrex to hold the comitia. The year had begun by an election of three consular tribunes who had after three months been forced to abdicate because of flaws in their auspices of their election. They were replaced by two consuls, Lucius Papirius Mugillanus and Lucius Sempronius Atratinus.

=== Fifth Consulship ===
In 443 BC, together with Marcus Geganius Macerinus, Titus Quinctius was elected to his fifth consulship. While his colleague rescued the allied city of Ardea, plagued by civil war and besieged by the Volscians, Titus Quinctius maintained harmony in Rome. The Senate and the Roman people had such respect for the consul that this was one of the first years for some time without strife in the city.

=== Sixth Consulship ===
Once again, in 439 BC Titus Quinctius was elected consul, this time with Agrippa Menenius Lanatus. A major famine raged in Rome at this time and a rich plebeian, Spurius Maelius, bought wheat with his personal fortune to feed the population. His popularity was such that he considered making himself king. In response to this threat, the consuls appointed Cincinnatus, now over 80 years old, as dictator once more. He chose Caius Servilius Ahala as his master of the horse. According to tradition, he killed Spurius Maelius while he was resisting arrest, with the tacit agreement of the dictator. Immediately afterwards, Cincinnatus resigned as dictator and handed power back to the Senate.

Political offices
Preceded by Lucius Pinarius Mamercinus Rufus (consul 472 BC); Publius Furius Medullinus Fusus	Consul of the Roman Republic with Appus Claudius Sabinus; 471 BC	Succeeded by Lucius Valerius Potitus II; Tiberius Aemilius Mamercinus
Preceded by Titus Numicius Priscus; Aulus Verginius Tricostus Caeliomontanus (consul 469 BC)	Consul of the Roman Republic with Quintus Servilius Priscus Structus; 468 BC	Succeeded by Tiberius Aemilius Mamercinus II; Quintus Fabius Vibulanus
Preceded by Quintus Servilius Priscus Structus; Spurius Postumius Albus Regillensis	Consul of the Roman Republic with Quintus Fabius Vibulanus II; 465 BC	Succeeded by Aulus Postumius Albus Regillensis; Spurius Furius Medullinus Fusus (consul 464 BC)
Preceded by Marcus Geganius Macerinus; Gaius Julius Iulus	Consul of the Roman Republic with Agrippa Furius Fusus; 446 BC	Succeeded by Marcus Genucius Augurinus; Gaius Curtius Philo
Preceded by Lucius Papirius Mugillanus; Lucius Sempronius Atratinus	Consul of the Roman Republic with Marcus Geganius Macerinus II; 443 BC	Succeeded by Marcus Fabius Vibulanus; Postumus Aebutius Helva Cornicen
Preceded by Proculus Geganius Macerinus; Menenius Lanatus	Consul of the Roman Republic with Agrippa Menenius Lanatus; 439 BC	Succeeded by Mamercus Aemilius Mamercinus; Lucius Julius Iulus; Lucius Quinctius Cincinnatus
