= Tiberius Aemilius Mamercus =

5th century BC Roman senator and consul

Consul of the Roman Republic
- In office 1 August 470 BC – 31 July 469 BC Serving with Lucius Valerius Potitus (consul 483 BC)
- Preceded by: Appius Claudius Sabinus Regillensis (consul 471 BC), Titus Quinctius Capitolinus Barbatus
- Succeeded by: Titus Numicius Priscus, Aulus Verginius Tricostus Caeliomontanus (consul 469 BC)
- In office 1 August 467 BC – 31 July 466 BC Serving with Quintus Fabius Vibulanus
- Preceded by: Titus Quinctius Capitolinus Barbatus, Quintus Servilius Priscus Structus (consul 468 BC)
- Succeeded by: Quintus Servilius Priscus Structus (consul 468 BC), Spurius Postumius Albus Regillensis (consul 466 BC)

Personal details
- Born: Ancient Rome
- Died: Ancient Rome

Tiberius Aemilius Mamercus was a Roman senator active in the fifth century BC. He was consul in 470 and 467 BC.

== Family ==
Mamercus was a member of the Aemilii Mamerci, a branch of the gens Aemilia. He was the son of Lucius Aemilius Mamercus, consul in 484, 478, and 473 BC, and the grandson of a Mamercus Aemilius.

== Biography ==
In 470 BC, Mamercus was elected consul with Lucius Valerius Potitus Publicola as his colleague. The political situation in Rome was strained; the tribunes of the plebs continued to demand that land be distributed equally to the people. Livy states that Mamercus argued in favour of land distributions to the plebs. Tribunes Marcus Duillius and Gnaeus Siccius prosecuted Appius Claudius Sabinus, who was bitterly opposed to their legislation that distributed land to the people, however he died before the proceedings ended.

The Aequi and the Sabines, taking advantage of the internal conflict in Rome, raided Roman territory. Potitus was sent to fight the Aequi, while Mamercus fought a campaign against the Sabines. The Sabines confined themselves to their camp and would not engage the Roman army. Mamercus laid waste the Sabine countryside and also their villages, prompting the Sabines to come forth to stop him. The resulting battle was not definitive with both sides retreating. The war between the Romans and the Sabines continued in the following years.

Mamercus was elected consul a second time in 467 BC, with Quintus Fabius Vibulanus as his colleague. Mamercus again supported the agrarian law of the plebeian tribunes in favour of a distribution of land to the people and was confronted by the conservative senators. With his colleague Vibulanus, he successfully bought an end to the conflict by passing a law that the lands of the Volsci at the new Roman colony of Antium be distributed. Three commissioners were named for the purpose of dividing the lands.

Mamercus launched another military expedition against the Sabines while his colleague fought the Aequi. Mamercus could not provoke a definitive battle, despite extensive pillaging of Sabine territory.

== Bibliography ==
=== Primary sources ===
- Dionysius of Halicarnassus, Roman Antiquities, Book IX
- Livy, The History of Rome, Books II-III

=== Secondary sources ===
- Broughton, Thomas Robert Shannon (1951), The Magistrates of the Roman Republic, Philological Monograph No. 15, New York: American Philological Association, ISBN 0-89130-811-3

Political offices
Preceded by Appius Claudius Sabinus Regillensis (consul 471 BC); Titus Quinctius Capitolinus Barbatus	Consul of the Roman Republic with Lucius Valerius Potitus Publicola; 470 BC	Succeeded by Titus Numicius Priscus; Aulus Verginius Tricostus Caeliomontanus (consul 469 BC)
Preceded by Titus Quinctius Capitolinus Barbatus II; Quintus Servilius Priscus Structus	Consul of the Roman Republic with Quintus Fabius Vibulanus; 467 BC	Succeeded by Quintus Servilius Priscus Structus II; Spurius Postumius Albus Regillensis
