= Titus Pontificius =

Tribune in ancient Rome in 480 BC

Titus Pontificius was a tribune in ancient Rome in 480 BC.

Like his predecessor Spurius Licinius, he sought to promote a proposed agrarian law by encouraging the plebs to refuse to enrol for military service. However, the senators persuaded the other tribunes to oppose Pontificius, with the result that enrolment for military service was not hampered.

== See also ==
- Pontificia (gens)
