= Aulus Sempronius Atratinus (consular tribune 444 BC) =

Consular tribune of the Roman Republic

Consular Tribunes of the Roman Republic
- In office 13 December 444 – March 443 Serving with Titus Cloelius Siculus, Lucius Atilius Luscus
- Preceded by: Marcus Genucius Augurinus, Gaius Curtius Philo
- Succeeded by: Lucius Papirius Mugillanus, Lucius Sempronius Atratinus

Personal details
- Born: Unknown; Ancient Rome
- Died: Unknown; Ancient Rome

Aulus Sempronius Atratinus (fl. 5th century BC) was a statesman of the first century of the Roman Republic.

In 444 BC, he was elected to the first collegium of military tribunes with consular power with two other colleagues, Titus Cloelius Siculus and Lucius Atilius Luscus. This was the first time that military tribunes exercised power in Roman Republic, and this election was quickly challenged. The three abdicated after three months in office.

== Notes ==
Political offices
Preceded by Marcus Genucius Augurinus, and Gaius Curtius Philo as Consuls of the Roman Republic	Consular Tribune of the Roman Republic; 444 BC with Lucius Atilius Luscus, and Titus Cloelius Siculus	Succeeded by Lucius Papirius Mugillanus, and Lucius Sempronius Atratinus as Suffect consuls of the Roman Republic
