= Spurius Postumius Albus Regillensis (consul 466 BC) =

Roman senator and general (died 439 BC)

- Died: 439 BC
- Office: Consul (466 BC); Decemvir (451 BC)
- Children: Spurius Postumius Albus Regillensis (consul 432 BC)

Spurius Postumius Albus Regillensis (died 439 BC) was a patrician politician of Ancient Rome. His filiation as reported in the Fasti Capitolini suggests he was the son of Aulus Postumius Albus Regillensis, consul 496 BC, and brother of Aulus Postumius Albus Regillensis, consul 464 BC, although it must be observed that no great dependence can be placed upon genealogies from such early times.

He, or possibly his brother Aulus, was appointed to dedicate the Temple of Castor in 484 BC as duumviri aedi dedicandae. He was consul in 466 BC and is credited with the dedication of the temple of Dius Fidius while his consular colleague Quintus Servilius Priscus fought the Aequi.

He was either a augur or pontifex as gathered from an inscription saying that he co-opted the year in 462 BC, a role traditionally ascribed to one of these posts.

He was one of the three commissioners sent into Greece to collect information about the laws of that country leaving in 454 and returning in 452 BC. He was appointed as a member of the first decemvirate in 451 BC.

He commanded, as legatus, the center of the Roman army in the Battle of Corbio, in which the Aequians and Volscians were defeated in 446 BC.

He died in 439 BC and was replaced in his priesthood by Quintus Servilius Priscus, possibly identified as the same man as the dictator of 435 BC.

He was apparently the father of the Spurius Postumius Albus Regillensis who was consular tribune in 432 BC.

== See also ==
- Postumia gens

Political offices
Preceded by Ti. Aemilius Mamercus II; Q. Fabius Vibulanus	Roman consul 466 BC; With: Q. Servilius Priscus II	Succeeded by Quintus Fabius Vibulanus II; T. Quinctius Capitolinus Barbatus III
