= Lex Canuleia =

Ancient Roman law permitting marriage between Patricians and Plebeians

The lex Canuleia (‘Canuleian law’), or lex de conubio patrum et plebis, was a law of the Roman Republic, passed in the year 445 BC, restoring the right of conubium (marriage) between patricians and plebeians.

== Canuleius' first rogation ==
Five years earlier, as part of the process of establishing the Twelve Tables of Roman law, the second decemvirate had placed severe restrictions on the plebeian order, including a prohibition on the intermarriage of patricians and plebeians.

Gaius Canuleius, one of the tribunes of the plebs, proposed a rogatio repealing this law. The consuls, Marcus Genucius Augurinus and Gaius Curtius Philo, vehemently opposed Canuleius, arguing that the tribune was proposing nothing less than the breakdown of Rome's social and moral fabric, at a time when the city was faced with external threats. (Note: Specifically, a revolt at Ardea, Veientes raiding Roman territory, and increased activity at a fortification of the Aequi and Volsci.)

Undeterred, Canuleius reminded the people of the many contributions of Romans of lowly birth, including several of the kings, and pointed out that the Senate had willingly given Roman citizenship to defeated enemies, even while maintaining that the marriage of patricians and plebeians would be detrimental to the state. He then proposed that, in addition to restoring the right of conubium, the law should be changed to allow plebeians to hold the consulship; all but one of the other tribunes supported this measure.

An ill-chosen remark by the consul Curtius, to the effect that the children of mixed marriages might incur the displeasure of the gods, thereby preventing the proper taking of auspices, inflamed the people to the extent at which the consuls yielded to their demands, allowing a vote on Canuleius' original rogatio. The prohibition on intermarriage between patricians and plebeians was thus repealed.

== Second proposal ==
The second question, however, permitting plebeians to stand for the consulship, was not brought to a vote. The senator Gaius Claudius Sabinus, brother of one of the decemvirs, argued vehemently against it, and urged that force be used against the tribunes when they obstructed a levy of troops unless the Senate agreed to consider the law. This radical escalation was prevented by his colleague, Lucius Quinctius Cincinnatus, and his brother, Titus Quinctius Capitolinus Barbatus.

Claudius then suggested that military tribunes with consular power might be elected from either order, instead of consuls; but he was not willing to bring the matter forward himself, delegating the distasteful matter to Titus Genucius Augurinus, brother of the consul, who was of a mind to compromise with the plebeians. This proposal was well-received, and the first consular tribunes were elected for the following year, BC 444.

== In popular culture ==
In the novel, Goodbye, Mr. Chips, set in an English boarding school in the late nineteenth and early twentieth centuries, the schoolmaster Mr. Chipping describes the law to his Roman history class, suggesting a pun that could be used as a mnemonic device:

"So that, you see, if Miss Plebs wanted Mr. Patrician to marry her, and he said he couldn't, she probably replied: 'Oh yes, you can, you liar!' " (Note: The pun used by Mr. Chipping employs an older English pronunciation of Latin, in which ei is pronounced as in height, rather than as in weight.) (emphasis supplied).

== See also ==
- Roman law
- List of Roman laws
- List of legal Latin terms
- Morganatic marriage

== Bibliography ==
- Titus Livius (Livy), History of Rome.
- Dionysius of Halicarnassus, Romaike Archaiologia (Roman Antiquities).
- T. Robert S. Broughton, The Magistrates of the Roman Republic, American Philological Association (1952).
- Oxford Classical Dictionary, 2nd ed., N. G. L. Hammond and H. H. Scullard, eds., Clarendon Press (1970).
- Harriet I. Flower, Roman Republics, Princeton University Press (2011), ISBN 1-4008-3116-4.
