= Aulus Sempronius Atratinus =

Aulus Sempronius Atratinus may refer to:

- Aulus Sempronius Atratinus, consular tribune of the Roman Republic in 425, 420 and 416 BC.
- Aulus Sempronius Atratinus, consular tribune of the Roman Republic in 444 BC.
- Aulus Sempronius Atratinus, consul of the Roman Republic in 497 and 491 BC.
