= Numisia gens =

Ancient Roman family

The gens Numisia was a family at ancient Rome. Members of this gens are first mentioned in the fourth century BC, and from the second century BC to imperial times, they held a number of important magistracies. The name Numisius is frequently confused with that of Numicius, and in fact it seems probable that the two were originally the same. The Numicii of the early Republic are thought to have been patricians, and the Numisii mentioned in later sources were plebeians; but patrician families frequently developed plebeian branches over time.

== Origin ==
In all probability, the nomen Numisius is merely a different orthography of Numicius, although this does not establish which is the original form. Numicius appears to belong to a class of gentilicia formed from other names ending in -ex, -icis, or -icus, which took -icius as a suffix. But if Numisius is the true orthography, then the nomen is probably derived from the praenomen Numerius.

== Branches and cognomina ==
The Numisii of the Republic were not divided into any families, and none of them bore any surname. Various cognomina are found in imperial times, of which the most notable may be Lupus, "a wolf", and Rufus, "red", typically given to someone with red hair.

== Members ==
This list includes abbreviated praenomina. For an explanation of this practice, see filiation.

- Lucius Numisius, one of the praetors of the Latin League in 340 BC, and subsequently the principal commander of the Latin forces during the Latin War.
- Gaius Numisius, praetor in 177 BC, was assigned the province of Sicily.
- Titus Numisius T. f. Tarquiniensis, a resident of Tarquinii, was one of the commissioners sent in 167 BC to settle the affairs of Macedonia following the Third Macedonian War. He was also one of the senate's emissaries sent to mediate between Antiochus IV, Ptolemy VI, and Ptolemy VIII.
- Numisius, an architect whose plan for building a house or villa Cicero calls Numisiana forma.
- Numisius Tiro, described by Cicero as a brigand employed by the triumvir Marcus Antonius.
- Numisia Galla, a woman whose cause is described by the elder Seneca.
- Numisius, an architect, who built the theatre at Herculaneum.
- Gaius Numisius, a member of an important local family of Carthago Nova, named on a stone removed from the Monastery of San Ginés de la Jara in 2005.
- Numisius Lupus, commander of the eighth legion in Moesia. When the province was invaded by the Roxolani, Lupus and his fellow commanders met and defeated them decisively, and were rewarded with the insignia of consuls. Numisius Rufus supported the Flavian faction in the civil wars of 69 CE and marched the 8th legion to Verona which he helped to fortify.
- Numisius Rufus, a legate who with Mummius Lupercus, helped defend Vetera Castra during the rebellion of Civilis, in AD 69 and 70. He escaped the camp before it fell, and went to Novaesium, where he was taken prisoner. He was taken to Treviri, where he was put to death by Valentinus and Tutor.
- Publius Numisius Celer, the father of Numisia Celerina.
- Numisia P. f. Celerina, the wife of Decimus Fonteius Frontinianus Lucius Stertinius Rufinus, legate in Numidia from AD 160 to 162.
- Lucius Numisius, the father of Numisia Maximilla.
- Numisia L. f. Maximilla, Vestalis Maxima in AD 201.
- Numisia Procula, known from an inscription on a water pipe.
- Numisius Licinianus, a senator, and one of the municipal officials of Beneventum.
- Numisius Quintianus, a vir perfectissimus, known from a letter dating from AD 239.
- Numisius Victorinus, a vir perfectissimus, and the father of Gaius Clodius Fabricius Numisius Victorinus.
- Gaius Clodius Fabricius Numisius Victorinus, a man of praetorian rank.

== See also ==
- List of Roman gentes

== Bibliography ==
- Polybius, Historiae (The Histories).
- Marcus Tullius Cicero, Epistulae ad Quintum Fratrem, Philippicae.
- Titus Livius (Livy), Ab Urbe Condita (History of Rome).
- Lucius Annaeus Seneca (Seneca the Elder), Controversiae.
- Dictionary of Greek and Roman Biography and Mythology, William Smith, ed., Little, Brown and Company, Boston (1849).
- Wilhelm Dittenberger, Sylloge Inscriptionum Graecarum (Collection of Greek Inscriptions, abbreviated SIG), Leipzig (1883).
- George Davis Chase, "The Origin of Roman Praenomina", in Harvard Studies in Classical Philology, vol. VIII (1897).
- Paul von Rohden, Elimar Klebs, & Hermann Dessau, Prosopographia Imperii Romani (The Prosopography of the Roman Empire, abbreviated PIR), Berlin (1898).
- T. Robert S. Broughton, The Magistrates of the Roman Republic, American Philological Association (1952).
- J.M. Abascal Palazón and S.F. Ramallo Asensio (eds.), La ciudad de Carthago Nova 3: La documentación epigráfica (The City of Carthago Nova 3: the Epigraphic Documentation), Murcia (1997).
