= Lucius Pinarius Mamercinus Rufus (consul 472 BC) =

Roman politician, consul in 472 BC

Consul of the Roman Republic
- In office 1 August 472 BC – 31 July 471 BC Serving with Publius Furius Medullinus Fusus
- Preceded by: Vopiscus Julius Iulus, Lucius Aemilius Mamercus
- Succeeded by: Titus Quinctius Capitolinus Barbatus, Appius Claudius Sabinus Regillensis (consul 471 BC)

Personal details
- Born: Unknown Ancient Rome
- Died: Unknown Ancient Rome

Lucius Pinarius Mamercinus Rufus was a Roman politician during the 5th century BC, and was consul in 472 BC.

== Biography ==
=== Consulship ===
In 472 BC, he was elected consul with Publius Furius Medullinus Fusus. During their consulship, tribune of the plebs Volero Publilius proposed a law (Rogato Publilia) providing that plebeian tribunes should be elected by the Tribal Assembly, hoping to exclude patricians and their clients in the vote and deprive them of their influence under the resulting system. (Note: Livy, Roman History, II. 56) (Note: Dionysius of Halicarnassus, Roman Antiquities, IX. 40-42)

According to Varro, the "Lex Pinaria Furia of the intercalary month" is ascribed to Furius and Pinarius. (Note: Macrobius, Saturnalia, I. 13.21) It mentions the method of additional days permitted to the dispenser of days which could be added to the calendar based on the lunar cycle.

== Bibliography ==
=== Ancient authors ===
- Dionysius of Halicarnassus in Romaike Archaiologia book 9
- Titus Livius in Roman History book 2.

=== Modern authors ===
- Broughton, Thomas Robert Shannon (1951), The Magistrates of the Roman Republic, Philological Monograph No. 15, New York: American Philological Association, ISBN 0-89130-811-3
- King, Richard Jackson (2006), Desiring Rome: Male Subjectivity and Reading Ovid's Fasti, Ohio State University Press, ISBN 0-8142-1020-1

Political offices
Preceded by Vopiscus Julius Iulus, and Lucius Aemilius Mamercus III	Consul of the Roman Republic; 472 BC with Publius Furius Medullinus Fusus	Succeeded by Titus Quinctius Capitolinus Barbatus, and Appius Claudius Sabinus
