= Antium =

Former human settlement and archaeological site near Rome

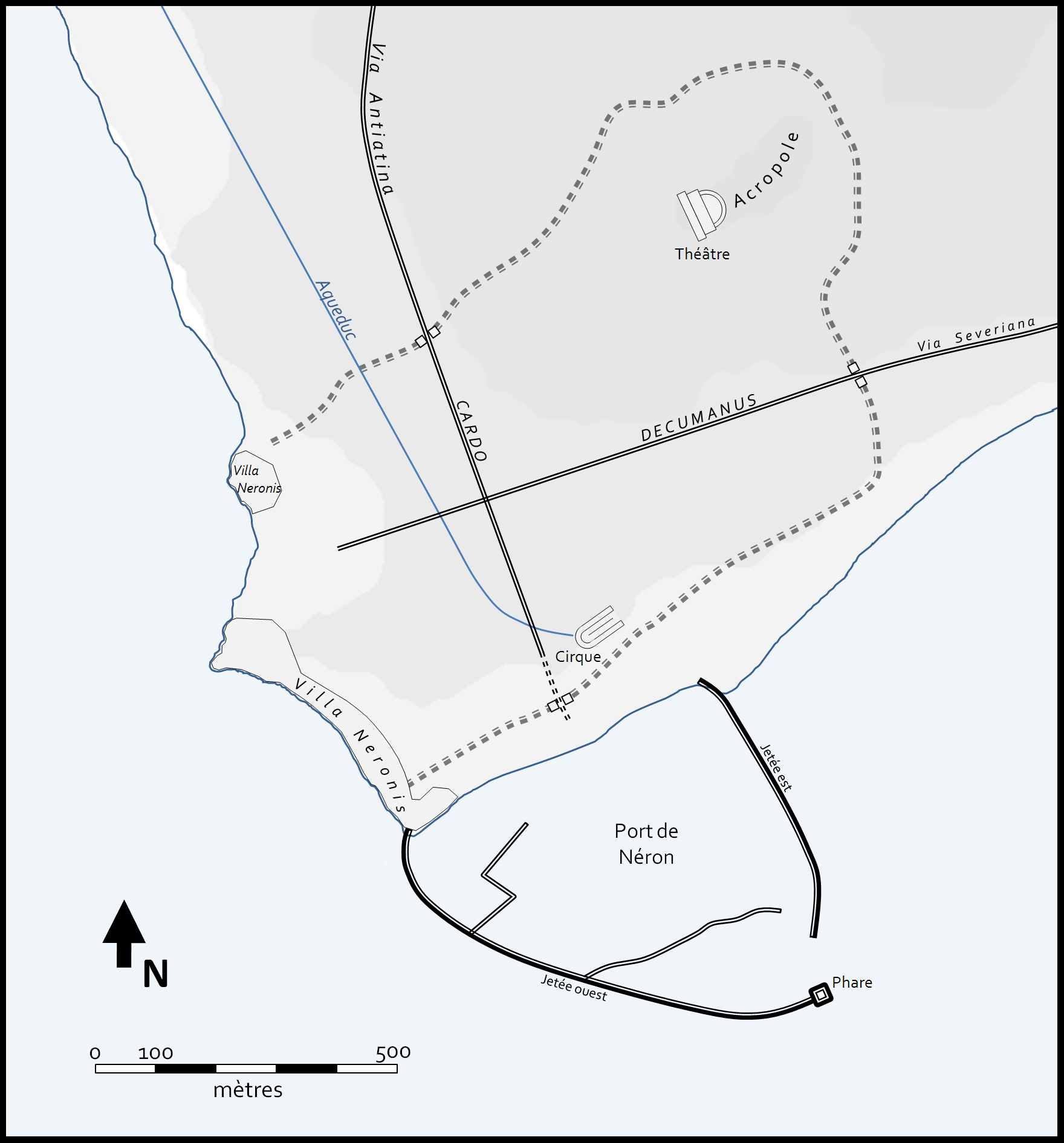
- Plan of Antium

- Location within Italy
- Click on the map to see marker.
- 41°26′52.61″N 12°37′44.59″E
- Type: Settlement
- Cultures: Latins, Volsci, Ancient Rome
- Location: Anzio and Nettuno, Rome, Italy
- Region: Lazio

History
- Built: 11th century BC - beginning 1st millennium BC
- Abandoned: Middle Ages

Site notes
- Condition: Ruined
- Owner: Public
- Public access: Yes

Antium was an ancient coastal town in Latium, south of Rome. An oppidum was founded by people of Latial culture (11th century BC or the beginning of the 1st millennium BC), which then became the main stronghold of the Volsci until it was conquered by the Romans.

The territory of Roman Antium corresponded almost entirely to modern Anzio and Nettuno.

In some versions of Rome's foundation myth, Antium was founded by Anteias, a son of Odysseus by Circe.

== Location ==
The Latin-Volscian town stood in the Capo d'Anzio (modern Anzio), on a higher ground and somewhat away from the shore, though it extended down to it. This was defended by a deep ditch, which can still be traced, and by walls, a portion of which, on the eastern side, constructed of rectangular blocks of tufa, was brought to light in 1897. The fortification of the town would included the acropolis, to which it would be adjacent to the east, isolated but connected. The Latin colony of 467 BC, of which it will be said later, would be installed alongside the fortified Latin-Volscian oppidum, also to the east.

A coeval port town, Caenon, was the port under the control of Antium (which did not have a natural harbour of its own): according to alternative theories, the port of Caenon would be located in the Capo d'Anzio, or the port town very north of it, or the town on a hill near Nettuno to the east, and the port over the mouth of the nearby river Loricina.

The settlement of Roman Antium was certainly present in the area of the Capo d'Anzio (in particular, a presumed extensive town since the mid-republican age, the imperial colony and the great harbour of Nero), but a parallel agricultural settlement, with the same name, was likely to be in the same position as modern Nettuno since the colony of 338 BC; so from 60 AD the colonia Antium of Nero in the Capo d'Anzio would coexisted with a supposed, more ancient, civitas Antium in Nettuno, which in the 4th century AD would have been the only real town: a thesis that has found some perplexities or an opposition.

== History ==
=== Volscian Antium ===
According to a theory, the Volsci controlled the Antiates area since the 7th century BC, but the common orientation thinks about an occupation at the beginning of the 5th century BC, (likely in 493 BC) or shortly before. As said in the beginning, for a long time Antium was the capital of the Antiates Volsci, settled on the Thyrrenian coast.

In 493 BC the Roman consul Postumus Cominius Auruncus fought and defeated two armies from Antium and as a result captured the Volscian towns of Longula, Pollusca and Corioli (to the north of Antium).

According to Plutarch the Roman leader Coriolanus, who fought at Corioli, took refuge at Antium to the noble Attius Tullius Aufidius, when the Roman had been accused of disloyalty to Rome and the Volsci. Aufidius obtained consent that, by Volscian hand, Coriolanus was first tried, then assassinated before the end of the trial.

In 469 BC the town Caenon was destroyed by the Roman consul Titus Numicius Priscus.

In 468 BC Antium was captured by the Roman consul Titus Quinctius Capitolinus Barbatus following a war started by the Volsci, and the mentioned Latin colony was planted there the next year. Three Roman ex-consuls were appointed as commissioners to allocate the lands (triumviri coloniae deducendae) amongst Roman colonists. They were Titus Quinctius, the consul of the previous year who had captured Antium from the Volsci; Aulus Verginius Tricostus Caeliomontanus, the consul of 469 BC; and Publius Furius Medullinus Fusus, the consul of 472 BC.

In 464 BC the Antiates were suspected of allying with the Aequi against Rome. The chief men of Antium were summoned to Rome but they did not give adequate explanations. Antium was asked to contribute emergency troops for the Roman war against the Aequi, however the force of 1,000 troops from Antium arrived too late to help.

In 338 BC the consul Gaius Menius Publius suddenly attacked and defeated the troops of Aricia, Lanuvium and Velitres as they were joining the Antiates next to the river Astura. Antium was finally defeated and its warships seized, a part taken to the arsenals in Rome, while the others burned. The town was banned from navigation, and Gaius Menius had the rostra of the burned ships mounted in the Roman Forum as ornaments of the speaker's platform thenceforth called the Rostra.

=== Roman Antium ===
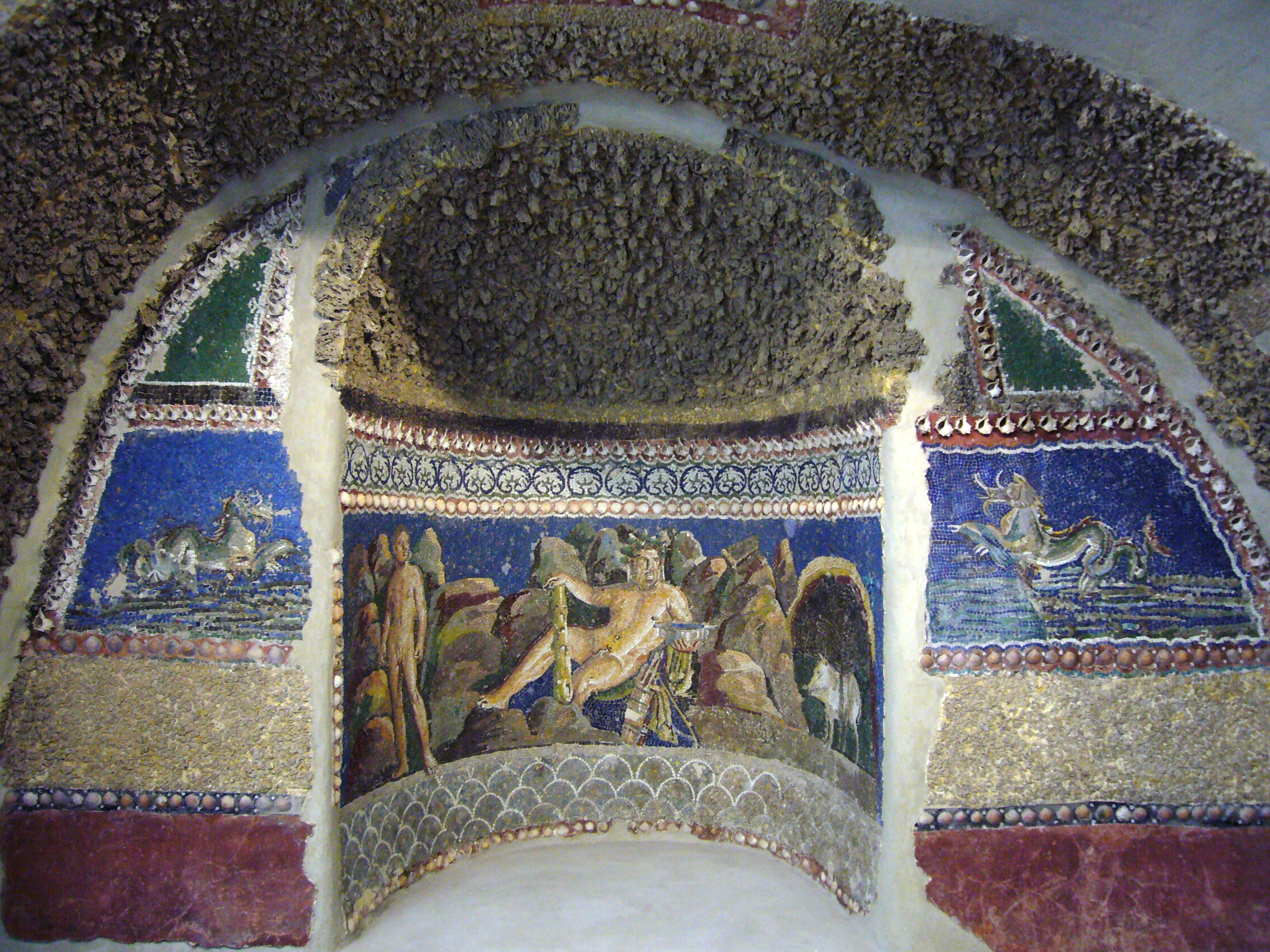
Mosaic from the nymphaeum

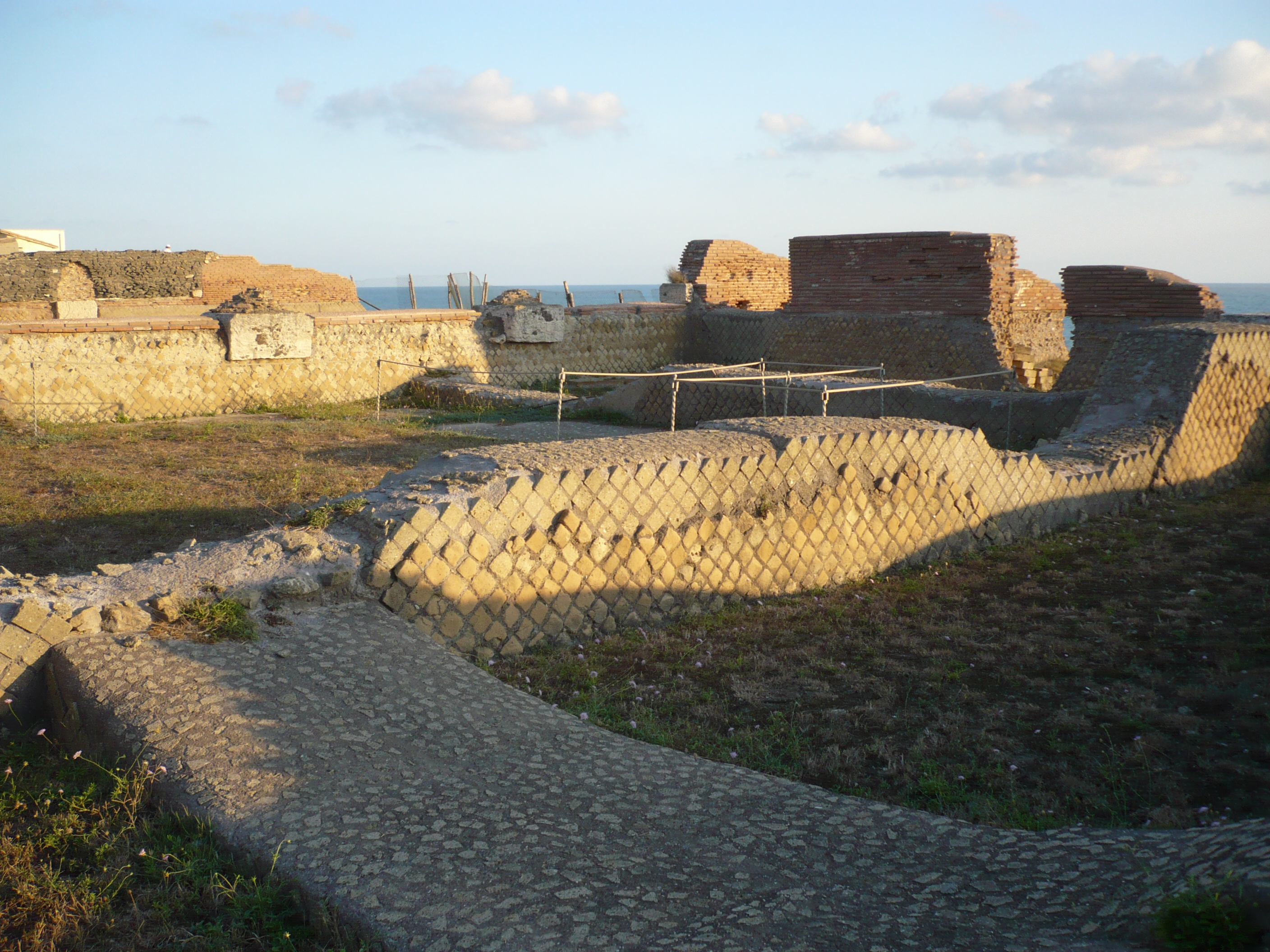
Ruins of the Domus Neroniana

In 338 BC Antium became a colonia with Roman citizenship of the Antiates, and in 317 BC it became a municipium. The Roman colony had duumvirs, and quaestors were also present as magistrates.

During the civil war against Gaius Marius, Antium - breadbasket of Rome - was allied with Sulla: in 87 BC it suffered a surprise attack and was devastated by the Marian troops, with many citizen deaths.

With the expansion of Roman Republic Antium was just far enough away to be insulated from the riots and tumults of Rome. The Romans built magnificent seaside villas there and their remains are conspicuous all along the shore, both to the east and to the northwest of the town. Gaius Maecenas also had a villa. Many ancient masterpieces of sculpture have been found there: the Fanciulla d'Anzio, the Borghese Gladiator (in the Louvre) and the Apollo Belvedere (in the Vatican) were all discovered in the ruins of villas at Antium. When Cicero returned from exile, it was at Antium that he reassembled the battered remains of his libraries, where the scrolls would be secure.

Of the villas, the most famous was the imperial villa, known as Domus Neroniana (Villa of Nero), which was used by each emperor in turn, up to the Severans and which extended some 800 metres (2,600 ft) along the seafront of the Capo d'Anzio. Augustus received a delegation from Rome there to acclaim him Pater patriae ("Father of his Country"). The Julian and Claudian emperors frequently visited it; both Emperor Caligula and Nero were born in Antium. Nero razed the villa on the site to rebuild it on a more massive scale and according to an imperial style. Including a theatre were built in Antium. In 60 AD - probably for stimulate economic activity in the territory -, Nero also founded a colony with praetorian veterans and rich superior centurions; in addition he built a new harbour, the projecting moles of which still exist.

Of the famous temple of Fortune (Horace, Od. i. 35) no remains are known, but its location is assumed in the Capo d'Anzio, area of the Domus Neroniana.

=== Late Antiquity ===
There are records of the participation of a few bishops of Antium in synods held in Rome: Gaudentius in 465, Felix in 487, Vindemius in 499 and 501. Barbarian incursions in the 6th century put an end to its existence as a residential bishopric. Accordingly, Antium is today listed by the Catholic Church as a titular see.

=== Middle Ages ===
Attacked by the Vandals of Gaiseric (5th century), the Goths of Vitiges (6th century), and then by the Saracens, in the Middle Ages Antium was deserted in favour of Nettuno, which maintained the legacy of the ancient town.

Nettuno is usually attributed only a medieval origin, but in the modern era it was considered a natural heir, a continuation of Antium; a view taken up by a contemporary orientation.
