= Aulus Postumius Albus Regillensis (consul 464 BC) =

Roman senator and general, consul in 464 BC

Aulus Postumius Albus Regillensis was a patrician politician of ancient Rome, and apparently son of Aulus Postumius Albus Regillensis, and therefore brother of Spurius Postumius Albus Regillensis. He, or possibly his brother Spurius, was appointed to dedicate the Temple of Castor in 484 BC as duumviri aedi dedicandae.

He was consul in 464 BC, carried on war against the Aequians, and protected the border from raiders.

He (or his brother Spurius) was either a augur or pontifex as gathered from an inscription saying that he co-opted the year in 462 BC, a role traditionally ascribed to one of these posts.

Before the Battle of Mount Algidus he was sent as ambassador, along with Quintus Fabius Vibulanus and Publius Volumnius Amintinus Gallus, to the Aequians in 458 BC, on which occasion he was insulted by their commander, who told him to take Rome's entreaties and tell them to an oak tree.

== See also ==
- Postumia gens

Political offices
Preceded by Quintus Fabius Vibulanus II; Titus Quinctius Capitolinus Barbatus III	Roman consul 464 BC with Spurius Furius Medullinus Fusus	Succeeded by Publius Servilius Priscus; Lucius Aebutius Elva
