= Algidum =

Algidum (Ancient Greek: Ἄλγιδος) was a town in ancient Italy at the foot of Mount Algidus on the Via Latina.

== Geography ==
It was located near the border between the territory of ancient Latium and the territory of the Aequi.

== Architecture ==
It housed a temple to Diana.

== History ==
In 465 BC, it was the site of a battle between Roman forces led by the consuls Quintus Fabius Vibulanus and Titus Quinctius Capitolinus Barbatus and the Aequi, which resulted in a victory for the Romans.

In 431 BC, armies from the Aequi and Volsci tribes occupied Algidus. According to some sources, Roman troops led by the consuls Titus Quinctius Poenus Cincinnatus and Gaius Julius Mento launched an attack on them soon after, but were defeated. Their defeat is said to have been the cause for Aulus Postumius Tubertus being appointed dictator. On the 18th of June, Postumius launched an attack on the Aequi and Volsci, and succeeded in dislodging them. In 419/418 BC, the Aequi and Labicani briefly occupied the city.

=== Primary sources ===
- Strabo, Geography, 5.3.9
- Livy, Ab urbe condita, 3.2.

=== Bibliography ===
- Foster, B.O. (1984). Livy: History of Rome. Harvard University Press. ISBN 9780674991484.
- Rudd, Niall (2015). Odes and Epodes. Harvard University Press. doi:10.4159/DLCL.horace-hymn_new_age.2004.
