= Canuleia gens =

Ancient Roman family

Gaius Canuleius, tribune of the plebs in 445 BC, addresses the senate (Paris, MS fr. 273–274, 15th century).

The gens Canuleia was a minor plebeian family at ancient Rome. Although members of this gens are known throughout the period of the Republic, and were of senatorial rank, none of them ever obtained the consulship. However, the Canuleii furnished the Republic with several tribunes of the plebs.

== Origin ==
The nomen Canuleius belongs to a large class of gentilicia formed using the suffix -eius, which was typically of Oscan names. It might perhaps be derived from the same root as Kanus, a surname originally referring to someone with white hair.

== Praenomina ==
The main praenomina of the Canuleii were Lucius, Gaius, and Marcus, the three most common names throughout all periods of Roman history.

== Branches and cognomina ==
None of the Canuleii mentioned by ancient writers bore a cognomen, except for Lucius Canuleius Dives, praetor in 171 BC. His surname originally signified someone possessing great wealth.

== Members ==
Monument of (Quintus Canuleius) Alexander, son of Quintus Canuleius Alexander and Clarina. Buried at Rome, second century, aged three years, four months, eighteen days.

- Gaius Canuleius, tribune of the plebs in 445 BC, proposed the lex Canuleia, restoring the right of patricians and plebeians to intermarry. His proposal that the consulship should be opened to the plebeians failed, but as a compromise the patricians agreed to the election of military tribunes with consular power, who might be chosen from either order, in place of consuls.
- Marcus Canuleius, tribune of the plebs in 420 BC, accused Gaius Sempronius Atratinus, the consul of 423, of misconduct during the Volscian war. Together with his colleagues, Canuleius also proposed a measure concerning the distribution of public land.
- Lucius Canuleius, one of five ambassadors sent by the Roman Senate to Aetolia in 174 BC.
- Lucius Canuleius Dives, praetor in 171 BC, was assigned the province of Hispania, where the senate ordered Canuleius to investigate claims of extortion by his precesessors. During his term, Canuleius helped to establish a colony at Carteia.
- Canuleius, a senator, was one of the ambassadors to Egypt before 160 BC.
- Gaius Canuleius, tribune of the plebs in 100 BC, accused Publius Furius, who had been his colleague, for siding with Saturninus against the senate, and for opposing the recall of Metellus Numidicus from exile. His actions were so unpopular that he was slain by an angry mob, without having the opportunity to defend himself.
- Lucius Canuleius, one of the publicani, a collector of duties for the harbour of Syracuse, at the time when the government of Sicily was held by Verres.
- Marcus Canuleius, mentioned by Cicero as a defendant represented by the eminent orators Quintus Hortensius and Gaius Aurelius Cotta; Cicero does not mention the charge against Canuleius.
- Canuleius, mentioned by Cicero in 49 BC.
- Lucius Canuleius, a legate of Caesar during the Civil War. In 48 BC, Caesar gave him the task of collecting grain from Epirus.

== See also ==
- List of Roman gentes

== Bibliography ==
- Polybius, Historiae (The Histories).
- Marcus Tullius Cicero, Brutus, De Republica, Epistulae ad Atticum, In Verrem.
- Gaius Julius Caesar, Commentarii de Bello Civili (Commentaries on the Civil War).
- Dionysius of Halicarnassus, Romaike Archaiologia (Roman Antiquities).
- Titus Livius (Livy), History of Rome.
- Lucius Annaeus Florus, Epitome de T. Livio Bellorum Omnium Annorum DCC (Epitome of Livy: All the Wars of Seven Hundred Years).
- Appianus Alexandrinus (Appian), Bellum Civile (The Civil War).
- Dictionary of Greek and Roman Biography and Mythology, William Smith, ed., Little, Brown and Company, Boston (1849).
- George Davis Chase, "The Origin of Roman Praenomina", in Harvard Studies in Classical Philology, vol. VIII, pp. 103–184 (1897).
- D.P. Simpson, Cassell's Latin and English Dictionary, Macmillan Publishing Company, New York (1963).
- John C. Traupman, The New College Latin & English Dictionary, Bantam Books, New York (1995).
