= Carsoli =

- Comune
- Comune di Carsoli
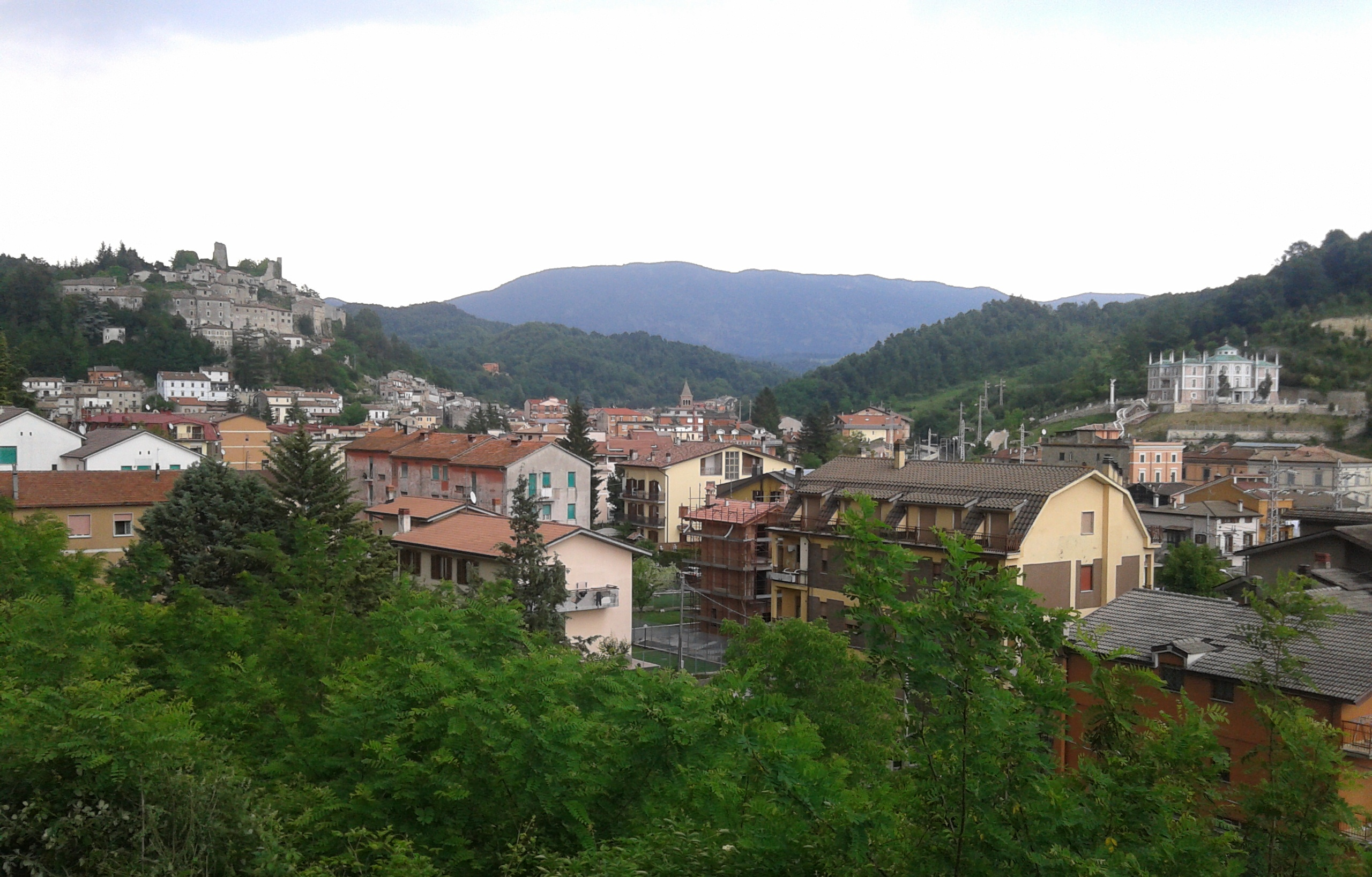

- Coat of arms

- Location within Italy Location within Abruzzo
- Coordinates: 42°06′N 13°05′E
- Country: Italy
- Region: Abruzzo
- Province: L'Aquila (AQ)
- Frazioni: Colli di Montebove, Montesabinese, Pietrasecca, Poggio Cinolfo, Tufo Basso, Tufo di Carsoli, Villa Romana

Government
  - Mayor: Loreto Alessandro Marcangeli (Civic list)

Area
  - Total: 466 km^{2} (180 sq mi)
- Elevation: 714 m (2,343 ft)

Population (31 July 2017)
  - Total: 5,312
  - Density: 11.4/km^{2} (29.5/sq mi)
- Demonym: Carsolani
- Time zone: UTC+1 (CET)
  - Summer (DST): UTC+2 (CEST)
- Postal code: 67061
- Dialing code: 0863
- Patron saint: St. Victoria
- Saint day: December 23
- Website: Official website

Carsoli (Marsicano: Carsòi) is a town and comune in the province of L'Aquila, Abruzzo (central Italy). The ancient Roman city lies 4 kilometres (2.5 mi) southwest of the modern town.

== History ==
The ancient city, known as Carsioli (or Carseoli), was founded in the country of the Aequi between 302 and 298 BC, just after the establishment of Alba Fucens, no doubt as a stronghold to guard the road to the latter. It is mentioned in 211 BC as one of the 12 of 30 Latin colonies that protested their inability to furnish more men or money for the war against Hannibal. It is known that, in 168 BC, it was used as a place of confinement for political prisoners. It was sacked in the Social War, but probably became a municipium after it. The 1st century agricultural writer Columella possessed estates there.

The modern town of Carsoli first appears in a diploma of 866 AD, but the old site does not seem to have been abandoned until the 13th century.

== Main sights ==
The line of the city walls (originally in tuff, and reconstructed in limestone), built of rectangular blocks, can still be seen. There are remains of several ancient buildings, including the podium or base, of a temple, and also the ancient branch road from the Via Valeria. The 43rd milestone of the Via Valeria still lies at or near its original site; it was set up by Nerva in 97 AD.

Some 2 kilometres (1.2 mi) to the northwest of Carsoli are the remains of an ancient aqueduct consisting of a buttressed wall of concrete crossing a valley.

== Climate ==
Climate data for Carsoli, elevation 592 m (1,942 ft), (1951–2000)
Month	Jan	Feb	Mar	Apr	May	Jun	Jul	Aug	Sep	Oct	Nov	Dec	Year
Mean daily maximum °C (°F)	9.5 (49.1)	10.1 (50.2)	12.7 (54.9)	15.7 (60.3)	20.2 (68.4)	24.1 (75.4)	27.9 (82.2)	28.4 (83.1)	24.4 (75.9)	19.5 (67.1)	14.2 (57.6)	10.5 (50.9)	18.1 (64.6)
Daily mean °C (°F)	3.5 (38.3)	4.2 (39.6)	6.5 (43.7)	9.4 (48.9)	13.3 (55.9)	16.7 (62.1)	19.5 (67.1)	19.8 (67.6)	16.7 (62.1)	12.2 (54.0)	8.2 (46.8)	5.2 (41.4)	11.3 (52.3)
Mean daily minimum °C (°F)	−2.4 (27.7)	−1.7 (28.9)	0.4 (32.7)	3.1 (37.6)	6.4 (43.5)	9.3 (48.7)	11.0 (51.8)	11.3 (52.3)	9.0 (48.2)	5.0 (41.0)	2.2 (36.0)	−0.2 (31.6)	4.5 (40.0)
Average precipitation mm (inches)	88.4 (3.48)	103.1 (4.06)	85.4 (3.36)	99.0 (3.90)	76.8 (3.02)	68.7 (2.70)	48.8 (1.92)	60.4 (2.38)	83.4 (3.28)	117.2 (4.61)	158.8 (6.25)	141.3 (5.56)	1,131.3 (44.52)
Average precipitation days	8.6	8.7	9.0	10.9	8.6	7.5	4.7	5.0	6.8	8.7	10.3	10.3	99.1
Source: Regione Abruzzo

== See also ==
- Castello di Carsoli
