= Castello di Carsoli =

Coordinates: 42.1013°N 13.0878°E

Castle of Carsoli
- Castello di Carsoli
- Carsoli
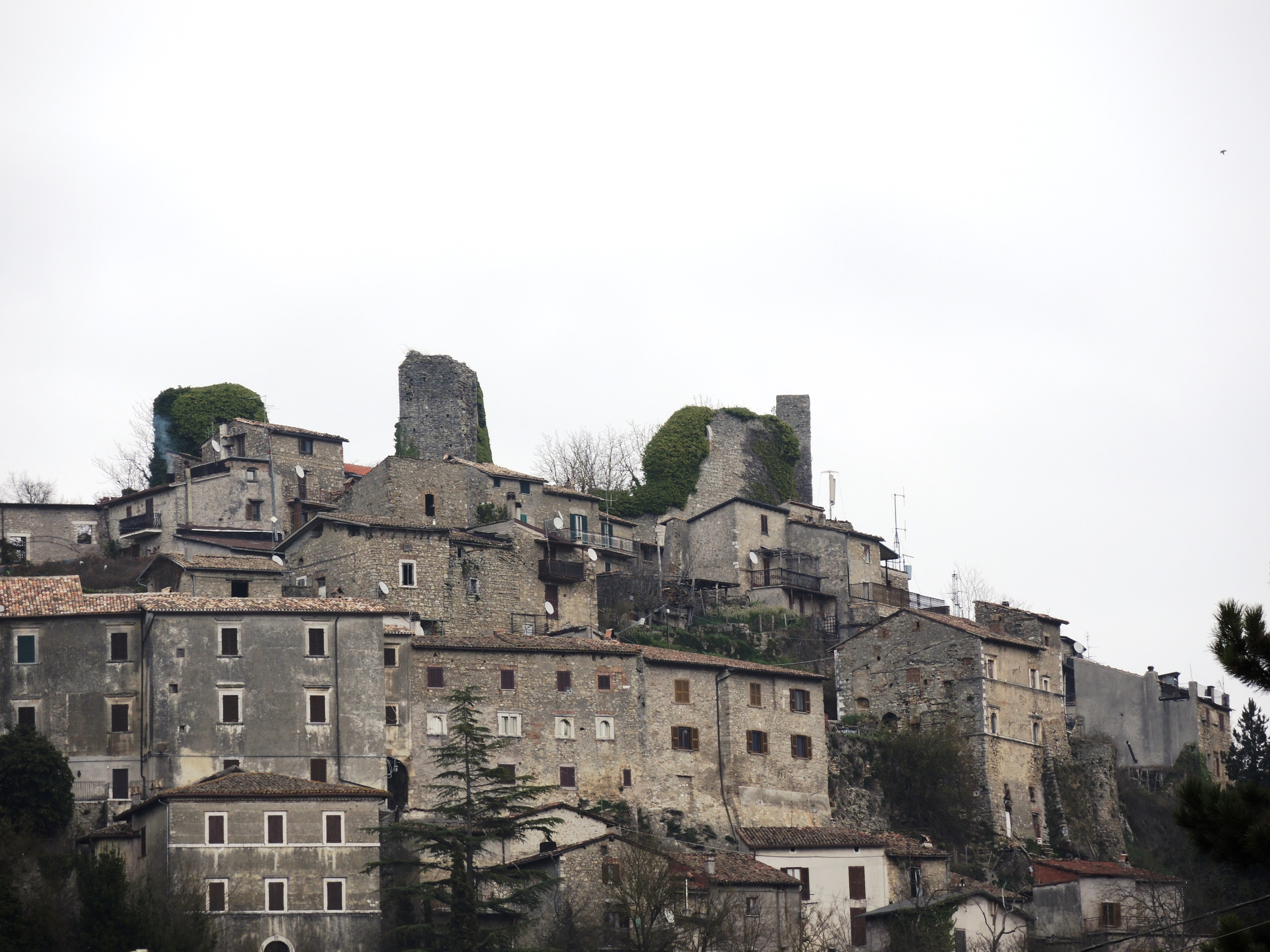
- Castle in Carsoli

Site information
- Type: Castle

Location

Site history
- Built: 11th century

Castello di Carsoli (Italian for Castle of Carsoli) is a medieval castle in Carsoli, Province of L'Aquila (Abruzzo), central Italy.

== History ==
The medieval village of Carsoli was built as a cluster of houses around the church of Santa Maria in Cellis not far from the remains of the Roman colony of Carseoli (or town of Carsioli), dating from the early fourth century BC, located in the neighboring town of Civita di Oricola. The village was destroyed by the Saracens in the tenth century, and between 996 and 1000, Count Rinaldo of the Marsi accounts initially built on Sant'Angelo hill a lookout tower, which was then subject to expansions with the construction of walls according to the castle-yard layout, the latest being the renovation of Anjou in 1293.

The territory of Carsoli and the Santa Maria church in Cellis were donated by Count Rainaldo the monastery of Subiaco. Later the castle was owned by Albe accounts, then of Tagliacozzo barons, then by the Orsini and Colonna until 1806, the subversion of feudalism

== Architecture ==
The plan of the castle is in the shape of a "L", with strong walls. The interior has been lost due to bad storage conditions in past centuries. A large watch tower survives.
