= Lucius Valerius Potitus (consul 483 BC) =

5th century BC Roman senator, consul and general

Lucius Valerius Potitus was a Roman politician and general in the beginning of the Roman Republic. He was the son of Marcus Valerius Volusus, who was consul in 505 BC. He held the office of quaestor parricidii in 485 BC in connection with the trial and execution of Spurius Cassius Vecellinus. His role in the trial of Cassius made Valerius unpopular with the plebs, and yet the Roman Senate succeeded in having Valerius elected consul in 483 BC and again in 470 BC.

According to Livy, during Valerius' first consulship in 483 BC the tribunes continued their attempts to increase their powers, but were at that time successfully resisted by the Roman Senate. In his second consulship in 470 BC Valerius led Roman troops against the Aequi. He unsuccessfully attempted to lead an assault on the Aequian army camp, and instead ravaged the Aequian territory.

In 464 BC there were hostilities with the Aequi again and as both consuls were absent from Rome conducting the war, a justitium was declared. Valerius was appointed praefectus urbi and was left in charge of defending the city.

== See also ==
- Valeria gens

Political offices
Preceded by Lucius Aemilius Mamercus; Caeso Fabius Vibulanus	Consul of the Roman Republic with Marcus Fabius Vibulanus; 483 BC	Succeeded by Quintus Fabius Vibulanus II; Gaius Julius Iulus (consul 482 BC)
Preceded by Appius Claudius Sabinus Regillensis (consul 471 BC); Titus Quinctius Capitolinus Barbatus	Consul of the Roman Republic with Tiberius Aemilius Mamercinus (consul 467 BC); 470 BC	Succeeded by Titus Numicius Priscus; Aulus Verginius Tricostus Caeliomontanus (consul 469 BC)
