= Titus Numicius Priscus =

Roman politician, consul in 469 BC

Consul of the Roman Republic
- In office 1 August 469 BC – 31 July 468 BC Serving with Aulus Verginius Tricostus Caeliomontanus (consul 469 BC)
- Preceded by: Tiberius Aemilius Mamercinus, Lucius Valerius Potitus (consul in 483 and 470 BC)
- Succeeded by: Titus Quinctius Capitolinus Barbatus, Quintus Servilius Priscus Structus (consul 468 BC)

Personal details
- Born: Unknown; Ancient Rome
- Died: Unknown; Ancient Rome

Titus Numicius Priscus was a Roman politician active in the fifth century BC and was consul in 469 BC.

== Family ==
The Numicii were a plebeian family in Rome. He was the only member of the family to achieve the consulship. Diodorus Siculus gave him the name "Minucius" in the place of "Numicius".

== Biography ==
In 469 BC, he was elected consul with Aulus Verginius Caeliomontanus as his colleague. Numicius was given responsibility for leading an army against the Volsci, after they had invaded Roman territory and began burning Roman country estates. The Volscian forces left the Roman territory, but Numicius pursued them, defeated the Volscian army in an initial engagement, then when the Volscian forces took shelter in Antium, Numicius captured the neighbouring port town of Ceno. He made inventory of their livestock, slaves, and other goods like plunder. Priscus then regrouped with Tricostus to plunder the Sabine country in reprisal for a raid by the Sabines in Roman territory.

== Bibliography ==
=== Primary sources ===
- Dionysius of Halicarnassus, Roman Antiquities, Book IX
- Livy, The History of Rome, Book II

=== Secondary sources ===
- Broughton, Thomas Robert Shannon (1951), The Magistrates of the Roman Republic, Philological Monograph No. 15, New York: American Philological Association, ISBN 0-89130-811-3

Political offices
Preceded by Tiberius Aemilius Mamercinus; Lucius Valerius Potitus Publicola	Consul of the Roman Republic with Aulus Verginius Caeliomontanus; 469 BC	Succeeded by Titus Quinctius Capitolinus Barbatus II; Quintus Servilius Priscus Structus
