= Aulus Verginius Tricostus Caeliomontanus (consul 469 BC) =

Roman politician, consul in 469 BC

Consul of the Roman Republic
- In office 1 August 469 BC – 31 July 468 BC Serving with Titus Numicius Priscus
- Preceded by: Tiberius Aemilius Mamercinus, Lucius Valerius Potitus (consul in 483 and 470 BC)
- Succeeded by: Titus Quinctius Capitolinus Barbatus, Quintus Servilius Priscus Structus (consul 468 BC)

Personal details
- Born: Unknown; Ancient Rome
- Died: Unknown; Ancient Rome

Aulus Verginius Tricostus Caeliomontanus was a Roman politician active in the fifth century BC and was consul in 469 BC.

== Family ==
He was the son of Aulus Verginius Tricostus Caeliomontanus, consul in 494 BC, and possibly the father of Titus Verginius Tricostus Caeliomontanus (consul 448 BC), consul in 448 BC. Alternatively, Titus might have been the son of Tricostus's brother Spurius Verginius Tricostus Caeliomontanus, consul in 456 BC. Dionysius of Halicarnassus reports his cognomen as Nomentanus but the inscription on the Fasti Capitolini more closely resembles the name Caeliomontanus.

== Biography ==
In 469 BC, he was consul with Titus Numicius Priscus as his colleague. At the beginning of his term, they each led separate campaigns against the Aequi and the Volsci who had both been setting fire to farmlands around Rome. Tricostus attacked the Aequi but faced difficulties, whereas Priscus fought the Volsci and captured Caenon, the port of Antium, which was the capital of the Volsci. He regrouped with Priscus in order to pillage the Sabine countryside in retaliation for a raid by the Sabines on Roman territory.

Two years later, in 467 BC, after having taken Antium from the Volsci, the Romans had established a colony there. Tricostus was, along with Titus Quinctius Capitolinus Barbatus and Publius Furius Medullinus Fusus, one of the three triumvirs (the triumviri agro dando) in charge of partitioning and distributing the lands of Antium to the colonists.

He is possibly the same person as the legate who served under the consul Titus Romilius Rocus Vaticanus against the Aequi in 455 BC.

== Bibliography ==
=== Primary sources ===
- Dionysius of Halicarnassus, Roman Antiquities, Book IX
- Livy, The History of Rome, Books II-III

=== Secondary sources ===
- Broughton, Thomas Robert Shannon (1951), The Magistrates of the Roman Republic, Philological Monograph No. 15, New York: American Philological Association, ISBN 0-89130-811-3

Political offices
Preceded by Tiberius Aemilius Mamercinus; Lucius Valerius Potitus Publicola	Consul of the Roman Republic with Titus Numicius Priscus; 469 B.C.	Succeeded by Titus Quinctius Capitolinus Barbatus II; Quintus Servilius Priscus Structus
