= Lucius Papirius Mugillanus (consul 444 BC) =

Roman statesman and consul in 444 BC

Lucius Papirius Mugilanus was a Roman politician and the suffect consul in 444 BC along with Lucius Sempronius Atratinus. The consulship was mostly peaceful, including renewing a treaty with Ardea.

== Consul ==
Lucius Papirius Mugilanus and Lucius Sempronius Atratinus were both elected consul in 444 BC after the three consular tribunes, Aulus Sempronius Atratinus, Lucius Atilius Luscus and Titus Cloelius Siculus were forced to abdicate. During their tenure, the consuls extended their treaty with Ardea. According to Livy this is the only reason why we know that they were consuls for that year, because they have not been found in other ancient text.

== Censor ==
The year after their consulship both he, and his consular colleague, Sempronius, were elected as the first censors. The magistracy was created as no census had been held for seventeen years and to free the consuls (who previously had held the census) for military duties. The authenticity of this office is doubted by some modern scholars.
