= Lucius Sempronius Atratinus (consul 444 BC) =

5th century BC Roman consul and censor

Lucius Sempronius Atratinus was a Roman politician and the suffect consul in 444 BC along with Lucius Papirius Mugillanus. The consulship was mostly peaceful, including renewing treaty with Ardea.

== Family ==
Lucius Sempronius Atratinus belonged to the gens Sempronia. His father is probably Aulus Sempronius Atratinus, consul in 497 BC. The consular tribune Lucius replaced in 444, Aulus Sempronius Atratinus, was most likely his brother. Filiations indicate that he had a son, Aulus Sempronius Atratinus, consular tribune in 425.

== Consul ==
Lucius Sempronius Atratinus and Lucius Papirius Mugillanus were both elected consul in 444 BC after the three consular tribunes, Aulus Sempronius Atratinus, Lucius Atilius Luscus and Titus Cloelius Siculus were forced to abdicate because of flaws in the auspices performed during their election. During their tenure, the consuls extended their treaty with Ardea. According to Livy this is the only reason why we know that they were consuls for that year, because they have not been found in other ancient text.

== Censor ==
The year after their consulship both he and his consular colleague, Papirius, were elected as the first censors. The magistracy was created as no census had been held for seventeen years and to free the consuls (who previously had held the census) for military duties. The authenticity of this office is doubted by some modern scholars.

== Bibliography ==
=== Ancient sources ===
- Marcus Tullius Cicero, Epistulae ad Familiares.
- Dionysius of Halicarnassus, Romaike Archaiologia (Roman Antiquities).
- Livy, Ab Urbe Condita (English translation by Rev. Canon Roberts on Wikisource).

=== Modern sources ===
- T. Robert S. Broughton, The Magistrates of the Roman Republic, American Philological Association, 1951–1952.
