= Gaius Curtius Philo =

Roman senator

Gaius Curiatius Philo or Chilo (fl. c. 445 BC) was putatively one of the two Roman consuls in 445 BC, during the early Republic. According to the historian Livy, both he and his colleague in office, Marcus Genucius, unsuccessfully opposed the law of the tribune Gaius Canuleius which allowed intermarriage between patricians and plebeians. He then presided over the elections of the first ever consular tribunes, only to have them invalidated by committing a mistake in the taking of the auspices.

The authenticity of both Curiatius and his colleague, Genucius, has been doubted. The sources exhibit considerable confusion with regards to Curiatius's name. Gaius most frequently appears as his first name, while variants like Publius and Titus are probably copyist errors, and, in the case of "Agrippa" (given by Diodorus of Sicily), a confusion with the previous year's consul, Agrippa Furius. The oldest sources, as reported by Livy (in turn probably following Licinius Macer) and Cassiodorus, seem to have preserved his family name as "Curiatius", but most later authors rendered it as "Curtius", a name borne by no other Republican-era consul. Finally, Curiatius's surname is found as Philo in the Chronograph of 354 and Chilo (Χίλων Chilon) in Diodorus. If the name Curiatius is correct, he may be regarded as a brother of Publius Curiatius, consul in 453 BC and decemvir in 451 BC.

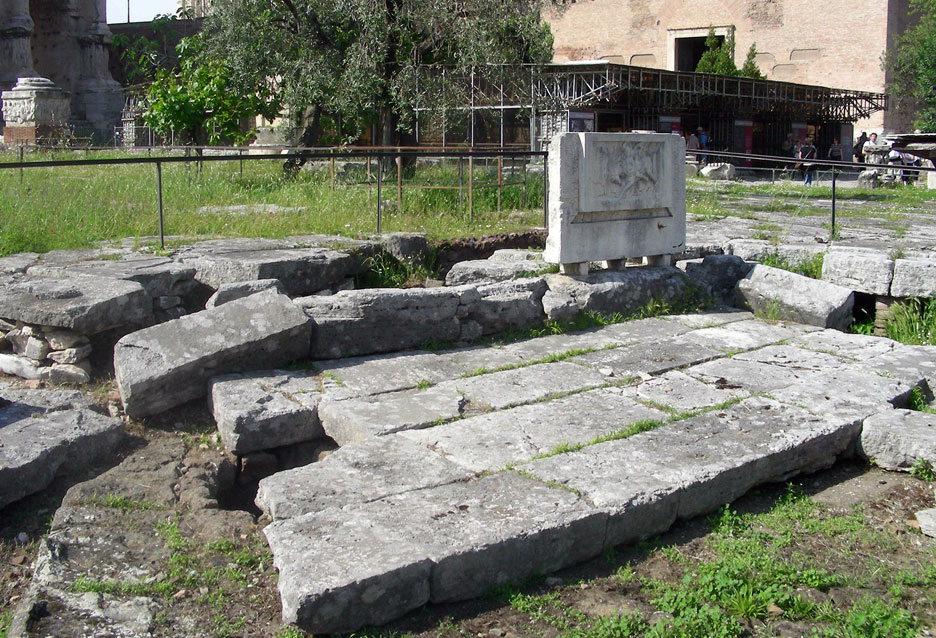
The Lacus Curtius on the Roman Forum, which name might derive from that of Curiatius

The antiquarian Varro suggested that Curiatius (Curtius) gave his name to the Lacus Curtius, a holy site on the Roman Forum. After lightning had struck the site, the Senate decreed that the area be fenced, which was done by Curiatius as consul. This story is one of the three found in ancient sources explaining the origin of the name, and the only one mentioning Curiatius.

Preceded by Titus Quinctius IV; Agrippa Furius	Roman consul 445 BC; With: Marcus Genucius	Succeeded by Aulus Sempronius; Lucius Atilius; Titus Cloelius as consular tribunes
