= Spurius Furius Medullinus Fusus (consul 464 BC) =

Roman politician and consul (died 453 BC)

Consul of the Roman Republic
- In office 1 August 464 BC – 31 July 463 BC Serving with Aulus Postumius Albus Regillensis (consul 464 BC)
- Preceded by: Quintus Fabius Vibulanus, Titus Quinctius Capitolinus Barbatus
- Succeeded by: Publius Servilius Priscus Structus (consul 463 BC), Lucius Aebutius Helva
- In office 1 August 453 BC – 453 BC Serving with Publius Curiatius Fistus Trigeminus
- Preceded by: Publius Curiatius Fistus Trigeminus, Sextus Quinctilius Varus
- Succeeded by: Titus Menenius Lanatus (consul 452 BC), Publius Sestius Capitolinus Vaticanus

Personal details
- Born: Unknown Ancient Rome
- Died: 453 BC Ancient Rome

Spurius Furius Medullinus Fusus (died 453 BC) was a Roman politician in the 5th century BC, and was consul in 464 BC, and consul suffect in 453 BC.

== Family ==
Medullinus was the brother of Publius Furius Medullinus Fusus, consul in 472 BC. The cognomina Medullinus Fusus has been reconstructed from multiple sources. Dionysius of Halicarnassus gives the praenomen Servius in place of Spurius. (Note: Dionysius of Halicarnassus, Roman Antiquities, IX. 63.2) Medullinus was the father of Lucius Furius Medullinus (military tribune with consular power in 432, 425, and 420 BC).

== Biography ==
In 464 BC, he was elected consul with Aulus Postumius Albus Regillensis. The two consuls led separate campaigns against the Aequi, Medullinus in Hernician territory. (Note: Dionysius of Halicarnassus, Roman Antiquities, IX. 62-66) In an initial battle the Aequi were victorious, and the Roman forces led by Furius were besieged in their camp. Later Furius led his troops in a sortie. They burst forth from their besieged camp and attacked the Aequi. The Roman attack initially succeeded, however the consul's brother Publius, (who had been consul in 472 BC and was serving as a legatus under his brother's command) led his forces too far from the main Roman force, and was cut off and killed. This led the consul to pursue him, and Spurius Furius himself was wounded, and only just rescued from the enemy. The Aequi besieged the Romans in their camp once again, and displayed the head of the consul's brother. But then the proconsul Titus Quinctius Capitolinus Barbatus arrived with Latin and Hernican forces, and attacked the Aequian army. The besieged Roman army again broke forth from the camp, and the Aequian army was soundly defeated. The Roman forces led by Quinctius and Furius then assisted the other consul Postumius in driving a separate Aequian force from Roman territory.

In 453 BC a pestilence ravaged Rome. According to Dionysius of Halicarnassus, a Spurius Fusus (probably the consul of 464 BC), was made consul suffect to replace the consul Sextus Quinctilius Varus, who died from the pestilence. (Note: Dionysius of Halicarnassus, Roman Antiquities, X. 53.3) (Note: Livy, Roman History, 3.32.4) Medullinus also died of the pestilence later that year. (Note: Dionysius of Halicarnassus, Roman Antiquities, X. 53)

== Bibliography ==
=== Ancient authors ===
- Dionysius of Halicarnassus in Romaike Archaiologia books 9 and 10.
- Titus Livius in Roman History book 3.

=== Modern authors ===
- Broughton, Thomas Robert Shannon (1951), The Magistrates of the Roman Republic, Philological Monograph No. 15, New York: American Philological Association, ISBN 0-89130-811-3

Political offices
Preceded by Quintus Fabius Vibulanus II; Titus Quinctius Capitolinus Barbatus III	Consul of the Roman Republic with Aulus Postumius Albus Regillensis; 464 BC	Succeeded by Publius Servilius Priscus Structus (consul 463 BC); Lucius Aebutius Helva
Preceded by Publius Curiatius Fistus Trigeminus; Sextus Quinctilius Varus	Consul suffect of the Roman Republic with Publius Curiatius Fistus Trigeminus; 453 BC	Succeeded by Titus Menenius Lanatus; Publius Sestius Capitolinus Vaticanus
