= Gaius Canuleius =

5th-century BC Roman tribune

Gaius Canuleius, according to Livy book 4, was a tribune of the plebs in 445 BC. He introduced a bill proposing that intermarriage between patricians and plebeians be allowed. As well, with his fellow tribunes he proposed another bill allowing one of the two annually elected consuls to be a plebeian.

Despite fierce opposition from the patricians, his laws were eventually passed when the plebeians went on a military strike, refusing to defend the city against its attacking neighbors. That law, the Lex Canuleia, bears his name.

The accuracy of Livy's description of Canuleius' tribunate and the Struggle of the Orders in which his laws played a major part is doubted by some modern scholars.

== See also ==
- Canuleia gens
- Twelve Tables
- Conflict of the Orders
- Roman Republic
