= Spurius Licinius =

Roman tribune of the plebs in 481 BC

Spurius Licinius was a tribune in ancient Rome in 481 BC.

He sought to promote a proposed agrarian law by encouraging the plebs to refuse to enrol for military service. However, in the face of foreign aggression, Licinius' suggestions became unpopular, and both the consuls and the other tribunes argued against Licinius, with the result that enrolment for military service was not hampered.

== See also ==
- Licinia (gens)
