= Justitium =

Suspension of normal civic business during an emergency

Justitium (derived from the Latin term Juris statio) is a concept of Roman law, equivalent to the declaration of the state of emergency. Some scholars also refer to it as a state of exception, stemming from a state of necessity. It involved the suspension of civil business, typically including the courts, the treasury and the Senate and was ordered by the Roman higher magistrates. It was usually declared following a sovereign's death, during the troubled period of interregnum, but also in case of invasions. However, in this last case, it was not as much the physical danger of invasion that justified the instauration of a state of exception, as the consequences that the news of the invasion had in Rome; for example, justitium was proclaimed at the news of Hannibal's attacks. The earliest recorded occasion of justitium being invoked was for the same reason, when in 465 BC panic gripped the city due to a mistaken belief of imminent invasion by the Aequi.

According to Giorgio Agamben, justitium progressively came to mean, after the Roman Republic, the public mourning of the sovereign: a sort of privatization or diversion of the danger threatening the polis, as the sovereign claimed for himself the auctoritas, or authority, necessary to the rule of law. In his conceptualization, it is a period where the law is indefinitely suspended without being abrogated for the purpose of generating an "anomic space in which what is at stake is a force of law without law".

== See also ==
- Martial law
- Roman emergency decrees
- Giorgio Agamben
- Interregnum
