= Publius Furius Medullinus Fusus =

Roman politician and consul (died 464 BC)

Consul of the Roman Republic
- In office 1 August 472 BC – 31 July 471 BC
- Preceded by: Vopiscus Julius Iulus, Lucius Aemilius Mamercus
- Succeeded by: Titus Quinctius Capitolinus Barbatus, Appius Claudius Sabinus Regillensis (consul 471 BC)

Personal details
- Born: Unknown; Ancient Rome
- Died: 464 BC; Ancient Rome

Publius Furius Medullinus Fusus (died 464 BC) was a Roman politician during the 5th century BC, and was consul in 472 BC.

== Family ==
He was a member of the gens Furia, and was the brother of Spurius Furius Medullinus Fusus (consul 464 BC).

== Biography ==
=== Consulship ===
In 472 BC he was elected consul with Lucius Pinarius Mamercinus Rufus. During their consulship, tribune of the plebs Volero Publilius proposed a law (Rogato Publilia) that plebeian tribunes should be elected by the Tribal Assembly; Volero Pubilius proposed this new system so that patricians and their clients would be excluded from the voting, and thus they would lose their influence on such decisions. (Note: Livy, Roman History, II. 56) (Note: Dionysius of Halicarnassus, Roman Antiquities, IX. 40-42)

During his consulship a Vestal named either Orbinia or Sunia was put to death for the crime of incestum (sexual misconduct). The Vestals were expected to remain virgins; if a woman had lost her virginity, it was sacrilege for her to tend the sacred hearth of Vesta. (Note: Dionysius of Halicarnassus, Roman Antiquities, IX. 40.3-4)

According to Varro, the "Lex Pinaria Furia of the intercalary month" is ascribed to Furius and Pinarius. (Note: Macrobius, Saturnalia, I. 13.21) It mentions the method by which the dispenser of days could add additional days to the calendar, based on the lunar cycle.

=== Late career ===
In 467 BC, after taking the Volscian maritime city of Antium the preceding year, the Romans had founded a colony there. Furius was appointed one of three commissioners (Triumviri agro dando) together with Titus Quinctius Capitolinus Barbatus and Aulus Verginius Tricostus Caeliomontanus. They were charged with dividing and distributing the lands of the colony among the first colonists. (Note: Livy, Roman History, III. 1) (Note: Dionysius of Halicarnassus, Roman Antiquities, IX. 59)

In 464 BC, he was given command as a legatus under his brother Spurius Furius Medullinus Fusus, then consul, in a war against the Aequi. The Romans were trapped in their camp. During a sortie Publius led his troops too far from the main Roman force, and was cut off and killed. Spurius sought to help his brother, but was wounded in the attempt. Publius' head was later displayed by the Aequi on a spear. (Note: Livy, Roman History, III. 5.6-11) (Note: Dionysius of Halicarnassus, Roman Antiquities, IX. 63.5-6)

== Bibliography ==
=== Ancient authors ===
- Dionysius of Halicarnassus in Romaike Archaiologia book 9
- Titus Livius in Roman History book 2.

=== Modern authors ===
- Broughton, Thomas Robert Shannon (1951), The Magistrates of the Roman Republic, Philological Monograph No. 15, New York: American Philological Association, ISBN 0-89130-811-3
- King, Richard Jackson (2006), Desiring Rome: Male Subjectivity and Reading Ovid's Fasti, Ohio State University Press, ISBN 0-8142-1020-1

Political offices
Preceded by Vopiscus Julius Iulus, and Lucius Aemilius Mamercus III	Consul of the Roman Republic; 472 BC with Lucius Pinarius Mamercinus Rufus	Succeeded by Titus Quinctius Capitolinus Barbatus, and Appius Claudius Sabinus
