= Marcus Genucius Augurinus =

Roman statesman of the 5th century BCE

Marcus Genucius Augurinus L. f. L. n. (or "Marcus Genucius Augurinus, son of Lucius, grandson of Lucius", see Roman filiation), brother of Titus Genucius Augurinus, was a statesman of the Genucia gens of ancient Rome who lived in the 5th century BCE.

Augurinus was consul in 445 BCE, the year in which the office of consular tribune was instituted. He and his consular colleague Gaius Curtius Philo opposed the lex Canuleia, which aimed to establish conubium (that is, the right to marry) between the patricians and plebeians. However they failed, and the law carried.

After that law was passed, Marcus consulted with his brother, Titus, on ways to resolve the Conflict of the Orders, although some accused them of carrying on the business of the state in secret.
