= List of Roman consuls =

This is a list of consuls known to have held office, from the beginning of the Roman Republic to the latest use of the title in Imperial times, together with those magistrates of the Republic who were appointed in place of consuls, or who superseded consular authority for a limited period.

== Background ==
=== Republican consuls ===
From the establishment of the Republic to the time of Augustus, the consuls were the chief magistrates of the Roman state. Traditionally, two were simultaneously appointed for a year-long term, so that the executive power of the state was not vested in a single individual, as it had been under the kings. As other ancient societies dated historical events according to the reigns of their kings, it became customary at Rome to date events by the names of the consuls in office when the events occurred, rather than (for instance) by counting the number of years since the foundation of the city, although that method could also be used. If a consul died during his year of office, another was elected to replace him. Although his imperium was the same as his predecessor's, he was termed consul suffectus, in order to distinguish him from the consul ordinarius whom he replaced; but the eponymous magistrates for each year were normally the consules ordinarii.

Because of this method of dating events, it was important to keep records of each year's eponymous magistrates. Many such lists have survived, either in the form of monumental inscriptions, conventionally referred to as fasti, or indirectly through the ancient historians, who had access to linen rolls recording the names of magistrates. Although these lists account for the entire period of the Republic, and most of Imperial times, there are discrepancies due to gaps and disagreements between different sources. Many of these no doubt arose as copying errors, especially those that involved the substitution of a familiar name for a less common one. Others may represent later attempts to edit the lists in order to explain deficiencies in the record, to reconcile conflicting traditions, or to ascribe particular actions or events to the time of a particular individual.

=== Other magistrates included ===
Occasionally, the authority of the consuls was temporarily superseded by the appointment of a dictator, who held greater imperium than that of the consuls. By tradition, these dictators laid down their office upon the completion of the task for which they were nominated, or after a maximum period of six months, and did not continue in office longer than the year for which the nominating consul had been elected. However, in four years at the end of the fourth century BC, dictators are said to have continued in office in the year following their nomination, in place of consuls. Modern scholars are skeptical of these years, which might be due to later editing of the lists of magistrates in order to fill a gap. All known dictators have been included in this table.

Two other types of magistrates are listed during the period of the Republic. In the year 451 BC, a board of ten men, known as decemviri, or decemvirs, was appointed in place of the consuls in order to draw up the tables of Roman law, in a sense establishing the Roman constitution. According to tradition, a second college of decemvirs was appointed for the next year, and these continued in office illegally into 449, until they were overthrown in a popular revolt, and the consulship was reinstated.

Among the disputes which the decemvirs failed to resolve was the relationship between the patricians, Rome's hereditary aristocracy, and the plebeians, or common citizens. Although it has been argued that some of the consuls prior to the Decemvirate may have been plebeians, the office was definitely closed to them in the second half of the fifth century BC. To prevent open hostility between the two orders, the office of military tribune with consular power, or "consular tribune", was established. In place of patrician consuls, the people could elect a number of military tribunes, who might be either patrician or plebeian.

According to Livy, this compromise held until 376 BC, when two of the tribunes of the plebs, Gaius Licinius Calvus Stolo and Lucius Sextius Lateranus, blocked the election of any magistrates for the following year, unless the senate would agree to place a law before the people opening the consulship to the plebeians, and effecting other important reforms. The senate refused, and the tribunes continued to prevent the election of magistrates for several years until the senate capitulated, and the lex Licinia Sextia was passed, leading to the election of the first plebeian consul in 367. Other accounts of this event are inconsistent, and current scholarly opinion is that the duration of the period without magistrates may have been exaggerated, or even invented to fill a gap in the record; nevertheless Roman tradition unanimously holds that Licinius and Sextius were able to open the consulship to the plebeians.

=== Consulship in imperial times ===
In Imperial times the consulship became the senior administrative office under the emperors, who frequently assumed the title of consul themselves, and appointed other consuls at will. The consulship was often bestowed as a political favour, or a reward for faithful service. Because there could only be two consuls at once, the emperors frequently appointed several sets of suffecti sequentially in the course of a year; holding the consulship for an entire year became a special honour. As the office lost much of its executive authority, and the number of consuls appointed for short and often irregular periods increased, surviving lists from Imperial times are often incomplete, and have been reconstructed from many sources, not always with much certainty. In many cases it is stated that a particular person had been consul, but the exact time cannot be firmly established. As an institution, the consulship survived the abdication of the last emperor of the West, and for a time consuls continued to be appointed, one representing the Eastern Roman Empire, and the other the Western, even as the Western Empire dissolved as a political entity. The last consuls appointed represented only the Eastern Empire, until finally the title became the sole province of the Emperor, who might or might not assume it upon taking office.

=== Chronology ===
For the early Republic, this article observes the Varronian chronology, established by the historian Marcus Terentius Varro, who calculated that Rome was founded in what is now called the year 753 BC (the founding of the city was traditionally observed on the Palilia, a festival occurring on April 21). This becomes the year 1 ab urbe condita, or AUC. The Republic was established in AUC 245, or 509 BC. Although other ancient historians gave different years and modern scholarship knows Varro to have been mistaken in his calculations by at least a few years, Varro's chronology was the most widely accepted in antiquity, in official use for various purposes by at least the reign of Claudius. Its use by Censorinus brought it to the attention of Joseph Scaliger, who helped popularize it in modern times.

For Imperial times, the dates of the consules ordinarii are far more certain than those of the suffecti, who were not recorded with the same attention as the eponymous magistrates. Their identification and dating is far more controversial, and despite the efforts of generations of scholars, gaps in coverage remain. Known consules suffecti are shown with their known (or reconstructed) dates of tenure, which normally varied from two to six months — although one suffect consul, Rosius Regulus, is known to have held the fasces for a single day, October 31, AD 69. Where neither consul is known or inferred for a portion of the year, their names are omitted for convenience; if one consul can be named, but his colleague is unknown, the unnamed colleague is listed as ignotus (unknown).

=== Consules prior and posterior ===
The consul named first in the lists was identified as consul prior, whereas the other was called consul posterior. The two consuls' authority was equal and their duties were shared on an alternating basis. There is evidence that, during the late Republic, the consul elected with the most votes became the consul prior, and the consul elected first also may have been the first in the year to hold fasces (take precedence), but the evidence is not conclusive. The surviving sources for the order of the consuls in the early Republic show some measure of conflict in just under half of the cases. Lily Ross Taylor argues that the emperor Augustus falsified some of the records in order to give prominence to several families, and that the order of consuls as reported by the historian Livy is the most reliable. Drummond disagrees: he argues that Livy himself switches the correct order at times for literary purposes, and that discrepant entries in the sources are most likely simply the result of negligence. Although there is probably one 'correct' order for all the consuls of the republic, or at least one underlying tradition reporting it, no surviving source seems to be more reliable than another to a significant extent.

When the emperor assumed the consulship, he was necessarily consul prior. This distinction continued until the fourth century AD, when the Empire was divided into a Western Roman Empire and an Eastern Roman Empire: the consuls who were appointed by the court in the Western Empire, which was sometimes at Rome, are commonly identified as the "Western consul", and those appointed by the court in the Eastern, usually Constantinople, the "Eastern consul". These designations were used until the end of the consulship in the sixth century.

=== Other lists of consuls ===
For a list of consuls whose year of office is uncertain or entirely unknown (usually suffecti, although some of the ordinarii in the breakaway Gallic Empire also lack dates), see the List of undated Roman consuls. For those individuals who were elected consul but never assumed the office due to death, disgrace, or any other reason, see List of Roman consuls designate.

== Key ==
=== Latin terms ===
- Imperator (abbreviated Imp.) = literally "commander"; originally an honorary title bestowed upon a general by his soldiers, the term later became part of the style of the emperors, and the word "emperor" is derived from it.
- suffectus (abbreviated suff.) = a substitute elected or appointed in place of a magistrate who died or resigned. Information is not available for all consules suffecti, and some may not be listed.
- ignotus = unknown. All consuls who can be assigned to a particular date, at least tentatively, are included in this table. If neither consul for a given period is known, they are entirely omitted; if one is known, and the other is not, the unknown colleague is referred to as ignotus.
- sine collega = without colleague. On a few occasions before the dissolution of the Western Empire, only one consul was appointed.
- post consulatum = after the (preceding) consulship. Used for gaps when no consuls were appointed for a period following the end of another consulship, or at least none are known to have been appointed.
- inter alios = among others.

=== Praenomina and their abbreviations ===
- A. = Aulus
- Agrippa (not abbreviated)
- Ap. = Appius
- C. = Gaius
- Cn. = Gnaeus
- D. = Decimus
- K. = Caeso
- L. = Lucius
- M. = Marcus
- M'. = Manius
- Mam. = Mamercus
- N. = Numerius
- Opet. = Opiter
- P. = Publius
- Postumus (not abbreviated)
- Proculus (not abbreviated)
- Q. = Quintus
- Ser. = Servius
- Sex. = Sextus
- Sp. = Spurius
- T. = Titus
- Ti. = Tiberius
- Vopiscus (not abbreviated)

=== Colors ===
- Consular tribunes
- Decemviri
- Dictators
- Emperor serving as consul
- Heir-apparent serving as consul

== Sixth century BC (509–501) ==
Unless otherwise indicated, the names and dates of the consuls between 509 and 31 BC are taken from Thomas Broughton's Magistrates of the Roman Republic.

Year		
509	L. Junius Brutus	L. Tarquinius Collatinus
suff.	Sp. Lucretius Tricipitinus	P. Valerius Poplicola
suff.	M. Horatius Pulvillus	
508	P. Valerius Poplicola II	T. Lucretius Tricipitinus
507	P. Valerius Poplicola III	M. Horatius Pulvillus II
506	Sp. Larcius	T. Herminius Aquilinus
505	M. Valerius Volusus	P. Postumius Tubertus
504	P. Valerius Poplicola IV	T. Lucretius Tricipitinus II
503	Agrippa Menenius Lanatus	P. Postumius Tubertus II
502	Opiter Verginius Tricostus	Sp. Cassius Vecellinus
501	Postumus Cominius Auruncus	T. Larcius

== Fifth century BC (500–401) ==
Year		
500	Ser. Sulpicius Camerinus Cornutus	M'. Tullius Longus
499	T. Aebutius Helva	C. Veturius Geminus Cicurinus
498	Q. Cloelius Siculus	T. Larcius II
497	A. Sempronius Atratinus	M. Minucius Augurinus
496	A. Postumius Albus Regillensis	T. Verginius Tricostus Caeliomontanus
495	Ap. Claudius Sabinus Inregillensis	P. Servilius Priscus Structus
494	A. Verginius Tricostus Caeliomontanus	T. Veturius Geminus Cicurinus
493	Postumus Cominius Auruncus II	Sp. Cassius Vecellinus II
492	T. Geganius Macerinus	P. Minucius Augurinus
491	M. Minucius Augurinus II	A. Sempronius Atratinus II
490	Q. Sulpicius Camerinus Cornutus	Sp. Larcius II
489	C. Julius Iullus	P. Pinarius Mamercinus Rufus
488	Sp. Nautius Rutilus	Sex. Furius
487	T. Sicinius (or Siccius) Sabinus	C. Aquillius Tuscus
486	Sp. Cassius Vecellinus III	Proculus Verginius Tricostus Rutilus
485	Q. Fabius Vibulanus	Ser. Cornelius Maluginensis
484	L. Aemilius Mamercus	K. Fabius Vibulanus
483	M. Fabius Vibulanus	L. Valerius Potitus
482	C. Julius Iullus	Q. Fabius Vibulanus II
481	K. Fabius Vibulanus II	Sp. Furius Fusus
480	M. Fabius Vibulanus II	Cn. Manlius Cincinnatus
479	K. Fabius Vibulanus III	T. Verginius Tricostus Rutilus
478	L. Aemilius Mamercus II	C. Servilius Structus Ahala
suff.		(Opiter Verginius? E)squilinus
477	C. (or M.) Horatius Pulvillus	T. Menenius Lanatus
476	A. Verginius Tricostus Rutilus	Sp. (or C.) Servilius Structus
475	P. Valerius Poplicola	C. Nautius Rutilus
474	L. Furius Medullinus	A. Manlius Vulso
473	L. Aemilius Mamercus III	Vopiscus Julius Iullus
472	L. Pinarius Mamercinus Rufus	P. Furius Medullinus Fusus
471	Ap. Claudius Crassus Inregillensis Sabinus	T. Quinctius Capitolinus Barbatus
470	L. Valerius Potitus II	Ti. Aemilius Mamercus
469	T. Numicius Priscus	A. Verginius Caeliomontanus
468	T. Quinctius Capitolinus Barbatus II	Q. Servilius Priscus
467	Ti. Aemilius Mamercus II	Q. Fabius Vibulanus
466	Q. Servilius Priscus II	Sp. Postumius Albinus Regillensis
465	Q. Fabius Vibulanus II	T. Quinctius Capitolinus Barbatus III
464	A. Postumius Albinus Regillensis	Sp. Furius Medullinus Fusus
463	P. Servilius Priscus	L. Aebutius Helva
462	L. Lucretius Tricipitinus	T. Veturius Geminus Cicurinus
461	P. Volumnius Amintinus Gallus	Ser. Sulpicius Camerinus Cornutus
460	P. Valerius Poplicola II	C. Claudius Inregillensis Sabinus
suff.	L. Quinctius Cincinnatus	
459	Q. Fabius Vibulanus III	L. Cornelius Maluginensis Uritinus
458	C. Nautius Rutilus II	(...) Carve(ntanus?)
suff.		L. Minucius Esquilinus Augurinus
457	C. (or M.) Horatius Pulvillus II	Q. Minucius Esquilinus (or L. Postumius)
456	M. Valerius Maximus Lactuca	Sp. Verginius Tricostus Caeliomontanus
455	T. Romilius Rocus Vaticanus	C. Veturius Cicurinus
454	Sp. Tarpeius Montanus Capitolinus	A. Aternius Varus Fontinalis
453	P. Curiatius Fistus Trigeminus	Sex. Quinctilius
suff.		Sp. Furius (Medullinus Fusus) II?)
452	T. Menenius Lanatus	P. Sestius Capitolinus Vaticanus
451	Ap. Claudius Crassus Inregillensis Sabinus II	T. Genucius (or Minucius) Augurinus
	First Decemvirate	
	Ap. Claudius Crassus Inregillensis Sabinus	T. Genucius (or Minucius) Augurinus
	T. Veturius Geminus Cicurinus	C. Julius Iullus
	A. Manlius Vulso	Ser. Sulpicius Camerinus Cornutus
	P. Sestius Capitolinus Vaticanus	P. Curiatius Fistus Trigeminus
	T. Romilius Rocus Vaticanus	Sp. Postumius Albus Regillensis
450	Second Decemvirate	
	Ap. Claudius Crassus Inregillensis Sabinus II	M. Cornelius Maluginensis
	M.(?) Sergius Esquilinus	L. Minucius Esquilinus Augurinus
	Q. Fabius Vibulanus	Q. Poetelius
	T. Antonius Merenda	K. Duillius Longus
	Sp. Oppius Cornicen	M'. Rabuleius
449	L. Valerius Poplicola Potitus	M. Horatius Turrinus Barbatus
448	Lars Herminius Coritinesanus	T. Verginius Tricostus Caeliomontanus
447	M. Geganius Macerinus	C. Julius Iullus
446	T. Quinctius Capitolinus Barbatus IV	Agrippa Furius Fusus
445	M. Genucius Augurinus	C. Curiatius Philo
444	Consular tribunes	
	A. Sempronius Atratinus	L. Atilius Luscus
	T. Cloelius Siculus	
suff.	L. Papirius Mugillanus	L. Sempronius Atratinus
443	M. Geganius Macerinus II	T. Quinctius Capitolinus Barbatus V
442	M. Fabius Vibulanus	Postumus Aebutius Helva Cornicen
441	C. Furius Pacilus Fusus	M'. Papirius Crassus
440	Proculus Geganius Macerinus	T. Menenius Lanatus II or L. Menenius Lanatus
439	Agrippa Menenius Lanatus	T. Quinctius Capitolinus Barbatus VI
438	Consular tribunes	
	Mam. Aemilius (Mamercinus?)	L. Quinctius Cincinnatus
	L. Julius Iullus	
437	M. Geganius Macerinus III	L. Sergius Fidenas
436	M. (or A.) Cornelius Maluginensis	L. Papirius Crassus
435	C. Julius Iullus II	(L. or Proculus) Verginius Tricostus
434	Consular tribunes(?)	
	M. Manlius Capitolinus	Q. Sulpicius Camerinus Praetextatus
	Ser. Cornelius Cossus	
433	Consular tribunes	
	M. Fabius Vibulanus	M. Foslius Flaccinator
	L. Sergius Fidenas	
432	Consular tribunes	
	L. Pinarius Mamercinus	L. Furius Medullinus
	Sp. Postumius Albus Regillensis	
431	T. Quinctius Poenus Cincinnatus	C. Julius Mento
430	C. (or L.) Papirius Crassus	L. Julius Iullus
429	Hostus Lucretius Tricipitinus	L. Sergius Fidenas II
428	A. Cornelius Cossus	T. Quinctius Poenus Cincinnatus II
427	C. Servilius Axilla	L. Papirius Mugillanus
426	Consular tribunes	
	C. Furius Pacilus Fusus	T. Quinctius Poenus Cincinnatus
	M. Postumius Albinus Regillensis	A. Cornelius Cossus
425	Consular tribunes	
	A. Sempronius Atratinus	L. Quinctius Cincinnatus II
	L. Furius Medullinus II	L. Horatius Barbatus
424	Consular tribunes	
	Ap. Claudius Crassus	Sp. Nautius Rutilus
	L. Sergius Fidenas II	Sex. Julius Iullus
423	C. Sempronius Atratinus	Q. Fabius Vibulanus
422	Consular tribunes	
	L. Manlius Capitolinus	Q. Antonius Merenda
	L. Papirius Mugillanus	
421	N. (or Cn.) Fabius Vibulanus	T. Quinctius Capitolinus Barbatus
420	Consular tribunes	
	Quinctius Cincinnatus	L. Furius Medullinus III
	M. Manlius Vulso	A. Sempronius Atratinus II
419	Consular tribunes	
	Agrippa Menenius Lanatus	P. Lucretius Tricipitinus
	Sp. Nautius Rutilus	C. Servilius Axilla
418	Consular tribunes	
	L. Sergius Fidenas III	M. Papirius Mugillanus
	C. Servilius Axilla II	
417	Consular tribunes	
	P. Lucretius Tricipitinus II	Agrippa Menenius Lanatus II
	C. Servilius Axilla III	Sp. Veturius Crassus
416	Consular tribunes	
	A. Sempronius Atratinus III	M. Papirius Mugillanus II
	Q. Fabius Vibulanus	Sp. Nautius Rutilus II
415	Consular tribunes	
	P. Cornelius Cossus	C. Valerius Potitus Volusus
	Q. Quinctius Cincinnatus	N. (or Cn.) Fabius Vibulanus
414	Consular tribunes	
	Cn. Cornelius Cossus	L. Valerius Potitus
	Q. Fabius Vibulanus II	P. Postumius Albinus Regillensis
413	(A. or M.) Cornelius Cossus	L. Furius Medullinus
412	Q. Fabius Vibulanus (?)Ambustus (II?)	C. Furius Pacilus
411	M. Papirius Mugillanus	Sp. (or C.) Nautius Rutilus
410	M'. Aemilius Mamercinus	C. Valerius Potitus Volusus
409	Cn. Cornelius Cossus	L. Furius Medullinus II
408	Consular tribunes	
	C. Julius Iullus	P. Cornelius Cossus
	C. Servilius Ahala	
407	Consular tribunes	
	L. Furius Medullinus	C. Valerius Potitus Volusus II
	N. (or Cn.) Fabius Vibulanus II	C. Servilius Ahala II
406	Consular tribunes	
	P. Cornelius Rutilus Cossus	Cn. Cornelius Cossus
	N. (or Cn.) Fabius Ambustus	L. Valerius Potitus II
405	Consular tribunes	
	T. Quinctius Capitolinus Barbatus	Q. Quinctius Cincinnatus II
	C. Julius Iullus II	A. Manlius Vulso Capitolinus
	L. Furius Medullinus II	M'. Aemilius Mamercinus
404	Consular tribunes	
	C. Valerius Potitus Volusus III	M'. Sergius Fidenas
	P. Cornelius Maluginensis	Cn. Cornelius Cossus II
	K. Fabius Ambustus	Sp. Nautius Rutilus III
403	Consular tribunes	
	M'. Aemilius Mamercinus II	L. Valerius Potitus III
	Ap. Claudius Crassus	M. Quinctilius Varus
	L. Julius Iullus	M. Furius Fusus
402	Consular tribunes	
	C. Servilius Ahala III	Q. Servilius Fidenas
	L. Verginius Tricostus Esquilinus	Q. Sulpicius Camerinus Cornutus
	A. Manlius Vulso Capitolinus II	M'. Sergius Fidenas II
401	Consular tribunes	
	L. Valerius Potitus IV	M. Furius Camillus
	M'. Aemilius Mamercinus III	Cn. Cornelius Cossus III
	K. Fabius Ambustus II	L. Julius Iullus

== Fourth century BC (400–301) ==
Year		
400	Consular tribunes	
	P. Licinius Calvus Esquilinus	P. Manlius Vulso
	L. Titinius Pansa Saccus	P. Maelius Capitolinus
	Sp. Furius Medullinus	L. Publilius Philo Vulscus
399	Consular tribunes	
	Cn. Genucius Augurinus	L. Atilius Priscus
	M. Pomponius Rufus	C. Duillius Longus
	M. Veturius Crassus Cicurinus	Volero Publilius Philo
398	Consular tribunes	
	L. Valerius Potitus V	M. Valerius Lactucinus Maximus
	M. Furius Camillus II	L. Furius Medullinus III
	Q. Servilius Fidenas II	Q. Sulpicius Camerinus Cornutus II
397	Consular tribunes	
	L. Julius Iullus II	L. Furius Medullinus IV
	L. Sergius Fidenas	A. Postumius Albinus Regillensis
	P. Cornelius Maluginensis	A. Manlius Vulso Capitolinus III
396	Consular tribunes	
	L. Titinius Pansa Saccus II	P. Licinius Calvus Esquilinus II
	P. Maelius Capitolinus II	Q. Manlius Vulso Capitolinus
	Cn. Genucius Augurinus II	L. Atilius Priscus II
395	Consular tribunes	
	P. Cornelius Cossus	P. Cornelius Scipio
	K. Fabius Ambustus III	L. Furius Medullinus V
	Q. Servilius Fidenas III	M. Valerius Lactucinus Maximus II
394	Consular tribunes	
	M. Furius Camillus III	L. Furius Medullinus VI
	C. Aemilius Mamercinus	L. Valerius Poplicola
	Sp. Postumius Albinus Regillensis	P. Cornelius (Maluginensis or Scipio or Cossus) II
393	L. Valerius Potitus (invalidated)	Cornelius Maluginensis (invalidated)
	L. Lucretius Tricipitinus Flavus	Ser. Sulpicius Camerinus
392	L. Valerius Potitus II	M. Manlius Capitolinus
391	Consular tribunes	
	L. Lucretius Tricipitinus Flavus	Ser. Sulpicius Camerinus
	L. Aemilius Mamercinus	L. Furius Medullinus VII
	Agrippa Furius Fusus	C. Aemilius Mamercinus II
390	Consular tribunes	
	Q. Sulpicius Longus	Q. Fabius Ambustus
	K. Fabius Ambustus IV	N. (or Cn.) Fabius Ambustus II
	Q. Servilius Fidenas IV	P. Cornelius Maluginensis II
389	Consular tribunes	
	L. Valerius Poplicola II	L. Verginius Tricostus (Esquilinus II?)
	P. Cornelius	A. Manlius Capitolinus
	L. Aemilius Mamercinus II	L. Postumius Albinus Regillensis
	(?) L. Papirius (Mugillanus?)	(?) M. Furius
388	Consular tribunes	
	T. Quinctius Cincinnatus Capitolinus	Q. Servilius Fidenas V
	L. Julius Iullus	L. Aquillius Corvus
	L. Lucretius Tricipitinus Flavus II	Ser. Sulpicius Rufus
387	Consular tribunes	
	L. Papirius Cursor	Cn. Sergius Fidenas Coxo
	L. Aemilius Mamercinus III	Licinus Menenius Lanatus
	L. Valerius Poplicola III	
386	Consular tribunes	
	M. Furius Camillus IV	Ser. Cornelius Maluginensis
	Q. Servilius Fidenas VI	L. Quinctius Cincinnatus
	L. Horatius Pulvillus	P. Valerius Potitus Poplicola
385	Consular tribunes	
	A. Manlius Capitolinus II	P. Cornelius
	T. Quinctius (Cincinnatus?) Capitolinus II	L. Quinctius Capitolinus
	L. Papirius Cursor II	Cn. Sergius Fidenas Coxo II
384	Consular tribunes	
	Ser. Cornelius Maluginensis II	P. Valerius Potitus Poplicola II
	M. Furius Camillus V	Ser. Sulpicius Rufus II
	C. (or L.) Papirius Crassus	T. Quinctius Cincinnatus Capitolinus (III?)
383	Consular tribunes	
	L. Valerius Poplicola IV	A. Manlius Capitolinus IV
	Ser. Sulpicius Rufus III	L. Lucretius Tricipitinus Flavus III
	L. Aemilius Mamercinus IV	M. Trebonius
382	Consular tribunes	
	Sp. Papirius Crassus	L. Papirius (Mugillanus?)
	Ser. Cornelius Maluginensis III	Q. Servilius Fidenas
	C. Sulpicius Camerinus	L. Aemilius Mamercinus V
381	Consular tribunes	
	M. Furius Camillus VI	A. Postumius Albinus Regillensis II
	L. Postumius Albinus Regillensis II	L. Furius Medullinus
	L. Lucretius Tricipitinus Flavus IV	M. Fabius Ambustus
380	Consular tribunes	
	L. Valerius Potitus Poplicola V	P. Valerius Potitus Poplicola III
	Ser. Cornelius Maluginensis IV	Licinus Menenius Lanatus II
	C. Sulpicius Peticus	L. Aemilius Mamercinus VI
	Cn. Sergius Fidenas Coxo III	Ti. Papirius Crassus
	L. Papirius Mugillanus II	
379	Consular tribunes	
	P. Manlius Capitolinus	Cn. Manlius Vulso
	L. Julius Iullus II	C. Sextilius
	M. Albinius	L. Antistius
	P. Trebonius	C. Erenucius
378	Consular tribunes	
	Sp. (or L.) Furius	Q. Servillius Fidenas II
	Licinus Menenius Lanatus III	P. Cloelius Siculus
	M. Horatius	L. Geganius Macerinus
377	Consular tribunes	
	L. Aemilius Mamercinus	P. Valerius Potitus Poplicola IV
	C. Veturius Crassus Cicurinus	Ser. Sulpicius (Rufus IV or Praetextatus)
	L. Quinctius Cincinnatus III	C. Quinctius Cincinnatus
376	Consular tribunes	
	L. Papirius (Mugillanus?) III	Licinus Menenius Lanatus IV
	Ser. Cornelius Maluginensis V	Ser. Sulpicius Praetextatus II
375 – 371	solitudo magistratuum According to Livy (6.35), the tribunes Gaius Licinius Stolo and Lucius Sextius introduced new laws known as the Lex Licinia Sextia, which provoked strong resistance from the patricians. Licinius Stolo and Sextius resorted to using the tribunican veto to prevent either consuls or consular tribunes from being elected. The actual length of this period is controversial, with primary sources stating it was one (Diodorus Siculus), five (Fasti Capitolini), or ten (Livy) years.	
370	Consular tribunes	
	L. Furius Medullinus II	A. Manlius Capitolinus V
	Ser. Sulpicius Praetextatus III	Ser. Cornelius Maluginensis VI
	P. Valerius Potitus Poplicola V	C. Valerius Potitus
369	Consular tribunes	
	Q. Servilius Fidenas III	C. Veturius Crassus Cicurinus II
	A. Cornelius Cossus	M. Cornelius Maluginensis
	Q. Quinctius (Cincinnatus?)	M. Fabius Ambustus II
368	Consular tribunes	
	T. Quinctius Cincinnatus Capitolinus	Ser. Cornelius Maluginensis VII
	Ser. Sulpicius Praetextatus IV	Sp. Servilius Structus
	L. Papirius Crassus	L. Veturius Crassus Cicurinus
367	Consular tribunes	
	A. Cornelius Cossus II	M. Cornelius Maluginensis II
	M. Geganius Macerinus	P. Manlius Capitolinus II
	L. Veturius Crassus Cicurinus II	P. Valerius Potitus Poplicola VI
366	L. Aemilius Mamercinus	L. Sextius Sextinus Lateranus
365	L. Genucius Aventinensis	Q. Servilius Ahala
364	C. Sulpicius Peticus	C. Licinius Calvus
363	Cn. Genucius Aventinensis	L. Aemilius Mamercinus II
362	Q. Servilius Ahala II	L. Genucius Aventinensis II
361	C. Licinius Stolo	C. Sulpicius Peticus II
360	M. Fabius Ambustus	C. Poetelius Libo Visolus
359	M. Popillius Laenas	Cn. Manlius Capitolinus Imperiosus
358	C. Fabius Ambustus	C. Plautius Proculus
357	C. Marcius Rutilus	Cn. Manlius Capitolinus (Imperiosus II?)
356	M. Fabius Ambustus II	M. Popillius Laenas II
355	C. Sulpicius Peticus III	M. Valerius Poplicola
354	M. Fabius Ambustus III	T. Quinctius Poenus Capitolinus Crispinus
353	C. Sulpicius Peticus IV	M. Valerius Poplicola II
352	P. Valerius Poplicola	C. Marcius Rutilus II
351	C. Sulpicius Peticus V	T. (or C. or K.) Quinctius Poenus (II?)
350	M. Popillius Laenas III	L. Cornelius Scipio
349	L. Furius Camillus	Ap. Claudius Crassus Inregillensis
348	M. Valerius Corvus	M. Popillius Laenas IV
347	C. Plautius Venno (or Venox)	T. Manlius Imperiosus Torquatus
346	M. Valerius Corvus II	C. Poetelius Libo Visolus II
345	M. Fabius Dorsuo	Ser. Sulpicius Camerinus Rufus
344	C. Marcius Rutilus III	T. Manlius Imperiosus Torquatus II
343	M. Valerius Corvus III	A. Cornelius Cossus Arvina
342	Q. Servilius Ahala III	C. Marcius Rutilus IV
341	C. Plautius Venno (or Venox) II	L. Aemilius Mamercinus Privernas
340	T. Manlius Imperiosus Torquatus III	P. Decius Mus
339	Ti. Aemilius Mamercinus	Q. Publilius Philo
338	L. Furius Camillus	C. Maenius
337	C. Sulpicius Longus	P. Aelius Paetus
336	L. Papirius Crassus	K. Duilius
335	M. Atilius Regulus Calenus	M. Valerius Corvus IV
334	Sp. Postumius Albinus (Caudinus)	T. Veturius Calvinus
333	Dictator: P. Cornelius Rufinus (fictitious year)	
332	Cn. Domitius Calvinus	A. Cornelius Cossus Arvina II
331	C. Valerius Potitus	M. Claudius Marcellus
330	L. Papirius Crassus II	L. Plautius Venno (or Venox)
329	L. Aemilius Mamercinus Privernas II	C. Plautius Decianus
328	Plautius	P. Cornelius (Scapula or Scipio Barbatus)
327	L. Cornelius Lentulus	Q. Publilius Philo II
326	C. Poetelius Libo Visolus III	L. Papirius Cursor
325	L. Furius Camillus II	D. Junius Brutus Scaeva
324	Dictator: L. Papirius Cursor (fictitious year)	
323	C. Sulpicius Longus II	Q. Aulius Cerretanus
322	Q. Fabius Maximus Rullianus	L. Fulvius Curvus
321	T. Veturius Calvinus II	Sp. Postumius Albinus Caudinus II
320	Q. Publilius Philo III	L. Papirius Cursor II
319	L. Papirius Cursor III	Q. Aulius Cerretanus II
318	M. Folius Flaccinator	L. Plautius Venno (or Venox)
317	C. Junius Bubulcus Brutus	Q. Aemilius Barbula
316	Sp. Nautius Rutilus	M. Popillius Laenas
315	L. Papirius Cursor IV	Q. Publilius Philo IV
314	M. Poetelius Libo	C. Sulpicius Longus III
313	L. Papirius Cursor V	C. Junius Bubulcus Brutus II
312	M. Valerius Maximus Corvus	P. Decius Mus
311	C. Junius Bubulcus Brutus III	Q. Aemilius Barbula II
310	Q. Fabius Maximus Rullianus II	C. Marcius Rutilus (Censorinus)
309	Dictator: L. Papirius Cursor (fictitious year)	
308	P. Decius Mus II	Q. Fabius Maximus Rullianus III
307	Ap. Claudius Caecus	L. Volumnius Flamma Violens
306	Q. Marcius Tremulus	P. Cornelius Arvina
305	L. Postumius Megellus	Ti. Minucius Augurinus
suff.		M. Fulvius Curvus Paetinus
304	P. Sempronius Sophus	P. Sulpicius Saverrius
303	Ser. Cornelius Lentulus	L. Genucius Aventinensis
302	M. Livius Denter	M. Aemilius Paullus
301	Dictator: M. Valerius Maximus Corvus (fictitious year)	

== Third century BC (300–201) ==
Year		
300	M. Valerius Corvus V	Q. Appuleius Pansa
299	M. Fulvius Paetinus	T. Manlius Torquatus
suff.		M. Valerius Corvus VI
298	L. Cornelius Scipio Barbatus	Cn. Fulvius Maximus Centumalus
297	Q. Fabius Maximus Rullianus IV	P. Decius Mus III
296	L. Volumnius Flamma Violens II	Ap. Claudius Caecus II
295	Q. Fabius Maximus Rullianus V	P. Decius Mus IV
294	L. Postumius Megellus II	M. Atilius Regulus
293	L. Papirius Cursor	Sp. Carvilius Maximus
292	Q. Fabius Maximus Gurges	D. Junius Brutus Scaeva
291	L. Postumius Megellus III	C. Junius Bubulcus Brutus
290	P. Cornelius Rufinus	M'. Curius Dentatus
289	M. Valerius Maximus Corvinus II	Q. Caedicius Noctua
288	Q. Marcius Tremulus II	P. Cornelius Arvina II
287	M. Claudius Marcellus	C. Nautius Rutilus
286	M. Valerius Maximus (Potitus? Corvinus III?)	C. Aelius Paetus
285	C. Claudius Canina	M. Aemilius Lepidus
284	C. Servilius Tucca	L. Caecilius Metellus Denter
283	P. Cornelius Dolabella	Cn. Domitius Calvinus Maximus
282	C. Fabricius Luscinus	Q. Aemilius Papus
281	L. Aemilius Barbula	Q. Marcius Philippus
280	P. Valerius Laevinus	Ti. Coruncanius
279	P. Sulpicius Saverrio	P. Decius Mus
278	C. Fabricius Luscinus II	Q. Aemilius Papus II
277	P. Cornelius Rufinus II	C. Junius Bubulcus Brutus II
276	Q. Fabius Maximus Gurges II	C. Genucius Clepsina
275	M'. Curius Dentatus II	L. Cornelius Lentulus Caudinus
274	M'. Curius Dentatus III	Ser. Cornelius Merenda
273	C. Fabius Licinus	C. Claudius Canina II
272	L. Papirius Cursor II	Sp. Carvilius Maximus II
271	C. Quinctius Claudus	L. Genucius Clepsina
270	C. Genucius Clepsina II	Cn. Cornelius Blasio
269	Q. Ogulnius Gallus	C. Fabius Pictor
268	P. Sempronius Sophus	Ap. Claudius Russus
267	M. Atilius Regulus	L. Julius Libo
266	D. Junius Pera	N. Fabius Pictor
265	Q. Fabius Maximus Gurges	L. Mamilius Vitulus
264	Ap. Claudius Caudex	M. Fulvius Flaccus
263	M'. Valerius Maximus Mesalla	M'. Otacilius Crassus
262	L. Postumius Megellus	Q. Mamilius Vitulus
261	L. Valerius Flaccus	T. Otacilius Crassus
260	Cn. Cornelius Scipio Asina	C. Duilius
259	L. Cornelius Scipio	C. Aquillius Florus
258	A. Atilius Caiatinus	C. Sulpicius Paterculus
257	C. Atilius Regulus	Cn. Cornelius Blasio II
256	L. Manlius Vulso Longus	Q. Caedicius
suff.		M. Atilius Regulus II
255	Ser. Fulvius Paetinus Nobilior	M. Aemilius Paullus
254	Cn. Cornelius Scipio Asina II	A. Atilius Caiatinus II
253	Cn. Servilius Caepio	C. Sempronius Blaesus
252	C. Aurelius Cotta	P. Servilius Geminus
251	L. Caecilius Metellus	C. Furius Pacilus
250	C. Atilius Regulus II	L. Manlius Vulso Longus II
249	P. Claudius Pulcher	L. Junius Pullus
248	C. Aurelius Cotta II	P. Servilius Geminus II
247	L. Caecilius Metellus II	N. Fabius Buteo
246	M'. Otacilius Crassus II	M. Fabius Licinus
245	M. Fabius Buteo	C. Atilius Bulbus
244	A. Manlius Torquatus Atticus	C. Sempronius Blaesus II
243	C. Fundanius Fundulus	C. Sulpicius Galus
242	C. Lutatius Catulus	A. Postumius Albinus
241	A. Manlius Torquatus Atticus II	Q. Lutatius Cerco
240	C. Claudius Centho	M. Sempronius Tuditanus
239	C. Mamilius Turrinus	Q. Valerius Falto
238	Ti. Sempronius Gracchus	P. Valerius Falto
237	L. Cornelius Lentulus Caudinus	Q. Fulvius Flaccus
236	P. Cornelius Lentulus Caudinus	C. Licinius Varus
235	T. Manlius Torquatus	C. Atilius Bulbus II
234	L. Postumius Albinus	Sp. Carvilius Maximus Ruga
233	Q. Fabius Maximus Verrucosus	M'. Pomponius Matho
232	M. Aemilius Lepidus	M. Publicius Malleolus
231	M. Pomponius Matho	C. Papirius Maso
230	M. Aemilius Barbula	M. Junius Pera
229	L. Postumius Albinus II	Cn. Fulvius Centumalus
228	Sp. Carvilius Maximus Ruga II	Q. Fabius Maximus Verrucosus II
227	P. Valerius Flaccus	M. Atilius Regulus
226	M. Valerius Messalla	L. Apustius Fullo
225	L. Aemilius Papus	C. Atilius Regulus
224	T. Manlius Torquatus II	Q. Fulvius Flaccus II
223	C. Flaminius	P. Furius Philus
222	M. Claudius Marcellus	Cn. Cornelius Scipio Calvus
221	P. Cornelius Scipio Asina	M. Minucius Rufus
220	M. Valerius Laevinus (invalidated)	Q. Mucius Scaevola (invalidated)
220	C. Lutatius Catulus	L. Veturius Philo
219	L. Aemilius Paullus	M. Livius Salinator
218	P. Cornelius Scipio	Ti. Sempronius Longus
217	Cn. Servilius Geminus	C. Flaminius II
suff.		M. Atilius Regulus II
216	C. Terentius Varro	L. Aemilius Paullus II
215	L. Postumius Albinus III (killed before taking office)	Ti. Sempronius Gracchus
suff.	M. Claudius Marcellus II (invalidated)	
suff.	Q. Fabius Maximus Verrucosus III	
214	Q. Fabius Maximus Verrucosus IV	M. Claudius Marcellus III
213	Q. Fabius Maximus	Ti. Sempronius Gracchus II
212	Q. Fulvius Flaccus III	Ap. Claudius Pulcher
211	Cn. Fulvius Centumalus Maximus	P. Sulpicius Galba Maximus
210	M. Claudius Marcellus IV	M. Valerius Laevinus II
209	Q. Fabius Maximus Verrucosus V	Q. Fulvius Flaccus IV
208	M. Claudius Marcellus V	T. Quinctius Crispinus
207	C. Claudius Nero	M. Livius Salinator II
206	L. Veturius Philo	Q. Caecilius Metellus
205	P. Cornelius Scipio (Africanus)	P. Licinius Crassus Dives
204	M. Cornelius Cethegus	P. Sempronius Tuditanus
203	Cn. Servilius Caepio	C. Servilius Geminus
202	M. Servilius Pulex Geminus	Ti. Claudius Nero
201	Cn. Cornelius Lentulus	P. Aelius Paetus

== Second century BC (200–101) ==
Year		
200	P. Sulpicius Galba Maximus II	C. Aurelius Cotta
199	L. Cornelius Lentulus	P. Villius Tappulus
198	T. Quinctius Flamininus	Sex. Aelius Paetus Catus
197	C. Cornelius Cethegus	Q. Minucius Rufus
196	L. Furius Purpureo	M. Claudius Marcellus
195	L. Valerius Flaccus	M. Porcius Cato
194	P. Cornelius Scipio Africanus II	Ti. Sempronius Longus
193	L. Cornelius Merula	Q. Minucius Thermus
192	L. Quinctius Flamininus	Cn. Domitius Ahenobarbus
191	P. Cornelius Scipio Nasica	M'. Acilius Glabrio
190	L. Cornelius Scipio Asiaticus	C. Laelius
189	M. Fulvius Nobilior	Cn. Manlius Vulso
188	M. Valerius Messalla	C. Livius Salinator
187	M. Aemilius Lepidus	C. Flaminius
186	Sp. Postumius Albinus	Q. Marcius Philippus
185	Ap. Claudius Pulcher	M. Sempronius Tuditanus
184	P. Claudius Pulcher	L. Porcius Licinus
183	M. Claudius Marcellus	Q. Fabius Labeo
182	Cn. Baebius Tamphilus	L. Aemilius Paullus (Macedonicus)
181	P. Cornelius Cethegus	M. Baebius Tamphilus
180	A. Postumius Albinus Luscus	C. Calpurnius Piso
suff.		Q. Fulvius Flaccus
179	Q. Fulvius Flaccus	L. Manlius Acidinus Fulvianus
178	M. Junius Brutus	A. Manlius Vulso
177	C. Claudius Pulcher	Ti. Sempronius Gracchus
176	Cn. Cornelius Scipio Hispallus	Q. Petillius Spurinus
suff.	C. Valerius Laevinus	
175	P. Mucius Scaevola	M. Aemilius Lepidus II
174	Sp. Postumius Albinus Paullulus	Q. Mucius Scaevola
173	L. Postumius Albinus	M. Popillius Laenas
172	C. Popillius Laenas	P. Aelius Ligus
171	P. Licinius Crassus	C. Cassius Longinus
170	A. Hostilius Mancinus	A. Atilius Serranus
169	Q. Marcius Philippus II	Cn. Servilius Caepio
168	L. Aemilius Paullus Macedonicus II	C. Licinius Crassus
167	Q. Aelius Paetus	M. Junius Pennus
166	M. Claudius Marcellus	C. Sulpicius Galus
165	T. Manlius Torquatus	Cn. Octavius
164	A. Manlius Torquatus	Q. Cassius Longinus
163	Ti. Sempronius Gracchus II	M'. Juventius Thalna
162	P. Cornelius Scipio Nasica Corculum	C. Marcius Figulus
suff.	P. Cornelius Lentulus	Cn. Domitius Ahenobarbus
161	M. Valerius Messalla	C. Fannius Strabo
160	L. Anicius Gallus	M. Cornelius Cethegus
159	Cn. Cornelius Dolabella	M. Fulvius Nobilior
158	M. Aemilius Lepidus	C. Popillius Laenas II
157	Sex. Julius Caesar	L. Aurelius Orestes
156	L. Cornelius Lentulus Lupus	C. Marcius Figulus II
155	P. Cornelius Scipio Nasica Corculum II	M. Claudius Marcellus II
154	Q. Opimius	L. Postumius Albinus
suff.		M'. Acilius Glabrio
153	Q. Fulvius Nobilior	T. Annius Luscus
152	M. Claudius Marcellus III	L. Valerius Flaccus
151	L. Licinius Lucullus	A. Postumius Albinus
150	T. Quinctius Flamininus	M'. Acilius Balbus
149	L. Marcius Censorinus	M'. Manilius
148	Sp. Postumius Albinus Magnus	L. Calpurnius Piso Caesoninus
147	P. Cornelius Scipio Aemilianus	C. Livius Drusus
146	Cn. Cornelius Lentulus	L. Mummius Achaicus
145	Q. Fabius Maximus Aemilianus	L. Hostilius Mancinus
144	Ser. Sulpicius Galba	L. Aurelius Cotta
143	Ap. Claudius Pulcher	Q. Caecilius Metellus Macedonicus
142	L. Caecilius Metellus Calvus	Q. Fabius Maximus Servilianus
141	Cn. Servilius Caepio	Q. Pompeius
140	C. Laelius Sapiens	Q. Servilius Caepio
139	Cn. Calpurnius Piso	M. Popillius Laenas
138	P. Cornelius Scipio Nasica Serapio	D. Junius Brutus (Callaicus)
137	M. Aemilius Lepidus Porcina	C. Hostilius Mancinus
136	L. Furius Philus	Sex. Atilius Serranus
135	Ser. Fulvius Flaccus	Q. Calpurnius Piso
134	P. Cornelius Scipio Africanus Aemilianus II	C. Fulvius Flaccus
133	P. Mucius Scaevola	L. Calpurnius Piso Frugi
132	P. Popillius Laenas	P. Rupilius
131	P. Licinius Crassus Dives Mucianus	L. Valerius Flaccus
130	L. Cornelius Lentulus	M. Perperna
suff.	Ap. Claudius Pulcher	
129	C. Sempronius Tuditanus	M'. Aquillius
128	Cn. Octavius	T. Annius Rufus
127	L. Cassius Longinus Ravilla	L. Cornelius Cinna
126	M. Aemilius Lepidus	L. Aurelius Orestes
125	M. Plautius Hypsaeus	M. Fulvius Flaccus
124	C. Cassius Longinus	C. Sextius Calvinus
123	Q. Caecilius Metellus (Balearicus)	T. Quinctius Flamininus
122	Cn. Domitius Ahenobarbus	C. Fannius
121	L. Opimius	Q. Fabius Maximus (Allobrogicus)
120	P. Manilius	C. Papirius Carbo
119	L. Caecilius Metellus (Delmaticus)	L. Aurelius Cotta
118	M. Porcius Cato	Q. Marcius Rex
117	L. Caecilius Metellus Diadematus	Q. Mucius Scaevola (Augur)
116	C. Licinius Geta	Q. Fabius Maximus Eburnus
115	M. Aemilius Scaurus	M. Caecilius Metellus
114	M'. Acilius Balbus	C. Porcius Cato
113	C. Caecilius Metellus Caprarius	Cn. Papirius Carbo
112	M. Livius Drusus	L. Calpurnius Piso Caesoninus
111	P. Cornelius Scipio Nasica	L. Calpurnius Bestia
110	M. Minucius Rufus	Sp. Postumius Albinus
109	Q. Caecilius Metellus (Numidicus)	M. Junius Silanus
108	Ser. Sulpicius Galba	Hortensius (invalidated)
suff.		M. Aurelius Scaurus
107	C. Marius I	L. Cassius Longinus
106	Q. Servilius Caepio	C. Atilius Serranus
105	P. Rutilius Rufus	Cn. Mallius Maximus
104	C. Marius II	C. Flavius Fimbria
103	C. Marius III	L. Aurelius Orestes
102	C. Marius IV	Q. Lutatius Catulus
101	C. Marius V	M'. Aquillius

== First century BC (100–1) ==
Year		
100	C. Marius VI	L. Valerius Flaccus
99	M. Antonius	A. Postumius Albinus
98	Q. Caecilius Metellus Nepos	T. Didius
97	Cn. Cornelius Lentulus	P. Licinius Crassus
96	Cn. Domitius Ahenobarbus	C. Cassius Longinus
95	L. Licinius Crassus	Q. Mucius Scaevola (Pontifex)
94	C. Coelius Caldus	L. Domitius Ahenobarbus
93	C. Valerius Flaccus	M. Herennius
92	C. Claudius Pulcher	M. Perperna
91	L. Marcius Philippus	Sex. Julius Caesar
90	L. Julius Caesar	P. Rutilius Lupus
89	Cn. Pompeius Strabo	L. Porcius Cato
88	L. Cornelius Sulla	Q. Pompeius Rufus
87	Cn. Octavius	L. Cornelius Cinna
suff.		L. Cornelius Merula
86	L. Cornelius Cinna II	C. Marius VII
suff.		L. Valerius Flaccus
85	L. Cornelius Cinna III	Cn. Papirius Carbo
84	Cn. Papirius Carbo II	L. Cornelius Cinna IV
83	L. Cornelius Scipio Asiagenes (Asiaticus)	C. Norbanus
82	C. Marius	Cn. Papirius Carbo III
81	M. Tullius Decula	Cn. Cornelius Dolabella
80	L. Cornelius Sulla Felix II	Q. Caecilius Metellus Pius
79	P. Servilius Vatia (Isauricus)	Ap. Claudius Pulcher
78	M. Aemilius Lepidus	Q. Lutatius Catulus
77	D. Junius Brutus	Mam. Aemilius Lepidus Livianus
76	Cn. Octavius	C. Scribonius Curio
75	L. Octavius	C. Aurelius Cotta
74	L. Licinius Lucullus	M. Aurelius Cotta
73	M. Terentius Varro Lucullus	C. Cassius Longinus
72	L. Gellius	Cn. Cornelius Lentulus Clodianus
71	P. Cornelius Lentulus Sura	Cn. Aufidius Orestes
70	Cn. Pompeius Magnus	M. Licinius Crassus
69	Q. Hortensius Hortalus	Q. Caecilius Metellus (Creticus)
68	L. Caecilius Metellus	Q. Marcius Rex
suff.	(Servilius) Vatia (died before taking office)	
67	C. Calpurnius Piso	M'. Acilius Glabrio
66	M'. Aemilius Lepidus	L. Volcacius Tullus
65	P. Cornelius Sulla (invalidated)	P. Autronius Paetus (invalidated)
suff.	L. Aurelius Cotta	L. Manlius Torquatus
64	L. Julius Caesar	(?) Minucius Thermus
		C. Marcius Figulus
63	M. Tullius Cicero	C. Antonius Hybrida
62	D. Junius Silanus	L. Licinius Murena
61	M. Pupius Piso Frugi Calpurnianus	M. Valerius Messalla Niger
60	L. Afranius	Q. Caecilius Metellus Celer
59	C. Julius Caesar	M. Calpurnius Bibulus
58	L. Calpurnius Piso Caesoninus	A. Gabinius
57	P. Cornelius Lentulus Spinther	Q. Caecilius Metellus Nepos
56	Cn. Cornelius Lentulus Marcellinus	L. Marcius Philippus
55	Cn. Pompeius Magnus II	M. Licinius Crassus II
54	L. Domitius Ahenobarbus	Ap. Claudius Pulcher
53	Cn. Domitius Calvinus	M. Valerius Messalla Rufus
52	Cn. Pompeius Magnus III	Q. Caecilius Metellus Pius Scipio (from 1 September)
51	Ser. Sulpicius Rufus	M. Claudius Marcellus
50	L. Aemilius Paullus	C. Claudius Marcellus
49	C. Claudius Marcellus	L. Cornelius Lentulus Crus
48	C. Julius Caesar II	P. Servilius Isauricus
47	Q. Fufius Calenus	P. Vatinius
46	C. Julius Caesar III	M. Aemilius Lepidus
45	C. Julius Caesar IV	sine collega
suff.	Q. Fabius Maximus (from 1 October)	C. Trebonius (from 1 October)
suff.	C. Caninius Rebilus (31 December)	
44	C. Julius Caesar V	M. Antonius
suff.	P. Cornelius Dolabella (after 15 March)	
43	C. Vibius Pansa Caetronianus (until 21 April)	A. Hirtius (until 21 April)
suff.	C. Julius Caesar (Octavianus) (from 19 August)	Q. Pedius (from 19 August)
suff.	C. Carrinas (from 27 November)	P. Ventidius (from 27 November)
42	M. Aemilius Lepidus II	L. Munatius Plancus
41	L. Antonius Pietas	P. Servilius Isauricus II
40	Cn. Domitius Calvinus II	C. Asinius Pollio
suff.	L. Cornelius Balbus	P. Canidius Crassus
39	L. Marcius Censorinus	C. Calvisius Sabinus
suff.	C. Cocceius Balbus (after 2 October)	P. Alfenus Varus (after 2 October)
38	Ap. Claudius Pulcher	C. Norbanus Flaccus
suff.	L. Cornelius Lentulus (from 1 July)	L. Marcius Philippus (from 1 September)
37	M. (Vipsanius) Agrippa	L. Caninius Gallus
suff.		T. Statilius Taurus
36	L. Gellius Poplicola	M. Cocceius Nerva
suff.	L. Nonius Asprenas (from 1 September)	Q. Marcius Rufus (from 1 July)
35	L. Cornificius	Sex. Pompeius
suff.	P. Cornelius Dolabella (from 1 September)	T. Peducaeus (from 1 July)
34	M. Antonius II (1 January only)	L. Scribonius Libo
suff.	L. Sempronius Atratinus	
suff.	Paullus Aemilius Lepidus (from 1 July)	C. Memmius (from 1 July)
suff.		M. Herennius Picens (from September or November)
33	Imp. Caesar (Octavianus) II (1 January only)	L. Volcacius Tullus
suff.	L. Autronius Paetus	
suff.	L. Flavius (1 May–before October)	C. Fonteius Capito (1 May–before October)
suff.	M. Acilius Glabrio (1 July–before October)	
suff.	L. Vinicius (from 1 September)	
suff.	Q. Laronius (from 1 October)	
32	Cn. Domitius Ahenobarbus	C. Sosius
suff.	L. Cornelius (Balbus? Cinna?)	M. Valerius Messalla
31	M. Antonius III (in the east)	Imp. Caesar III
suff.	M. Valerius Messalla Corvinus (from 1 January)	
suff.	M. Titius (from 1 May)	
suff.	Cn. Pompeius (from 1 October)	
30	Imp. Caesar IV	M. Licinius Crassus
suff.		C. Antistius Vetus (from 1 July)
suff.		M. Tullius Cicero (from 1 September)
suff.		L. Saenius
29	Imp. Caesar V	Sex. Appuleius
suff.		Potitus Valerius Messalla
28	Imp. Caesar VI	M. Agrippa II
27	Imp. Caesar Augustus VII	M. Agrippa III
26	Imp. Caesar Augustus VIII	T. Statilius Taurus II
25	Imp. Caesar Augustus IX	M. Junius Silanus
24	Imp. Caesar Augustus X	C. Norbanus Flaccus
23	Imp. Caesar Augustus XI	A. Terentius Varro Murena (abdicated)
suff.	L. Sestius Albanianus Quirinalis (from 1 July)	Cn. Calpurnius Piso
22	M. Claudius Marcellus Aeserninus	L. Arruntius
21	M. Lollius	Q. Aemilius Lepidus
20	M. Appuleius	P. Silius Nerva
19	C. Sentius Saturninus	Q. Lucretius Vespillo (after 1 August)
suff.	M. Vinicius (after 1 August)	
18	P. Cornelius Lentulus Marcellinus	Cn. Cornelius Lentulus
17	C. Furnius	C. Junius Silanus
16	L. Domitius Ahenobarbus	P. Cornelius Scipio
suff.		L. Tarius Rufus
15	M. Livius Drusus Libo	L. Calpurnius Piso
14	M. Licinius Crassus Frugi	Cn. Cornelius Lentulus (Augur)
13	Ti. Claudius Nero	P. Quinctilius Varus
12	M. Valerius Messalla Appianus	P. Sulpicius Quirinius
suff.	C. Valgius Rufus (by 6 March)	
suff.	C. Caninius Rebilus (after 29 August)	L. Volusius Saturninus (after 29 August)
11	Q. Aelius Tubero	Paullus Fabius Maximus
10	Africanus Fabius Maximus	Iullus Antonius
9	Nero Claudius Drusus	T. Quinctius Crispinus Sulpicianus
8	C. Marcius Censorinus	C. Asinius Gallus
7	Ti. Claudius Nero II	Cn. Calpurnius Piso
6	D. Laelius Balbus	C. Antistius Vetus
5	Imp. Caesar Augustus XII	L. Cornelius Sulla
suff.	Q. Haterius (after 11 April)	L. Vinicius (after 11 April)
suff.		C. Sulpicius Galba (by 13 August)
4	C. Calvisius Sabinus	L. Passienus Rufus
suff.	C. Caelius	Galus Sulpicius (after 1 July)
3	L. Cornelius Lentulus	M. Valerius Messalla Messallinus
2	Imp. Caesar Augustus XIII	M. Plautius Silvanus
suff.	C. Fufius Geminus (by 18 September)	L. Caninius Gallus (by 1 August)
suff.	Q. Fabricius (by 1 December)	
1	Cossus Cornelius Lentulus (Gaetulicus)	L. Calpurnius Piso (Augur)
suff.	A. Plautius	A. Caecina Severus

== First century (1–100) ==
Year		
1	C. Caesar	L. Aemilius Paullus
Jul.		M. Herennius Picens
2	P. Vinicius	P. Alfenus Varus
Jul.	P. Cornelius Lentulus Scipio	T. Quinctius Crispinus Valerianus
3	L. Aelius Lamia	M. Servilius
Jul.	P. Silius	L. Volusius Saturninus
4	Sex. Aelius Catus	C. Sentius Saturninus
Jul.	Cn. Sentius Saturninus	C. Clodius Licinus
5	L. Valerius Messalla Volesus	Cn. Cornelius Cinna Magnus
Jul.	C. Vibius Postumus	C. Ateius Capito
6	M. Aemilius Lepidus	L. Arruntius
Jul.		L. Nonius Asprenas
7	Q. Caecilius Metellus Creticus Silanus	A. Licinius Nerva Silianus
Jul.		Lucilius Longus
8	M. Furius Camillus	Sex. Nonius Quinctilianus
Jul.	L. Apronius	A. Vibius Habitus
9	C. Poppaeus Sabinus	Q. Sulpicius Camerinus
Jul.	M. Papius Mutilus	Q. Poppaeus Secundus
10	P. Cornelius Dolabella	C. Junius Silanus
Jul.	Ser. Cornelius Lentulus Maluginensis	Q. Junius Blaesus
11	M'. Aemilius Lepidus	T. Statilius Taurus
Jul.	L. Cassius Longinus	
12	Germanicus Julius Caesar	C. Fonteius Capito
Jul.		C. Visellius Varro
13	C. Silius	L. Munatius Plancus
suff.	C. Caecina Largus	
14	Sex. Pompeius	Sex. Appuleius
15	Drusus Julius Caesar	C. Norbanus Flaccus
Jul.		M. Junius Silanus
16	Sisenna Statilius Taurus	L. Scribonius Libo
Jul.	C. Vibius Rufus	C. Pomponius Graecinus
17	L. Pomponius Flaccus	C. Caelius Rufus
suff.	C. Vibius Marsus	L. Voluseius Proculus
18	Ti. Caesar Augustus III (January)	Germanicus Julius Caesar II (January–April)
suff.	L. Seius Tubero (February–July)	M. Livineius Regulus (May–July)
suff.	C. Rubellius Blandus (August–December)	M. Vipstanus Gallus
19	M. Junius Silanus Torquatus	L. Norbanus Balbus
Jul.		P. Petronius
20	M. Valerius Messalla Barbatus	M. Aurelius Cotta Maximus Messalinus
21	Ti. Caesar Augustus IV	Drusus Julius Caesar II
suff.	Mam. Aemilius Scaurus	Cn. Tremellius
22	D. Haterius Agrippa	C. Sulpicius Galba
23	C. Asinius Pollio	C. Antistius Vetus
suff.		C. Stertinius Maximus
24	Ser. Cornelius Cethegus	L. Visellius Varro
Jul.	C. Calpurnius Aviola	P. Cornelius Lentulus Scipio
25	Cossus Cornelius Lentulus	M. Asinius Agrippa
Sep.	C. Petronius	
26	Cn. Cornelius Lentulus Gaetulicus	C. Calvisius Sabinus
suff.	Q. Junius Blaesus	L. Antistius Vetus
27	L. Calpurnius Piso	M. Licinius Crassus Frugi
suff.	P. Cornelius Lentulus	C. Sallustius Passienus Crispus
28	Ap. Junius Silanus	P. Silius Nerva
suff.	L. Junius Silanus	C. Vellaeus Tutor
29	C. Fufius Geminus	L. Rubellius Geminus
Jul.	A. Plautius	L. Nonius Asprenas
30	L. Cassius Longinus	M. Vinicius
Jul.	L. Naevius Surdinus	C. Cassius Longinus
31	Ti. Caesar Augustus V	L. Aelius Sejanus
9 May	Faustus Cornelius Sulla	Sex. Tedius Valerius Catullus
Jul.		L. Fulcinius Trio
Oct.	P. Memmius Regulus	
32	Cn. Domitius Ahenobarbus	L. Arruntius Camillus Scribonianus
Jul.		A. Vitellius
33	L. Livius Ocella Sulpicius Galba	L. Cornelius Sulla Felix
Jul.	L. Salvius Otho	C. Octavius Laenas
34	Paullus Fabius Persicus	L. Vitellius
Jul.	Q. Marcius Barea Soranus	T. Rustius Nummius Gallus
35	C. Cestius Gallus	M. Servilius Nonianus
Jul.	D. Valerius Asiaticus	A. Gabinius Secundus
36	Sex. Papinius Allenius	Q. Plautius
Jul.	C. Vettius Rufus	M. Porcius Cato
37	Cn. Acerronius Proculus	C. Petronius Pontius Nigrinus
1 Jul.	C. Caesar Augustus Germanicus	Ti. Claudius Nero Germanicus
1 Sep.	A. Caecina Paetus	C. Caninius Rebilus
38	M. Aquila Julianus	P. Nonius Asprenas Calpurnius Serranus
1 Jul.	Ser. Asinius Celer	Sex. Nonius Quinctilianus
39	C. Caesar Augustus Germanicus II	L. Apronius Caesianus
Feb.	Q. Sanquinius Maximus	
1 Jul.	Cn. Domitius Corbulo	unidentified
suff.	Cn. Domitius Afer	A. Didius Gallus (2 September–December)
40	C. Caesar Augustus Germanicus III	without colleague
id. Jan.	C. Laecanius Bassus	Q. Terentius Culleo
41	C. Caesar Augustus Germanicus IV (January)	Cn. Sentius Saturninus (January–June)
suff.	Q. Pomponius Secundus (February–June)	
1 Jul.	unidentified	unidentified
suff.	Q. Futius Lusius Saturninus (September–October)	M. Seius Varanus
suff.	Q. Ostorius Scapula (November–December)	P. Suillius Rufus
42	Ti. Claudius Caesar Augustus Germanicus II	C. Caecina Largus
Mar.	C. Cestius Gallus	C. Caecina Largus
Sep.?	Cornelius Lupus	C. Caecina Largus
43	Ti. Claudius Caesar Augustus Germanicus III	L. Vitellius II
Mar.	Sex. Palpellius Hister	L. Pedanius Secundus
Aug.?	A. Gabinius Secundus	unidentified
Oct.	Q. Curtius Rufus	Sp. Oppius
44	C. Sallustius Passienus Crispus II	T. Statilius Taurus
suff.	P. Calvisius Sabinus Pomponius Secundus	
suff.	(?) T. Axius	(?) T. Mussidius Pollianus
45	M. Vinicius II	T. Statilius Taurus Corvinus
1 Mar.	Ti. Plautius Silvanus Aelianus	T. Statilius Taurus Corvinus
Jul.?	M. Pompeius Silvanus Staberius Flavianus	A. Antonius Rufus
Dec.?	(?) P. Fabius Firmanus	(?) L. Tampius Flavianus
46	D. Valerius Asiaticus II (January–February)	M. Junius Silanus (January–December)
suff.	Camerinus Antistius Vetus (early March)	
suff.	Q. Sulpicius Camerinus (early March–June)	
suff.	D. Laelius Balbus (July–August)	
suff.	C. Terentius Tullius Geminus (September–December)	
47	Ti. Claudius Caesar Augustus Germanicus IV	L. Vitellius III
1 Mar.	C. Calpetanus Rantius Sedatus	M. Hordeonius Flaccus
1 Jul.	Cn. Hosidius Geta	T. Flavius Sabinus
1 Sep.	Cn. Hosidius Geta	L. Vagellius
1 Nov.	Cn. Hosidius Geta	C. Volasenna Severus
48	A. Vitellius	L. Vipstanus Poplicola
1 Jul.	L. Vitellius	Messalla Vipstanus Gallus
49	Q. Veranius	C. Pompeius Longinus Gallus
suff.	L. Mammius Pollio	Q. Allius Maximus
50	C. Antistius Vetus II	M. Suillius Nerullinus
suff.	Q. Futius	P. Calvisius
51	Ti. Claudius Caesar Augustus Germanicus V	Ser. Cornelius Scipio Salvidienus Orfitus
Sep.?	Ti. Claudius Caesar Augustus Germanicus V	L. Calventius Vetus Carminius
Nov.	Ti. Claudius Caesar Augustus Germanicus V	T. Flavius Vespasianus
52	Faustus Cornelius Sulla Felix	L. Salvius Otho Titianus
Jul.	Faustus Cornelius Sulla Felix	Q. Marcius Barea Soranus
Nov.?	Faustus Cornelius Sulla Felix	L. Salvidienus Rufus Salvianus
53	D. Junius Silanus Torquatus	Q. Haterius Antoninus
suff.	Q. Caecina Primus	P. Trebonius
suff.	P. Calvisius Ruso	P. Trebonius
54	M'. Acilius Aviola	M. Asinius Marcellus
Jul.?	M. Junius Silanus	A. Pompeius Paulinus
Sep.?	M. Junius Silanus	Vellaeus Tutor
55	Nero Claudius Caesar Augustus Germanicus	L. Antistius Vetus
1 Mar.	N. Cestius	
1 May	P. Cornelius Dolabella	L. Annaeus Seneca
1 Jul.	M. Trebellius Maximus	
1 Sep.	T. (or P.?) Palfurius	
1 Nov.	Cn. Cornelius Lentulus Gaetulicus	T. Curtilius Mancia
56	Q. Volusius Saturninus	P. Cornelius Scipio
1 Jul.	L. Junius Gallio Annaeanus	T. Cutius Ciltus
1 Sep.	P. Sulpicius Scribonius Rufus	P. Sulpicius Scribonius Proculus
1 Nov.	L. Duvius Avitus	P. Clodius Thrasea Paetus
57	Nero Claudius Caesar Augustus Germanicus II	L. Calpurnius Piso
1 Jul.		L. Caesius Martialis
58	Nero Claudius Caesar Augustus Germanicus III	M. Valerius Messalla Corvinus
1 May	C. Fonteius Agrippa	
1 Jul.	A. Paconius Sabinus	A. Petronius Lurco
59	C. Vipstanus Apronianus	C. Fonteius Capito
1 Jul.	T. Sextius Africanus	M. Ostorius Scapula
60	Nero Claudius Caesar Augustus Germanicus IV	Cossus Cornelius Lentulus
1 Jul.	C. Velleius Paterculus	M. Manilius Vopiscus
61	P. Petronius Turpilianus	L. Junius Caesennius Paetus
1 Jul.	Cn. Pedanius Fuscus Salinator	L. Velleius Paterculus
62	P. Marius	Lucius Afinius Gallus
Jul.?	Q. Manlius Tarquitius Saturninus	P. Petronius Niger
Sep.?	T. Clodius Eprius Marcellus	C. Junius Marullus
63	C. Memmius Regulus	L. Verginius Rufus
suff.	unidentified	unidentified
64	C. Laecanius Bassus	M. Licinius Crassus Frugi
suff.	unidentified	unidentified
65	A. Licinius Nerva Silianus	M. Julius Vestinus Atticus (killed)
suff.		P. Pasidienus Firmus (attested 17 Jun.)
suff.	C. Pomponius Pius (attested 13 Aug.)	C. Anicius Cerialis (attested 13 Aug.)
66	C. Luccius Telesinus	C. Suetonius Paullinus
Jul.	M. Annius Afrinus	C. Paccius Africanus
Sep.	M. Arruntius Aquila	M. Vettius Bolanus
67	L. Julius Rufus	Fonteius Capito
suff.		L. Aurelius Priscus
Jul.	Ap. Annius Gallus	L. Verulanus Severus
68	Ti. Catius Asconius Silius Italicus	P. Galerius Trachalus
suff.	Imp. Nero Claudius Caesar Augustus Germanicus V (April–June)	C. Luccius Telesinus II (from May?)
suff.	C. Bellicius Natalis	P. Cornelius Scipio Asiaticus
69	Ser. Galba Caesar Augustus (Note: Sometimes "Imp. Ser. Galba" or "Ser. Galba Imp.") II (until 15 Jan.)	T. Vinius (Rufinus?) (until 15 Jan.)
suff.	M. Otho Caesar Augustus (Note: Sometimes "Imp. Otho" or "Imp. M. Otho".) (15 January–28 February)	L. Salvius Otho Titianus II
suff.	L. Verginius Rufus II (March)	L. Pompeius Vopiscus
suff.	Cn. Arulenus Caelius Sabinus (April–June)	T. Flavius Sabinus
suff.	Cn. Arrius Antoninus (July–August)	A. Marius Celsus
suff.	Fabius Valens (September–October)	A. Caecina Alienus (September–30 October)
suff.		Rosius Regulus (31 October)
suff.	Cn. Caecilius Simplex (November−December)	C. Quinctius Atticus
70	Imp. Caesar Vespasianus Augustus II	T. Caesar Vespasianus
suff.	C. Licinius Mucianus II (Apr.?)	unidentified
suff.	M. Ulpius Traianus (May?)	unidentified
suff.	(…)ne(…)	unidentified
Nov.?	L. Annius Bassus	C. Laecanius Bassus Caecina Paetus
71	Imp. Caesar Vespasianus Augustus III	M. Cocceius Nerva
Apr.?	Caesar Domitianus	Cn. Pedius Cascus
May?	Caesar Domitianus	C. Calpetanus Rantius Quirinalis Valerius Festus
Jul.?	L. Flavius Fimbria	C. Atilius Barbarus
1 Nov.	Cn. Pompeius Collega	Q. Julius Cordus
72	Imp. Caesar Vespasianus Augustus IV	T. Caesar Vespasianus II
suff.	C. Licinius Mucianus III (attested 29 May)	T. Flavius Sabinus II (attested 29 May)
suff.	Q. Julius Cordinus C. Rutilius Gallicus	unidentified
suff.	Sex. Marcius Priscus (attested 30 Dec.)	Cn. Pinarius Aemilius Cicatricula (attested 30 Dec.)
73	Caesar Domitianus II	L. Valerius Catullus Messallinus
1 May	M. Arrecinus Clemens	(…)m(…)
suff.	unidentified	unidentified
74	Imp. Caesar Vespasianus Augustus V	T. Caesar Vespasianus III
id. Jan.	Ti. Plautius Silvanus Aelianus II	T. Caesar Vespasianus III
id. Mar.	L. Junius Q. Vibius Crispus II	T. Caesar Vespasianus III
id. May	Q. Petillius Cerialis Caesius Rufus II	T. Clodius Eprius Marcellus II
1 Jul.	(…)on(…)	unidentified
Sep.?	C. Pomponius	L. Manlius Patruinus
75	Imp. Caesar Vespasianus Augustus VI	T. Caesar Vespasianus IV
suff.	Caesar Domitianus III (attested 12 Mar. / 28 Apr.)	L. Pasidienus Firmus (attested 12 Mar. / 28 Apr.)
76	Imp. Caesar Vespasianus Augustus VII	T. Caesar Vespasianus V
suff.	Caesar Domitianus IV	unidentified
suff.	(?) L. Tampius Flavianus II	(?) M. Pompeius Silvanus Staberius Flavianus II
suff.	Galeo Tettienus Petronianus (attested 2 Dec.)	M. Fulvius Gillo (attested 2 Dec.)
77	Imp. Caesar Vespasianus Augustus VIII	T. Caesar Vespasianus VI
suff.	Caesar Domitianus V	unidentified
Sep.?	(?) L. Pompeius Vopiscus C. Arruntius Catellius Celer	(?) M. Arruntius Aquila
Nov.?	Cn. Julius Agricola	unidentified
78	D. Junius Novius Priscus	L. Ceionius Commodus
May.?	(Q. Articuleius?) Paetus	Sex. Vitulasius Nepos
Sep.?	Q. Corellius Rufus	L. Funisulanus Vettonianus
79	Imp. Caesar Vespasianus Augustus IX	T. Caesar Vespasianus VII
suff.	Caesar Domitianus VI	unidentified
1 Mar.	L. Junius Caesennius Paetus (attested until 29 May)	P. Calvisius Ruso
suff.	T. Rubrius Aelius Nepos (attested 8 Sep.)	M. Arrius Flaccus
80	Imp. T. Caesar Vespasianus Augustus VIII	Caesar Domitianus VII
id. Jan.	A. Didius Gallus Fabricius Veiento II	L. Aelius Plautius Lamia Aelianus
Mar.?	Q. Aurelius Pactumeius Fronto	L. Aelius Plautius Lamia Aelianus
May?	C. Marius Marcellus Octavius P. Cluvius Rufus	L. Aelius Plautius Lamia Aelianus
1 Jul.	unidentified	Q. Pompeius Trio
Sep.?	L. Acilius Strabo	Sex. Neranius Capito
Nov.?	M. Tittius Frugi	M. Vinicius Julius Rufus
81	L. Flavius Silva Nonius Bassus	M. Asinius Pollio Verrucosus
Mar.?	M. Roscius Coelius	C. Julius Juvenalis
May?	L. Julius Vettius Paullus	T. Junius Montanus
1 Jul.	C. Scoedius Natta Pinarianus	T. Tettienus Serenus
Sep.?	M. Petronius Umbrinus	L. Carminius Lusitanicus
1 Nov.	L. Turpilius Dexter	M. Maecius Rufus
82	Imp. Caesar Domitianus Augustus VIII	T. Flavius Sabinus
Feb.?	(? Servaeus In)noc(ens)	L. Salvius Otho Cocceianus
Mar.?	(…)an(us)	M'. Acilius Aviola
Apr.?	(M. Mettius? Mo)dest(us)	unidentified
May?	unidentified	unidentified
Jul.?	P. Valerius Patruinus	L. Antonius Saturninus
Sep.?	M. Larcius Magnus Pompeius Silo	T. Aurelius Quietus
Nov.?	unidentified	unidentified
83	Imp. Caesar Domitianus Augustus IX	Q. Petillius Rufus II
Feb.?	A. Didius Gallus Fabricius Veiento III	L. Junius Q. Vibius Crispus III
Mar.?	(?) M. Arrecinus Clemens II	(?) L. Baebius Honoratus
May?	L. Tettius Julianus	Terentius Strabo Erucius Homullus
Sep.?	L. Calventius Sex. Carminius Vetus	M. Cornelius Nigrinus Curiatius Maternus
Nov.?	unidentified	unidentified
84	Imp. Caesar Domitianus Augustus X	C. Oppius Sabinus
suff.	(?) C. Fisius Sabinus (attested 24 Apr.)	(?) M. Annius Messalla (attested 24 Apr.)
Jul.?	unidentified	L. Julius Ursus
Sep.?	C. Tullius Capito Pomponianus Plotius Firmus	C. Cornelius Gallicanus
Nov.?	unidentified	(P. Glitius? G)allus
85	Imp. Caesar Domitianus Augustus XI	T. Aurelius Fulvus II
Mar.?	Q. Julius Cordinus C. Rutilius Gallicus II	L. Valerius Catullus Messallinus II
May?	L. Aelius Oculatus	Q. Gavius Atticus
Jul.?	P. Herennius Pollio	M. Annius Herennius Pollio
Sep.?	D. Aburius Bassus	Q. Julius Balbus
Nov.?	C. Salvius Liberalis Nonius Bassus	Cornelius Orestes
86	Imp. Caesar Domitianus Augustus XII	Ser. Cornelius Dolabella Petronianus
id. Jan.	C. Secius Campanus	Ser. Cornelius Dolabella Petronianus
Mar.?	unidentified	Q. Vibius Secundus
1 May	Sex. Octavius Fronto	Ti. Julius Candidus Marius Celsus
1 Sep.	A. Bucius Lappius Maximus	C. Octavius Tidius Tossianus L. Javolenus Priscus
87	Imp. Caesar Domitianus Augustus XIII	L. Volusius Saturninus
id. Jan.	C. Calpurnius Piso Crassus Frugi Licinianus	L. Volusius Saturninus
1 May	C. Bellicus Natalis P. Gavidius Tebanianus	C. Ducenius Proculus
1 Sep.	C. Cilnius Proculus	L. Neratius Priscus
88	Imp. Caesar Domitianus Augustus XIV	L. Minicius Rufus
id. Jan.	D. Plotius Grypus	L. Minicius Rufus
1 May	Q. Ninnius Hasta	(L. Scribonius?) Libo (Rupilius?) Frugi
1 Sep.	M'. Otacilius Catulus	Sex. Julius Sparsus
89	T. Aurelius Fulvus	M. Asinius Atratinus
1 May	P. Sallustius Blaesus	M. Peducaeus Saenianus
1 Sep.	A. Vicirius Proculus	M'. Laberius Maximus
90	Imp. Caesar Domitianus Augustus XV	M. Cocceius Nerva II
id. Jan.	L. Cornelius Pusio Annius Messalla	M. Cocceius Nerva II
1 Mar.	L. Antistius Rusticus	Ser. Julius Servianus
1 May	Q. Accaeus Rufus	C. Caristanius Fronto
1 Jul.	P. Baebius Italicus	C. Aquilius Proculus
1 Sep.	L. Albius Pullaienus Pollio	Cn. Pinarius Aemilius Cicatricula Pompeius Longinus
1 Nov.	M. Tullius Cerialis	Cn. Pompeius Catullinus
91	M'. Acilius Glabrio	M. Ulpius Trajanus
1 May	Cn. Minicius Faustinus	P. Valerius Marinus
1 Sep.	Q. Valerius Vegetus	P. Metilius Sabinus Nepos
92	Imp. Caesar Domitianus Augustus XVI	Q. Volusius Saturninus
id. Jan.	L. Venuleius Montanus Apronianus	Q. Volusius Saturninus
1 May	L. Stertinius Avitus	Ti. Julius Celsus Polemaeanus
1 Sep.	C. Julius Silanus	Q. Junius Arulenus Rusticus
93	Sex. Pompeius Collega	Q. Peducaeus Priscinus
1 May	T. Avidius Quietus	Sex. Lusianus Proculus
1 Sep.	C. Cornelius Rarus Sextius Na(so?)	(? Tuccius Ceria)lis
94	L. Nonius Calpurnius Asprenas Torquatus	T. Sextius Magius Lateranus
1 May	M. Lollius Paullinus D. Valerius Asiaticus Saturninus	C. Antius A. Julius Quadratus
1 Sep.	L. Silius Decianus	T. Pomponius Bassus
95	Imp. Caesar Domitianus Augustus XVII	T. Flavius Clemens
id. Jan.	L. Neratius Marcellus	T. Flavius Clemens
1 May	A. Bucius Lappius Maximus II	P. Ducenius Verus
1 Sep.	Q. Pomponius Rufus	L. Baebius Tullus
96	C. Manlius Valens	C. Antistius Vetus
1 May	Q. Fabius Postuminus	T. Prifernius Paetus
1 Sep.	Ti. Catius Caesius Fronto	M. Calpurnius (…)cus
97	Imp. Nerva Caesar Augustus III	L. Verginius Rufus III
Mar.?	Cn. Arrius Antoninus II	(C.?) Calpurnius Piso
May?	M. Annius Verus	L. Neratius Priscus
Jul.?	L. Domitius Apollinaris	Sex. Hermentidius Campanus
Sep.?	L. Pomponius Maternus	Q. Glitius Atilius Agricola
Nov.?	P. Cornelius Tacitus	(?) L. Licinius Sura
98	Imp. Nerva Caesar Augustus IV	Imp. Caesar Nerva Trajanus II (Note: This is the name Trajan adopted following Nerva's death on 27 January. Trajan's name following his adoption in AD 97 was "M. Ulpius Nerva Trajanus"; he was named Caesar shortly after (Dio; 68.3–4), but the exact formula he adopted is not known.)
id. Jan.	Cn. Domitius Afer Curvius Tullus II	Imp. Caesar Nerva Trajanus II
1 Feb.	Sex. Julius Frontinus II	Imp. Caesar Nerva Trajanus II
1 Mar.	L. Julius Ursus II	Imp. Caesar Nerva Trajanus II
1 Apr.	T. Vestricius Spurinna II	Imp. Caesar Nerva Trajanus II
1 May	C. Pomponius Pius	Imp. Caesar Nerva Trajanus II
1 Jul.	A. Vicirius Martialis	L. Maecius Postumus
1 Sep.	C. Pomponius Rufus Acilius [Pri]scus Coelius Sparsus	Cn. Pompeius Ferox Licinianus
99	A. Cornelius Palma Frontonianus	Q. Sosius Senecio
suff.	P. Sulpicius Lucretius Barba (from 1 Apr. or 1 May)	Senecio Memmius Afer (from 1 Apr. or 1 May)
suff.	Q. Bittius Proculus (between 14 Sep. and 1 Oct.)	M. Ostorius Scapula
suff.	Q. Fabius Barbarus Valerius Magnus Julianus	A. Caecilius Faustinus
suff.	Ti. Julius Ferox	unidentified
100	Imp. Caesar Nerva Trajanus Augustus III	Sex. Julius Frontinus III
id. Jan.	L. Julius Ursus III	Sex. Julius Frontinus III
Mar.	M. Marcius Macer	C. Cilnius Proculus
May	L. Herennius Saturninus	Pomponius Mamilianus
Jul.	Q. Acutius Nerva	L. Fabius Tuscus
Sep.	C. Plinius Caecilius Secundus	C. Julius Cornutus Tertullus
Nov.	L. Roscius Aelianus Maecius Celer	Ti. Claudius Sacerdos Julianus

== Second century (101–200) ==
Year		
101	Imp. Caesar Nerva Trajanus Augustus IV (January)	Q. Articuleius Paetus II (January–March)
suff.	Sex. Attius Suburanus Aemilianus (February–March)	
suff.	C. Sertorius Brocchus Q. Servaeus Innocens (April–May)	M. Maecius Celer
suff.	[...]us Proculus (sometime between May and October)	ignotus
suff.	L. Arruntius Stella (attested October)	L. Julius Marinus Caecilius Simplex
102	L. Julius Ursus Servianus II (January–April)	L. Licinius Sura II (January–February)
suff.		L. Fabius Justus (March–April)
suff.	T. Didius Secundus (May–June)	L. Publilius Celsus
suff.	T.? Rubrius Gallus (July–August)	Galeo Tettienus Severus
suff.	L. Antonius Albus (November–December)	M. Junius Homullus
103	Imp. Caesar Nerva Trajanus Augustus V (January)	M'. Laberius Maximus II (January–March)
suff.	Q. Glitius Atilius Agricola II (January–March)	
suff.	P. Metilius Nepos (April–June)	Q. Baebius Macer
suff.	[? M. Flavius Ap]er (July–September)	C. Trebonius Proculus Mettius Modestus
suff.	(A?)nnius Mela (October–December)	P. Calpurnius Macer Caulius Rufus
104	Sex. Attius Suburanus Aemilianus II	M. Asinius Marcellus
suff.	Sex. Subrius Dexter Cornelius Priscus	Cn. C[---]ius Paullus Caesonianus
105	Ti. Julius Candidus Marius Celsus II (January–March)	C. Antius A. Julius Quadratus II
suff.	C. Julius Quadratus Bassus (May–August)	Cn. Afranius Dexter (May–15 July)
suff.		Q. Caelius Honoratus (July–August)
suff.	M. Vitorius Marcellus (September–December)	C. Caecilius Strabo
106	L. Ceionius Commodus	Sex. Vettulenus Civica Cerialis
suff.	L. Minicius Natalis	Q. Licinius Silvanus Granianus Quadronius Proculus
107	L. Licinius Sura III (January–February or April)	Q. Sosius Senecio II
suff.	Acilius Rufus (March–April)	
suff.	C. Minicius Fundanus (May–August)	C. Vettennius Severus
suff.	C. Julius Longinus (September–December)	C. Valerius Paullinus
108	Ap. Annius Trebonius Gallus (January–?)	M. Atilius Metilius Bradua
suff.	P. Aelius Hadrianus (attested 22 June)	M. Trebatius Priscus
suff.	Q. Pompeius Falco (attested 27 July)	M. Titius Lustricus Bruttianus
109	A. Cornelius Palma Frontonianus II (January–February)	P. Calvisius Tullus Ruso (January–April)
suff.	L. Annius Largus (March–April)	
suff.	Cn. Antonius Fuscus (May–August)	C. Julius Antiochus Epiphanes Philopappus
suff.	C. Aburnius Valens (September–December)	C. Julius Proculus
110	M. Peducaeus Priscinus (January–March)	Ser. Cornelius Scipio Salvidienus Orfitus
suff.	C. Avidius Nigrinus (April–June)	Ti. Julius Aquila Polemaeanus
suff.	L. Catilius Severus Julianus Claudius Reginus (July–September)	C. Erucianus Silo
suff.	A. Larcius Priscus (October–December)	Sex. Marcius Honoratus
111	C. Calpurnius Piso (January–April)	M. Vettius Bolanus
suff.	T. Avidius Quietus (May–August)	L. Eggius Marullus
suff.	L. Octavius Crassus (September–December)	P. Coelius Apollinaris
112	Imp. Caesar Nerva Trajanus Augustus VI (January)	T. Sextius Cornelius Africanus (January–March)
suff.	[M. ?] Licinius Ruso (January–March)	
suff.	Cn. Pinarius Cornelius Severus (April–June)	L. Mummius Niger Q. Valerius Vegetus
suff.	P. Stertinius Quartus (July–September)	T. Julius Maximus Manlianus Brocchus Servilianus
suff.	C. Claudius Severus (October–December)	T. Settidius Firmus
113	L. Publilius Celsus II (January)	C. Clodius Crispinus (January–April)
suff.	Ser. Cornelius Dolabella Metilianus Pompeius Marcellus (February–April)	
suff.	L. Stertinius Noricus (May–August)	L. Fadius Rufinus
suff.	Cn. Cornelius Urbicus (September–December)	T. Sempronius Rufus
114	Q. Ninnius Hasta (January–April)	P. Manilius Vopiscus Vicinillianus
suff.	C. Clodius Nummus (May–August)	L. Caesennius Sospes
suff.	L. Hedius Rufus Lollianus Avitus (September–December)	M. Messius Rusticus
115	L. Vipstanus Messalla (January–April)	M. Pedo Vergilianus (January)
suff.		T. Statilius Maximus Severus Hadrianus (February–April)
suff.	L. Julius Frugi (May–August)	P. Juventius Celsus
suff.	M. Pompeius Macrinus Neos Theophanes (September–December)	T. Vibius Varus
116	L. Fundanius Lamia Aelianus (January–March)	Sex. Carminius Vetus
suff.	Ti. Julius Secundus (April–June)	M. Egnatius Marcellinus
suff.	D. Terentius Gentianus (July–September)	L. Co[...]
suff.	L. Statius Aquila (October–December)	C. Julius Alexander Berenicianus
117	Q. Aquilius Niger (January–? March)	M. Rebilus Apronianus
suff.	L. Cossonius Gallus (attested 16 August)	P. Afranius Flavianus
118	Imp. Caesar Trajanus Hadrianus Augustus II (January–June)	Cn. Pedanius Fuscus Salinator (January–February)
suff.		Bellicius Tebanianus (March)
suff.		C. Ummidius Quadratus (attested May)
suff.	L. Pomponius Bassus (attested 9 July and 31 August)	T. Sabinius Barbarus
119	Imp. Caesar Traianus Hadrianus Augustus III (January–April)	P. Dasumius Rusticus (January–February)
suff.		A. Platorius Nepos (March–April)
suff.	M. Paccius Silvanus Q. Coredius Gallus Gargilius Antiquus (May–June)	Q. Vibius Gallus
suff.	C. Herennius Capella (November–December)	L. Coelius Rufus
120	L. Catilius Severus Julianus Claudius Reginus II	T. Aurelius Fulvus Boionius Antoninus
suff.	C. Quinctius Certus Poblicius Marcellus (May–June)	T. Rutilius Propinquus
suff.	C. Arminius Gallus (attested 19 October)	C. Atilius Serranus
121	M. Annius Verus II (January–February)	Cn. Arrius Augur
suff.	M. Herennius Faustus (March–April)	Q. Pomponius Marcellus
suff.	T. Pomponius Antistianus Funisulanus Vettonianus (May–June)	L. Pomponius Silvanus
suff.	M. Statorius Secundus (July–August)	L. Sempronius Merula Auspicatus
122	M'. Acilius Aviola	L. Corellius Neratius Pansa
suff.	Ti. Julius Candidus Capito (attested 17 July)	L. Vitrasius Flamininus
suff.	C. Trebius Maximus (attested 18 November)	T. Calestrius Tiro Orbius Speratus
123	Q. Articuleius Paetinus	L. Venuleius Apronianus Octavius Priscus
suff.	T. Prifernius Geminus (attested 16 June)	P. Metilius Secundus
suff.	T. Salvius Rufinus Minicius Opimianus (attested 10 August)	Cn. Sentius Aburnianus
124	M'. Acilius Glabrio (January–April)	C. Bellicius Flaccus Torquatus Tebanianus
suff.	A. Larcius Macedo (May–August)	P. Ducenius Verres
suff.	C. Julius Gallus (September–December)	C. Valerius Severus
125	M. Lollius Paulinus D. Valerius Asiaticus Saturninus II	L. Titius Epidius Aquilinus
suff.	Q. Vetina Verus (attested 1 June)	P. Lucius Cosconianus
126	M. Annius Verus III (January–February)	C. Eggius Ambibulus
suff.	L. Valerius Propinquus (From 1 March)	
suff.	L. Cuspius Camerinus (attested 1 July)	C. Saenius Severus
127	T. Atilius Rufus Titianus (January–March)	M. Gavius Squilla Gallicanus
suff.	P. Tullius Varro (April)	[D.?] Junius Paetus
suff.	Q. Tineius Rufus (May–September)	M. Licinius Celer Nepos
suff.	L. Aemilius Juncus (October–December)	Sex. Julius Severus
128	L. Nonius Calpurnius Torquatus Asprenas II (January)	M. Annius Libo (January–March)
suff.	L. Caesennius Antoninus (February–March)	
suff.	M. Junius Mettius Rufus (April–June)	Q. Pomponius Maternus
suff.	L. Valerius Flaccus (July–September)	M. [Junius Homullus ?]
suff.	A. Egrilius Plarianus (October–December)	Q. [Planius Sardus Varius Ambibulus ?]
129	P. Juventius Celsus II (January–after 22 March)	L. Neratius Marcellus II (January–? February)
suff.		Q. Julius Balbus (attested 22 March)
130	Q. Fabius Catullinus (January–February)	M. Flavius Aper
suff.	Cassius Agrippa (or Agrippinus) (attested 19 March)	Ti. Claudius Quartinus
131	Sergius Octavius Laenas Pontianus (January–April)	M. Antonius Rufinus
suff.	L. Fabius Gallus (May–August)	Q. Fabius Julianus
132	C. Junius Serius Augurinus (January–April)	C. Trebius Sergianus
suff.	C. Acilius Priscus (September–December)	A. Cassius Arrianus
133	M. Antonius Hiberus (January–April)	P. Mummius Sisenna
suff.	Q. Flavius Tertullus (May–August)	Q. Junius Rusticus
suff.	Ti. Claudius Atticus Herodes (September–December)	P. Sufenas Verus
134	L. Julius Ursus Servianus III (January–March)	T. Vibius Varus (January–April)
suff.	T. Haterius Nepos (attested 2 April)	
suff.	P. Licinius Pansa (attested September–December)	L. Attius Macro
135	L. Tutilius Lupercus Pontianus (January–April)	P. Calpurnius Atilianus (Atticus Rufus?)
suff.	M. Aemilius Papus (May–August)	L. Burbuleius Optatus Ligarianus
suff.	P. Rutilius Fabianus (September–December)	Cn. Papirius Aelianus Aemilius Tuscillus
136	L. Ceionius Commodus	Sex. Vettulenus Civica Pompeianus
137	L. Aelius Caesar II	P. Coelius Balbinus Vibullius Pius
138	Kanus Junius Niger	C. Pomponius Camerinus
1 Apr.	M. Vindius Verus	P. Pactumeius Clemens
1 Jul.	unidentified	unidentified
1 Oct.	P. Cassius Secundus	M. Nonius Mucianus
139	T. Aelius Hadrianus Antoninus Augustus Pius (Note: By this time, 'Imperator' 'Caesar' and 'Augustus' had become full imperial titles and were no longer treated as names. The titles "Caesar" and "Augustus" will still be included in order to better differentiate between emperors and heirs-apparents.) II	C. Bruttius Praesens L. Fulvius Rusticus II
May?	unidentified	unidentified
Jul.?	L. Minicius Natalis Quadronius Verus	L. Claudius Proculus
Sep.?	M. Salvius Carus	C. Julius Scapula
1 Nov.	M. Ceccius Justinus	C. Julius Bassus
140	T. Aelius Hadrianus Antoninus Augustus Pius III	M. Aelius Aurelius Verus Caesar
1 May	unidentified	unidentified
suff.	Julius Crassipes (between June and October)	unidentified
1 Nov.	M. Barbius Aemilianus	T. Flavius Julianus
141	T. Hoenius Severus	M. Peducaeus Stloga Priscinus
1 Mar.	unidentified	unidentified
1 May	C. Julius Pisibanus	[Larcius?] Lepidus
1 Jul.	unidentified	unidentified
1 Sep.	M. Vettius Valens	Ti. Claudius Saturninus
1 Nov.	unidentified	unidentified
142	L. Cuspius Pactumeius Rufinus	L. Statius Quadratus
1 Apr.	L. Granius Castus	Ti. Junius Julianus
1 Jul.	M. Cornelius Fronto	C. Laberius Priscus
1 Sep.	L. Tusidius Campester	Q. Cornelius Senecio Annianus
1 Nov.	[Sulpicius?] Julianus	[Ti. Julius? Castus]
143	C. Bellicius Flaccus Torquatus	Ti. Claudius Atticus Herodes
1 Apr.	unidentified	unidentified
1 Jul.	Q. Junius Calamus	M. Valerius Junianus
1 Oct.	unidentified	unidentified
144	L. Hedius Rufus Lollianus Avitus	T. Statilius Maximus
1 Mar.	L. Aemilius Carus	Q. Egrilius Plarianus
Jul.?	unidentified	Q. Laberius Licinianus
1 Oct.	L. Marcius Celer M. Calpurnius Longus	D. Velius Fidus
145	T. Aelius Hadrianus Antoninus Augustus Pius IV	M. Aelius Aurelius Verus Caesar II
Mar.?	L. Plautius Lamia Silvanus	L. Poblicola Priscus
1 May	Cn. Arrius Cornelius Proculus	D. Junius [Paetus?]
1 Jul.	Q. Mustius Priscus	M. Pontius Laelianus
1 Sep.	L. Petronius Sabinus	C. Vicrius Rufus
1 Nov.	C. Fadius Rufus	P. Vicrius
146	Sex. Erucius Clarus II	Cn. Claudius Severus Arabianus
Mar.	Q. Licinius Modestinus (Sex.?) Attius Labeo	
1 May	P. Mummius Sisenna Rutilianus	T. Prifernius Paetus Rosianus Geminus
1 Jul.	Cn. Terentius Homullus Iunior	L. Aurelius Gallus
1 Sep.	Q. Voconius Saxa Fidus	C. Annianus Verus
1 Nov.	L. Aemilius Longus	Q. Cornelius Proculus
147	C. Prastina Messalinus	L. Annius Largus
1 Apr.	A. Claudius Charax	Q. Fuficius Cornutus
1 Jul.	Cupressenus Gallus	Q. Cornelius Quadratus
1 Oct.	Sex. Cocceius Severianus Honorinus	Ti. Licinius Cassius Cassianus
suff.		C. Popilius Carus Pedo
148	P. Salvius Julianus	C. Bellicius Calpurnius Torquatus
1 Apr.	Satyrius Firmus	C. Salvius Capito
1 Jul.	L. Coelius Festus	P. Orfidius Senecio
Oct.?	C. Fabius Agrippinus	M. Antonius Zeno
149	L. Sergius Salvidienus Scipio Orfitus	Q. Pompeius Sosius Priscus
Jul.?	Q. Passienus Licinus	C. Julius Avitus
150	M. Gavius Squilla Gallicanus	Sex. Carminius Vetus
Apr.?	[…]mus	C. La[berius Priscus?]
Jul.?	M. Cassius Apollinaris	M. Petronius Mamertinus
Oct.	C. Curtius Justus	C. Julius Julianus
151	Sex. Quintilius Condianus	Sex. Quintilius Valerius Maximus
1 Apr.	Arrius Severus	[Caelius?] Flavus
1 Jul.	M. Cominius Secundus	L. Attidius Cornelianus
152	M'. Acilius Glabrio Cn. Cornelius Severus	M. Valerius Homullus
1 Apr.	P. Sufenas Severus	L. Dasumius Tullius Tuscus
1 Jul.	C. Novius Priscus	L. Julius Romulus
1 Oct.	P. Cluvius Maximus Paulinus	M. Servilius Silanus
153	L. Fulvius Rusticus C. Bruttius Praesens	A. Junius Rufinus
1 Apr.	[? Sex. Caecilius / C. Julius Max]imus	M. Pontius Sabinus
1 Jul.	P. Septimius Aper	M. Sedatius Severianus
1 Oct.	C. Cattius Marcellus	Q. Petiedius Gallus
154	L. Aelius Aurelius Commodus	T. Sextius Lateranus
1 Apr.	[Prifernius?] Paetus	M. Nonius Macrinus
1 Jul.	[? M. Valerius Etrus]cus (?)	L. [Aemilius Iuncus?]
1 Sep.	Ti. Claudius Julianus	Sex. Calpurnius Agricola
1 Nov.	C. Julius Statius Severus	T. Junius Severus
155	C. Julius Severus	M. Junius Rufinus Sabinianus
Apr.?	C. Aufidius Victorinus	M. Gavius [Appalius Maximus?]
Nov.	Antius Pollio	Minicius Opimianus
Dec.	[D. Rupilius?] Severus	L. Julius T. Statilius Severus
156	M. Ceionius Silvanus	C. Serius Augurinus
Mar.?	A. Avillius Urinatius Quadratus	Strabo Aemilianus
Nov.?	Q. Canusius Praenestinus	C. Lusius Sparsus
157	M. Vettulenus Civica Barbarus	M. Metilius Aquillius Regulus
1 Apr.	L. Roscius Aelianus	Cn. Papirius Aelianus
Jul.?	C. Julius Commodus Orfitianus	C. Caelius Secundus
Oct.?	Q. V[…]su[…]clus	Q. […]inus
158	Sex. Sulpicius Tertullus	Q. Tineius Sacerdos Clemens
Jul.?	M. Servilius Fabianus Maximus	Q. Iallius Bassus
Sep.?	Q. Pomponius Musa	L. Cassius Juvenalis
159	Plautius Quintillus	M. Statius Priscus Licinius Italicus
1 Apr.	M. Pisibanius Lepidus	L. Matuccius Fuscinus
1 Jul.	P. Cornelius Dexter	unidentified
1 Oct.	A. Curtius Crispinus	unidentified
160	Ap. Annius Atilius Bradua	T. Clodius Vibius Varus
1 Mar.	A. Platorius Nepos Calpurnianus	M. Postumius Festus
May?	[C. Septimius? S]everus	[…] Flavus
Jul.?	C. Prastina Pacatus	M. Censorius Paullus
Oct.?	Ti. Oclatius Severus	[Q.?] Ninnius Hastianus
suff.		[… N]ovius Sabinianus (attested 18 December)
161	M. Aelius Aurelius Verus Caesar III	L. Aelius Aurelius Commodus II
suff.	M. Annius Libo (attested 8 February–26 April)	Q. Camurius Numisius Junior
Oct.?	(?) Julius Geminus Capellianus	T. Flavius Boethus
162	Q. Junius Rusticus II	L. Titius Plautius Aquilinus
suff.	Ti. Claudius Paullinus (attested 23 August)	Ti. Claudius Pompeianus
suff.	D. Fonteius Frontinianus L. Stertinius Rufus	ignotus
suff.	M. Insteius Bithynicus	ignotus
163	M. Pontius Laelianus	A. Junius Pastor L. Caesennius Sospes
164	M. Pompeius Macrinus	P. Juventius Celsus
suff.	Ti. Haterius Saturninus (attested 19 and 21 July)	Q. Caecilius Avitus
165	M. Gavius Orfitus	L. Arrius Pudens
166	Q. Servilius Pudens	L. Fufidius Pollio
suff.	M. Vibius Liberalis (attested 23 March)	P. Martius Verus
167	L. Aurelius Verus Augustus III	M. Ummidius Quadratus
suff.	Q. Caecilius Dentilianus (attested 5 May)	M. Antonius Pallas
168	L. Venuleius Apronianus Octavius Priscus II	L. Sergius Paullus II
suff.	Q. Tullius Maximus	ignotus
169	Q. Pompeius Senecio Sosius Priscus	P. Coelius Apollinaris
170	C. Erucius Clarus	M. Gavius Cornelius Cethegus
suff.	T. Hoenius Severus	ignotus
171	T. Statilius Severus	L. Alfidius Herennianus
172	Ser. Calpurnius Scipio Orfitus	Sex. Quintilius Maximus
suff.	C. Modius Justus	ignotus
173	Cn. Claudius Severus II	Ti. Claudius Pompeianus II
174	L. Aurelius Gallus	Q. Volusius Flaccus Cornelianus
suff.	M. Aemilius Macer Saturninus	ignotus
175	L. Calpurnius Piso	P. Salvius Julianus
suff.	P. Helvius Pertinax	M. Didius Severus Julianus
176	T. Pomponius Proculus Vitrasius Pollio II	M. Flavius Aper II
177	L. Aelius Aurelius Commodus Caesar	M. Peducaeus Plautius Quintillus
178	Ser. Cornelius Scipio Salvidienus Orfitus	D. Velius Rufus (Julianus?)
179	L. Aelius Aurelius Commodus Augustus II	P. Martius Verus II
suff.	T. Flavius Claudianus (attested 21 March)	L. Aemilius Iuncus
suff.	M'. Acilius Faustinus (attested 1 April)	L. Julius Proculianus
180	L. Fulvius Rusticus C. Bruttius Praesens II	Sex. Quintilius Condianus
181	L. Aelius Aurelius Commodus Augustus III	L. Antistius Burrus
182	M. Petronius Sura Mamertinus	Q. Tineius Rufus
suff.	(?) Aurelianus (attested 15 May)	(L. Attidius?) Cornelianus
183	M. Aurelius Commodus Antoninus Augustus IV	C. Aufidius Victorinus II
suff.	L. Tutilius Pontianus Gentianus (attested 8 February)	ignotus
suff.	M. Herennius Secundus (attested 13 and 20 May)	M. Egnatius Postumus
suff.	T. Pactumeius Magnus (after 20 May)	L. Septimius Flaccus
184	L. Cossonius Eggius Marullus	Cn. Papirius Aelianus
suff.	C. Octavius Vindex (attested 18 May)	Cassius Apronianus
185	Triarius Maternus Lascivius	Ti. Claudius M. Ap. Atilius Bradua Regillus Atticus
186	M. Aurelius Commodus Antoninus Augustus V	M'. Acilius Glabrio II
suff.	L. Novius Rufus (attested 25 May)	L. Annius Ravus
suff.	C. Sabucius Maior Caecilianus (attested 24 and 27 Nov.)	Valerius Senecio
187	L. Bruttius Quintius Crispinus	L. Roscius Aelianus Paculus
188	P. Seius Fuscianus II	M. Servilius Silanus II
189	Dulius Silanus	Q. Servilius Silanus
suff.	Severus (attested 27 May)	Vitellius
190	M. Aurelius Commodus Antoninus Augustus VI	M. Petronius Sura Septimianus
suff.	L. Septimius Severus (May–?)	Apuleius Rufinus
191	Popilius Pedo Apronianus	M. Valerius Bradua Mauricus
192	L. Aelius Aurelius Commodus Augustus VII	P. Helvius Pertinax II
193	Q. Pompeius Sosius Falco	C. Julius Erucius Clarus Vibianus
suff.	Q. Tineius Sacerdos (March)	P. Julius Scapula Priscus
suff.	M. Silius Messala (May)	ignotus
suff.	L. Julius Messala Rutilianus (July)	C. Aemilius Severus Cantabrinus
suff.	L. Fabius Cilo	
194	L. Septimius Severus Pertinax Augustus II	D. Clodius Septimius Albinus Augustus (Gaul)
suff.	C. Gabinius Barbarus Pompeianus	ignotus
195	P. Julius Scapula Tertullus Priscus	Q. Tineius Clemens
196	C. Domitius Dexter II	L. Valerius Messalla Thrasea Priscus
197	T. Sextius Magius Lateranus	Cuspius Rufinus
198	P. Martius Sergius Saturninus	L. Aurelius Gallus
suff.	Q. Anicius Faustus	ignotus
199	P. Cornelius Anullinus II	M. Aufidius Fronto
200	Ti. Claudius Severus Proculus	C. Aufidius Victorinus

== Third century (201–300) ==
Unless otherwise indicated, the names and dates of the consuls after 284 are taken from Roger S. Bagnall's Consuls of the Later Roman Empire. See also the list of consuls in the Prosopography of the Later Roman Empire.

Year		
201	L. Annius Fabianus	M. Nonius Arrius Mucianus
202	L. Septimius Severus Pertinax Augustus III	M. Aurelius Antoninus Augustus
suff.	T. Murrenius Severus	C. Cassius Regallianus
suff.	Q. Caecilius Speratianus	L. Clodius Pompeianus
203	C. Fulvius Plautianus	P. Septimius Geta II
204	L. Fabius Cilo Septiminus Catinius Acilianus Lepidus Fulcinianus II	M. Annius Flavius Libo
suff.	L. Pomponius Liberalis	ignotus
205	M. Aurelius Antoninus Augustus II	P. Septimius Geta Caesar
206	M. Nummius Umbrius Primus Senecio Albinus	L. Fulvius Gavius Numisius Petronius Aemilianus
suff.	P. Tullius Marsus (attested 10 December)	M. Caelius Faustinus
207	L. Annius Maximus	C. Septimius Severus Aper
208	M. Aurelius Antoninus Augustus III	P. Septimius Geta Caesar II
209	L. Aurelius Commodus Pompeianus	Q. Hedius Lollianus Plautius Avitus
210	M'. Acilius Faustinus	A. Triarius Rufinus
211	Hedius Lollianus Terentius Gentianus	Pomponius Bassus
212	C. Julius Asper II	C. Julius Camilius Asper
suff.	(Cn. Claudius ?) Severus (May–June)	Tiberius Claudius Pompeianus Quintianus
213	M. Aurelius Severus Antoninus Augustus IV	D. Caelius Calvinus Balbinus II
214	L. Valerius Messalla	C. Octavius Appius Suetrius Sabinus
215	Q. Maecius Laetus II	M. Munatius Sulla Cerialis
216	P. Catius Sabinus II	P. Cornelius Anullinus
217	C. Bruttius Praesens	T. Messius Extricatus II
218	M. Opellius Severus Macrinus Augustus II	M. Oclatinius Adventus
suff.	M. Aurelius Antoninus Augustus (from 8 June)	
219	M. Aurelius Antoninus Augustus II	Q. Tineius Sacerdos II
220	M. Aurelius Antoninus Augustus III	P. Valerius Comazon
221	C. Vettius Gratus Sabinianus	M. Flavius Vitellius Seleucus
222	M. Aurelius Antoninus Augustus IV	M. Aurelius Alexander Caesar
223	L. Marius Maximus Perpetuus Aurelianus II	L. Roscius Aelianus Paculus Salvius Julianus
224	Ap. Claudius Julianus II	C. Bruttius Crispinus
225	Ti. Manilius Fuscus II	Ser. Calpurnius Domitius Dexter
226	M. Aurelius Severus Alexander Augustus II	C. Aufidius Marcellus II
227	M. Nummius Senecio Albinus	M. Laelius Fulvius Maximus Aemilianus
228	Q. Aiacius Modestus Crescentianus II	M. Pomponius Maecius Probus
229	M. Aurelius Severus Alexander Augustus III	L. Cassius Dio
230	L. Virius Agricola	Sex. Catius Clementinus Priscillianus
231	L. Ti. Claudius Pompeianus	T. Flavius Sallustius Paelignianus
232	L. Virius Lupus Julianus	L. Marius Maximus Aurelianus
233	L. Valerius Maximus Acilius Priscillianus	Cn. Cornelius Paternus
234	M. Clodius Pupienus Maximus II	M. Munatius Sulla Urbanus
235	Cn. Claudius Severus	L. Ti. Claudius Quintianus
236	C. Julius Verus Maximinus Augustus	M. Pupienus Africanus Maximus
237	L. Marius Perpetuus	L. Mummius Felix Cornelianus
238	C. Fulvius Pius	Q. Pontius Proculus Pontianus
239	M. Antonius Gordianus Augustus	M'. Acilius Aviola
240	C. Octavius Appius Suetrius Sabinus II	L. Ragonius Venustus
241	M. Antonius Gordianus Augustus II	Clodius Pompeianus
242	C. Vettius Gratus Atticus Sabinianus	C. Asinius Lepidus Praetextatus
243	L. Annius Arrianus	C. Cervonius Papus
244	Ti. Pollienus Armenius Peregrinus	Fulvius Aemilianus
245	M. Julius Philippus Augustus	C. Maesius Titianus
246	C. Bruttius Praesens	C. Allius Albinus
247	M. Julius Philippus Augustus II	M. Julius Severus Philippus Caesar
248	M. Julius Philippus Augustus III	M. Julius Severus Philippus Augustus II
249	L. Fulvius Gavius Numisius Aemilianus II	L. Naevius Aquilinus
250	C. Messius Quintus Trajanus Decius Augustus II	Vettius Gratus
251	C. Messius Quintus Trajanus Decius Augustus III	Q. Herennius Etruscus Messius Decius Caesar
252	C. Vibius Trebonianus Gallus Augustus II	C. Vibius Volusianus Augustus
253	C. Vibius Volusianus Augustus II	L. Valerius Poplicola Balbinus Maximus
254	P. Licinius Valerianus Augustus II	P. Licinius Gallienus Augustus
255	P. Licinius Valerianus Augustus III	P. Licinius Gallienus Augustus II
256	L. Valerius Maximus . . . Acilius Priscillianus II	M. Acilius Glabrio
257	P. Licinius Valerianus Augustus IV	P. Licinius Gallienus Augustus III
258	M. Nummius Tuscus	Mummius Bassus
259	Aemilianus	Pomponius Bassus
260	P. Cornelius Saecularis II	C. Junius Donatus II
260	Gaul: M. Cassianius Latinius Postumus Augustus	Honoratianus
261	P. Licinius Gallienus Augustus IV	L. Petronius Taurus Volusianus
261	Gaul: M. Cassianius Latinius Postumus Augustus II	
262	P. Licinius Gallienus Augustus V	Nummius Faus(t?)ianus
262	Gaul: M. Cassianius Latinius Postumus Augustus II	
263	M. Nummius Albinus II	Dexter (Maximus?)
264	P. Licinius Gallienus Augustus VI	Saturninus
265	Licinius Valerianus II	Lucillus
266	P. Licinius Gallienus Augustus VII	Sabinillus
267	Ovinius C. Julius Aquilius Paternus	Arcesilaus
267	Gaul: M. Cassianius Latinius Postumus Augustus IV	M. Piavonius Victorinus
268	Aspasius Paternus II	(Egnatius/Licinius) Marinianus
269	M. Aurelius Claudius (Gothicus) Augustus	Paternus
269	Gaul: M. Cassianius Latinius Postumus Augustus V	M. Piavonius Victorinus II
270	Flavius Antiochianus II	Virius Orfitus
271	L. Domitius Aurelianus Augustus	Pomponius Bassus II
271	Gaul: C. Pius Esuvius Tetricus Augustus	
272	T. Flavius Postumius Quietus	Junius Veldumnianus
272	Gaul: C. Pius Esuvius Tetricus Augustus II	
273	A. Caecina Tacitus or M. Claudius Tacitus	Julius Placidianus
274	L. Domitius Aurelianus Augustus II	Capitolinus
274	Gaul: C. Pius Esuvius Tetricus Augustus III	
275	L. Domitius Aurelianus Augustus III	(Aurelius?) Marcellinus
276	M. Claudius Tacitus Augustus II	(Fulvius?) Aemilianus
277	M. Aurelius Probus Augustus	(L. Julius?) Paulinus
278	M. Aurelius Probus Augustus II	Virius Lupus
279	M. Aurelius Probus Augustus III	Nonius Paternus II
280	(L. Valerius?) Messalla	(Vettius?) Gratus
281	M. Aurelius Probus Augustus IV	Junius Tiberianus
282	M. Aurelius Probus Augustus V	Victorinus
283	M. Aurelius Carus Augustus II	M. Aurelius Carinus Augustus
284	M. Aurelius Carinus Augustus II	M. Aurelius Numerianus Augustus
suff.	C. Valerius Diocletianus Augustus	(L. Caesonius?) Bassus
285	M. Aurelius Carinus Augustus III	T. Claudius Aurelius Aristobulus
285	C. Valerius Diocletianus Augustus II	T. Claudius Aurelius Aristobulus
286	M. Junius Maximus II	Vettius Aquilinus
287	C. Aurelius Valerius Diocletianus Augustus III	M. Aurelius Valerius Maximianus Augustus
288	M. Aurelius Valerius Maximianus Augustus II	Pomponius Januarianus
suff.	(...)a	(...)ivianus
289	M. Magrius Bassus (January–June)	L. Ragonius Quintianus (January–June)
suff.	M. Umbrius Primus (July–August)	T. Flavius Coelianus (July–August)
suff.	Ceionius Proculus (September–October)	Helvius Clemens (September–October)
suff.	Flavius Decimus (November–December)	... ninius Maximus (November–December)
290	C. Aurelius Valerius Diocletianus Augustus IV	M. Aurelius Valerius Maximianus Augustus III
291	C. Junius Tiberianus II	Cassius Dio
292	Afranius Hannibalianus	Julius Asclepiodotus
293	C. Aurelius Valerius Diocletianus Augustus V	M. Aurelius Valerius Maximianus Augustus IV
294	M. Flavius Valerius Constantius Caesar	C. Galerius Valerius Maximianus Caesar
295	Nummius Tuscus	C. Annius Anullinus
296	C. Aurelius Valerius Diocletianus Augustus VI	M. Flavius Valerius Constantius Caesar II
297	M. Aurelius Valerius Maximianus Augustus V	C. Galerius Valerius Maximianus Caesar II
298	Anicius Faustus II	Virius Gallus
299	C. Aurelius Valerius Diocletianus Augustus VII	M. Aurelius Valerius Maximianus Augustus VI
300	M. Flavius Valerius Constantius Caesar III	C. Galerius Valerius Maximianus Caesar III

== Fourth century (301–395) ==
Year		
301	T. Flavius Postumius Titianus II	Virius Nepotianus
302	M. Flavius Valerius Constantius Caesar IV	C. Galerius Valerius Maximianus Caesar IV
303	C. Aurelius Valerius Diocletianus Augustus VIII	M. Aurelius Valerius Maximianus Augustus VII
304	C. Aurelius Valerius Diocletianus Augustus IX	M. Aurelius Valerius Maximianus Augustus VIII
305	M. Flavius Valerius Constantius Caesar V	C. Galerius Valerius Maximianus Caesar V
306	M. Flavius Valerius Constantius Augustus VI	C. Galerius Valerius Maximianus Augustus VI
307	(a) Flavius Valerius Severus Augustus (until Sept.)	Galerius Valerius Maximinus Caesar
307	(b) M. Aurelius Valerius Maximianus Augustus IX (Italy)	Flavius Valerius Constantinus Caesar
307	(c) C. Galerius Valerius Maximianus Augustus VII (until Apr.)	Galerius Valerius Maximinus Caesar (until Apr.)
308	(a) C. Aurelius Valerius Diocletianus X	C. Galerius Valerius Maximianus Augustus VII
308	(b) M. Aurelius Valerius Maximianus Augustus X	C. Galerius Valerius Maximianus Augustus VII
308	(c) M. Aurelius Valerius Maxentius Augustus (from Apr.)	(M. Aurelius Valerius) Romulus (from Apr.)
309	East: Valerius Licinianus Licinius Augustus	Flavius Valerius Constantinus Caesar
309	Italy: M. Aurelius Valerius Maxentius Augustus II	M. Aurelius Valerius Romulus II
310	East: Tatius Andronicus	Pompeius Probus
310	Italy: M. Aurelius Valerius Maxentius Augustus III	
311	C. Galerius Valerius Maximianus Augustus VIII	Galerius Valerius Maximinus Augustus II
311	Italy: C. Ceionius Rufius Volusianus (from Sep.)	Rufinus (from Sep.)
312	Flavius Valerius Constantinus Augustus II	Valerius Licinianus Licinius Augustus II
312	Italy: M. Aurelius Valerius Maxentius Augustus IV	
313	Flavius Valerius Constantinus Augustus III	Galerius Valerius Maximinus Augustus III (until July)
suff.	Flavius Valerius Constantinus Augustus III	Valerius Licinianus Licinius Augustus III
314	C. Ceionius Rufius Volusianus (II)	Petronius Annianus
315	Flavius Valerius Constantinus Augustus IV	Valerius Licinianus Licinius Augustus IV
316	Antonius Caecina Sabinus	C. Vettius Cossinius Rufinus
317	Ovinius Gallicanus	Caesonius Bassus
318	Valerius Licinianus Licinius Augustus V	Flavius Julius Crispus Caesar
319	Flavius Valerius Constantinus Augustus V	Valerius Licinianus Licinius Caesar
320	Flavius Valerius Constantinus Augustus VI	Flavius Claudius Constantinus Caesar
321	West: Flavius Julius Crispus Caesar II	Flavius Claudius Constantinus Caesar II
321	East: Valerius Licinianus Licinius Augustus VI	Valerius Licinianus Licinius Caesar II
322	West: Petronius Probianus	Amnius Anicius Julianus
323	West: Acilius Severus	Vettius Rufinus
324	Flavius Julius Crispus Caesar III	Flavius Claudius Constantinus Caesar III
325	Valerius Proculus (January–May)	Sex. Anicius Paulinus
suff.	Julius Julianus (May–December)	
326	Flavius Valerius Constantinus Augustus VII	Flavius Julius Constantius Caesar
327	Flavius Constantius	Valerius Maximus
328	Flavius Januarinus	Vettius Justus
329	Flavius Valerius Constantinus Augustus VIII	Flavius Claudius Constantinus Caesar IV
330	Gallicanus	Aurelius Valerius Symmachus Tullianus
331	Junius Bassus	Ablabius
332	L. Papius Pacatianus	Mecilius Hilarianus
333	Flavius Dalmatius	Domitius Zenofilus
334	Optatus	Amnius Manius Caesonius Nicomachus Anicius Paulinus
335	Julius Constantius	Ceionius Rufius Albinus
336	Nepotianus	Tettius Facundus
337	Felicianus	Fabius Titianus
338	Ursus	Polemius
339	Flavius Julius Constantius Augustus II	Flavius Julius Constans Augustus
340	Septimius Acindynus	L. Aradius Valerius Proculus
341	Antonius Marcellinus	Petronius Probinus
342	Flavius Julius Constantius Augustus III	Flavius Julius Constans Augustus II
343	M. Maecius Memmius Furius Baburius Caecilianus Placidus	Romulus
344	Domitius Leontius	(a) Bonosus
344	Domitius Leontius	(b) Julius Sallustius
345	Amantius	M. Nummius Albinus
346	Flavius Julius Constantius Augustus IV	Flavius Julius Constans Augustus III
347	Vulcacius Rufinus	Eusebius
348	Philippus	Salia
349	Ulpius Limenius	Aconius Catullinus
350	Sergius	Nigrinianus
351	West: Magnus Magnentius Augustus	Gaiso
351	East: post consulatum Sergii et Nigriniani	
352	West: Magnus Decentius Caesar	Paulus
352	East: Flavius Julius Constantius Augustus V	Flavius Claudius Constantius Caesar
353	Flavius Julius Constantius Augustus VI	Flavius Claudius Constantius Caesar II
354	Flavius Julius Constantius Augustus VII	Flavius Claudius Constantius Caesar III
355	Arbitio	Q. Flavius Maesius Egnatius Lollianus
356	Flavius Julius Constantius Augustus VIII	Flavius Claudius Julianus Caesar
357	Flavius Julius Constantius Augustus IX	Flavius Claudius Julianus Caesar II
358	Censorius Datianus	Neratius Cerealis
359	Eusebius	Hypatius
360	Flavius Julius Constantius Augustus X	Flavius Claudius Julianus Caesar III
361	Taurus	Florentius
362	Claudius Mamertinus	Nevitta
363	Flavius Claudius Julianus Augustus IV	Sallustius
364	Jovianus Augustus	Varronianus
365	Valentinianus Augustus	Valens Augustus
366	Gratianus	Dagalaifus
367	Lupicinus	Jovinus
368	Valentinianus Augustus II	Valens Augustus II
369	Valentinianus (Galates)	Victor
370	Valentinianus Augustus III	Valens Augustus III
371	Gratianus Augustus II	Sex. Claudius Petronius Probus
372	Domitius Modestus	Arintheus
373	Valentinianus Augustus IV	Valens Augustus IV
374	Gratianus Augustus III	Equitius
375	post consulatum Gratiani Augusti III et Equitii	
376	Valens Augustus V	Valentinianus (junior) Augustus
377	Gratianus Augustus IV	Merobaudes
378	Valens Augustus VI	Valentinianus (junior) Augustus II
379	Decimius Magnus Ausonius	Q. Clodius Hermogenianus Olybrius
380	Gratianus Augustus V	Theodosius Augustus
381	Syagrius (western)	Eucherius (eastern)
382	Claudius Antonius	Afranius Syagrius
383	Merobaudes II	Saturninus
384	Ricomer	Clearchus
384	Gaul: Magnus Maximus Augustus	
385	Arcadius Augustus	Bauto
386	Honorius	Euodius
387	Valentinianus Augustus III	Eutropius
388	West: Merobaudes III? (until 10 January?)	Unknown colleague?
388	West: Magnus Maximus Augustus II	
388	East: Theodosius Augustus II	Maternus Cynegius
389	Timasius	Promotus
390	Valentinianus Augustus IV	Neoterius
391	Eutolmius Tatianus	Q. Aurelius Symmachus
392	Arcadius Augustus II	Rufinus
393	Theodosius Augustus III	West: Eugenius Augustus
393	Theodosius Augustus III	East: Abundantius
394	West: Virius Nicomachus Flavianus	
394	East: Arcadius Augustus III	Honorius Augustus II
395	Anicius Hermogenianus Olybrius	Anicius Probinus

== Until the fall of the Western Empire (396–480) ==
In 395, the Roman Empire was permanently divided into a Western Roman Empire and an Eastern Roman Empire. The separate courts often appointed a consul each, which sometimes led to one consul not being recognized by the other. The order of the names also varied at times depending on the sources, with the western consul appearing as the consul prior in western sources while being listed as the consul posterior in eastern sources, and viceversa. Western consuls continued to be appointed after the fall of the Western Roman Empire in 476.

Year		
396	Arcadius Augustus IV	Honorius Augustus III
397	Caesarius	Nonius Atticus
398	Honorius Augustus IV	Eutychianus
399	Mallius Theodorus (western)	Eutropius (East only, until August)
400	Stilicho	Aurelianus (East only)
401	Vincentius	Fravitta
402	Arcadius Augustus V	Honorius Augustus V
403	Theodosius Augustus	Rumoridus
404	Honorius Augustus VI	Aristaenetus (East only)
405	Stilicho II	Anthemius (East only)
406	Arcadius Augustus VI	Anicius Petronius Probus
407	Honorius Augustus VII	Theodosius Augustus II
408	Anicius Auchenius Bassus	Philippus
409	Honorius Augustus VIII	Theodosius Augustus III
409	Honorius Augustus VIII	Gaul: Fl. Claudius Constantinus Augustus
410	Varanes (under Honorius and Theodosius II)	
410	Tertullus (under Priscus Attalus)	
411	Theodosius Augustus IV	
412	Honorius Augustus IX	Theodosius Augustus V
413	Heraclianus	Lucius
414	Constantius	Constans
415	Honorius Augustus X	Theodosius Augustus VI
416	Theodosius Augustus VII	Junius Quartus Palladius
417	Honorius Augustus XI	Constantius II
418	Honorius Augustus XII	Theodosius Augustus VIII
419	Monaxius	Plinta
420	Theodosius Augustus IX	Constantius III
421	Agricola (western)	Eustathius (eastern)
422	Honorius Augustus XIII	Theodosius Augustus X
423	Avitus Marinianus (western)	Asclepiodotus (eastern)
424	Castinus (West only)	Victor (East only)
425	West: Johannes Augustus	
425	East: Theodosius Augustus XI	Placidus Valentinianus Caesar
426	Theodosius Augustus XII	Placidus Valentinianus Augustus II
427	Hierius	Ardabur
428	Felix	Taurus
429	Florentius	Dionysius
430	Theodosius Augustus XIII	Placidus Valentinianus Augustus III
431	Anicius Auchenius Bassus (western)	Antiochus (eastern)
432	Aetius (western)	Valerius (eastern)
433	Theodosius Augustus XIV	Petronius Maximus
434	Ardabur Aspar (western)	Areobindus (eastern)
435	Theodosius Augustus XV	Placidus Valentinianus Augustus IV
436	Anthemius Isidorus	Senator
437	Aetius II	Sigisvultus
438	Theodosius Augustus XVI	Anicius Acilius Glabrio Faustus
439	Theodosius Augustus XVII	Festus
440	Placidus Valentinianus Augustus V	Anatolius
441	Taurus Seleucus Cyrus	
442	Dioscorus (western)	Eudoxius (eastern)
443	Petronius Maximus II	Paterius
444	Theodosius Augustus XVIII	Caecina Decius Aginatius Albinus
445	Placidus Valentinianus Augustus VI	Nomus
446	Aetius III	Q. Aurelius Symmachus
447	Calepius (western)	Ardabur (eastern)
448	Rufius Praetextatus Postumianus (western)	Zeno (eastern)
449	Astyrius (western)	Florentius Romanus Protogenes (eastern)
450	Placidus Valentinianus Augustus VII	Gennadius Avienus
451	Marcianus Augustus (East only)	Valerius Faltonius Adelfius (West only)
452	Bassus Herculanus (West only)	Sporacius (East only)
453	Opilio (western)	Joannes Vincomalus (East only)
454	Aetius	Studius
455	Placidus Valentinianus Augustus VIII	Procopius Anthemius
456	West: Eparchius Avitus Augustus	
456	East: Varanes	Johannes
457	Constantinus	Rufus
458	Leo Augustus	Julius Valerius Majorianus Augustus (West only)
459	Ricimer (West only)	Patricius (East only)
460	Magnus (western)	Apollonius (eastern)
461	Severinus (western)	Dagalaifus (eastern)
462	Leo Augustus II (East only)	Libius Severus Augustus (West only)
463	Caecina Decius Basilius (West only)	Antoninus Messala Vivianus (East only)
464	Rusticius	Anicius Olybrius
465	Hermenericus (western)	Basiliscus (eastern)
466	Leo Augustus III	Tatianus (?)
467	Pusaeus	Johannes
468	Procopius Anthemius Augustus II	
469	Marcianus (western)	Zeno (eastern)
470	Messius Phoebus Severus (western)	Jordanes (eastern)
471	Leo Augustus IV	Caelius Aconius Probianus
472	Rufius Postumius Festus (western)	Marcianus (eastern)
473	Leo Augustus V	
474	Leo (junior) Augustus	
475	Zeno Augustus II	
476	Basiliscus Augustus II	Armatus
477	post consulatum Basilisci Augusti II et Armati	
478	Illus	
479	Zeno Augustus III	
480	Caecina Decius Maximus Basilius	

== After the fall of the Western Empire (481–541) ==
Year	Western consul	Eastern consul
481	Rufius Achilius Maecius Placidus	sine collega
482	Severinus	Appalius Illus Trocundes
483	Anicius Acilius Aginantius Faustus	post consulatum Trocundi
484	Decius Marius Venantius Basilius	Theodericus
485	Q. Aurelius Memmius Symmachus	post consulatum Theoderici
486	Caecina Mavortius Basilius Decius	Longinus
487	Nar. Manlius Boëthius	post consulatum Longini
488	Claudius Julius Ecclesius Dynamius	II post consulatum Longini
	Rufius Achilius Sividius	
489	Petronius Probinus	Eusebius
490	Anicius Probus Faustus	Longinus II
491	Olybrius	sine collega
492	Rufus (eastern)	Anastasius Augustus
493	Caecina Decius Faustus Albinus	Eusebius II
494	Turcius Rufius Apronianus Asterius	post consulatum Eusebii II
	Praesidius	
495	Viator	sine collega
496	post consulatum Viatoris	Paulus
497	II post consulatum Viatoris	Anastasius Augustus II
498	Paulinus	Johannes Scytha
499	post consulatum Paulini	Johannes qui est Gibbus
500	II post consulatum Paulini	Patricius
	Hypatius	
501	Avienus	Pompeius
502	Rufius Magnus Faustus Avienus	Probus
503	Volusianus	Dexicrates
504	Rufius Petronius Nicomachus Cethegus	sine collega
505	Theodorus	Sabinianus
506	Ennodius Messala	Areobindus Dagalaifus Areobindus
507	Venantius	Anastasius Augustus III
508	Decius Basilius Venantius	Celer
509	Inportunus	sine collega
510	Anicius Manlius Severinus Boethius	sine collega
511	Arcadius Placidus Magnus Felix	Secundinus
512	post consulatum Felicis	Paulus
		Moschianus
513	Probus	Taurus Clementinus Armonius Clementinus
514	Magnus Aurelius Cassiodorus Senator	sine collega
515	Florentius	Procopius Anthemius
516	Petrus	sine collega
517	Agapitus	Anastasius Paulus Probus Sabinianus Pompeius Anastasius
518	post consulatum Agapiti	Anastasius Paulus Probus Moschianus Probus Magnus
519	Eutharicus Cillica	Justinus Augustus
520	Rusticius	Vitalianus
521	Iobius Philippus Ymelcho Valerius	Petrus Sabbatius Justinianus
522	Boethius	Symmachus (western)
523	(Anicius) Maximus	sine collega
524	Venantius Opilio	Justinus Augustus II
525	Probus	Theodorus Filoxenus Sotericus Filoxenus
526	Olybrius	sine collega
527	Vettius Agorius Basilius Mavortius	sine collega
528	post consulatum Mavortii	Petrus Sabbatius Justinianus Augustus II
529	Decius	sine collega
530	Rufius Gennadius Probus Orestes	Lampadius (western)
531		post consulatum Lampadii et Orestis
532		II post consulatum Lampadii et Orestis
533	III post consulatum Lampadii et Orestis	Petrus Sabbatius Justinianus Augustus III
534	(Decius) Paulinus	Petrus Sabbatius Justinianus Augustus IV
535	post consulatum Paulini	Belisarius
536		post consulatum Belisarii
537		II post consulatum Belisarii
538	sine collega	Marianus Michaelius Gabrielius Archangelus Ioannes
539	post consulatum Ioannis	Strategius Apion Strategius Apion
540	sine collega	Mar. Petrus Theodorus Valentinus Rusticius Boraides Germanus Justinus
541	sine collega	Anicius Faustus Albinus Basilius

== Roman consuls of the East alone (541–887) ==
During the reign of Justinian I (527–565), the position of consul altered in two significant ways. From 535, there was no longer a Roman consul chosen in the West. In 541, the separate office of Roman consul was abolished. When used thereafter, the office was used as part of the imperial title. The office was finally abolished as part of the Basilika reforms of Leo VI the Wise in 887. The late antique practice of granting honorary consulships eventually evolved into the Byzantine court dignity of hypatos (the Greek translation of the Latin consul), which survived until the 12th century.

- 566: Justinus Augustus
- 568: Justinus Augustus II
- 579: Tiberius Constantinus Augustus
- 584: Mauricius Tiberius Augustus
- 602: Mauricius Tiberius Augustus II
- 603: Phocas Augustus
- 608: Heraclius & Heraclius
- 611: Heraclius Augustus II
- 632: Heraclius novus Constantinus Augustus
- 639: Heraclius Augustus
- 642: Constantinus Augustus
- 668: Constantinus Augustus
- 686: Justinianus Augustus (Note: According to Bede, Justinian II apparently adopted the title of consul for all the Julian years of his reign, consecutively numbered.)
- 699: Tiberius Augustus
- 711: Filepicus Augustus
- 714: Anastasius Augustus
- 716: Theodosius Augustus
- 718: Leo Augustus
- 742: Constantinus Augustus
- 742: Artavasdus Augustus
- 776: Leo Augustus
- 780: Constantinus Augustus
- 803: Nicephorus Augustus
- 812: Michael Augustus
- 814: Leo Augustus
- 821: Michael Augustus
- 830: Theophilus Augustus
- 843: Michael Augustus
- 867: Basilius Augustus
- 887: Leo Augustus

== Main bibliography ==
- Bagnall, Roger S.; Cameron, Alan; Schwartz, Seth R.; Worp, Klaas A. (1987). Consuls of the Later Roman Empire. Philological Monographs No. 36. American Philological Association. ISBN 1-55540-099-X.
- Broughton, Thomas R. S. (1951). The Magistrates of the Roman Republic: 509–31 BC. Philological Monograph No. 15. Vol. 1. APA.
- Broughton, Thomas R. S.; Patterson, Marcia L. (1952). The Magistrates of the Roman Republic: 509–31 BC. Philological Monograph No. 15. Vol. 2. APA. ISBN 0-89130-811-3.
- Syme, Ronald (1989). "The Consuls, 80 BC–AD 14". The Augustan Aristocracy. Clarendon Press. pp. 455–458ff. ISBN 978-0-19-814731-2.
- Cooley, Alison E. (2012). "Consular fasti, 298 BC – AD 541". The Cambridge Manual of Latin Epigraphy. CUP. ISBN 978-0-521-84026-2.
- Eck, Werner (2009). "Vespasian und die senatorische Führungsschicht des Reiches". In Luigi Capogrossi Colognesi & Elena Tassi Scandone (eds.). La Lex de imperio Vespasiani e la Roma dei Flavi. Rome: L'Erma di Bretschneider. pp. 231–257. ISBN 978-88-8265-526-6.
- Jones, A. H. M.; Martindale, J. R.; Morris, John, eds. (1971–1992). Prosopography of the Later Roman Empire. Cambridge University Press.
  - Appendix: Fasti Consulares (260-400), Vol. 1, pp. 1041–1045.
  - Appendix: Fasti Consulares (395-527), Vol. 2, pp. 1242–1245.
  - Appendix: Fasti Consulares (527-541), Vol. 3, p. 1457.

== Secondary bibliography ==
- Alföldy, Géza (1977). Konsulat und Senatorenstand unter den Antoninen (in German). Bonn: Habelt Verlag.
- Barnes, Timothy D. (1982). The New Empire of Diocletian and Constantine. doi:10.4159/harvard.9780674280670. ISBN 978-0-674-28067-0. S2CID 162343436.
- Beloch, Karl Julius (1926). Römische Geschichte bis zum Beginn der Punischen Kriege. Berlin: Walter de Gruyter. doi:10.1515/9783111473659. ISBN 978-3-11-110674-8.
- Bodel, John (1995). "Chronology and Succession 2: Notes on Some Consular Lists on Stone". Zeitschrift für Papyrologie und Epigraphik. 105: 279–296. JSTOR 20189285.
- Camodeca, Giuseppe (1986). "I consoli des 55–56 e un nuovo collega di seneca nel consolato: P. Cornelius Dolabella (TP.75 [=1401 +135)*". Zeitschrift für Papyrologie und Epigraphik (in Italian). 63: 201–215. JSTOR 20186375.
- Camodeca, Giuseppe (1991). "Novità sui fasti consolari delle tavolette cerate della Campania". Epigrafia: Actes du colloque international d'épigraphie latine en mémoire de Attilio Degrassi. Collection de l'École française de Rome. Vol. 143. Rome: École Française de Rome. pp. 45–74. ISBN 2-7283-0221-9.
- Camodeca, Giuseppe (2002). "I consoli del 43 e gli Antistii Veteres d'età claudia dalla riedizione delle Tabulae Herculanenses". Zeitschrift für Papyrologie und Epigraphik. 140: 227–236. JSTOR 20191503.
- Camodeca, Giuseppe (2015). "I consoli degli anni di Nerone nelle "Tabulae Herculanenses"". Zeitschrift für Papyrologie und Epigraphik. 193: 272–282. JSTOR 43909695.
- Cornell, T.J. (1995). The Beginnings of Rome: Italy and Rome from the Bronze Age to the Punic Wars (c. 1000–264 BC). London: Routledge. ISBN 0-415-01596-0.
- Drummond, Andrew (1978). "Some Observations on the Order of Consuls' Names". Athenaeum. 56. University of Pavia: 80–108. ISSN 0004-6574.
- Drummond, Andrew (1980). "Consular Tribunes in Livy and Diodorus". Athenaeum. 58. University of Pavia: 57–72. ISSN 0004-6574.
- Drummond, Andrew (1989). "Appendix". In F.W. Walbank; A.E. Astin; M.W. Frederiksen & R.M. Ogilvie (eds.). The Cambridge Ancient History. Vol. VII, part 2: The Rise of Rome to 220 B.C. (2nd ed.). Cambridge University Press. pp. 625–672. ISBN 0-521-23446-8.
- Degrassi, Attilio (1952). I fasti consolari dell'impero romano dal 30 avanti Cristo al 613 dopo Cristo (in Italian). Roma: Edizioni di Storia e Letteratura.
- Eck, Werner (1970). Senatoren von Vespasian bis Hadrian (in German). München: Beck.
- Eck, Werner (1975). "Ergänzungen zu den Fasti Consulares des 1. und 2. Jh.n.Chr" (PDF). Historia (in German). 24 (2): 324–344. JSTOR 4435445.
- Eck, Werner (2013). "Die Fasti consulares der Regierungszeit des Antoninus Pius. Eine Bestandsaufnahme seit Géza Alföldys Konsulat und Senatorenstand.". In Werner Eck; Bence Fehér & Péter Kovács (eds.). Studia Epigraphica in memoriam Géza Alföldy. Bonn: Dr. Rudolf Habelt. pp. 69–. ISBN 978-3-7749-3866-3.
- Eck, Werner & Andreas Pangerl (2013). "Neue Diplome mit den Namen von Konsuln und Statthaltern". Zeitschrift für Papyrologie und Epigraphik. 187: 273–294. JSTOR 23850781.
- Eck, Werner & Andreas Pangerl (2014). "Das vierte Diplom für die Provinz Galatia et Cappadocia, ausgestellt im Jahr 99". Zeitschrift für Papyrologie und Epigraphik. 192: 238–246. JSTOR 43909649.
- Frier, Bruce Woodward (1975). "Licinius Macer and the consules suffecti of 444 B. C.". Transactions of the American Philological Association. 105: 79–97. doi:10.2307/283935. JSTOR 283935.
- Gallivan, Paul A. (1974). "Some Comments on the Fasti for the Reign of Nero". The Classical Quarterly. 24 (2): 290–311. doi:10.1017/S0009838800032821. JSTOR 638490. S2CID 171006169.
- Gallivan, Paul A. (1978). "The Fasti for the Reign of Claudius". The Classical Quarterly. 28 (2): 407–426. doi:10.1017/S0009838800034959. S2CID 170721749.
- Gallivan, Paul A. (1979). "The Fasti for the Reign of Gaius". Antichthon. 13: 66–69. doi:10.1017/S0066477400002677. S2CID 148518682.
- Gallivan, Paul A. (1981). "The Fasti for A.D. 70–96". The Classical Quarterly. 31 (1): 186–220. doi:10.1017/S0009838800021194. S2CID 171027163.
- Ginsburg, Judith R. (1981). "Nero's Consular Policy". American Journal of Ancient History. 6 (1): 51–68. doi:10.31826/9781463237455-002. ISBN 978-1-4632-3745-5.
- Hammond, Mason (1957). "Imperial Elements in the Formula of the Roman Emperors during the First Two and a Half Centuries of the Empire". Memoirs of the American Academy in Rome. 25: 19–64. doi:10.2307/4238646. JSTOR 4238646.
- Leunissen, Paul (1989). Konsuln und Konsulare in der Zeit von Commodus bis Severus Alexander (in German). Amsterdam: Verlag Gieben.
- Mennen, Inge (2011). Power and Status in the Roman Empire, AD 193–284. BRILL. ISBN 978-90-04-20359-4.
- Ogilvie, R.M. (1965). A Commentary on Livy, Books 1–5. Oxford: Clarendon Press.
- Peck, Harry Thurston, ed. (1898). "Consules". Harper's Dictionary of Classical Literature and Antiquities.
- Phillips, Darryl A. (1997). "The Conspiracy of Egnatius Rufus and the Election of Suffect Consuls under Augustus". Historia. 46 (1): 103–112. JSTOR 4436453.
- Pina Polo, Francisco (2011). The Consul at Rome: The Civil Functions of the Consuls in the Roman Republic. Cambridge University Press. ISBN 978-1-139-49599-8.
- Ridley, R.T. (1980). "Fastenkritik: a Stocktaking". Athenaeum. 58. University of Pavia: 264–298. ISSN 0004-6574. ProQuest 1300412802.
- Smith, William, ed. (1859). "Consul". A Dictionary of Greek and Roman Antiquities (Second ed.). Boston: Little, Brown, and Company. pp. 352–356.
- Smith, William; Anthon, Charles, eds. (1886). "Fasti Consulares". A Dictionary of Greek and Roman Antiquities (Third American Carefully Revised ed.). New York: Harper & Brothers, Publishers. pp. 1075–1092.
- Salomies, Olli (2005). "Polyonymous Nomenclature in Consular Dating". Arctos: Acta Philologica Fennica. 39: 103–135. doi:10.71390/arctos.85895. ISSN 0570-734X.
- Salway, Benet (1994). "What's in a Name? A Survey of Roman Onomastic Practice from c. 700 B.C. to A.D. 700". Journal of Roman Studies. 84: 124–145. doi:10.2307/300873. JSTOR 300873. S2CID 162435434.
- Samuel, Alan E. (1972). Greek and Roman Chronology. München: C.H. Beck.
- Sandys, John (1927). Latin Epigraphy: an Introduction to the Study of Latin Inscriptions. Chicago: University of Chicago Press.
- Tansey, Patrick (2018). "Notabilia varia in the fasti of Alba Fucens". Studi Classici e Orientali. 64: 199–270. ISSN 0081-6124. JSTOR 26495463.
- Taylor, Lily Ross & Broughton, T. Robert S. (1949). "The Order of the Two Consuls' Names in the Yearly Lists". Memoirs of the American Academy in Rome. 19: 3–14. doi:10.2307/4238618. JSTOR 4238618.
- Taylor, Lily Ross (1951). "New Indications of Augustan Editing in the Capitoline Fasti". Classical Philology. 46 (2): 73–80. doi:10.1086/363374. JSTOR 265964. S2CID 162251023.
- Taylor, Lily Ross & Broughton, T. Robert S. (1968). "The Order of the Consuls' Names in Official Republican Lists". Historia. 17 (2): 166–172. JSTOR 4435023.
- Tortoriello, Annalisa (2004). I fasti consolari degli anni di Claudio (in Italian). Roma: Accademia Nazionale dei Lincei.
- Vidman, Ladislav (1982) [1957]. Fasti Ostienses (in Latin) (2nd ed.). Prague: Academia.

== Primary sources ==
- List of Roman consuls (483 BC to AD 13) of the Fasti Capitolini
- List of Roman consuls (509 BC to AD 354) in the Chronograph of 354
- List of Roman consuls (509 BC to AD 468) in the Fasti of Hydatius
- List of Roman consuls (509 BC to AD 519) in the Chronicle of Cassiodorus, after Victorius and Prosper.
- List of Roman consuls (AD 222 to AD 630) in the Fasti Heracliani of Stephanus of Alexandria.
