= Domitius Zenofilus =

Roman statesman and aristocrat

Domitius Zenofilus (or Zenophilus; fl. 320–333 AD) was a Roman senator who had an illustrious political career under the Emperor Constantine. He governed many provinces and held the consulate in 333.

== Life and career ==
Zenofilus held the rank of vir clarissimus, and thus was probably born into an aristocratic and senatorial family, but the commonness of his hereditary nomen, "Domitius", makes it difficult to ascertain his lineage. Chastagnol posited a Sicilian or eastern origin based on his Greek surname. A Numidian inscription (AE 1915, 30) recording a dedication by him to Aesculapius and Hygia indicates that he was probably a pagan.

He is first known to have been governor (corrector) of Sicily, and then of an unknown other province. Later, on 13 December 320, he is attested as consular governor of Numidia (consularis Numidiae) in north Africa, when he presided over the condemnation of Silvanus, the Donatist bishop of Cirta, as a traditor. Zenophilus then appears to have served as proconsular governor of Achaia, no later than 323–324, and in this capacity may have been involved in the Emperor Constantine's preparations of war against his rival Licinius. He was afterward proconsul of Asia, probably from 325 to 327, and finally proconsul of Africa, from 328 to 332. Constantine appointed Zenofilus as one of the two consuls for 333, with Delmatius, the Emperor's half-brother, as his colleague. Novak concluded that Zenofilus's career demonstrates "he was clearly one of the Constantinian government's most ubiquitous servants and supporters".

An inscription on a seat in the Colosseum, from the time of Odoacer, names one (...)enofilus, clarissimus vir. If the correct name is Zenofilus, then the individual could have been a descendant of the consul, though Martindale also notes the restoration 'Menofilus' is possible.

== Footnotes ==
Political offices
Preceded by Lucius Papius Pacatianus; Mecilius Hilarianus	Roman consul 333; With: Flavius Delmatius	Succeeded by Flavius Optatus; Amnius Anicius Paulinus
