= Lucius Aemilius Mamercinus (consular tribune 391 BC) =

Early 4th century BC Roman politician and soldier

Lucius Aemilius Mamercinus was a Roman politician and general who, in the early 4th century BC, held the office of consular tribune an extraordinary six times in his distinguished, yet mostly unknown, career.

== Family ==
He was a member of the family of the Aemilii Mamercini, a branch of the patrician Aemilia gens which had achieved its first consulship in 484 BC and regularly attained consular honors since then. Lucius Aemilius was the son of Mamercus Aemilius Mamercinus, who served as dictator three times and consular tribune once in the 430s and 420s BC, and the younger brother of Manius Aemilius Mamercinus, who was consul once and consular tribune thrice in the decade of the 400s BC. this gave him a very distinguished pedigree, which was likely helpful in his career in politics. Aemilius had one recorded son, also named Lucius Aemilius Mamercinus, who himself served as consul in 366 and 363 BC, and possibly as Magister equitum in 352 BC.

== Career ==
In 391 BC, Aemilius was elected consular tribune for the first time, serving alongside Lucius Lucretius Tricipitinus Flavus, Servius Sulpicius Camerinus, Lucius Furius Medullinus, and Gaius Aemilius Mamercinus, a distant cousin. In this year two wars were conducted, one against Volsinii and the other against the Salpinates. Aemilius is not mentioned taking part in either campaign, however, likely inferring that he, alongside Servius Sulpicius who was also not mentioned as being on campaign, were charged with administering the city of Rome. In Livy, Lucius Aemilius is instead referred to as Marcus, meaning that it is a possibility that this Aemilius was not the same as the consular tribune of the year.

In 389 BC, Aemilius was again elected consular tribune, this time alongside Lucius Valerius Poplicola, Lucius Verginius Tricostus Esquilinus, Publius Cornelius, Aulus Manlius Capitolinus, and Lucius Postumius Albinus Regillensis. In the previous year, Rome was sacked by a horde of marauding Gauls, and while the Gauls were soon after defeated under the auspices of the dictator Marcus Furius Camillus, Rome was heavily weakened by the sack, giving her enemies an opportunity to strike, among them being the Volscians and Etruscans. To defend against these threats, the senate appointed Camillus as dictator once again, after which he recruited as many young men as he could and marched off to war. Camillus however, did delegate his authority to the tribunes, giving a detachment of men to Aulus Manlius so that he could hold down the city, and another detachment to Aemilius to defend against the Etruscan threat, while he himself marched to fight the Volscians.

In 387 BC, Aemilius was elected consular tribune yet again, alongside Lucius Papirius Cursor, Gnaeus Sergius Fidenas Coxo, Licinus Menenius Lanatus, Lucius Valerius Poplicola, and possibly Aulus Manlius Capitolinus. This year was a quiet one, as no military campaign was undertaken, however, there were a few notable actions within the city, with a temple to Mars being dedicated and four new voting tribes being established.

In 383 BC, Aemilius was chosen as consular tribune for a fourth time, serving with his former colleagues Aulus Manlius Capitolinus, Lucius Lucretius Tricipitinus Flavus, and Lucius Valerius Poplicola, as well as Servius Sulpicius Rufus and Marcus Trebonius. During this year war was declared on Velitrae and Lanuvium but was not conducted, as a result of a pestilence at Rome. The year also saw the beginning of a conflict with the Latin city of Praeneste that continued for the next several years.

The next year, in 382 BC, Aemilius was once again consular tribune, with Spurius Papirius Crassus, Lucius Papirius Mugillanus, Servius Cornelius Maluginensis, Quintus Servilius Fidenas, and Gaius Sulpicius Camerinus. In this year, the tribunes Spurius and Lucius Papirius carried on the war against Velitrae, defeating their armies in battle, while the rest of the tribunes, including Aemilius, presided over the city.

In 380 BC, Aemilius was honored with his sixth and final term as consular tribune. In this term, he served with Lucius Valerius Poplicola, Publius Valerius Potitus Poplicola, Servius Cornelius Maluginensis, Licinus Menenius Lanatus, Gaius Sulpicius Peticus, Gnaeus Sergius Fidenas Coxo, Tiberius Papirius Crassus, and Lucius Papirius Mugillanus. In this year, there was a civil disturbance between the patricians and plebeians, which caused the Praenestines, whom the Romans were still at war with, to attack the city, resulting in the naming of a dictator to defeat them.

== Bibliography ==
- Livy (Titus Livius), Ab Urbe Condita Libri
