= Mecilius Hilarianus =

Roman politician

Mecilius Hilarianus was a Roman politician and senator in the fourth century AD.

== Career ==
In 316 AD, Hilarianus served as Corrector (Governor) of the province of Lucania et Bruttii in Southern Italia. In 324 AD, he became Proconsul of Africa and received the title of vir clarissimus.

In 332 AD, Hilarianus was appointed consul together with Lucius Papius Pacatianus as his colleague. In 337 AD, after the death of Emperor Constantine I, he supported Constans I in his conflicts against his brothers. In 338-339 AD, Hilarianus served as Urban Prefect of Rome.

After the death of Constans in 350 AD, he fled to the court of Constantius II, returning to Rome after the latter's victory over Magnentius. Then or in 354 AD, he was appointed Praetorian Prefect of Italy.
