= Marcus Junius Pennus (consul) =

Roman consul 167 BC

Marcus Junius Pennus was a Roman politician in the second century BC.

== Family ==
He was a member of the gens Junia. His father of the same name served as aedile in 205 BC. His son, also named Marcus Junius Pennus, was tribune of the plebs in 126 BC.

== Career ==
In 172 BC, Pennus served as praetor, administering the province of Hispania Citerior. In 167 BC, he was elected consul together with Quintus Aelius Paetus as his colleague. Whilst Paetus led a war against the Ligurians, Pennus consulted the Senate about sending ambassadors to Rhodes.
