= Pacatian (Roman governor) =

Vicarius of Roman Britain in 319

Lucius Papius Pacatianus or Pacatian was a vicarius of Roman Britain in 319. His holding the post is recorded in the Codex Theodosianus, although little else is known of him. He presided over a period of economic instability with coin hoards indicating high inflation, although several high status villas were rebuilt around this time and with Christian mosaics being built into them.
