= Aulus Manlius Capitolinus =

4th-century BC Roman consul

Aulus Manlius Capitolinus was a politician of the Roman Republic and the brother of Marcus Manlius Capitolinus. In 389, 385, 383, and 370 BC, he was a Military Tribune with Consular power. During his 389 tribuneship, he served under the dictator, Marcus Furius Camillus, guarding Rome during the Battle ad Maecium. His following tribuneship in 385 was spent fighting the Volsci, who were aided by the Hernici and other Latins. In his third tribuneship in 383, he fought again with the Volsci, who were joined by Lanuvium and other rebellious cities in Latium. During his 370 BC tribuneship, Manlius and his fellow consular tribunes drove the colonists of Velitrae out of Tusculum and later laid siege to Velitrae.
