= Roman–Dalmatian wars =

Conflicts from 156 BC - AD 9

The Roman–Dalmatian wars were a series of conflicts between the Dalmatae (Delmatae) and the Romans. After the fall of the Ardiaei in southern Illyria, the Dalmatae were to pose the greatest resistance against the Romans in their conquest of Illyria.

The first confrontation in 156 BC – 155 BC finished with the destruction of the Dalmatian capital Delminium by the consul Scipio Nasica. The second war was fought in 118 BC, after the fall of the kingdom of Gentius in the south, apparently ending in a Roman victory as the consul L. Caecilius Metellus celebrated a triumph in 117 BC and assumed his surname "Delmaticus". The third conflict occurred between 78 BC – 76 BC and finished with the capture of the Dalmatian stronghold, Salona (port Solin near modern city Split) by the proconsul C. Cosconius.

During the Roman Civil war of 49 BC – 44 BC, the Dalmatae sided with Pompey and continuously fought against and gained victories over the Caesarian generals Gabinius, Bibulus and Vatinius. The fourth and final conflict occurred during Octavian's expedition to Illyricum in 34 BC because of their iterative revolts. The two Dalmatian commanders, Verzo and Testimus, surrendered and Octavian's campaign finished with the capture of the new Dalmatian capital Setovia (now Klis). The last revolts of the Dalmatae, under their federal leader Bato, against the Romans were in AD 6–9 during the Great Illyrian Revolt, which failed and resulted in the final pacification of bellicose Dalmatae.

== Prelude ==
=== Dalmatian federation ===
The Dalmatae had once been subject to Pleuratus III but had broken away on the accession of Gentius in 181 BC, when they proceeded to attack neighbouring peoples, forcing them to pay tribute in cattle and crops. In 158 BC, the Greek city of Issa complained to her Roman ally that the Dalmatae were molesting their mainland settlements of Tragurium and Epetium; similar complaints were received from the Illyrian Daorsi, neighbours of the Dalmatae on the south.

=== Roman response ===
A Roman ex-consul, Gaius Fannius Strabo, was sent to investigate and report on affairs in Illyria and in particular on the activities of the Dalmatae. The embassy reported that the latter had not only refused them a hearing but made no provision for their accommodation and even stole the horses they had borrowed for the journey. In fear of their safety, they had departed as discreetly as possible. The Senate was indignant, but Polybius reports that the decision to send an expedition across the Adriatic was a matter of considered policy. Illyria had been neglected since the defeat of Demetrius of Pharos in 219 BC and it was high time the Illyrians were reminded of Roman authority. Moreover, the Senate felt that as 12 years of peace had elapsed since the war against Perseus of Macedon, it was time to rekindle the military ardour of the Romans. These were the true causes of the war, but for public consumption it was the insult to the Roman ambassadors. This was not to be the only occasion a Roman army was sent across the Adriatic for battle practices, although other versions suggest that this may not be the whole story.

== Expeditions ==
=== Siege of Delminium (156/5 BC) ===
The expedition of 156 BC, which was led by the consul Gaius Marcius Figulus, landed in Narona. Figulus was caught off guard while pitching camp and driven back to the river Narenta, having perhaps advanced from the territory of the Daorsi. Next, the Romans marched via the Trebizat valley to Delminium, where the main Dalmatian army was stationed. The capital was well fortified and protected and thus the Romans failed to catch the Illyrians unawares and could only set up a blockade before winter set in, though some lesser strongholds were taken. In 155 BC, the consul Publius Cornelius Scipio Nasica Corculum forced a surrender after fierce confrontations. The fortifications were destroyed, the place was turned into a sheep-pasture and Corculum returned home to celebrate his triumph over the Dalmatae.

=== Triumph of L. Caecilius Metellus (118 BC) ===
Nearly forty years passed before the next Roman attack on the Dematae, but the motives according to Appian, were no less dubious. In 118 BC, the consul of the previous year, Lucius Caecilius Metellus Delmaticus, led an expedition against the Dalmatae for which he was awarded the title "Delmaticus". War was declared not because the Dalmatae had done anything wrong but merely in order to procure another triumph for the Metelli family. In the event, the Illyrians received him as a friend and he wintered among them in the town of Salona, following which he returned to Rome and was awarded a triumph.

=== Capture of Salona (78-76 BC) ===
The next campaign was altogether a more serious business, although little is known of it except that the proconsul Gaius Cosconius overcame most of the Dalmatae in a two-year campaign between 78 and 76 BC, which concluded with the capture of Salona.

=== Dalmatian offensive (50-42 BC) ===
From 58 to 50 BC, the Dalmatae were in the charge of Julius Caesar, proconsul of Gaul and Illyricum, though the commander was able to give little attention to his Adriatic responsibilities. During the subsequent civil war between Caesar and Pompey, the Dalmatae supported the latter, in opposition to the communities of Roman settlers at Salona, Narona and elsewhere, who remained loyal to the party of Caesar. In 50 BC, the Dalmatian army attacked the Liburnians for the possession of the city of Promona. The Liburnians, who were unable to resist the force of the Dalmatae, called on Caesar for help. The Romans immediately sent an army, which was crushed by the Dalmatae. Late in 48 BC, the Dalmatae ambushed a Caesarian army of 15 infantry cohorts and 3,000 cavalry under the ex-consul A. Gabinius at Synodion, probably somewhere in the Cikola valley. Five cohorts were overwhelmed and their standards captured. The Roman army was nearly annihilated but Gabinius reached Salona. However, he was so short of supplies that he had to plunder them from the Dalmatae, leading to further losses. Gabinius soon died in Salona. Roman proconsuls continued to engage the Dalmatae after Caesar's victory over Pompey. In 45-44 BC, P. Vatinius wrote from Narona more than once to Cicero pleading for help to secure his triumphs. He complained that there were not merely 20 oppida (Dalmatian settlements) as was generally believed but nearer 60. On 31 July 42 BC, Vatinius finally obtained his triumph over some fortifications but not over the whole federation. In 44 BC, the senator Balbius attacked the federation with five cohorts. The Dalmatae were victorious and Balbius himself was killed in action. The Dalmatae went on the offensive and retook Salona.

=== Surrender of Testimus (33 BC) ===
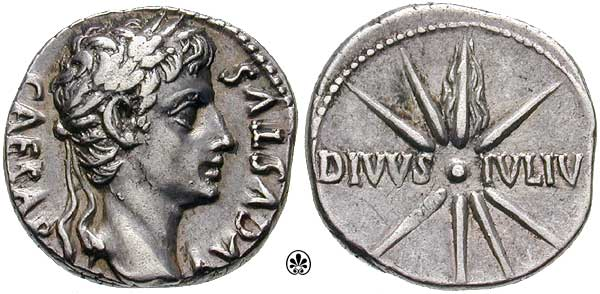
Octavian's campaigns led to the surrender of Verzo and Testimus

After eliminating the destructive power of Sextus Pompeius in Sicily in 36 BC, Octavian devoted the following years to operations in Illyria, first in 35 BC against the Japodes and Pannonians, then, in 34–33 BC, against the Dalmatae. Not only had they remained in arms after the departure of Vatinius ten years before, but the Illyrians still held the five Roman standards seized from Gabinius' army in 48 BC. Octavian's army first moved against Promona, where the Dalmatian leader Verzo had stationed most of his army of 12,000 men in order to ambush the Roman army on the march. Reaching Promona, Octavian first took the surrounding hills and then proceeded to attack the city. Testimus, the other Dalmatian commander, was cut off by the Romans on his route to aid Verzo. After some fighting, Promona was taken, Verzo killed and the Dalmatae ordered to disperse by his successor Testimus, while the Romans attacked his strongholds. Tetsimus's guerrilla warfare tactics did not deter Octavian from capturing Synodium and Andetrium. Afterwards, the army advanced up the Cikola valley. Testimus poured all his troops in the city of Setovia. In the Battle of Setovia (probably the Sutina gorge), Octavian was wounded and left the scene, handing over command to Statilius Taurus, who organised a winter blockade that brought some of the Dalmatae to capitulate. Early in 33 BC, Octavian returned to receive the surrender, along with the standards of Gabinius, some booty, 700 young males and a promise to pay the arrears of tribute unpaid since Caesar's time. Though other Illyrian peoples were involved in the surrender, it was the victory over the Dalmatae that justified one of the three triumphs celebrated by Octavian, on 13 August 29 BC. In 12 BC, the Dalmatae revolted, capturing Salona; but this was soon retaken by the Romans.

=== Great Illyrian Revolt (AD 6-9) ===
The Dalmatae joined the Illyrian alliance in AD 6 in one last revolt against the Romans. The rising began among the Daesitiates of central Bosnia under their leader Bato I but were soon joined by the Breuci and numerous other Illyrians. The four-year war, which lasted from AD 6 to 9, saw huge concentrations of Roman forces in the area, (on one occasion 10 legions and their auxiliaries in a single camp), with whole armies operating across the western Balkans and fighting on more than one front. On 3 August AD 8, the Breuci of the Sava valley surrendered, but it took another winter blockade and a season of fighting before the surrender of the Daesiates came in AD 9. It took the Romans three years of hard fighting to quell the revolt, which was described by the Roman historian Suetonius as the most difficult conflict faced by Rome since the Punic Wars two centuries earlier.

By AD 9, the name of the Dalmatae had begun to be applied to area between the Adriatic and the Sava valley, as the Roman province Dalmatia was established.

== See also ==
- Illyrian warfare
