= Marcus Cornelius Cethegus (consul 160 BC) =

Roman Republic consul

Marcus Cornelius Cethegus was a Roman statesman in the first half of the 2nd century BC. He was elected consul in 160 BC, in which position he served alongside Lucius Anicius Gallus. He drained the Pomptine Marshes and converted them into arable land.

In 171 BC he was sent as part of a commission into Cisalpine Gaul to determine why the consul Gaius Cassius Longinus had left his province. In 169 BC he was triumvir coloniae deducendae, an official charged with establishing a colony in Aquileia.

== See also ==
- Cornelia gens

Political offices
Preceded by Marcus Valerius Messalla, and Gaius Fannius Strabo	Consul of the Roman Republic; 160 BC with Lucius Anicius Gallus	Succeeded by Gnaeus Cornelius Dolabella, and Marcus Fulvius Nobilior
