= Publius Cornelius Scipio Nasica Corculum =

Roman consul in 155 BC, pontifex maximus and princeps senatus

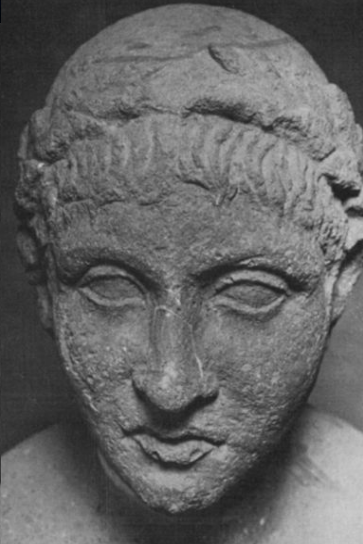
- The so-called "Head of Ennius", found in the Tomb of the Scipiones, identified by Filippo Coarelli as that of Scipio Nasica Corculum, now in the Museo Pio Clementino, Vatican.
- Born: c. 206 BC
- Died: c. 141 BC
- Office: Consul (162, 155 BC); Censor (159 BC); Pontifex maximus Princeps senatus
- Children: Publius Cornelius Scipio Nasica Serapio
- Military career
- Rank: Military tribune, consul
- Wars: Third Macedonian War • Battle of Pydna; First Dalmatian War
- Awards: Roman triumph

Publius Cornelius Scipio Nasica Corculum (Note: The majority of academic sources shorten his name into "Nasica", but this article uses "Corculum" instead in order to distinguish him from the six other Scipiones called Nasica, even though he probably received this nickname in his later life.) (c. 206 BC – c. 141 BC) was a politician of the Roman Republic. Born into the illustrious family of the Cornelii Scipiones, he was one of the most important Roman statesmen of the second century BC, being consul two times in 162 and 155 BC, censor in 159 BC, pontifex maximus (chief priest) in 150 BC, and finally princeps senatus (leader of the Senate) in 147 BC.

Corculum was a talented military commander, who played a decisive role during the Battle of Pydna in 168 BC; he later won a triumph over the Dalmatae in 155 BC. He was remembered as a staunch conservative, defender of the ancestral Roman customs against political and cultural innovations, notably Hellenism, in contradiction with the policies of his famous father-in-law Scipio Africanus and cousin Scipio Aemilianus. This conservatism led him to order the destruction of the first stone theatre in Rome in 151 BC and to oppose the final war against Carthage, advocated by his rival Cato the Censor. In spite of his political influence, Corculum could not prevent the war from being voted in 149 BC, with the probable support of his cousin Scipio Aemilianus, who destroyed Carthage in 146 BC.

Due to a lack of sources, his life is sparsely known. Moreover, ancient authors often give contradictory accounts of his life; as a result, modern historians have had diverging interpretations to explain some of his deeds, especially his opposition to the war against Carthage, or his destruction of the first Roman theatre in stone.

== Family background ==
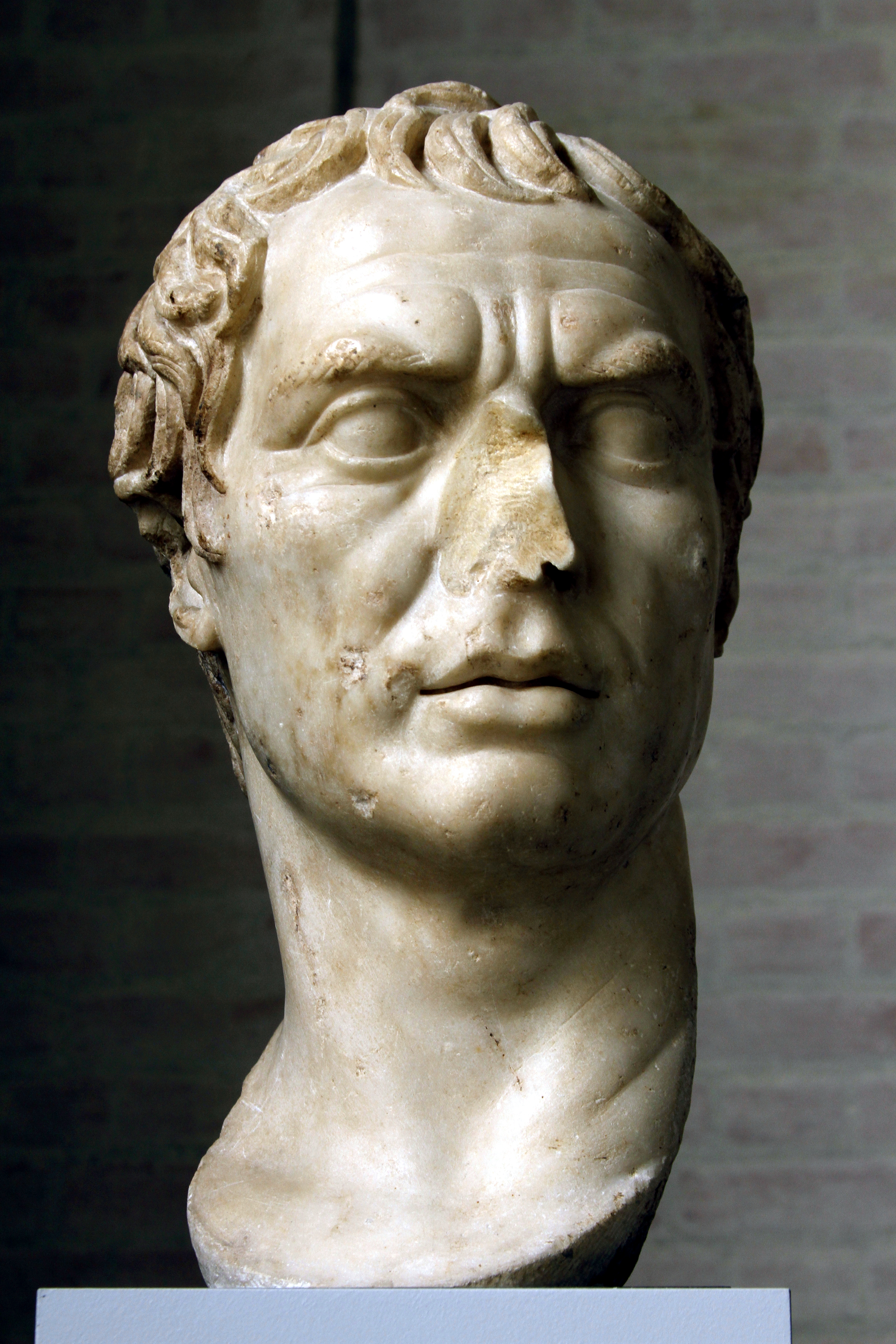
2nd century BC marble bust, thought to be of Scipio Africanus—Corculum's cousin and father-in-law—now in the Ny Carlsberg Glyptotek. It has been traditionally attributed to Sulla.

Corculum belonged to the patrician gens Cornelia, which was the foremost gens of the Republic in terms of consulships (the Cornelii had obtained 42 consulships before his). The Scipiones formed one of the two main stirpes of the Cornelii—the other being the Lentulii—with 14 consulships since Publius Cornelius Maluginensis Scipio, consul in 395 and founder of the family. Corculum was the son of Publius Cornelius Scipio Nasica (consul in 191) and grandson of Gnaeus Cornelius Scipio Calvus (consul in 222) who died during the Second Punic War. In addition, he was the cousin of Scipio Africanus, who defeated Hannibal, and Lucius Cornelius Scipio Asiaticus, who defeated Antiochos III. He also had a younger brother named Lucius, whose career is unknown, possibly because he was demoted by Cato the Censor during his censorship of 184.

Corculum married his second cousin Cornelia, eldest daughter of Scipio Africanus. They were betrothed in Africanus' lifetime, but married after his death in 183; on this occasion Corculum received a large dowry of 25 silver talents. The marriage may have been concluded between Scipio Nasica and Africanus' daughter to improve relations among the family, which had been strained by political competition between its members; for instance, Nasica had run against Scipio Asiaticus for the consulship in 191 and for the censorship in 184.

The Scipiones used a number of personal nicknames to distinguish themselves from other prominent men of the family. Corculum's father used the agnomen Nasica ("nosed"), which was retained by his descendants—including Corculum—as a second cognomen. The agnomen Corculum is unique in Roman history; it is probably an archaic Latin word meaning "intellectual giftedness" or "cleverness". It is not known how Corculum received this nickname, but it may derive from his ingenious military strategies.

Cicero speaks highly of Corculum, describing him as "an able orator", but it seems that his speeches were already lost by Cicero's time. He and Aurelius Victor add that Corculum was a respected jurist, specialising in civil and pontifical law. Some scholars thought that he was even given a house on the Via Sacra by the state, in order to be consulted by the people more easily, but this honour was given to his father.

The Scipiones Nasicae claimed a moral superiority over Rome with the epithet of optimus vir (the "best man"), carried at least since Lucius Scipio (consul in 259) as he is described as such on his epitaph. It seems that his descendants were able to convince their peers of this claim, because Corculum's father (the consul of 191) officially received the title of Optimus Vir from the senate when in 204 he was asked to bring the sacred stone of the goddess Magna Mater from Ostia to Rome. Corculum is likewise designated by Livy as the "best man" in the Periochae. The Nasicae likely used the prestige of this epithet for their own benefit, but contrary to Africanus, Asiaticus, and Aemilianus, they followed a very conservative line and scrupulously respected the senatorial supremacy, while their cousins often breached constitutional rules with the support of popular assemblies.

== Political career ==
=== Aedile (169 BC) ===
Corculum's first known magistracy is that of curule aedile in 169. Together with his colleague Publius Cornelius Lentulus (the future consul of 162), they funded the most lavish circus games ever seen so far, which included 63 panthers, 40 bears and elephants. Livy does not tell the nature of the show; it could have been staged hunts (venatio), or a simple parade of animals. The aediles benefited from a law passed the previous year by the tribune of the plebs Gnaeus Aufidius, which allowed importation of beasts from Africa for the circus games. The ban on such imports might have been justified by the fear that they could enrich Carthage, from where they were bought—a policy perhaps sponsored by Cato.

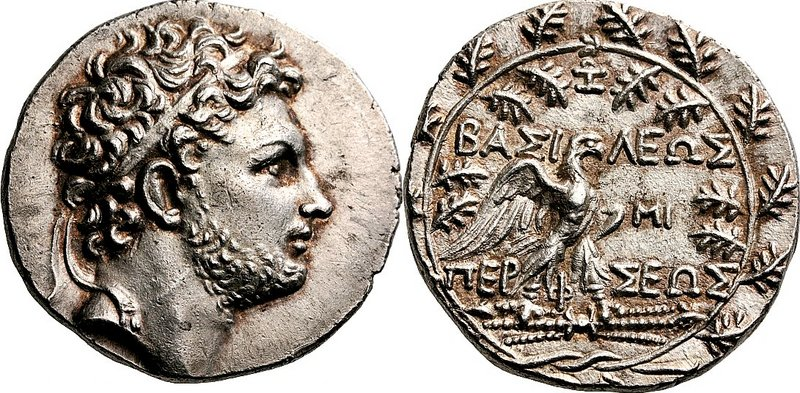
Tetradrachm of Perseus, minted between 179 and 172 BC at Pella or Amphipolis. The reverse depicts Zeus' eagle on a thunderbolt.

=== Role at Pydna (168 BC) ===
Map of the operations before the battle; Corculum turning movement around Mt. Olympus forced Perseus to retreat from his strong position on the Elpeus River to Pydna.

The Third Macedonian War began in 171 after King Perseus of Macedon had allegedly tried to assassinate Rome's ally Eumenes II of Pergamon (among many other reasons). However, Perseus managed to defend his kingdom rather well for a couple of years. In 168 Rome mustered a strong army under the consul Lucius Aemilius Paullus to put an end to the conflict. Paullus chose Corculum to serve as one of his military tribunes, probably for family reasons, as Paullus was also the brother-in-law of Scipio Africanus, and the Aemilii were long allies of the Cornelii. Despite their family connections, ancient historians' accounts show that they had difficult relations throughout the campaign.

Most of what is known on the final military operations of the Third Macedonian War derive from two lost—and conflicting—sources, quoted by later classical writers. The first one is the Histories of Polybius, who talked to several witnesses of the war (Romans and Macedonians); his story was mostly followed by Livy. The second account is a letter or memoir written by Corculum himself and addressed to a king, possibly Massinissa of Numidia, as the Cornelii had personal ties with him since Scipio Africanus. This memoir was used by Plutarch in his Life of Aemilius, who notes the discrepancies with Polybius. The memoir is considered to be one of the earliest Roman autobiographical texts, second to a long letter of Scipio Africanus to Philip V, which likely inspired Corculum. Opinions on the memoir have widely diverged among modern historians; some consider it to be a faithful account of the events, while others have rejected it as an act of self-advertising, with further opinions in-between.

In southern Macedonia Perseus had fortified the north bank of the Elpeus River to prevent Paullus from entering his kingdom from the south. Paullus therefore designed a circling movement around Mount Olympus to flank Perseus. He appointed Corculum to head this operation, assisted by Quintus Fabius Maximus Aemilianus (Paullus' natural son, adopted into the Fabii); Corculum said he and Fabius volunteered. According to Polybius, Corculum took 5,000 men with him (Corculum said 8,320 men in his memoir). At first, he faked a movement to the sea, but once at Heracleum he told his staff the real purpose of the mission, and moved by night to Pythium (departing in the night of 17 and 18 June 168). Meanwhile, Paullus attacked the Macedonians to prevent them from detecting Corculum's move. Pythium was successfully taken in the early morning of 20 June 168, perhaps because the garrison was still asleep. Corculum's version is different, as he wrote that a deserter warned Perseus of the flanking manoeuvre; he therefore had to face a force of 12,000 men, whom he defeated—and also personally killed a giant Thracian. Livy, following Polybius, tells the Macedonians were only 5,000, a number favoured by modern historians. In any case, after hearing of the capture of Pythium, Perseus retreated north, and set his camp just before Pydna. Corculum then completed the turning movement around Mount Olympus and met with Paullus (who had followed Perseus) on 21 June. Livy says that Corculum and other officers in Paullus' staff wanted to attack Perseus immediately, but the consul preferred to delay in order to rest the troops.

The Battle of Pydna started on 22 June, after an unexpected skirmish between foraging soldiers. The phalanx advanced against the legions, but the uneven field broke its ranks, so Roman soldiers could pass through the gaps thus created and defeat smaller bits of phalanx individually, resulting in a crushing victory for the Romans, who only lost 80 men (according to Corculum). Corculum said he led the Roman right wing, which had to fight Perseus' Thracian contingent, but it might be another rewriting of the events from him. Paullus then sent him to Amphipolis in order to ravage the area and prevent Perseus from counter-attacking, since he had been seen heading to this city after his defeat. Once there, Corculum likely informed Paullus that Perseus had fled to Samothrace, where he was finally captured by Gnaeus Octavius, who commanded the fleet. According to Plutarch, Perseus initially wanted to surrender to Corculum because he trusted him more. It illustrates the very high status enjoyed by the Scipiones among Mediterranean courts, almost that of a royal family.

It seems that Corculum prevented Amphipolis from being punished by Paullus for having opened its gates to Perseus in his flight, because a statue of him was later erected in the city's gymnasium. Corculum's moderation against the defeated Macedonians and Greeks mimicked that of Africanus after his victories against Carthage and the Seleucids, and contrasted with the brutality of Aemilius Paullus, who enslaved 150.000 people in Epirus on his way back to Rome. It was "the greatest slave-hunting operation in the history of Rome". Plutarch's criticism of Paullus on this point might derive from an hostile comment by Corculum in his memoir, who could have disapproved Paullus' enslavement of the Epirotes.

Corculum remained tribune of the soldiers in 167, and was sent by Paullus to raid Illyria in retaliation for having supported Perseus.

=== First Consulship (162 BC) ===
Corculum was praetor in 165, although nothing is known on his magistracy because Livy's manuscript ends the previous year. He then became consul in 162, alongside the plebeian Gaius Marcius Figulus. Cassiodorus—who relied on Livy for his list of consuls—describes him as the consul prior, which means the centuriate assembly elected him before Figulus. Corculum was assigned the province of Corsica, while Figulus departed to Gaul. However, Tiberius Sempronius Gracchus—the previous consul who had presided over their election—realised after their departure that he had not conducted the auspices correctly; the senate therefore decided to recall the consuls and organise new consular elections. The new consuls were Lentulus—Corculum's former colleague in 169 and 165—and Gnaeus Domitius Ahenobarbus.

Modern scholars do not believe the "official" explanation of Corculum's removal found in ancient sources, and see instead an intrigue against him, even though Gracchus was Corculum's brother-in-law (he had married another daughter of Scipio Africanus). Scullard postulates that Gracchus had some interests in Corsica and Sardinia, and wanted to keep Corculum out of his clientele. Briscoe thinks that there were some unknown disagreement among the Cornelii Scipiones, and that Corculum clashed with the rest of the family; Gracchus was at this time very close to the Scipiones Africani and might have acted against his brother-in-law. It would explain several later cases of tensions between the Nasicae and the Africani.

=== Censorship (159–158 BC) ===
In 159 Corculum was elected censor prior with the plebeian Marcus Popillius Laenas, despite his abortive consulship. The censors completed the 54th lustrum, and registered 328,316 Roman citizens, almost 9,000 less than the previous lustrum of 164. They re-appointed for the fifth time Marcus Aemilius Lepidus as princeps senatus. Aulus Gellius reports an anecdote from Masurius Sabinus on the demotion of a knight by the censors during the census, because his horse was not well-fed, and its owner answered the censors disrespectfully, an event similar to what happened to Corculum's younger brother in 184.

As for his building program, Corculum installed the first water clock at Rome in the Basilica Aemilia; the Romans had to hitherto rely solely on sundials. He also removed all the statues of men placed around the Forum that had been built without an instruction from the Senate or a people's assembly. The bronze statue of Spurius Cassius Vecellinus, who had been sentenced to death for seeking regal power in 485 BC, was even melted down. The censors' goal was to temper individual ambitions as they could threaten the collective government of the Roman Republic. This decision was taken in a context of increased control on public morality, notably marked by the Lex Fannia of 161, a sumptuary law which restricted ostentatious banquets. Velleius Paterculus adds that Corculum built porticoes on the Capitol around the Temple of Jupiter. They were located besides the arch built by Scipio Africanus, and therefore gave the Scipiones a strong presence on the Capitol. Davies however thinks that such porticoes typically followed a successful campaign and should be dated after Corculum's triumph in 155–154.

=== Second Consulship (155 BC) ===
Corculum was elected consul a second time in 155, together with the plebeian Marcus Claudius Marcellus—former consul in 166, and the grandson of the great Claudius Marcellus. Corculum was once again described as consul prior by Cassiodorus. His election broke the ten-year-rule fixed by the Lex Villia, which forbade iterations of a magistracy within ten years. Since Corculum's short-lived colleague in 162 Marcius Figulus was also elected consul in 156, both former consuls must have argued that they were not really concerned by the Lex Villia as their consulship had been cancelled.

Territory controlled by the Dalmatae (yellow) in the first half of the 2nd century BC.

The Senate sent Marcellus against the Ligures and Corculum against the Dalmatae in Illyria. The First Dalmatian War had been triggered in 156 by an attack of the Dalmatae on the Illyrians, allied to Rome, and their treatment of an embassy of Gaius Fannius Strabo (consul in 161). In addition, Polybius gave the contemptuous explanation that the senate wanted to give some exercise to the army, possibly because he was opposed to this war. Figulus—the consul for 156—was initially defeated by the Dalmatae, but then besieged their capital of Delminium (now near Tomislavgrad in Bosnia, but different from the Roman Delminium). Corculum took over the command at this point and captured Delmnium, which he completely destroyed and sold its inhabitants to slavery. However, Appian and Florus do not mention Corculum at all, and ascribe the whole campaign to Figulus, while Frontinus and Zonaras make Corculum the only Roman commander of the war. As Corculum was awarded a triumph, but not Figulus, the former must have completed the campaign. The influence and fame of the Cornelii Scipiones, as well as a possible historical account of the campaign by Corculum himself (as he did after Pydna), may explain why he alone received the triumph and was remembered as the winner of the war by some ancient historians—who omitted Figulus, apparently behind most of the campaign.

The confused accounts of Aurelius Victor and Lucius Ampelius, who say that Corculum refused the triumph, are denied by the Fasti Triumphales, although the date is lost; it could have taken place in 155 or 154.

=== Destruction of the stone theatre (154–151 BC) ===
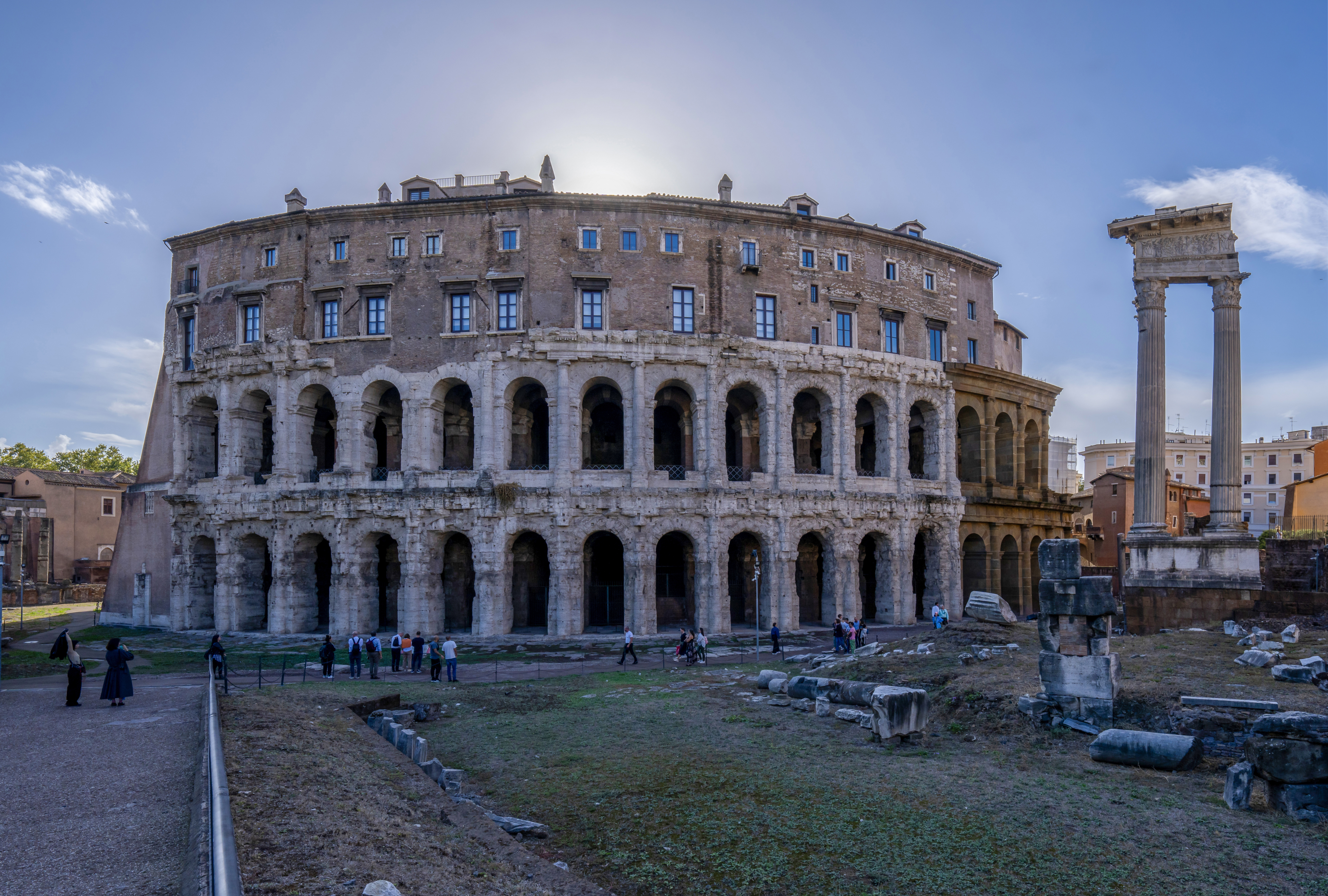
The Theatre of Marcellus, built under Augustus, on the site of the theatre destroyed by Corculum.

In 154 the censors Gaius Cassius Longinus and Marcus Valerius Messala started the construction of the first stone theatre in Rome. In 151, whilst the building was almost complete, Corculum passed a senatus consultum ordering the destruction of the theatre, and auctioning its dismantled elements. This decree—or another—also banned seated stands for games within a radius of one mile from outside the city. Ancient sources tell that, as a firm protector of Roman morality, he considered that Romans had to watch plays standing, because remaining seated was associated with the idleness of the Greeks. This action took place in a general context of reducing the growing influence of Hellenism at Rome, since Cato the Censor also expelled several Greek philosophers the same year. Romans had to wait until the construction of the Theatre of Pompey in 55 to have a permanent structure in stone to watch plays, but the ban on seating while watching plays was perhaps repealed as soon as 145. The place of the theatre of Longinus and Messala was later reused to build the Theatre of Marcellus.

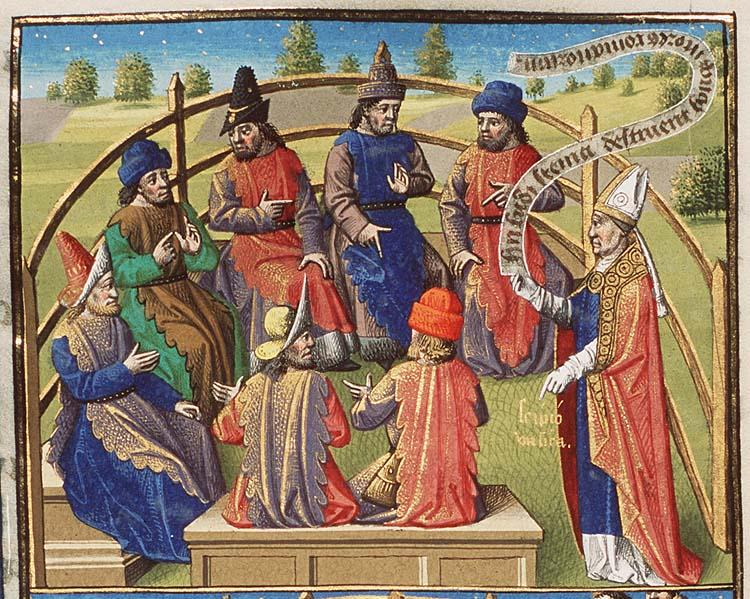

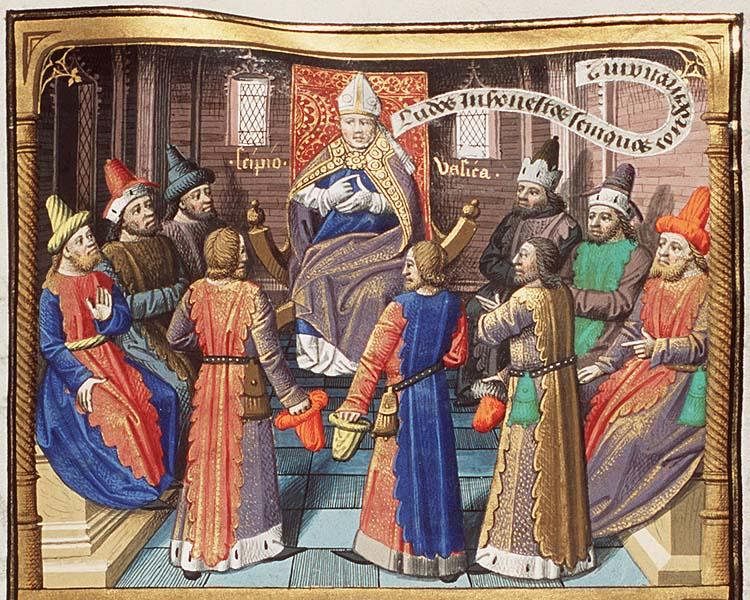
Enluminures of Augustine's City of God by Master François (c. 1475), showing Corculum as bishop (as he was Pontifex Maximus) rejecting the construction of the stone theatre before scholars (top) and senators (bottom).

Modern historians have suggested that Corculum had other motivations. The most common reason advanced by them is that Corculum tried to avoid the danger of creating a permanent place that could have been used for political gatherings—as in Greece political meetings often took place in theatres. Hoffmann furthermore thinks that Corculum—who was a pontiff—wanted to prevent the "secularisation" of theatrical games, which were closely connected to sacred festivals and usually took places near temples. Mazzarino adds that Corculum might have been an enemy of the censor Cassius Longinus, as he had already destroyed the statue of his ancestor during his own censorship. Gruen says that a permanent theatre would have deprived magistrates of some of their authority as they built and destroyed new wood theatres every time they entered and left their office. Author of the longest study on the subject, James Tan suggests that Corculum intended to succeed to Marcus Aemilius Lepidus, who had died in 152, as princeps senatus and pontifex maximus. For this, he had to "demonstrate his worthiness" by appearing as the natural leader of the state. In 151, the Roman political class was shocked by the refusal of many conscripts to serve in Hispania, because they considered the ongoing war to be too dangerous. Corculum might have taken advantage of this event by claiming Roman morals were weakened by cultural innovations, such as a stone theatre; with its destruction, he gained the moral authority he needed for his political ambitions.

=== Opposition to Cato over the fate of Carthage (153–149 BC) ===
Toward the end of the 150s, Corculum clashed with the other champion of Roman morality—Cato the Censor—over the war against Carthage. Their rivalry started after Cato visited Africa in 153 as member of an embassy sent to arbitrate between Massinissa and Carthage, since the former encroached on the lands of the latter. Cato was impressed by the prosperity of the Punic city and noticed that it had "lots of timber", which could be used to build ships (in order to make war against Rome). From this point on, Cato advocated the destruction of Carthage, and concluded all his speeches on any subject with the famous words "Carthage must be destroyed" (Carthago delenda est).

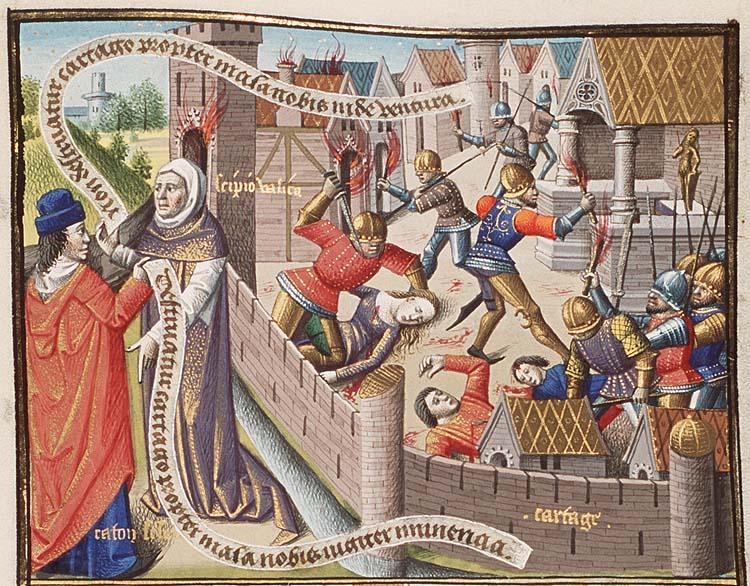

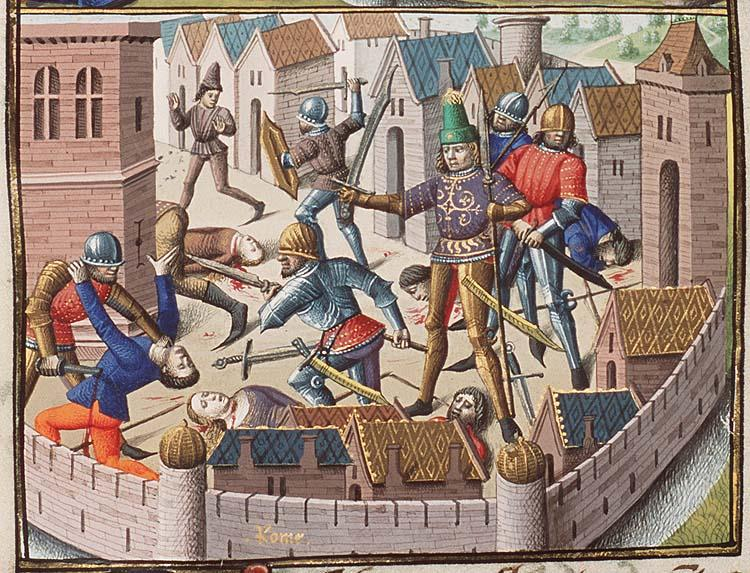
Enluminures of Augustine's City of God by Master François (c. 1475), showing Cato and Corculum debating the fate of Carthage (top) and the civil war in Rome after the destruction of Carthage (bottom).

Ancient authors tell Corculum argued that the loss of Rome's hereditary enemy would result in the decline of Roman morals and discipline, and bring social division, because the fear of Carthage kept the Romans in check. Using the same rhetorical trick as Cato, he ended all his speeches by saying that Carthage must be saved (Carthago servanda est). Cato had actually developed the same argument as Corculum when he spoke against the destruction of Rhodes after it had supported Perseus. Lintott writes that this argument was later embellished by historians living after the Gracchi to explain the hundred years of social crisis that prevailed in Rome once Carthage had been destroyed; Sallust is especially known for having theorised this concept of the necessary fear of a common enemy (Metus hostilis). This gave a prophetic tone to Corculum's speech, and has therefore been doubted by several historians who argue that he could not have foreseen the events of the late Republic. Scholars have given alternative explanations for his opposition to the war. He might have favoured traditional Roman foreign policy of balance of powers, against the new "brute force" policy emerging in this decade (like Carthage, Corinth was razed in 146); or he could have wanted a just cause before declaring war.

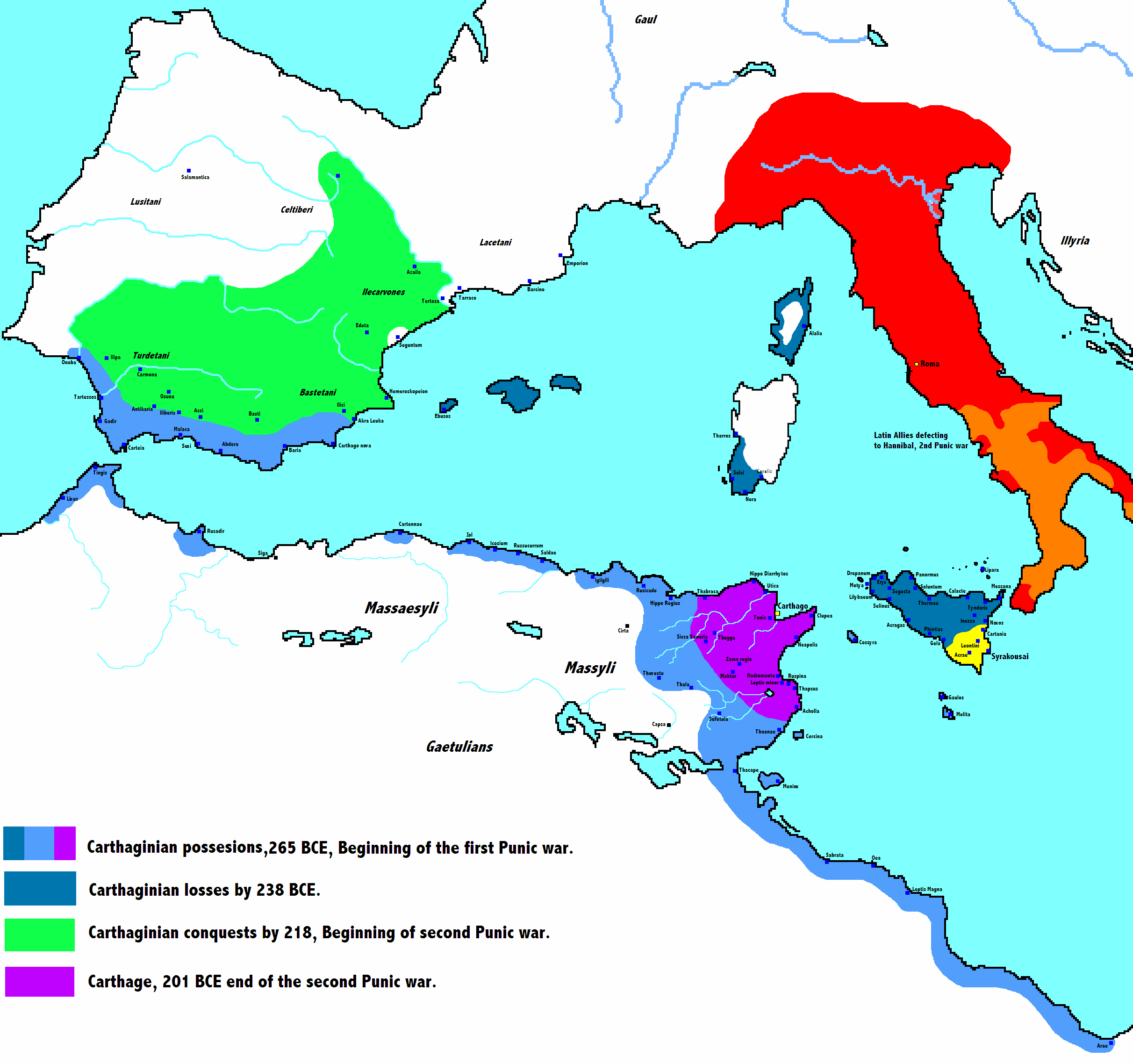
In 149, Carthage controlled only what is now northeastern Tunisia (in purple), a fraction of its former empire.

Initially Corculum had enough support in the senate to reject Cato's proposal. It seems that in 152 he headed an embassy sent to mediate between Carthage and Massinissa. While blaming the former for their military build-up, he forced the latter to withdraw from some of the territories he had conquered, which temporarily removed the threat of a war in the area. Corculum's influence can also be measured by the fact that in 150 he was chosen pontifex maximus—the most important priesthood. Carthage nonetheless attacked the army of Massinissa later in 150, thus breaching the treaty of 201, which stated that Carthage could not wage war without Rome's assent; Carthage therefore gave casus belli to Rome, which finally declared war in the beginning of 149.

In addition to this casus belli, several facts explain how Cato won the decision. Firstly, the influence of the princeps senatus Marcus Aemilius Lepidus was missed in the senate after his death in 152, because like Corculum, he favoured prudent diplomacy. Secondly, Corculum was not in Rome in 149, but in Greece, in order to investigate the situation after the Macedonian Andriskos had revolted against Rome and claimed to be Perseus' son; Corculum organised the defence there by levying an army of Achaean soldiers to hold until a Roman army was sent in 148. Münzer suggests he was sent abroad to weaken the opposition to the war in the senate. Astin furthermore shows that the decisive support for Cato came from Scipio Aemilianus—several later accounts underline their mutual respect—who could capitalise on the illustrious fame of his grandfather Scipio Africanus to get a majority of senators in favour of the destruction of Carthage. Aemilianus and some other leading senators, supported by the people, were probably attracted by the glory and enormous booty they could get by taking Carthage. He may even have sabotaged the peace negotiations between Massinissa and Carthage in 150, in order to make a Roman intervention more likely. Besides, Aemilianus was the friend of Manius Manilius—the consul of 149 who started the operations against Carthage—and personally directed the final assault on the Punic city (in 146). Zonaras wrongly tells that at this occasion Corculum advised sparing the Carthaginians once again.

=== Later years and death (147–141 BC) ===
In 147 Corculum was appointed princeps senatus, which made him the most influential senator, despite his failure against Cato. Lucius Cornelius Lentulus Lupus was likely the censor behind his appointment, as he is the only known senator to have supported his stance on Carthage. Jacques Heurgon thinks that Corculum, supported by the two censors, passed the decree ordering the translation of the books on agriculture by the Punic author Mago, which were seized from Carthage in 146. Corculum was re-appointed princeps in 142 by the censors Scipio Aemilianus and Lucius Mummius Achaicus. Corculum and his predecessor Marcus Aemilius Lepidus were the only two men who held both the offices of leader of the senate and chief priest.

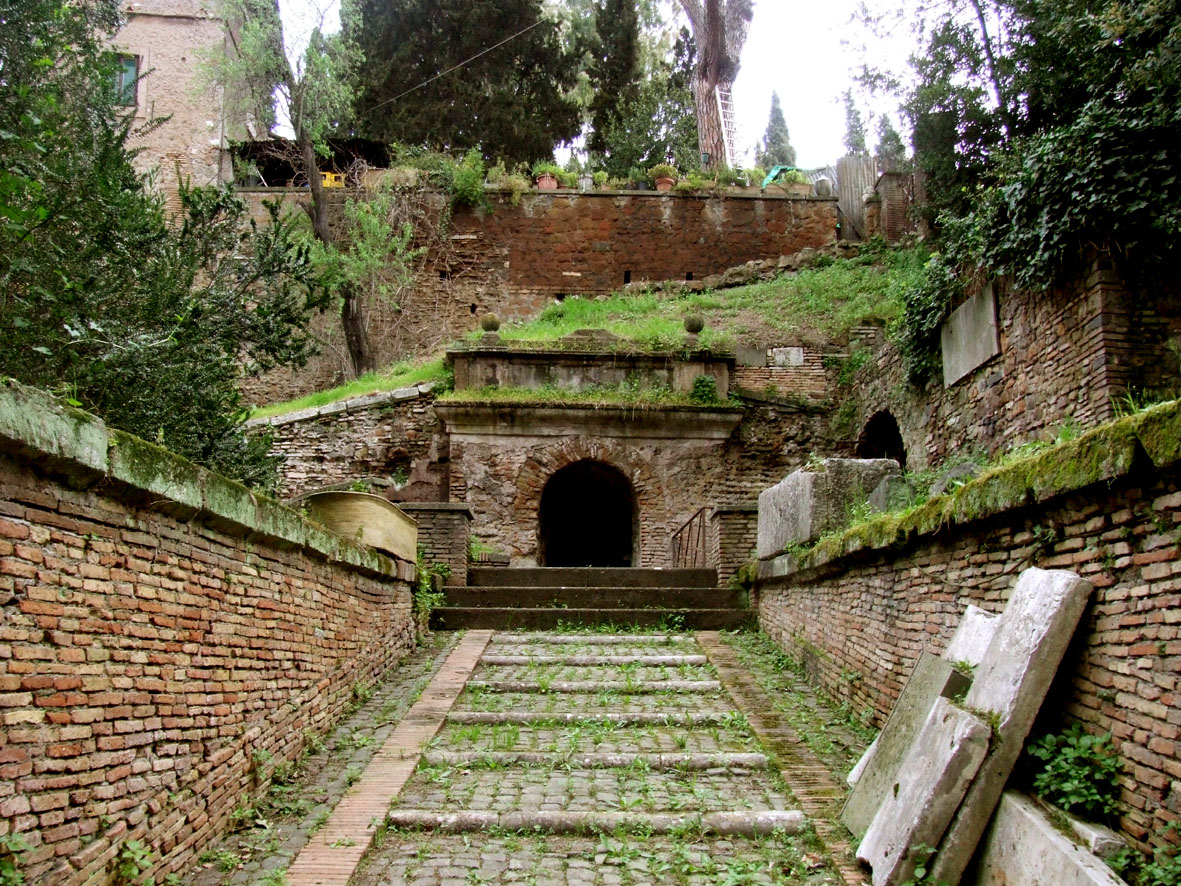
Entrance of the Tomb of the Scipiones, Rome.

Corculum possibly died in 141—perhaps of the plague that broke out the previous year in Rome—because his son Nasica Serapio succeeded him as pontifex maximus that year. Such a succession at the head of the Roman religion was unprecedented. However, neither Corculum's son (consul in 138), nor his grandson (consul in 111) became princeps senatus, contrary to what Diodorus and Valerius Maximus tell; although the leading role Serapio had in the opposition to Tiberius Gracchus shows that he also inherited his father's influence over the senate.

Corculum was likely buried in the Tomb of the Scipiones, located on the Via Appia, in the southeast of Rome. At this time, the familial tomb was the object of a symbolic battle between the two main members of the family, Scipio Aemilianus and Scipio Serapio (Corculum's son). The former reorganised the entrance, where he placed three large statues, including those of Africanus and Asiaticus, but deliberately omitted that of Corculum, whose achievements could have awarded him a statue there. Serapio in turn wrote the epitaph of Scipio Hispanus (who died in 139), in which he alluded to Aemilianus' inability to produce an heir. He also married his son (the consul of 111) to the daughter of Quintus Caecilius Metellus Macedonicus, one of Aemilianus' opponents.

The head of a statue found in the tomb was first described as the "head of Ennius", because it has a laurel-wreath, associated with poets. However, Filippo Coarelli later demonstrated that this association was only made at the time of Horace, while the head dates from the 2nd century BC. Coarelli prefers to see the laurel-wreath as the attribute of a triumphator buried in the tomb; since Africanus was buried in his villa of Liternum, it only leaves Corculum as the man portrayed. Nevertheless, Etcheto considers that the youthful look of the man does not match the advanced age at which Corculum received his triumph, and suggests instead the adoptive brother of Scipio Aemilianus (whose early death triggered Aemilianus' adoption).

== Stemma of the Cornelii Scipiones ==
The relations with the allied families of the Sempronii Gracchi, Aemilii Paulli, and Caecilii Metelli are also shown. Only magistracies attested with certainty in Broughton's Magistrates of the Roman Republic have been mentioned. The dotted lines show adoptions from natural fathers. The name "Cornelius" is implied for all the men named Scipio except for Q. Caecilius Metellus Pius Scipio Nasica.

Legend
Yellow	Censor	Green	Consul

P. Maluginensis; Scipio cos. 395
P. Scipio; Mag. eq. 350	L. Scipio cos. 350
Cn. Scipio
L. Scipio Barbatus cos 298
L. Scipio cos. 259	M'. Pomponius; Matho cos. 233	Cn. Scipio; Asina cos. 260, 254
Cn. Scipio Calvus cos. 222	L. Aemilius Paullus cos. 219, 216	P. Scipio cos. 218	Pomponia	P. Scipio Asina cos. 221
Cn. Scipio; Hispallus cos. 176	P. Scipio Nasica cos. 191	Cornelia	L. Aemilius Paullus; Macedonicus cos. 182, 168 cens. 164	Aemilia; Tertia	P. Scipio Africanus cos. 205, 194 cens. 199	L. Scipio; Asiaticus cos. 190
Cn. Scipio; Hispanus pr. 139	P. Scipio; Nasica Corculum cos. 162, 155 cens. 159	Cornelia	L. Scipio; Africanus pr. 174	P. Scipio Africanus aug. 180	Cornelia	Tib. Sempronius; Gracchus cos. 177, 163	L. Scipio quaes. 167
Cn. Scipio pr. c.109	P. Scipio Nasica Serapio cos. 138	Q. Caecilius Metellus; Macedonicus cos. 143; cens. 131	P. Scipio Aemilianus cos. 147, 134 cens. 142	Sempronia	Tib. Sempronius; Gracchus tr. pl. 133	L. Cornelius; Scipio	Scipio; Asiagenus; Comatus
P. Scipio Nasica cos. 111	Caecilia; Metella	C. Sempronius; Gracchus tr. pl. 123, 122	L. Scipio; Asiaticus cos. 83
Q. Caecilius; Metellus Pius cos. 80	P. Scipio Nasica pr. 93	L. Scipio	Cornelia
Q. Caecilius Metellus; Pius Scipio Nasica cos. 52
P. Licinius; Crassus leg. 54, 53	Cornelia Metella	Cn. Pompeius; Magnus cos. 70, 55, 52

== Legacy ==
Les Antiquitez de Rome, Sonnet 23

O que celui estoit cautement sage
Qui conseilloit pour ne laisser moisir
Ses citoyens en paresseux loisir,
De pardonner aux rempars de Cartage !
Il prevoyoit que le Romain courage
Impatient du languissant plaisir
Par le repos se laisseroit saisir
À la fureur de la civile rage.
Aussi voit-on qu’en un peuple ocieux,
Comme l’humeur en un corps vicieux,
L’ambition facilement s’engendre.
Ce qui advint, quand l’envieux orgueil
De ne vouloir ni plus grand, ni pareil,
Rompit l’accord du beau-pere et du gendre.

— Joachim Du Bellay, 1558

Augustine discusses in lengths Corculum's deeds in The City of God as he liked his attempt to fight the moral corruption of the Roman people, especially his opposition to the destruction of Carthage and his destruction of the theatre. He nonetheless criticises him for not completely banning plays—a weakness he attributes to the fact that the Revelation had not yet taken place.

The Ruins of Rome, Sonnet 23

O wary Wisdom of the Man, that would
That Carthage Towres from Spoil should be forborn!
To th' end that his victorious People should
With cankring Leisure not be overworn;
He well foresaw, how that the Roman Courage,
Impatient of Pleasure's faint Desires,
Through Idleness, would turn to civil Rage,
And be her self the Matter of her Fires.
For in a People given all to Ease,
Ambition is engendred easily;
As in a vicious Body, gross Disease
Soon grows through Humours Superfluity.
That came to pass, when swoln with Plenty's Pride,
Nor Prince, nor Peer, nor Kin they Would abide.

— Edmund Spenser, 1591

In 1558 the French poet Joachim Du Bellay published Les Antiquitez de Rome (translated as The Ruins of Rome by Edmund Spenser), in which the entire 23rd sonnet is devoted to Corculum (although he is not named directly). Du Bellay praised his opposition to the war against Carthage.

In the late 16th and early 17th century England, Puritans led a long campaign against theatres, which they considered a source of depravity, culminating with their interdiction in 1642. Therefore, Corculum frequently appears in pamphlets of the era, such as those written by John Northbrooke (1577), Stephen Gosson (1582), Philip Stubbes (1583), Philip Sidney (1595) Thomas Beard (1597), and John Rainolds (1599).

The French avant-garde playwright Antonin Artaud mentions Corculum in his essay The Theatre and its Double (published in 1938), about the destruction of the stone theatre.

In 1983, three theatre students—Eda Čufer, Dragan Živadinov and Miran Mohar—inspired by Artaud's reference of Corculum, founded the Scipion Nasice Sisters Theatre in Ljubljana. The theatre was scheduled to last four years, after which its founders closed it (in 1987), hence why they took Corculum's name. The theatre was a leading avant-garde and subversive spot in 1980's Yugoslavia.

== Bibliography ==
=== Ancient sources ===
- Lucius Ampelius, Liber Memorialis.
- Appianus Alexandrinus (Appian), The Illyrian Wars, Punica.
- Augustine of Hippo, The City of God.
- Aurelius Victor, De Viris Illustribus Romae.
- Marcus Tullius Cicero, Brutus, De Oratore, Tusculanae Disputationes.
- Diodorus Siculus, Bibliotheca Historica.
- Fasti Capitolini.
- The Digest.
- Florus, Epitome.
- Sextus Julius Frontinus, Strategemata (Stratagems).
- Aulus Gellius, Noctes Atticae.
- Titus Livius (Livy), Ab Urbe Condita Libri, Periochae.
- Julius Obsequens, Liber de prodigiis (Book of Prodigies).
- Paulus Orosius, Historiarum Adversum Paganos (History Against the Pagans).
- Gaius Plinius Secundus (Pliny the Elder), Historia Naturalis (Natural History).
- Plutarch, Parallel lives.
- Polybius, Historiae (The Histories).
- Gaius Sallustius Crispus (Sallust), The Conspiracy of Catiline, The Jugurthine War.
- Strabo, Geographica.
- Valerius Maximus, Factorum ac Dictorum Memorabilium (Memorable Deeds and Sayings).
- Marcus Terentius Varro, De lingua latina (Latin Language).
- Marcus Velleius Paterculus, Compendium of Roman History.
- Johannes Zonaras, Epitome.

=== Modern sources ===
- F. E. Adcock, "'Delenda Est Carthago'", in The Cambridge Historical Journal, Vol. 8, No. 3 (1946), pp. 117–128.
- Antonin Artaud, The Theatre and its Double, translated from French by Mary Caroline Richards, New York, 1958 (originally published in French in 1938).
- Alan E. Astin, "Scipio Aemilianus and Cato Censorius", in Latomus, T. 15, Fasc. 2 (April–June 1956), pp. 159–180.
- ——, Scipio Aemilianus, Oxford University Press, 1967.
- ——, Cato the Censor, Oxford University Press, 1978.
- Zdenka Badovinac, Eda Čufer, Anthony Gardner (editors), NSK from Kapital to Capital, Neue Slowenische Kunst—an Event of the Final Decade of Yugoslavia, MIT Press, 2015.
- Gino Bandelli, "Sui Rapporti Politici tra Scipione Nasica e Scipione Africano (204–184 A.C.)", in Quaderno di Storia Antica e di Epigrafia, Rome, Edizioni Dell'Ateneo, 1973.
- Donald Walter Baronowski, "Polybius on the Causes of the Third Punic War", in Classical Philology, Vol. 90, No. 1 (Jan., 1995), pp. 16–31.
- Richard A. Bauman, Lawyers in Roman Republican Politics, C. H. Beck, Munich, 1983.
- Hans Beck, Antonio Duplá, Martin Jehne, Francisco Pina Polo, Consuls and Res Publica: Holding High Office in the Roman Republic, Cambridge University Press, 2011.
- Paula Botteri, "Diodore de Sicile, 34-35, 33, un problème d'exégèse", in Ktema, n°5, 1980, pp. 77–87.
- T. Corey Brennan, The Praetorship in the Roman Republic, Oxford University Press, 2000.
- John Briscoe, "Eastern Policy and Senatorial Politics 168-146 B.C.", Historia: Zeitschrift für Alte Geschichte, Bd. 18, H. 1 (Jan., 1969), pp. 49–70.
- ——, "Supporters and Opponents of Tiberius Gracchus", The Journal of Roman Studies, Vol. 64 (1974), pp. 125–135.
- ——, A Commentary on Livy, Books 38–40, Oxford University Press, 2007.
- ——, A Commentary on Livy, Books 41–45, Oxford University Press, 2012.
- T. Robert S. Broughton, The Magistrates of the Roman Republic, American Philological Association, 1951–1952.
- Paul J. Burton, Friendship and Empire, Roman Diplomacy and Imperialism in the Middle Republic (353–146 BC), Cambridge University Press, 2011.
- ——, Rome and the Third Macedonian War, Cambridge University Press, 2017.
- José M. Candau, "Republican Rome: Autobiography and Political Struggles", in Gabriele Marasco (editor), Political Autobiographies and Memoirs in Antiquity, Leiden/Boston, Brill, 2011, pp. 121–159.
- Craige Brian Champion, Cultural Politics in Polybius's Histories, University of California Press, 2004.
- ——, The Peace of the Gods, Elite Religious Practices in the Middle Roman Republic, Princeton University Press, 2017.
- Filippo Coarelli, Revixit ars. Arte ideologia a Roma. Dai modelli ellenistici alla tradizione repubblicana, Quasar, 1996.
- ——, "I ritratti di ‘Mario’ e ‘Silla’ a Monaco e il sepolcro degli Scipioni", Eutopia nuova serie, II/ 1, 2002, pp. 47–75.
- Tim Cornell (editor), The Fragments of the Roman Historians, Oxford University Press, 2013.
- Michael Crawford & Filippo Coarelli, "Public Building in Rome between the Second Punic War and Sulla", in Papers of the British School at Rome, Vol. 45 (1977), pp. 1–-23.
- J. A. Crook, F. W. Walbank, M. W. Frederiksen, R. M. Ogilvie (editors), The Cambridge Ancient History, vol. VIII, Rome and the Mediterranean to 133 B.C., Cambridge University Press, 1989.
- Penelope J. E. Davies, Roman Architecture and Politics, Cambridge University Press, 2017.
- Robert J. Dodaro, Christ and the Just Society in the Thought of Augustine, Cambridge University Press, 2004.
- George Eckel Duckworth, The Nature of Roman Comedy: A Study in Popular Entertainment, Bristol Classical Press, 1994.
- Danijel Dzino, Illyricum in Roman Politics, 29 BC – AD 68, Cambridge University Press, 2010.
- Henri Etcheto, Les Scipions. Famille et pouvoir à Rome à l’époque républicaine, Bordeaux, Ausonius Éditions, 2012.
- James Fujitani, "Stoicism and History in Joachim Du Bellay's Antiquitez de Rome", Renaissance and Reformation, Vol. 33, No. 2 (Spring 2010), pp. 63–92.
- Alison Futrell, Blood in the Arena: The Spectacle of Roman Power, Austin, University of Texas Press, 1997.
- Erich S. Gruen, Culture and National Identity in Republican Rome, Ithaca, Cornell University Press, 1992.
- N. G. L. Hammond and F. W. Walbank, A History of Macedonia, Volume III: 336-167 B.C., Clarendon Press, Oxford, 1988.
- Jill Harries, Cicero and the Jurists, London, Duckworth, 2006.
- Jacques Heurgon, "L'agronome carthaginois Magon et ses traducteurs en latin et en grec", Comptes rendus des séances de l'Académie des Inscriptions et Belles-Lettres, 1976, n°120-3, pp. 441–456.
- Wilhelm Hoffmann, "Die römische Politik des 2. Jahrhunderts und das Ende Karthagos", in Historia: Zeitschrift für Alte Geschichte, Bd. 9, H. 3 (Jul., 1960), pp. 309–344.
- Oliver D. Hoover, Handbook of Coins of Macedon and Its Neighbors. Part I: Macedon, Illyria, and Epeiros, Sixth to First Centuries BC [The Handbook of Greek Coinage Series, Volume 3], Lancaster/London, Classical Numismatic Group, 2016.
- Timothy Howe, E. Edward Garvin, and Graham Wrightson, Greece, Macedonia, and Persia, Studies in Social, Political and Military History in Honour of Waldemar Heckel, Oxford, Oxbow Books, 2014.
- Alexandre de Laborde, Les Manuscrits à peinture de la Cité de Dieu de Saint-Augustin, Paris, 1909.
- Jerzy Linderski, "Roman Officers in the Year of Pydna", in The American Journal of Philology, Vol. 111, No. 1 (Spring, 1990), pp. 53–71.
- Andrew W. Lintott, "Imperial Expansion and Moral Decline in the Roman Republic", Historia: Zeitschrift für Alte Geschichte, Bd. 21, H. 4 (4th Qtr., 1972), pp. 626–638.
- John Ma, Statues and Cities: Honorific Portraits and Civic Identity in the Hellenistic World, Oxford University Press, 2013.
- Gesine Manuwald, Roman Republican Theatre, Cambridge University Press, 2011.
- Santo Mazzarino, Il pensiero storico classico, Volume 2, Part 1, Bari, Laterza, 1966.
- Lisa Marie Mignone, The Republican Aventine and Rome's Social Order, University of Michigan Press, 2016.
- John F. Miller & A. F. Woodman, Latin Historiography and Poetry in the Early Empire, Leiden/Boston, Brill, 2010.
- M. Gwyn Morgan, "The Introduction of the Aqua Marcia into Rome, 144–40 B.C.", in Philologus, Volume 122, Issue 1-2 (1978), pp. 25–58.
- ——, "The Perils of Schematism: Polybius, Antiochus Epiphanes and the 'Day of Eleusis'", in Historia: Zeitschrift für Alte Geschichte, Bd. 39, H. 1 (1990), pp. 37–76.
- Friedrich Münzer, Roman Aristocratic Parties and Families, translated by Thérèse Ridley, Johns Hopkins University Press, 1999 (originally published in 1920).
- Pantelis Nigdelis, Pavlos Anagnostoudis, "New Honorific Inscriptions from Amphipolis", Greek, Roman, and Byzantine Studies, Vol 57, No 2 (2017), pp. 295–324.
- John A. North, "Family Strategy and Priesthood in the late Republic", Publications de l'École Française de Rome, 129 (1990), pp. 527–543.
- O'Gorman, Ellen (Spring–Fall 2004). "Cato the elder and the destruction of Carthage". Helios. 31: 96–123. Archived from the original on 2019-04-28 – via Questia.
- August Pauly, Georg Wissowa, Friedrich Münzer, et alii, Realencyclopädie der Classischen Altertumswissenschaft (abbreviated PW), J. B. Metzler, Stuttgart, 1894–1980.
- Tanya Pollard (editor), Shakespeare's theater : a sourcebook, Oxford, Blackwell, 2004.
- Emmanuel Rodocanachi, The Roman Capitol in ancient and modern times, University of Michigan, 1906.
- Vincent J. Rosivach, "The "Lex Fannia Sumptuaria" of 161 BC", The Classical Journal, Vol. 102, No. 1 (Oct. - Nov., 2006), pp. 1–15.
- Francis X. Ryan, Rank and Participation in the Republican Senate, Stuttgart, Franz Steiner Verlag, 1998.
- Marjeta Šašel Kos, Appian and Illyricum, Narodni Muzej Slovenije, 2005.
- Howard Hayes Scullard, Roman Politics 220–150 B. C., Oxford University Press, 1951.
- Christopher Smith, Kaj Sandberg (editors), Omnium Annalium Monumenta: Historical Writing and Historical Evidence in Republican Rome, Leiden & Boston, Brill, 2017.
- W. Soltau, "P. Cornelius Scipio Nasica als Quelle Plutarchs", Hermes, Bd. 31, H. 1 (1896), pp. 155–160.
- Graham Vincent Sumner, The Orators in Cicero's Brutus: Prosopography and Chronology, (Phoenix Supplementary Volume XI.), Toronto and Buffalo, University of Toronto Press, 1973.
- Jaakko Suolahti, The Roman Censors, a study on social structure, Helsinki, Suomalainen Tiedeakatemia, 1963.
- Ronald Syme & Anthony R. Birley (editor), Roman Papers, vol. VI, Oxford, Clarendon Press, 1991.
- G. J. Szemler, Priests of the Roman Republic, A Study of Interactions between Priesthoods and Magistracies, Bruxelles, Latomus, 1972.
- James K. Tan, "The Ambitions of Scipio Nasica and the Destruction of the Stone Theatre", Antichthon, vol. 50 (Nov. 2016), pp. 70–79.
- Lily Ross Taylor and T. Robert S. Broughton, "The Order of the Two Consuls' Names in the Yearly Lists", Memoirs of the American Academy in Rome, 19 (1949), pp. 3–14.
- ——, The Voting Districts of the Roman Republic, University of Michigan Press, 1960.
- Ann Vasaly, Representations: Images of the World in Ciceronian Oratory, Berkeley & Los Angeles, University of California Press, 1993.
- Ursula Vogel-Weidemann, "Carthago Delenda Est: Aita and Prophasis", in Acta Classica, XXXII (1989), pp. 79–95.
- Frank William Walbank, A Commentary on Polybius, Oxford University Press, 1979.
- Andrew Wallace-Hadrill, "Roman arches and Greek honours: the language of power at Rome", in Proceedings of the Cambridge Philological Society, 36, 1990, pp. 143–181.
- P. G. Walsh, "Massinissa", The Journal of Roman Studies, Vol. 55, No. 1/2, Parts 1 and 2 (1965), pp. 149–160.
- Everett L. Wheeler, "'Sapiens' and Stratagems: The Neglected Meaning of a 'Cognomen'", Historia: Zeitschrift für Alte Geschichte, Bd. 37, H. 2 (2nd Qtr., 1988), pp. 166–195.
- John Wilkes, The Illyrians, Oxford, Blackwell, 1995.
- Emanuela Zanda, Fighting Hydra-like Luxury: Sumptuary Regulation in the Roman Republic, London/New York, Bloomsbury, 2011.
- Adam Ziolkowski, "The Plundering of Epirus in 167 B.C: Economic Considerations", in Papers of the British School at Rome, Vol. 54 (1986), pp. 69–80.

Political offices
Preceded by Ti. Sempronius Gracchus; Manius Juventius Thalna	Roman consul 162 BC (resigned); With: G. Marcius Figulus	Succeeded by P. Cornelius Lentulus; Gn. Domitius Ahenobarbus as suffecti
Preceded by L. Aemilius Paullus; Q. Marcius Philippus	Roman censor 159–158 BC; With: M. Popillius Laenas	Succeeded by M. Valerius Messalla; G. Cassius Longinus
Preceded by L. Cornelius Lentulus Lupus; G. Marcius Figulus	Roman consul II; 155 BC; With: M. Claudius Marcellus	Succeeded by Q. Opimius; L. Postumius Albinus
Preceded by Marcus Aemilius Lepidus	Princeps senatus 147–141 BC	Succeeded by Appius Claudius Pulcher
