= Cohors VII Delmatarum equitata =

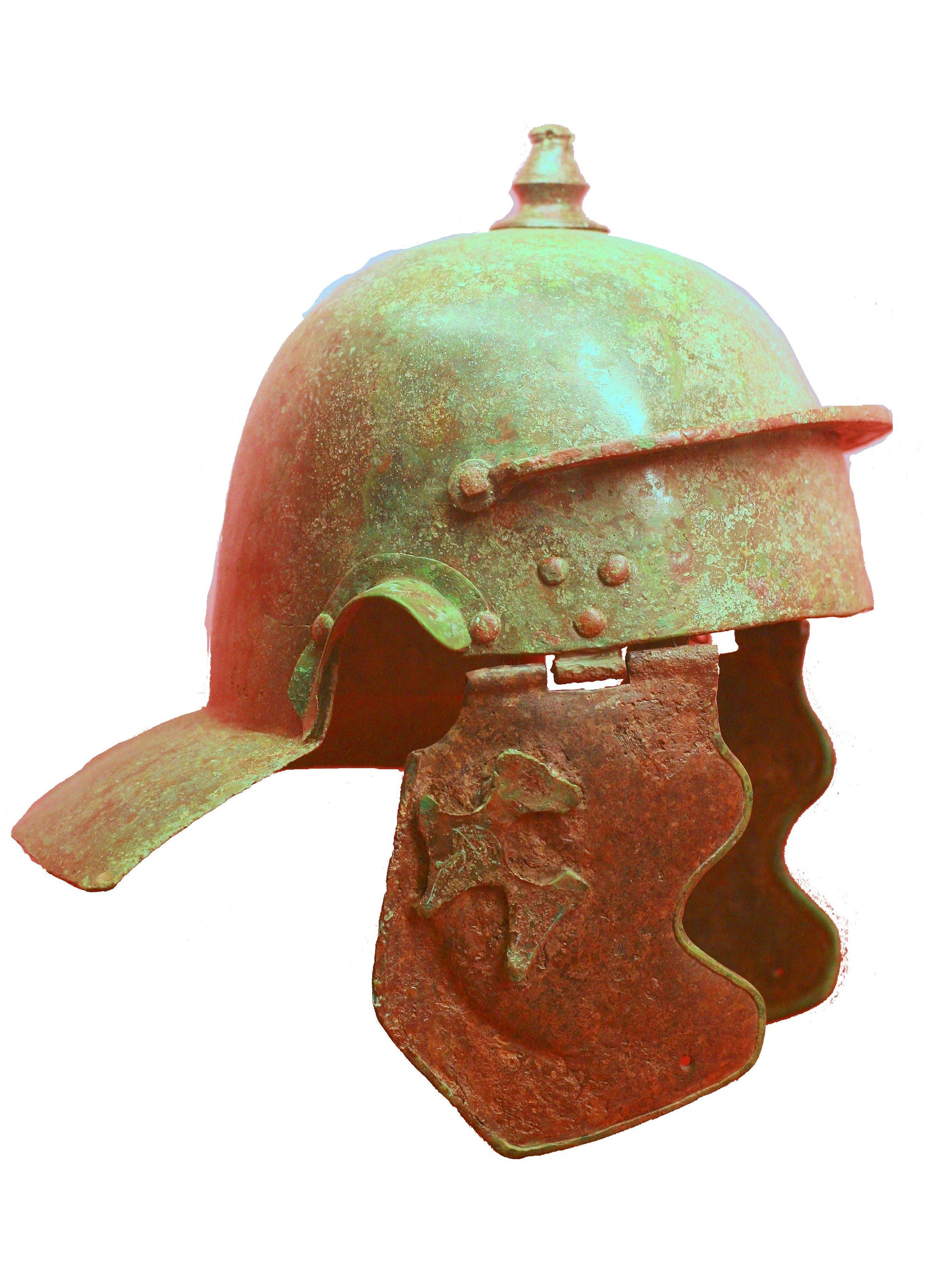
- Roman infantry helmet (late 1st century)
- Active: 1st century
- Country: Roman Empire
- Type: Roman auxiliary cohort
- Role: infantry/cavalry
- Size: 600 men (480 infantry, 120 cavalry)
- Garrison/HQ: Mauretania Caesariensis 1st century

Cohors septima Delmatarum equitata ("7th part-mounted Cohort of Dalmatae") was a Roman auxiliary mixed infantry and cavalry regiment. It is named after the Dalmatae, an Illyrian-speaking tribe that inhabited the Adriatic coastal mountain range of the eponymous Dalmatia. The ancient geographer Strabo describes these mountains as extremely rugged, and the Dalmatae as backward and warlike. He claims that they did not use money long after their neighbours adopted it and that they "made war on the Romans for a long time". He also criticises the Dalmatae, a nation of pastoralists, for turning fertile plains into sheep pasture. Indeed, the name of the tribe itself is believed to mean "shepherds", derived from the Illyrian word delme ("sheep"). The final time this people fought against Rome was in the Illyrian revolt of 6-9 AD. The revolt was started by Dalmatae auxiliary forces and soon spread all over Dalmatia and Pannonia. The resulting war was described by the Roman writer Suetonius as the most difficult faced by Rome since the Punic Wars two centuries earlier. But after the war, the Dalmatae became a loyal and important source of recruits for the Roman army.

According to Holder, a total of 12 cohortes Delmatarum appear to have been raised after the suppression of the Illyrian revolt in two series, of 7 and 5 respectively. All these units were in existence by the time of emperor Claudius (r. 41-54) Of these, 9 appear to have survived into the 2nd century.

The regiment was probably raised by founder-emperor Augustus (r. 30BC-14AD) after 9 AD. It was certainly in existence by the time of Claudius (r. 41-54). There is no diploma evidence for this regiment and the remaining inscriptions cannot be accurately dated. However, it is certain that it was serving in Mauretania Caesariensis in the 1st century. It is unlikely to have continued there into the 2nd century, as it is missing in the diploma list for 107. All its surviving inscriptions have been found on one site, Cherchel (Algeria), presumably its regular base, perhaps shared with its sister regiment VI Delmatarum eq. Given the complete absence of later evidence, it is likely that the regiment was disbanded or destroyed in action by the end of the 1st century.

The names of one decurio (cavalry officer) and 2 caligati (common soldiers) are attested, the latter Illyrians.

== See also ==
- List of Roman auxiliary regiments
