= Maria Rika Maniates =

Canadian musicologist

- Born: March 30, 1937; Toronto, Ontario, Canada
- Died: October 20, 2011 (aged 74); Toronto, Ontario, Canada
- Occupation: Musicologist

Academic background
- Education: The Royal Conservatory of Music
- Alma mater: University of Toronto; Columbia University

Academic work
- Institutions: University of Toronto Faculty of Music; University of Toronto Faculty of Arts and Science; Columbia University

Maria Rika Maniates (March 30, 1937 – October 20, 2011) was a Canadian musicologist who taught at the University of Toronto. She began her career as a lecturer at the University of Toronto Faculty of Music in 1965 and held various positions in the department, such as associate professor and full professor of musicology. Over the course of her career, Maniates was a member of multiple music councils and music societies and was director-at-large of the American Musicological Society. Following her retirement from the University of Toronto in 1995, she was made professor emerita. Maniates examined music in papers delivered to Canada and the United States and contributed to The New Grove Dictionary of Music and Musicians as well as various musicological journals.

== Early life ==
Maniates was born on March 30, 1937, in Toronto, Ontario. She was the daughter of Sophia and Euripides Maniates and had four siblings. At age three, Maniates began studying the piano, with Margaret Butler and Marian Grudeff at The Royal Conservatory of Music (RCM). She graduated from the RCM in 1956, and earned a Bachelor of Arts degree from the University of Toronto four years later. In 1962, Maniates earned a Master of Arts degree in renaissance music from Columbia University; she accepted two out of a possible seven grants, a Columbia Fellowship and a Woodrow Wilson Fellowship. Three years later, Maniates graduated from Columbia University with a Doctor of Philosophy degree in renaissance music; she earned a Canada Council fellowship worth $2,000, a President's fellowship and the Rockefeller Grant in musicology.

== Career ==
She joined the staff of the University of Toronto Faculty of Music as a music lecturer in 1965, and also joined the University of Toronto Faculty of Arts and Science. The following year, Maniates was appointed assistant professor of the School of Graduate Studies. She was also the Early Music Group's director from 1965 to 1967, and was the graduate department of music's academic secretary between 1968 and 1969 and again from 1972 to 1973. Between 1969 and 1970, Maniates was a member of the board on The Renaissance Society of America and served as president of the Toronto Renaissance and Reformation Colloquium. She was made associate professor at the University of Toronto Faculty of Music in 1970 before she was appointed full professor of musicology four years later. Maniates was made chair of the department of history and literature of music which she held from 1973 to 1978.

In mid-1967 and late 1976, she was a visiting professor of music at Columbia University, and in 1975, was the International Musicological Society's delegate on the International Music Council's governing council. In 1979, Maniates was named a fellow of the University of Toronto's Victoria College, for which the contributed to its program in renaissance studies and their Centre for Reformation and Renaissance Studies. She was also a member of the council of the American Musicological Society (AMS) twice between 1972 and 1974 and from 1976 to 1978 before she served as its director-at-large from 1980 to 1981. Maniates was on the executive board of IMS from 1972 to 1982 and was a member of the AMS committee between 1989 and 1993. Between 1990 and 1991, she was the University of Toronto's associate dean of humanities before being appointed assistant dean, a position she held between 1991 and 1992. Maniates served as vice-dean of graduate studies at the university between 1991 and 1993 and again in 1995. She was also acting chair of the music's graduate department in 1992. In 1995, Maniates retired from the university, and was made professor emerita.

In addition to her university work, she examined music within the context of "the history of ideas, philosophy, and aesthetics", focusing on mannerism in music as well as focusing on controversies in major music theorists over the course of the 16th century in papers that she delivered in Canada and the United States in the 1980s. Maniates also worked on ancient Greek concepts of music, the history on how they were received and examining methodologies in musicology. She was given support in her work by the Social Sciences and Humanities Research Council, earning the Connaught Senior Fellowship in the Humanities in 1982 and the ASCAP-Deems Taylor Award for Excellence in 1985. From 1963 to 1964, Maniates was Current Musicology's associate director and held the same position at Renaissance and Reformation between 1970 and 1972. She was part of the editorial board for Canadian University Music Review from 1982 and 1989 and again between 1992 and 1994. She consulted for organizations such as the Canadian Broadcasting Corporation, the Ontario Council for the Arts, and contributed to The New Grove Dictionary of Music and Musicians as well as several musicology journals.

== Personal life ==
Maniates died at the Toronto Grace Health Centre, on October 20, 2011, while getting palliative care for cancer. She received a funeral service at St. Thomas's Anglican Church four days later and was buried at Mount Pleasant Cemetery that same day.
