= Gnaeus Domitius Ahenobarbus (consul 162 BC) =

Roman Consul in 162 BC

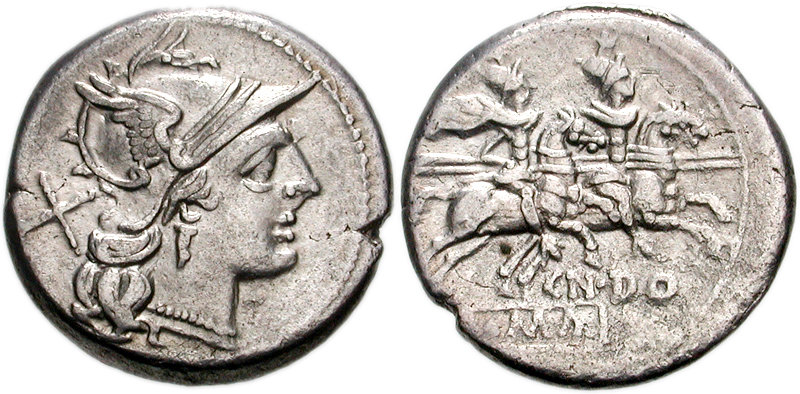
Denarius
Helmeted head of Roma right; X (mark of value) behind.	Dioscuri on horseback riding right. Below CN • DO; ROMA in exergue in tablet
AR; 18mm; 4.17 g; Rome mint.

Gnaeus Domitius Ahenobarbus was son of the Gnaeus Domitius Ahenobarbus who had been consul in 192 BC, was chosen pontifex in 172 BC when still a young man, and in 169 BC was sent with two others as commissioners into Macedonia. In 167 BC he was one of the ten commissioners for arranging the affairs of Macedonia in conjunction with Aemilius Paulus; and when the consuls of 162 BC abdicated on account of some fault in the auspices in their election, he and Cornelius Lentulus were chosen consuls in their stead.

== Children ==
He was the father of Gnaeus Domitius Ahenobarbus, who was consul in 122 BC.

Preceded by P. Cornelius Scipio Nasica Corculum and C. Marcius Figulus	Suffect consul of the Roman Republic with P. Cornelius Lentulus; 162 BC	Succeeded by M. Valerius Messalla and C. Fannius Strabo
