= Dalmatae =

Illyrian people in the western Balkans

The Dalmatae, alternatively Delmatae, during the Roman period, were a group of Illyrian tribes in Dalmatia, contemporary southern Croatia and western Bosnia and Herzegovina. The region of Dalmatia takes its name from the tribe.

The Delmatae appear in historical record for the first time in 181 BC, when upon the death of their ruler Pleuratus III of the Illyrian kingdom, they refused to accept the rule of his son, Gentius and seceded. They expanded and came to include coastal Illyrian tribes like the Tariotes, the Hylli and the Nesti and increased their territory to the north against the Liburni. Conflict with Roman expansionism and its local allies in the eastern Adriatic began in 156–55 BC. The Roman–Dalmatae Wars lasted until 33 BC when Octavian (the later Emperor Augustus) installed Roman hegemony in Dalmatia. Local instability and minor rebellions continued in the province of Dalmatia and culminated in the Great Illyrian Revolt in Dalmatia and closely linked Pannonia in 6 AD. The revolt, which lasted for three years, involved more than half a million combatants, auxiliaries and civilians on both sides. In the aftermath, some Delmataean communities were relocated in the northern Sandzak region and others were resettled in parts of Carinthia to provide labor for the Roman mines. The defeat of the revolt began the integration of Dalmatia which in turn led to the romanization of the region by the early Middle Ages.

== Name ==
The original form of the name of the tribe is Delmatae, and shares the same root with the regional name Dalmatia and the toponym Delminium. It is considered to be connected to the Albanian dele and its variants which include the Gheg form delmë, meaning "sheep", and to the Albanian term delmer, "shepherd". According to Orel, the Gheg form delme hardly has anything in common with the name of Dalmatia because it represents a variant of dele with *-mā, which is ultimately from proto-Albanian *dailā. Toponyms linked to the name are found throughout the territories inhabited by Illyrians including the chief settlement of the Delmatae, Delminium and Dalmana in present-day N. Macedonia. The medieval Slavic toponym Ovče Pole ("plain of sheep" in South Slavic) in the nearby region represents a related later development. In Albania, Delvinë represents a toponym linked to the root *dele. The form Dalmatae and the respective regional name Dalmatia are later variants as is already noted by Appian (2nd century AD). His contemporary grammarian Velius Longus highlights in his treatise about orthography that the correct form of Dalmatia is Delmatia, and notes that Marcus Terentius Varro who lived about 2 centuries prior of Appian and Velius Longius, used the form Delmatia as it corresponded to the chief settlement of the tribe, Delminium. The toponym Duvno is a derivation from Delminium in Croatian via an intermediate form *Delminio in late antiquity.

== History ==
The Delmatae appear in historical record in 181 BC. The death of Pleuratus III of the Illyrian kingdom and the succession by his son Gentius led the Delmatae to not recognize his rule and secede altogether. The Daorsi, who lived to the south of the Delmatae did the same. Over the centuries, the Delmatae and Ardiaei were among the Illyrian groups which expanded their territory northwards at the expense of the Liburni. They Delmatae may have been originally pushed towards the coast because of Celtic migrations in Pannonia Strabo writes that the territory of the Delmatae was divided into an inland (present-day Tropolje) and a coastal region by the Dinaric Alps. Their capital settlement Delminium was located close to present-day Tomislavgrad.

The first Dalmatian war in 156–155 BC finished with the destruction of capital Delminium by consul Scipio Nasica. The second Dalmatian war was fought in 119–118 BC, apparently ending in Roman victory as consul L. Caecilius Metellus celebrated triumph in 117 BC and assumed his surname Delmaticus. The third Dalmatian war 78–76 BC finished with the capture of Salona (port Solin near modern city Split) by the proconsul C. Cosconius.

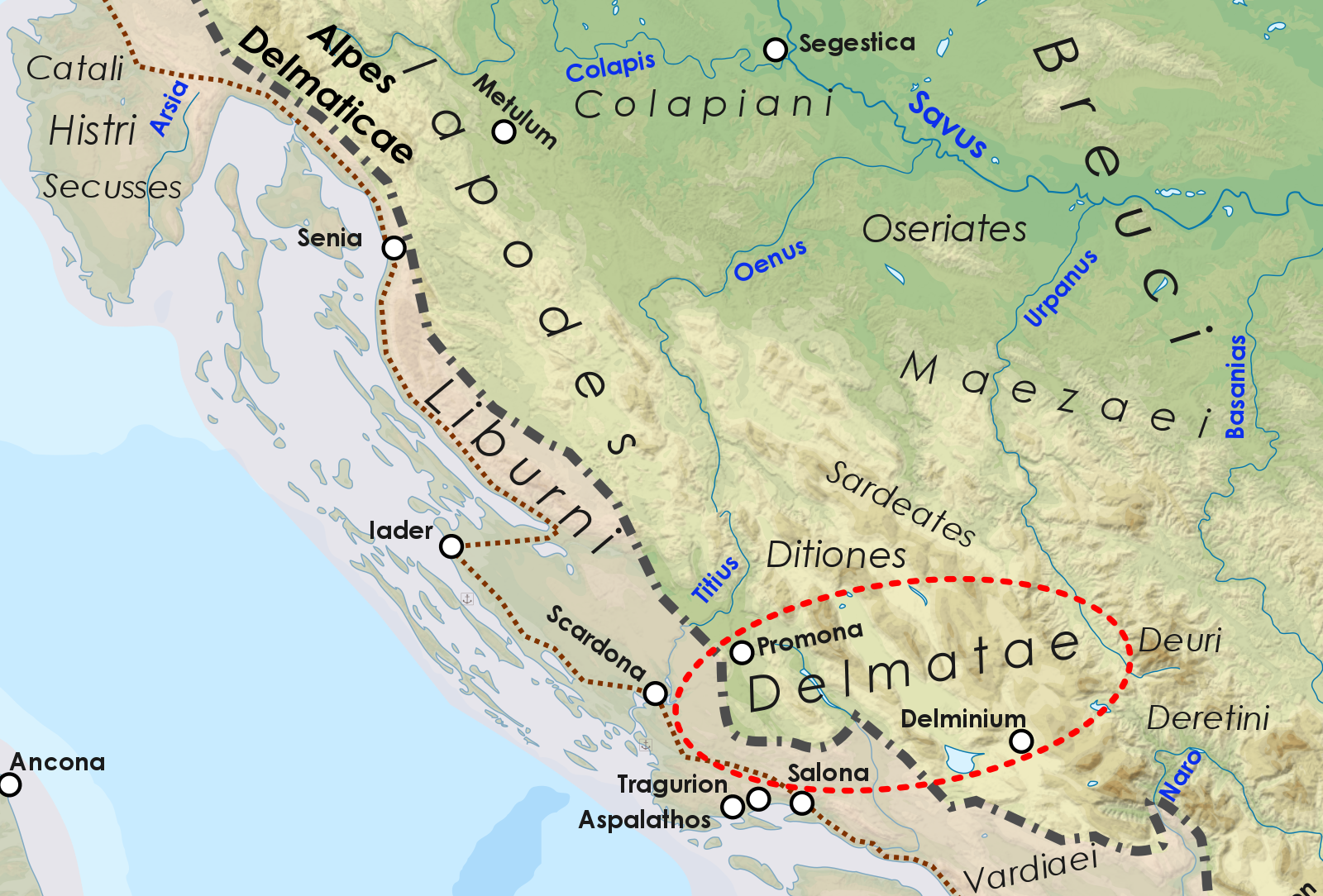
Delmatae in Illyricum, c. 40 BC.

During the Roman Civil War of 49–44 BC, the Delmatae supported Pompey against the coastal Roman colonies which supported Caesar and continuously fought against the Caesarian generals Gabinius and Vatinius. After Pompey's defeat they continued to fight against Roman legions in Dalmatia. The fourth and final conflict occurred 34–33 BC during Octavian's expedition to Illyricum because of their iterative revolts, and finished with the capture of the new Delmatian capital- Soetovio (now Klis). The last revolts of Delmatae under their federal leader Bato, against Romans were in 12 BC and the Great Illyrian Revolt in 6–9 AD; both also failed and finished by a terminal pacification of bellicose Delmatae.

== Cohors Delmatarum ==
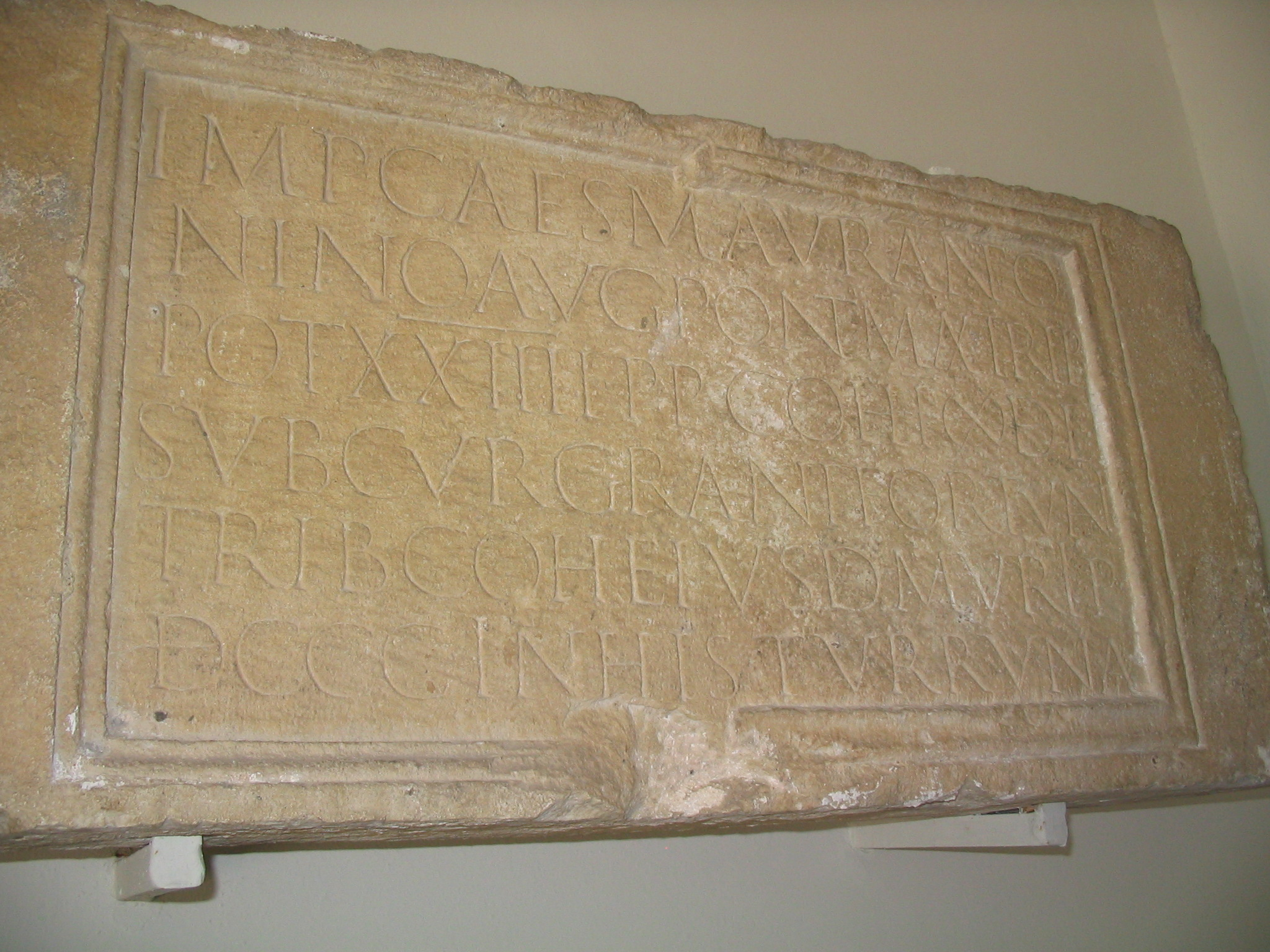
The Inscription of the Coh(ors) I (milliaria) Del(matarum) in Salona.

In Roman Imperial times the Dalmatae formed numerous Roman auxiliaries:

- Cohors I Delmatarum
- Cohors I Delmatarum milliaria equitata
- Cohors II Delmatarum
- Cohors III Delmatarum equitata c.R. pf
- Cohors IV Delmatarum
- Cohors V Delmatarum
- Cohors V Delmatarum c.R.
- Cohors VI Delmatarum equitata
- Cohors VII Delmatarum equitata
- And later the Equites Dalmatae

== Culture ==
Archaeology and onomastics show that the Delmatae were akin to eastern Illyrians and northern Pannonii. The tribe was subject to Celtic influences. One of the Dalmatian tribes was called Baridustae that later was settled in Roman Dacia. Pliny the Elder also mentioned the Tariotes, and their territory Tariota, which was described as an ancient region. The Tariotes are considered part of the Delmatae.

The archeological remnants suggest their material culture was more primitive than those of the surrounding ancient tribes, especially in comparison with the oldest Liburnians. Only their production of weapons was rather advanced. Their elite had stone built houses only, but numerous Delmatic herdmen yet settled in natural caves, and a characteristic detail in their usual clothing was the fur cap.

Their nomadic society had a strong patriarchal structure, consisting chiefly of shepherds, warriors and their chieftains. Their main jobs had been the extensive cattle breeding, and the iterative plundering of other surrounding tribes and of coastal towns on the Adriatic.

=== Religion ===
The major collective deity of the Delmatic federation was their pastoral god Vidasus, similar to the Roman god Sylvanus. His divine wife was Thana, a Delmatic goddess mostly comparable with Roman Diana and Greek Artemis. Reliefs of these gods – often accompanied by nymphs – are partly conserved today in some cliffs in Dalmatia. Their 4th to 1st-century BC temple was unearthed in Imotski valley. Another important deity of the Delmatae was the war god Armatus, comparable with Roman Mars and Greek Ares. A malevolent deity was the celestial Dragon, devourer of the sun or moon in the eclipses.

A strong weapons cult was very specific for the patriarchal Delmatae, and in their masculine tombs different weapons are widely present (that is rare in neighbouring peoples e.g. Liburni, Iapydes, etc.). Their usual tombs were under the stone tumuli of kurgan type. After the classic Roman reports (Muzic 1998), nomadic Delmatae were extremely superstitious, and they had a primitive panic dread from all celestial phenomena: any view on the night stars was for them forbidden in the fear of a sure death, and in the case of solar or lunar eclipses they repeated tremendous collective howling because of the immediate world ending, made hysterical suicides etc.

== See also ==
- List of ancient Illyrian peoples and tribes

== Bibliography ==
- Catani, Lorenzo (2008). "Arheološko-povijesne bilješke o Castellum Tariona u rimsko doba" [Archaeological and historical notes on the Castellum Tariona in the Roman Era]. Vjesnik Za Arheologiju I Povijest Dalmatinsku (in Croatian and English). 101 (1). Split: 75–86.
- Dzino, Danijel (2010). Illyricum in Roman Politics, 229 BC–AD 68. Cambridge University Press. ISBN 978-0521194198.
- Duridanov, Ivan (2002). "Illyrisch". In Bister, Feliks J.; Gramshammer-Hohl, Dagmar; Heynoldt, Anke (eds.). Lexikon der Sprachen des europäischen Ostens (PDF). Wieser Verlag. ISBN 978-3-85129-510-8.
- Duridanov, Ivan (1975). Die Hydronymie des Vardarsystems als Geschichtsquelle (PDF). Böhlau Verlag. ISBN 3412839736.
- Miletić, Alen (2008a). "Saltus Tariotarum". Opvscvla Archaeologica (in Croatian and English). 32 (1): 7–20.
- Morić, Ivana (2012). "Običaji Delmata". Rostra. 5 (5). University of Zadar.
- Šašel Kos, Marjeta (1993). "Cadmus and Harmonia in Illyria". Arheološki Vestnik. 44: 113–136.
- Šašel Kos, Marjeta (2005). Appian and Illyricum. Narodni muzej Slovenije. ISBN 961616936X.
- Schütz, István (2006) [2002]. Fehér foltok a Balkánon (in Hungarian). Budapest: Balassi Kiadó. ISBN 9635064721.
- Šimunović, Petar (2013). "Predantički toponimi u današnjoj (i povijesnoj) Hrvatskoj [Pre-Roman placenames in present-day (and historical) Croatia]". Folia onomastica Croatica (22): 147–214.
- Wilkes, John (1962). "Studies in the roman province of Dalmatia" (PDF). Durham University.
- Wilkes, John (1996). The Illyrians. Wiley. ISBN 978-0631146711.
