= Marcus Claudius Marcellus (consul 166 BC) =

Roman consul

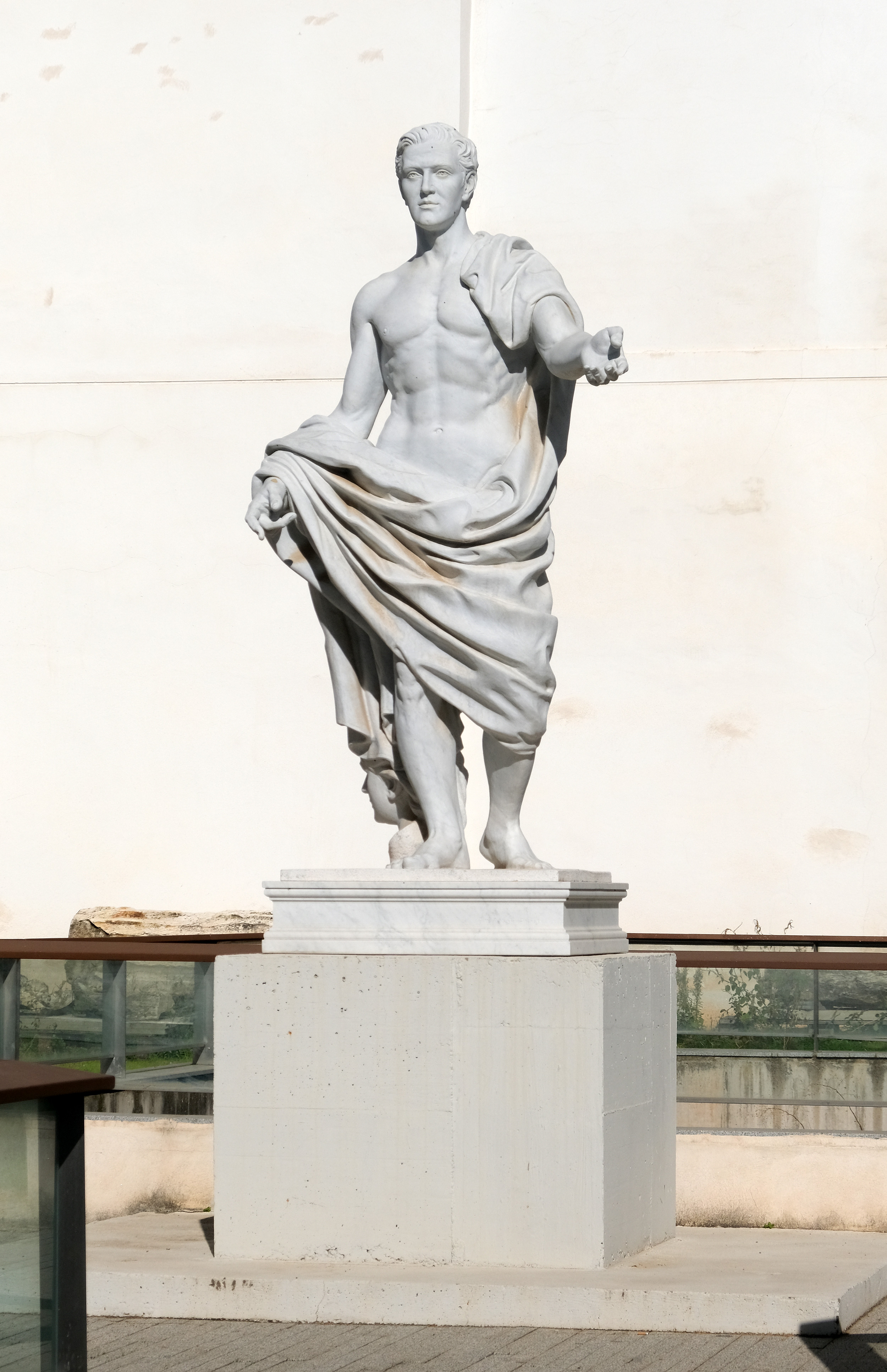
Statue of Claudio Marcelo in Córdoba (Spain)

Marcus Claudius Marcellus (died c. 148 BC) was Roman consul for the years 166 BC (together with Gaius Sulpicius Gallus), for 155 BC (with Publius Cornelius Scipio Nasica Corculum), and for 152 BC (with Lucius Valerius Flaccus).

== Family ==
He is thought to be the son of Marcus Claudius Marcellus, consul in 196 BC and censor in 189 BC, making him the grandson of the famous Marcus Claudius Marcellus, the five-times consul who successfully fought against Hannibal.

== Career ==
In 169 BC, he served as a praetor, being assigned to Hispania Citerior and Hispania Ulterior.

In 155 BC, he celebrated a triumph against the Apuani.

In 152 BC he assumed his third Consulship and replaced the previous Consul, Quintus Fulvius Nobilior, in his command against the Celtiberians in Spain. Having arrived with reinforcements, he negotiated the surrender of Ocilis and defeated the Nergobriges, before they and the other Celtiberian tribes of the Arevaci, the Belli, and the Titthi, sued for peace with Rome. Marcellus sent ambassadors back to the Senate in Rome, urging them to accept the peace proposals and end the long war in Spain. The Senate however, refused and began gathering a new army to be again sent to Spain the following year, appointing Lucius Licinius Lucullus, Consul-Elect for 151 BC, to replace Marcellus once his term as Consul expired. Upon learning of this, Marcellus nevertheless remained resolved to make peace in Spain and end the war before Lucullus' arrival. However, the Arevaci then attacked Nergobriga, the city of the Nergobriges, and broke the truce agreed with Marcellus. In retaliation, the Romans marched to besiege the Arevaci capital of Numantia; however, before the assault could begin, the Numantines re-opened negotiations for peace and, in a conference with Marcellus, the Numantine leader, Litenno, offered to make peace with Rome on behalf of the Arevaci, Belli and Titthi. Delighted, Marcellus accepted the offer and, the tribes having handed over the required hostages and money as guarantees that they would not break their promise, concluded the war in Spain before Lucullus and his army arrived.

During his consulship for either 169 or 152 BC he founded the city of Corduba (Córdoba, Spain).

Political offices
| Preceded by Quintus Aelius Paetus, and Marcus Iunius Pennus | Consul of the Roman Republic; 166 BC with Gaius Sulpicius Gallus | Succeeded by Titus Manlius Torquatus, and Gnaeus Octavius |
| Preceded by Lucius Cornelius Lentulus Lupus, and Gaius Marcius Figulus II | Consul of the Roman Republic; 155 BC with Publius Cornelius Scipio Nasica Corculum II | Succeeded by Quintus Opimius, and Lucius Postumius Albinus |
| Preceded by Quintus Fulvius Nobilior, and Titus Annius Luscus | Consul of the Roman Republic; 152 BC with Lucius Valerius Flaccus | Succeeded by Lucius Licinius Lucullus, and Aulus Postumius Albinus |
