= Gaius Marcius Figulus (consul 162 BC) =

Gaius Marcius Figulus was a politician of the Roman Republic who served as praetor in 169 BC, Roman consul in 162 BC, and again as consul in 156 BC. Upon being elected to the praetorship in 169 BC, Figulus received command of the Roman fleets by lot. Later that year, he transported the consul, Quintus Marcius Philippus, to Ambracia so that he could assume command of Roman forces fighting the Third Macedonian War. Figulus himself sailed on to Creusa, then crossed Boeotia by land in a single day to join the rest of the fleet at Chalcis. The only other mention Livy makes of Figulus is a reference to his having assigned part of the fleet to winter quarters at Sciathus, and the remainder at Oreum, in Euboea, which he judged the best location to maintain supply lines to the army in Macedon.

Figulus became consul for the first time in 162 BC, but he and his colleague Publius Cornelius Scipio Nasica Corculum abdicated when something went wrong with the auspices.

| Preceded by Tiberius Sempronius Gracchus and Marcus Juventius Thalna | Consul of the Roman Republic; 162 BC | Succeeded by Marcus Valerius Messalla and Gaius Fannius Strabo |

| Preceded by Sextus Julius Caesar and Lucius Aurelius Orestes | Consul of the Roman Republic; 156 BC | Succeeded by Publius Cornelius Scipio Nasica Corculum and Marcus Claudius Marcellus |
