= Publius Cornelius Lentulus (consul 162 BC) =

Roman consul 162 BC

Publius Cornelius Lentulus was a Roman politician in the second century BC.

In 172 BC, Lentulus was sent as an ambassador to Macedonia. In 171 BC, he was a military tribune and took part in the Third Macedonian War. In 169 BC, Lentulus, whilst serving as aedile, was the first to present African animals to the Roman Games. In 168 BC, after the victorious Battle of Pydna, Lentulus was sent with other ambassadors to capture Perseus, King of Macedonia. In 162 BC, he was made suffect consul together with Gnaeus Domitius Ahenobarbus, because the ordinary consuls, Publius Cornelius Scipio Nasica Corculum and Gaius Marcius Figulus, had abdicated from the consulship due to issues with the auspices. In 156 BC, Lentulus was sent as the head of an embassy to the Roman territories in the eastern Mediterranean. In 125 BC, he served as princeps senatus. In 122 BC, the already elderly man took part in the violence against Gaius Gracchus and was wounded.
