= Sulpicius Gallus (crater) =

Crater on the Moon

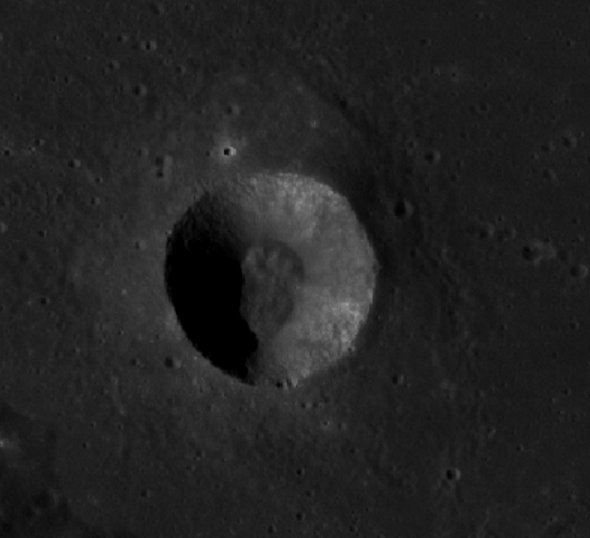
- LRO image
- Coordinates: 19.63°N 11.68°E
- Diameter: 12 km
- Depth: 2.17 km
- Colongitude: 349° at sunrise
- Formation: Copernican
- Eponym: Gaius Sulpicius Gallus

Sulpicius Gallus is a small, bowl-shaped lunar impact crater that lies near the southwestern edge of the Mare Serenitatis. The crater is named after the 2nd century BC Roman astronomer Gaius Sulpicius Gallus.

About 10 kilometers to the south and east is the Montes Haemus range that forms the edge of the Serenitatis basin. This crater has a relatively high albedo, with a sharp-edged rim that displays little appearance of wear. There is a small rise at the midpoint. Recent deposits of highland material have been observed within the crater interior. This material was observed to be orange by Apollo 17 astronauts during their LMP ascent.

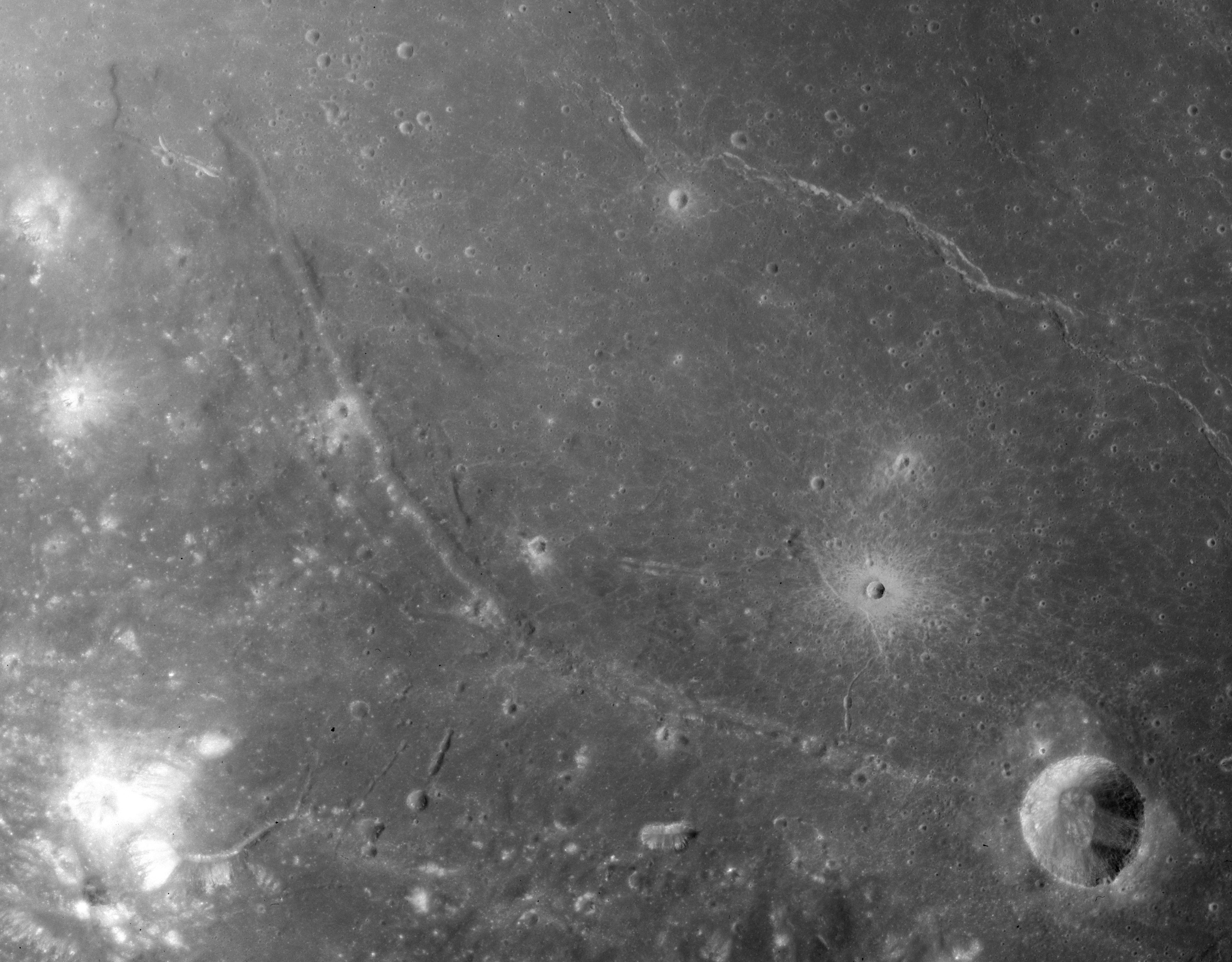
Rimae Sulpicius Gallus

To the northwest is a rille system designated the Rimae Sulpicius Gallus. These extend to the northwest for a distance of about 90 kilometers, curving and branching out to follow the edge of the mare.

== Satellite craters ==
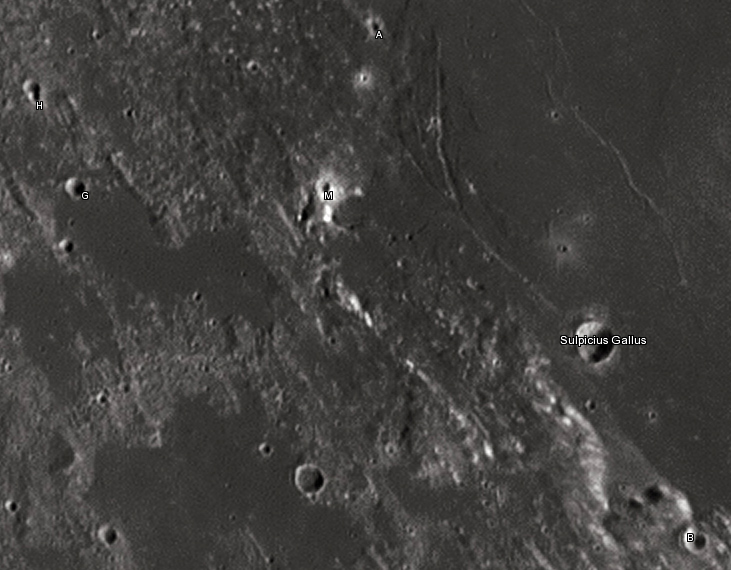
Satellite craters of Sulpicius Gallus taken from Earth in 2012 at the University of Hertfordshire's Bayfordbury Observatory with the telescopes Meade LX200 14" and Lumenera Skynyx 2-1

By convention these features are identified on lunar maps by placing the letter on the side of the crater midpoint that is closest to Sulpicius Gallus.

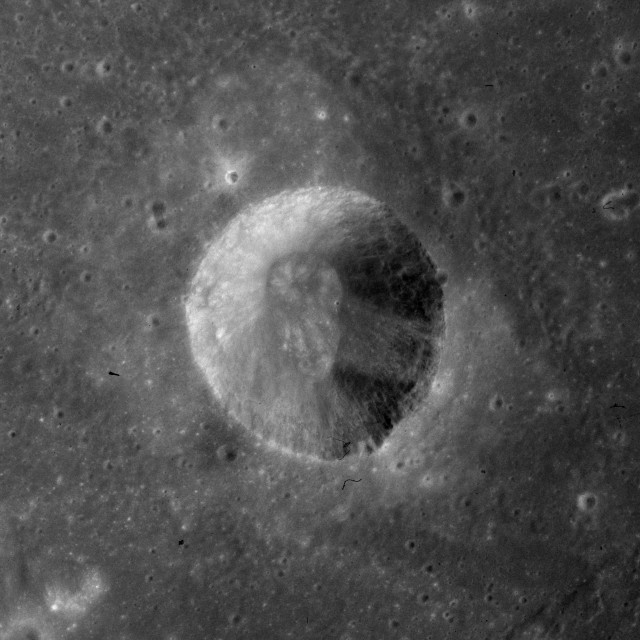
Apollo 15 Mapping camera image

Sulpicius Gallus	Latitude	Longitude	Diameter
A	22.1° N	8.9° E	4 km
B	18.0° N	13.0° E	7 km
G	19.8° N	6.3° E	6 km
H	20.6° N	5.7° E	5 km
M	20.4° N	8.7° E	5 km

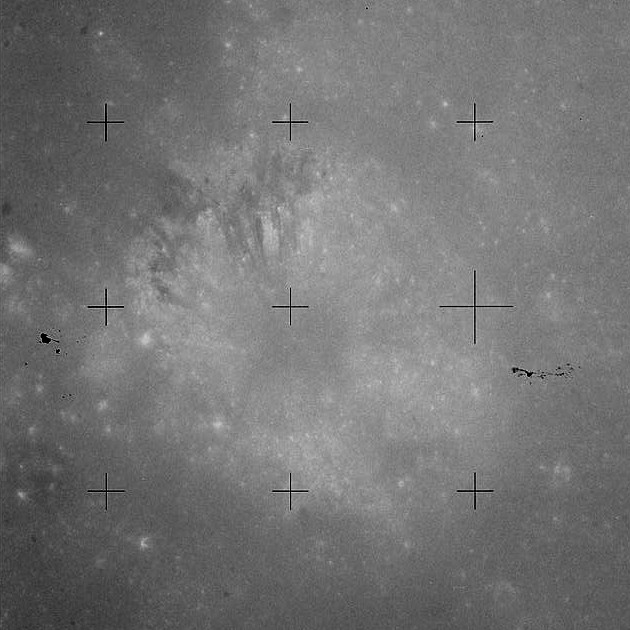
Sulpicius Gallus A
