= Figulus (disambiguation) =

Figulus can mean:

- Figulus, also known as the Bingham-Blossom House, a historic home in Palm Beach, Florida
- Figulus (beetle), a stag beetle genus
- Gaius Marcius Figulus, Roman consul in 162 and 156 BC
- Gaius Marcius Figulus, son of the above, an unsuccessful candidate for consulship
- Gaius Marcius Figulus, Roman consul in 64 BC, unknown relation to the above
- Nigidius Figulus (98-45 BC), a savant of ancient Rome
- Furnarius figulus, the wing-banded hornero, a Brazilian bird
