= Marcus Valerius Messalla (consul 161 BC) =

Marcus Valerius Messalla was a consul of the Roman Republic in 161 BC.

Nephew of Marcus Valerius Messalla (consul 226 BC), his consulate was remarkable chiefly for a decree of the senate prohibiting the residence of Greek rhetoricians at Rome. The Phormion and Eunuch of Terence were first acted in this year. Messalla became himself censor in 154 BC.

Political offices
Preceded by Publius Cornelius Lentulus (Suffect.) and Gnaeus Domitius Ahenobarbus (Suffect.)	Suffect consul of the Roman Republic with Gaius Fannius Strabo; 161 BC	Succeeded by Lucius Anicius Gallus and Marcus Cornelius Cethegus
