= Gaius Sulpicius Gallus =

Roman consul (166 BC)

Gaius Sulpicius Gallus or Galus (/ˈɡeɪəs sʌlˈpɪʃəs ˈɡæləs/) was a general, statesman and orator of the Roman Republic. In 169 BC, he served as praetor urbanus. Under Lucius Aemilius Paulus, his intimate friend, he commanded the 2nd legion in the campaign against Perseus, king of Macedonia, and gained great reputation for having predicted a lunar eclipse on the night before the Battle of Pydna (168 BC). On his return from Macedonia he was elected consul (166 BC), and in the same year reduced the Ligurians to submission. In 164 BC he was sent as ambassador to Greece and Asia, where he held a meeting at Sardis to investigate the charges brought against Eumenes II of Pergamon by the representatives of various cities of Asia Minor. Gallus was a man of great learning, an excellent Greek scholar, and in his later years devoted himself to the study of astronomy, on which subject he is quoted as an authority by Pliny. He was able to predict a lunar eclipse in the year 168 BC, and was regarded by his contemporaries as a man of great learning on this account. The lunar crater Sulpicius Gallus is named after him. See Livy xliv. 37, Epit. 46; Polybius xxxi. 9, 10; Cicero, Brutus, 20, De officiis, i. 6, De senectute, 14; Pliny, Nat. Hist. ii. 9.

== Notes ==
Political offices
Preceded by Quintus Aelius Paetus, and Marcus Iunius Pennus	Consul of the Roman Republic; 166 BC with Marcus Claudius Marcellus	Succeeded by Manlius Torquatus, and Gnaeus Octavius
