= Titus Annius Luscus =

Titus Annius Luscus was the name of several ancient Roman men of the plebeian gens Annia, including:

- Titus Annius Luscus, one of three envoys sent with Roman demands to Perseus of Macedon in 172 BC
- Titus Annius Luscus, consul in 153 BC, and one of the enemies of Tiberius Gracchus
- Titus Annius Rufus, perhaps also with the additional cognomen Luscus, consul in 128 BC
