= Velius Longus =

Roman grammarian

Velius Longus (fl. 2nd century AD), Latin grammarian during the reign of Trajan (or Hadrian), author of an extant treatise on orthography (Heinrich Keil, Grammatici Latini, vii). He is mentioned by Macrobius (Saturnalia, iii.6.6) and Servius (Comm. on Aen. x.245) as a commentator on Virgil. He is also mentioned by Aulus Gellius (Noctes Atticae, 18.9.4).
