= Lucius Anicius Gallus =

Roman senator and general

Lucius Anicius Gallus (fl. 2nd century BC) was a Roman senator and military commander. He led the conquest of Illyria during the Third Macedonian War (171–168 BC).

== Biography ==
Lucius Anicius Gallus was elected praetor in 168 BC, replacing the propraetor Appius Claudius Caecus as the military leader of the Roman conquest of Illyria. He took control of the region in twenty or thirty days following the defeat of Perseus of Macedon, the ally of the Illyrian king Gentius. Anicius Gallus brought back the latter and his children to Rome as prisoners, and was designated propraetor of Illyria the same year. At the end of 167, he celebrated his victory at the festival of Quirinalia in a ridiculous manner according to Polybius, due to his lack of understanding for Greek art, having constructed an enormous stage in the circus where he invited the most celebrated scenic artists from Greece to play. In the same year, he kept his function as a praetor and subdued the rebellious cities in the Greek state of Epirus. In 160, he became Consul and was among the ten legates sent by the Roman Senate to Anatolia in 154 to force Prusias II, the Greek king of Bithynia, to end the ongoing war with the king of Pergamon, Attalus II.
