= Renaissance and Reformation =

- Discipline: History
- Language: English
- Edited by: William Bowen

Publication details
- History: 1964–present
- Frequency: Quarterly
- Open access: Delayed (2 years)

Standard abbreviations
- ISO 4: Renaiss. Reform.

Indexing
- ISSN: 0034-429X (print); 2293-7374 (web)
- LCCN: 85650146
- JSTOR: 0034429X
- OCLC no.: 01642154

Links
- Journal homepage

Renaissance and Reformation is a multidisciplinary journal devoted to the early modern period). It was founded by Natalie Zemon Davis and others in 1964, with Davis holding the editorship until 1968. It is sponsored by the Centre for Reformation and Renaissance Studies at Victoria University in the University of Toronto, the Toronto Renaissance Colloquium, the Pacific Northwest Renaissance Society, and the Canadian Society for Renaissance Studies.

The journal is published quarterly. Each issue contains four to five scholarly articles as well as book reviews in English and French.

Editors have included John McClelland (1969–70), Julius Molinaro (1970-76), Richard van Fossen (1976–1985), Kenneth R. Bartlett (1985–90), François Paré (1990–2000), and Alan Shepard (2003-2009). As of 2025, the editor is William Bowen, who took on the post in 2009.

== Indexing ==
The journal is indexed in:

- Arts and Humanities Citation Index
- Scopus
- IBZ Online
- EBSCO databases
- Modern Language Association Database
