= Gaius Fannius Strabo =

Roman consul 161 BC

Gaius Fannius Strabo was a Roman politician in the second century BC.

== Family ==
He was a member of the gens Fannia. His father and grandfather both bore the praenomen Gaius. His nephew was Gaius Fannius, consul in 122 BC.

== Career ==
Strabo served as praetor in 164 BC. In 161 BC, he became consul together with Marcus Valerius Messalla as his colleague. In that year, laws were passed to restrict luxury and the influence of Hellenic culture. The consuls prohibited Greek philosophers and rhetoricians from staying in Rome. He also introduced the Lex Fannia, a law that restricted dinner expenses, the types of food that were served, and the number of guests. These laws were inspired and encouraged by the conservative politician, Cato the Elder.

In 158 BC, Strabo was sent on a diplomatic mission to Illyria in response to Dalmatian piracy. However, the Dalmatians were hostile, and Strabo was forced to flee to safety.

In 154 BC, Strabo served in one of three diplomatic missions to Asia Minor, in an attempt to end the war between King Prusias II of Bithynia and Attalus II of Pergamon, failing too, in this undertaking.
