= List of state leaders in the 2nd century BC =

State leaders in the 3rd century BC – State leaders in the 1st century BC – State leaders by year

This is a list of state leaders in the 2nd century BC (200–101 BC).

== Africa ==
=== Africa: Northcentral ===
Libya

- Cyrene (complete list) –

- Ptolemy Apion, King (c.147–96 BC)

=== Africa: Northeast ===
Egypt

- Ptolemaic Kingdom of Egypt (complete list) –

- Ptolemy V Epiphanes, Pharaoh (204–181 BC)
- Cleopatra I Syra, Regent (187–176 BC)
- Ptolemy VI Philometor, Pharaoh (181–164, 163–145 BC)
- Ptolemy VII Neos Philopator, Pharaoh (169–164, 144–132/131, 126–116 BC)
- Cleopatra II, Queen (175–164 BC, 163–127, 124–116 BC)
- Ptolemy VIII Physcon, Pharaoh (169–164 BC, 144–132/131 BC, 126–116 BC)
- Cleopatra III, Queen (142–131 BC, 127–101 BC)
- Ptolemy IX Lathyros, Pharaoh (116–110 BC, 110–109 BC, 88–81 BC)
- Ptolemy X Alexander I, Pharaoh (110–109 BC, 107–88 BC)
- Berenice III, Pharaoh (101–88 BC, 81–80 BC)

Nubia

- Kingdom of Kush (complete list) –

- Arqamani, Qore (3rd–2nd century BC)
- Adikhalamani, Qore (early 2nd century BC)
- Shanakdakhete, Kandake (late 2nd century BC)
- Tanyidamani, Qore (2nd–1st century BC)

=== Africa: Northwest ===
Algeria

- Numidia (complete list) –

- Vermina, King (202 BC–?)
- Archobarzane, King (?)
- Massinissa, King (202–148 BC)
- Micipsa, King (148–118 BC)
- Adherbal, King (118–117, 117–112 BC)
- Hiempsal I, King (117 BC)
- Jugurtha, King (117–105 BC)
- Gauda, King (105–88 BC)

Morocco

- Mauretania (complete list) –

- Bocchus I, King (c.110–c.80s BC)

== Asia ==
=== Asia: East ===
China

- Western Han, China (complete list) –

- Gaozu, Emperor (202–195 BC)
- Hui, Emperor (195–188 BC)
- Qianshao, Emperor (188–184 BC)
- Houshao, Emperor (184–180 BC)
- Wen, Emperor (180–157 BC)
- Jing, Emperor (157–141 BC)
- Wu, Emperor (141–87 BC)

Korea

- Gojoseon (complete list) –
  - Chun, King (210–194 BC)
  - Wiman, King (194 BC–?)
  - Unknown son of Wiman, King (?)
  - Ugŏ, King (?–108 BC)
- Mahan confederacy –
  - Chun, (194 BC – ?)

=== Asia: Southeast ===
Vietnam

- Triệu dynasty (complete list) –

- Zhao Tuo, King (203–137 BC)
- Zhao Mo, King (137–122 BC)
- Zhao Yingqi, King (122–115 BC)
- Zhao Xing, King (115–112 BC)
- Zhao Jiande, King (112–111 BC)

=== Asia: South ===
India

- Maurya Empire (complete list) –

- Devavarman, King (202–195 BC)
- Shatadhanvan, King (195–187 BC)
- Brihadratha, King (187–180 BC)

- Satavahana dynasty (Purana-based chronology) –

- Krishna, King (205–187 BC)
- Satakarni I, King (187–177 BC)
- Purnotsanga, King (177–159 BC)
- Skandhastambhi, King (159–141 BC)
- Satakarni II, King (141–85 BC)

- Shunga Empire (complete list) –

- Pushyamitra Shunga, Emperor (185–149 BC)
- Agnimitra, Emperor (149–141 BC)
- Vasujyeshtha, Emperor (141–131 BC)
- Vasumitra, Emperor (131–124 BC)
- Bhagabhadra, Emperor (c.110 BC)

Sri Lanka

- Anuradhapura Kingdom (complete list) –

- Ellalan, King (205–161 BC)
- Dutugamunu, King (161–137 BC)
- Saddha Tissa, King (137–119 BC)
- Thulatthana, King (119–119 BC)
- Lanja Tissa, King (119–109 BC)
- Khallata Naga, King (109–104 BC)
- Valagamba, King (104–103, c.89–77 BC)
- Pulahatta, King (103–100 BC)

=== Asia: West ===
- Kingdom of Bithynia (complete list) –

- Prusias I Cholus, King (228–182 BC)
- Prusias II Cynegus, King (182–149 BC)
- Nicomedes II Epiphanes, King (149–127 BC)
- Nicomedes III Euergetes, King (127–94 BC)

- Bosporan Kingdom (complete list) –

- Hygiainon, King (c.220–c.200 BC)
- Spartacus V, King (c.200–c.180 BC)
- Pairisades III, King (c.180–c.150 BC)
- Pairisades IV, King (c.150–c.125 BC)
- Pairisades V, King (c.125–108 BC)

- Cappadocia (complete list) –

- Ariarathes IV, King (220–163 BC)
- Ariarathes V, King (163–130 BC)
- Orophernes, King (157 BC)
- Ariarathes VI, King (130–116 BC)
- Ariarathes VII, King (116–101 BC)
- Ariarathes VIII, client King under Rome (101–96 BC)

- Characene (complete list) –

- Hyspaosines, King (c.127–124 BC)
- Apodakos, King (c.110/09–104/03 BC)

- Colchis (complete list) –

- Saulaces, King (2nd century BC)

- Commagene (complete list) –

- Ptolemaeus, King (163–130 BC)
- Sames II, King (130–109 BC)
- Mithridates I, King (109–70 BC)

- Elymais (complete list) –

- Kamnaskires I Megas Soter, client King under Parthia (c.147–c.145 BC)
- Kamnaskires II Nikephoros, client King under Parthia (c.145–c.139 BC)
- Okkonapses, client King under Parthia (c.139/8 BC)
- Tigraios, client King under Parthia (c.138/7–c.133/2 BC)
- Darius, client King under Parthia (before c.129 BC)

- Greco-Bactrian Kingdom (list) –

- Euthydemus I, King (c.230–c.200 BC)
- Demetrius I, King (c. 200–c. 180 BC)
- Euthydemus II, King (c.180 BCE)
- Antimachus I, King (c.185–170 BC)
- Pantaleon, King (190s or 180s BC)
- Agathocles, King (c.190–180 BC)
- Demetrius II, King (155–150 BC)
- Eucratides I, King (170–c.145 BC)
- Plato, co-King (c.166 BC)
- Eucratides II, King (145–140 BC)
- Heliocles I, King (c.145–130 BC)

- Indo-Greek Kingdom (complete list) –

- Demetrius I, Greco-Bactrian King and Indo-Greek King (c.205–171 BC)
- Pantaleon, King of Arachosia and Gandhara (c.190–185 BC)
- Agathocles, King of Paropamisade (c.190–180 BC)
- Antimachus I, Greco-Bactrian King (185–170 BC)
- Apollodotus I, King of Paropamisade, Arachosia, Gandhara, and Punjab (c.180–160 BC)
- Antimachus II, King of Paropamisadae, Arachosia, Gandhara, and Punjab (c.172–167 BC)
- Demetrius II, King of Bactria (c.155–150 BC)
- Menander I, King of Paropamisadae, Arachosia, Gandhara, and Punjab (155/150–130 BC)
- Zoilos I, King of Paropamisade and Arachosia (c.130–120 BC)
- Agathokleia, Regent, Queen of Gandhara and Punjab (c.130–125 BC)
- Lysias, King of Paropamisade and Arachosia (120–110 BC)
- Strato I, King of Gandhara and Punjab (125–110 BC)
- Antialcidas, King of Paropamisade, Arachosia, and Gandhara (115–95 BC)
- Heliokles II, King of Gandhara and Punjab (110–100 BC)
- Polyxenios, King of Paropamisade and Arachosia (c.100 BC)
- Demetrius III, King of Gandhara and Punjab (c.100 BC)
- Philoxenus, King of Paropamisade, Arachosia, Gandhara, and Punjab (100–95 BC)

- Judea: Hasmonean dynasty (complete list) –

- Judas Maccabeus, Leader of the Maccabees (167–160 BC)
- Jonathan Apphus

- Leader of the Maccabees (160–152 BC)
- High Priest (152–143 BC)

- Simon Thassi, High Priest (142–135 BC) and Prince (141–135 BC)
- John Hyrcanus, High Priest and Prince (134–104 BC)
- Aristobulus I, King and High Priest (104–103 BC)
- Alexander Jannaeus, King and High Priest (103–76 BC)

- Nabataea (complete list) –

- Aretas I, King (c.169 BC)
- Aretas II, King (120/110–96 BC)

- Osroene (complete list) –

- Aryu, King (132–127 BC)
- Abdu, King (127–120 BC)
- Fradhasht, King (120–115 BC)
- Bakru I, King (115–112 BC)
- Bakru II, King (112–94 BC)

- Parthian Empire (complete list) –

- Arsaces II, King (211–191 BC)
- Phriapatius, King (191–176 BC)
- Phraates I, King (176–171 BC)
- Mithridates I, Great King, Shah (171–138 BC)
- Phraates II, Great King, Shah (138–127 BC)
- Artabanus II, Great King, Shah (127–124 BC)
- Mithridates II, Great King, Shah (124–88 BC)

- Attalid kingdom of Pergamon (complete list) –

- Attalus I Soter (241–197 BC)
- Eumenes II, King (197–159 BC)
- Attalus II Philadelphus, King (160–138 BC)
- Attalus III, King (138–133 BC)

- Pontus (complete list) –

- Mithridates III, King (c.210–c.190 BC)
- Pharnaces I, King (c.190–c.155 BC)
- Mithridates IV Philopator Philadephos, King (c.155–c.150 BC)
- Mithridates V Euergetes, King (c.150–120 BC)
- Mithridates VI, King (120–63 BC)

- Seleucid Empire (complete list) –

- Antiochus III, the Great, King (223–187 BC)
- Seleucus IV Philopator, King (187–175 BC)
- Antiochus IV Epiphanes, King (175–163 BC)
- Antiochus V Eupator, King (163–161 BC)
- Demetrius I Soter, King (161–150 BC)
- Alexander I Balas, King (150–145 BC)
- Antiochus VI Dionysus, King (145–142 BC)
- Demetrius II Nicator, King (145–138, 129–126 BC)
- Diodotus Tryphon, King (142–138 BC)
- Antiochus VII Sidetes, King (138–129 BC)
- Alexander II Zabinas, King (129–123 BC)
- Seleucus V Philometor, King (126/125 BC)
- Cleopatra Thea, Coregent (126–121 BC)
- Antiochus VIII Grypus, King (125–96 BC)
- Antiochus IX Cyzicenus, King (114–96 BC)

== Europe ==
=== Europe: Balkans ===
- Macedonia: Antigonid dynasty (complete list) –

- Philip V, King (221–179 BC)
- Perseus, King (179–168 BC)
- Andriscus/ Pseudo-Philip VI, King (149–148 BC)

- Odrysian kingdom of Thrace (complete list) –

- Seuthes IV, King (215–190 BC)
- Pleuratus I, King (213–208 BC)
- Amatokos III, King (184 BC)
- Cotys IV, King (171–167 BC)
- Teres III, King (c.149 BC)
- Beithys, King (140–120 BC)
- Cotys V, King (120–? BC)

=== Europe: East ===
- Dacia (complete list) –

- Rubobostes, King (2nd century BC)
- Oroles, King (2nd century BC)

=== Europe: South ===
- Roman Republic (complete list) –

- 200

- Publius Sulpicius Galba Maximus, Consul
- Gaius Aurelius Cotta, Consul

- 199

- Lucius Cornelius Lentulus, Consul
- Publius Villius Tappulus, Consul

- 198

- Sextus Aelius Paetus Catus, Consul
- Titus Quinctius Flamininus, Consul

- 197

- Gaius Cornelius Cethegus, Consul
- Quintus Minucius Rufus, Consul

- 196

- Lucius Furius Purpureo, Consul
- Marcus Claudius Marcellus, Consul

- 195

- Lucius Valerius Flaccus, Consul
- Cato the Elder, Consul

- 194

- Scipio Africanus, Consul
- Tiberius Sempronius Longus, Consul

- 193

- Lucius Cornelius Merula, Consul
- Quintus Minucius Thermus, Consul

- 192

- Lucius Quinctius Flamininus, Consul
- Gnaeus Domitius Ahenobarbus, Consul

- 191

- Publius Cornelius Scipio Nasica, Consul
- Manius Acilius Glabrio, Consul

- 190

- Scipio Asiaticus, Consul
- Gaius Laelius, Consul

- 189

- Marcus Fulvius Nobilior, Consul
- Gnaeus Manlius Vulso, Consul

- 188

- Marcus Valerius Messalla, Consul
- Gaius Livius Salinator, Consul

- 187

- Marcus Aemilius Lepidus, Consul
- Gaius Flaminius, Consul

- 186

- Spurius Postumius Albinus, Consul
- Quintus Marcius Philippus, Consul

- 185

- Appius Claudius Pulcher, Consul
- Marcus Sempronius Tuditanus, Consul

- 184

- Publius Claudius Pulcher, Consul
- Lucius Porcius Licinus, Consul

- 183

- Marcus Claudius Marcellus, Consul
- Quintus Fabius Labeo, Consul

- 182

- Cnaeus Baebius Tamphilus, Consul
- Lucius Aemilius Paullus Macedonicus, Consul

- 181

- Publius Cornelius Cethegus, Consul
- Marcus Baebius Tamphilus, Consul

- 180

- Aulus Postumius Albinus Luscus, Consul
- Caius Calpurnius Piso, Consul
- Quintus Fulvius Flaccus, Consul suffectus

- 179

- Quintus Fulvius Flaccus, Consul
- Lucius Manlius Acidinus Fulvianus, Consul

- 178

- Marcus Iunius Brutus, Consul
- Aulus Manlius Vulso, Consul

- 177

- Gaius Claudius Pulcher, Consul
- Tiberius Sempronius Gracchus, Consul

- 176

- Cnaeus Cornelius Scipio Hispallus, Consul
- Quintus Petillius Spurinus, Consul
- Caius Valerius Laevinus, Consul suffectus

- 175

- Publius Mucius Scaevola, Consul
- Marcus Aemilius Lepidus, Consul

- 174

- Spurius Postumius Albinus Paullulus, Consul
- Quintus Mucius Scaevola, Consul

- 173

- Lucius Postumius Albinus, Consul
- Marcus Popillius Laenas, Consul

- 172

- Gaius Popillius Laenas, Consul
- Publius Aelius Ligus, Consul

- 171

- Publius Licinius Crassus, Consul
- Gaius Cassius Longinus, Consul

- 170

- Aulus Hostilius Mancinus, Consul
- Aulus Atilius Serranus, Consul

- 169

- Quintus Marcius Philippus, Consul
- Gnaeus Servilius Caepio, Consul

- 168

- Aemilius Paullus Macedonius, Consul
- Caius Licinius Crassus, Consul

- 167

- Quintus Aelius Paetus, Consul
- Marcus Iunius Pennus, Consul

- 166

- Marcus Claudius Marcellus, Consul
- Gaius Sulpicius Gallus, Consul

- 165

- Titus Manlius Torquatus, Consul
- Cnaeus Octavius, Consul

- 164

- Aulus Manlius Torquatus, Consul
- Quintus Cassius Longinus, Consul

- 163

- Tiberius Sempronius Gracchus, Consul
- Manius Iuventius Thalna, Consul

- 162

- Publius Cornelius Scipio Nasica Corculum, Consul
- Caius Marcius Figulus, Consul
- Publius Cornelius Lentulus, Consul suffectus
- Gnaeus Domitius Ahenobarbus, Consul suffectus

- 161

- Marcus Valerius Messalla, Consul
- Caius Fannius Strabo, Consul

- 160

- Lucius Anicius Gallus, Consul
- Marcus Cornelius Cethegus, Consul

- 159

- Cnaeus Cornelius Dolabella, Consul
- Marcus Fulvius Nobilior, Consul

- 158

- Marcus Aemilius Lepidus, Consul
- Gaius Popillius Laenas, Consul

- 157

- Sextus Julius Caesar, Consul
- Lucius Aurelius Orestes, Consul

- 156

- Lucius Cornelius Lentulus Lupus, Consul
- Caius Marcius Figulus, Consul

- 155

- Publius Cornelius Scipio Nasica Corculum, Consul
- Marcus Claudius Marcellus, Consul

- 154

- Quintus Opimius, Consul
- Lucius Postumius Albinus, Consul
- Manius Acilius Glabrio, Consul suffectus

- 153

- Quintus Fulvius Nobilior, Consul
- Titus Annius Luscus, Consul

- 152

- Marcus Claudius Marcellus, Consul
- Lucius Valerius Flaccus, Consul

- 151

- Lucius Licinius Lucullus, Consul
- Aulus Postumius Albinus, Consul

- 150

- Titus Quinctius Flamininus, Consul
- Manius Acilius Balbus, Consul

- 149

- Lucius Marcius Censorinus, Consul
- Manius Manilius, Consul

- 148

- Spurius Postumius Albinus Magnus, Consul
- Lucius Calpurnius Piso Caesoninus, Consul

- 147

- Scipio Aemilianus Africanus, Consul
- Gaius Livius Drusus, Consul

- 146

- Gnaeus Cornelius Lentulus, Consul
- Lucius Mummius Achaicus, Consul

- 145

- Quintus Fabius Maximus Aemilianus, Consul
- Lucius Hostilius Mancinus, Consul

- 144

- Servius Sulpicius Galba, Consul
- Lucius Aurelius Cotta, Consul

- 143

- Appius Claudius Pulcher, Consul
- Quintus Caecilius Metellus Macedonicus, Consul

- 142

- Lucius Caecilius Metellus Calvus, Consul
- Quintus Fabius Maximus Servilianus, Consul

- 141

- Cnaeus Servilius Caepio, Consul
- Quintus Pompeius, Consul

- 140

- Gaius Laelius Sapiens, Consul
- Quintus Servilius Caepio, Consul

- 139

- Gnaeus Calpurnius Piso, Consul
- Marcus Popillius Laenas, Consul

- 138

- Publius Cornelius Scipio Nasica Serapio, Consul
- Decimus Junius Brutus Callaicus, Consul

- 137

- Marcus Aemilius Lepidus Porcina, Consul
- Gaius Hostilius Mancinus, Consul

- 136

- Lucius Furius Philus, Consul
- Sextus Atilius Serranus, Consul

- 135

- Servius Fulvius Flaccus, Consul
- Quintus Calpurnius Piso, Consul

- 134

- Scipio Aemilianus, Consul
- Caius Fulvius Flaccus, Consul

- 133

- Publius Mucius Scaevola, Consul
- Lucius Calpurnius Piso Frugi, Consul

- 132

- Publius Popillius Laenas, Consul
- Publius Rupilius, Consul

- 131

- Publius Licinius Crassus Dives Mucianus, Consul
- Lucius Valerius Flaccus, Consul

- 130

- Lucius Cornelius Lentulus, Consul
- Marcus Perperna, Consul
- Appius Claudius Pulcher, Consul suffectus

- 129

- Gaius Sempronius Tuditanus, Consul
- Manius Aquillius, Consul

- 128

- Gnaeus Octavius, Consul
- Titus Annius Rufus, Consul

- 127

- Lucius Cassius Longinus Ravilla, Consul
- Lucius Cornelius Cinna, Consul

- 126

- Marcus Aemilius Lepidus, Consul
- Lucius Aurelius Orestes, Consul

- 125

- Marcus Plautius Hypsaeus, Consul
- Marcus Fulvius Flaccus, Consul

- 124

- Caius Cassius Longinus, Consul
- Gaius Sextius Calvinus, Consul

- 123

- Quintus Caecilius Metellus Balearicus, Consul
- Titus Quinctius Flamininus, Consul

- 122

- Gnaeus Domitius Ahenobarbus, Consul
- Gaius Fannius, Consul

- 121

- Lucius Opimius, Consul
- Quintus Fabius Maximus Allobrogicus, Consul

- 120

- Publius Manilius, Consul
- Gaius Papirius Carbo, Consul

- 119

- Lucius Caecilius Metellus Dalmaticus, Consul
- Lucius Aurelius Cotta, Consul

- 118

- Marcus Porcius Cato, Consul
- Quintus Marcius Rex, Consul

- 117

- Lucius Caecilius Metellus Diadematus, Consul
- Quintus Mucius Scaevola Augur, Consul

- 116

- Gaius Licinius Geta, Consul
- Quintus Fabius Maximus Eburnus, Consul

- 115

- Marcus Aemilius Scaurus, Consul
- Marcus Caecilius Metellus, Consul

- 114

- Manius Acilius Balbus, Consul
- Gaius Porcius Cato, Consul

- 113

- Gaius Caecilius Metellus Caprarius, Consul
- Gnaeus Papirius Carbo, Consul

- 112

- Marcus Livius Drusus, Consul
- Lucius Calpurnius Piso Caesoninus, Consul

- 111

- Publius Cornelius Scipio Nasica, Consul
- Lucius Calpurnius Bestia, Consul

- 110

- Marcus Minucius Rufus, Consul
- Spurius Postumius Albinus, Consul

- 109

- Quintus Caecilius Metellus Numidicus, Consul
- Marcus Junius Silanus, Consul

- 108

- Servius Sulpicius Galba, Consul
- Marcus Aurelius Scaurus, Consul

- 107

- Lucius Cassius Longinus, Consul
- Gaius Marius, Consul

- 106

- Quintus Servilius Caepio, Consul
- Gaius Atilius Serranus, Consul

- 105

- Publius Rutilius Rufus, Consul
- Gnaeus Mallius Maximus, Consul

- 104

- Gaius Marius, Consul
- Gaius Flavius Fimbria, Consul

- 103

- Gaius Marius, Consul
- Lucius Aurelius Orestes, Consul

- 102

- Gaius Marius, Consul
- Quintus Lutatius Catulus, Consul

- 101

- Gaius Marius, Consul
- Manius Aquillius, Consul

=== Eurasia: Caucasus ===
- Armenia (complete list) –

- Orontes IV, King (c.212–200 BC)
- Artaxias I, King (190/189–160/159 BC)
- Tigranes I, King (159–123 BC)
- Artavasdes I, King (123–95 BC)

- Iberia (Kartli) (complete list) –

- Sauromaces I, King (234–159 BC)
- Mirian I, King (159–109 BC)
- Pharnajom, King (109–90 BC)
