= Spurius Postumius =

Spurius Postumius can refer to a number of different people from Roman history:

- Spurius Postumius Albus Regillensis (consul 466 BC)
- Spurius Postumius Albus Regillensis (consul 432 BC)
- Spurius Postumius Albinus Regillensis, consular tribune in 394 BC
- Spurius Postumius Albinus Caudinus, consul in 334 and 321 BC, general in the Second Samnite War
- Spurius Postumius Albinus (consul 186 BC)
- Spurius Postumius Albinus Paullulus, consul in 174 BC
- Spurius Postumius Albinus Magnus, consul 148 BC
- Spurius Postumius Albinus (consul 110 BC)
