= Lucius Postumius Albinus =

Lucius Postumius Albinus may refer to:

- Lucius Postumius Albinus (consul 234 BC)
- Lucius Postumius Albinus (consul 173 BC)
- Lucius Postumius Albinus (consul 154 BC)
