= Gaius Furius Chresimus =

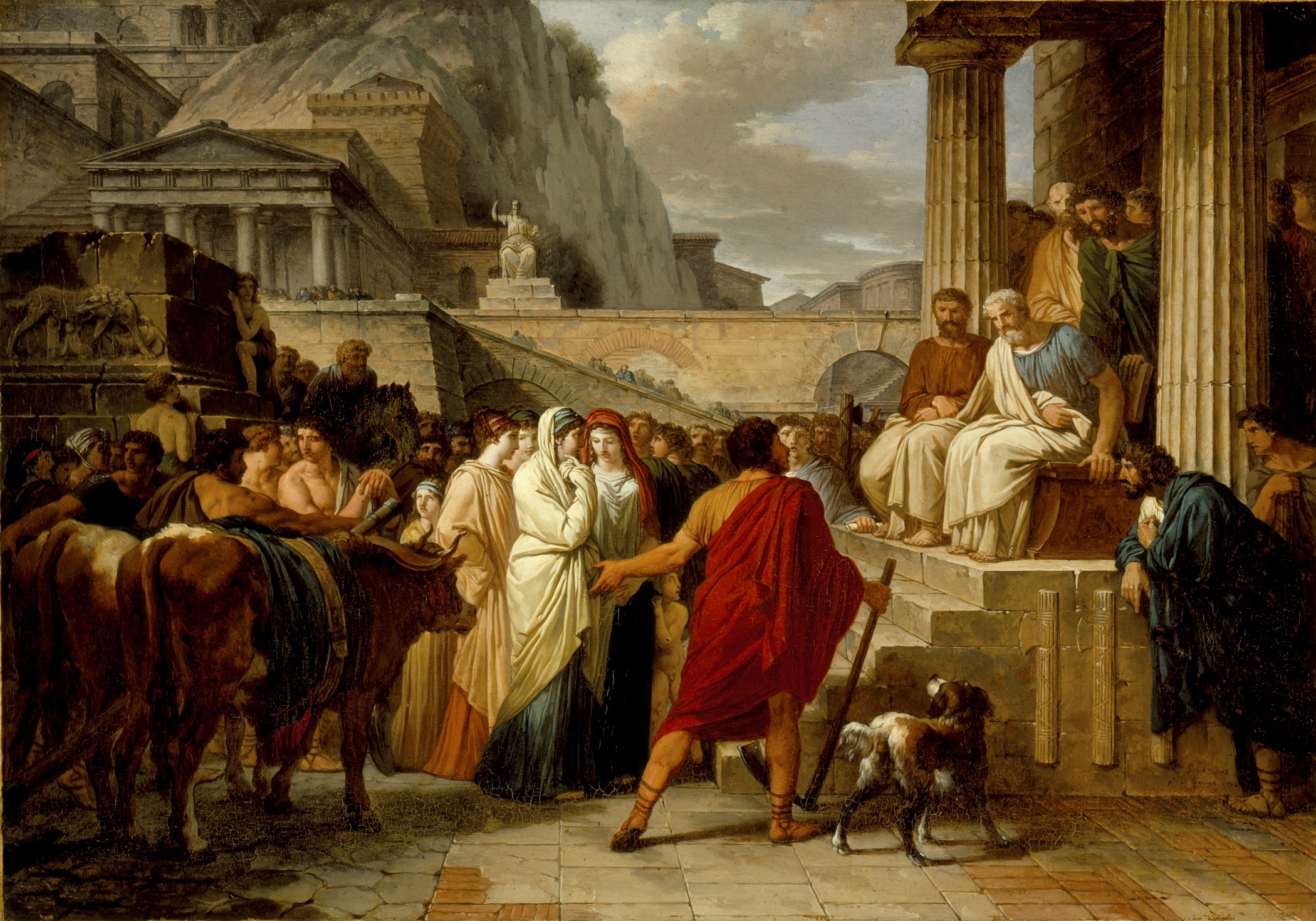
Caius Furius Cressinus Accused of Sorcery, Jean-Pierre Saint-Ours, 1792, 19 x 27 in. (48.26 x 68.58 cm), Los Angeles County Museum of Art

Gaius Furius Chresimus, or Cresimus, or Cressinus, was a 2nd-century BC Greek farmer and freedman in the Roman Republic mentioned in a fragment of the lost history of Lucius Calpurnius Piso Frugi, preserved in Pliny's Natural History.

Piso tells that Furius Chresimus was acquitted of accusations of witchcraft during the aedileship of Spurius Postumius Albinus, dated 191 BC. The trial took place in a period of reaction against the growing influence of Hellenism at Rome, notably led by Albinus. Both Piso and Pliny told the story of the trial for its moralizing aspect.

Chresimus was the subject of number of history paintings in France at the end of the 18th century, when Neoclassicism became fashionable, and agricultural reform had become the subject of much political debate.

== Life ==
The only mention of Chresimus in ancient sources comes from a fragment of Lucius Calpurnius Piso Frugi, who was consul in 133 BC, and notably an enemy of Tiberius Gracchus. Piso probably wrote a history called Annales in at least seven books, which he started after his censorship in 120.

The consensus among historians is to identify the Spurius Postumius Albinus mentioned in the fragment with the consul of 186 BC, who was likely aedile in 191 BC, the most probable date of Chresimus' trial. Piso's source for the trial might have been Aulus Postumius Albinus, consul in 151 BC, and author of a Roman history in Greek. However, Gary Forsythe pointed out that Albinus' history was principally focused to the Greek world and urban matters and would not have dealt with Chresimus' story. Instead, he suggests that Piso could have found about Chresimus from oral tradition among his family, because the Postumii Albini and the Calpurnii Pisones were closely linked politically throughout the second century BC.

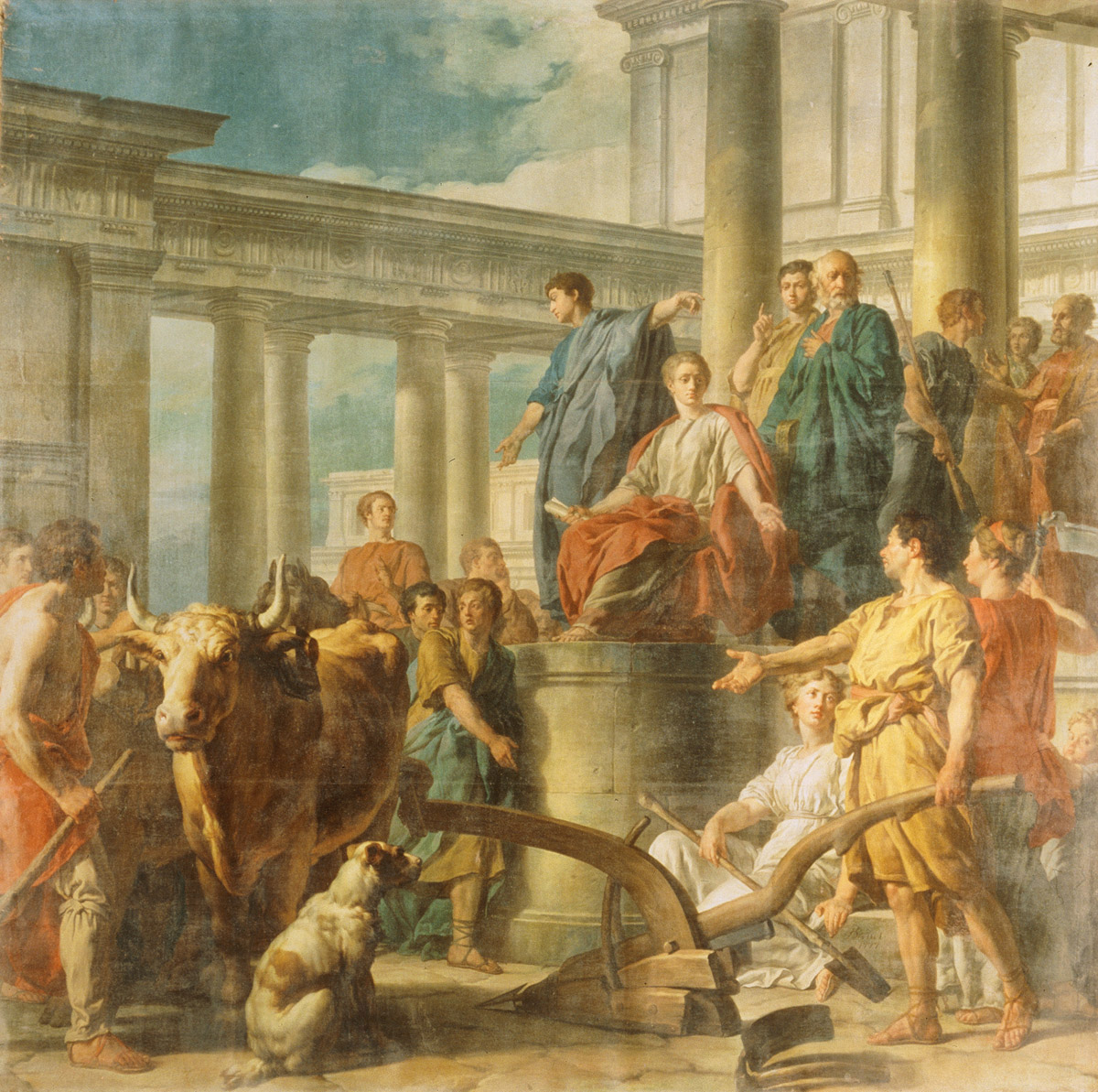
Caius Furius Cressinus Accused of Sorcery, Nicolas-Guy Brenet, 1777 (Musée des Augustins, Toulouse)

Chresimus was a Greek man, likely captured as slave during a war waged by the Roman Republic in the Greek east. He was later freed by a member of the gens Furia, from whom he took his nomen – Furius. His cognomen – Chresimus – means frugal and is the Greek equivalent of the agnomen of Piso (nicknamed Frugi). Chresimus later held a farm and in turn became a slave owner.

Because Chresimus yielded much better harvests from a smaller land than his neighbours, they began to envy him, then sue him for magically poisoning (veneficia) their crops during the night. Chresimus was prosecuted under a provision in the Law of the Twelve Tables which punished by death, or the loss of citizenship, anybody convicted of using magic to take away the fertility of someone else's soil. It is the only known trial where this law played a role. Chresimus' neighbours were probably much richer than him, and they sued him to get rid of a newcomer that could have challenged the social order. Due to his Greek origin, Chresimus may also have been the victim of his neighbours' xenophobia, who denounced him to Albinus, the curule aedile – equivalent of a prosecutor – who decided to charge him before the Centuriate Assembly. Albinus was known to be a firm conservative opposed to Hellenism and religious innovations, like his contemporary Cato the Censor. As consul in 186, Albinus was the leading authority in the famous Bacchanalia Case, a Greek cult of Bacchus in Southern Italy, which triggered a religious scandal and prompted Albinus to spend his entire consulship suppressing the worship.

The trial took place on the Forum, before the other members of Chresimus' tribe and with Albinus presiding. Chresimus brought his farming equipment and his own slaves in order to present himself as more hard-working than his neighbours. Chresimus was thus unanimously acquitted and reintegrated in his tribe.

The story of Chresimus is similar to two other moralizing fragments of Piso's work, especially the story of Gnaeus Flavius (the son of a freedman that became aedile). Piso apparently advocated a "benevolent paternalism" towards slaves as well as personal austerity from nobles in order to reduce social tensions. Piso's remark of Chresimus' well-dressed slaves also fits in this narrative.

== In the Naturalis Historia ==
Writing in the early Roman Empire, two centuries after Piso, Pliny the Elder included the story of Chresimus in his giant encyclopedia Naturalis Historia. The entire anecdote is taken from Piso, as Pliny appreciated his moralizing tone; he cites him more than any other Roman historian. Chresimus' story is told in the book of his Naturalis Historia that deals with grain (Book XVIII), in a chapter on the general principles of agriculture (Chapter VIII), and not in his book on magic (Book XXX). Pliny used the story to show that "hard work brings reward".

nequeo mihi temperare quominus unum exemplum antiquitatis adferam ex quo intellegi possit apud populum etiam de culturis agendi morem fuisse, qualiterque defendi soliti sint illi viri. C. Furius Chresimus e servitute liberatus, cum in parvo admodum agello largiores multo fructus perciperet quam ex amplissimis vicinitas, in invidia erat magna, ceu fruges alienas perliceret veneficiis. quamobrem ab Spurio Albino curuli aedile die dicta metuens damnationem, cum in suffragium tribus oporteret ire, instrumentum rusticum omne in forum attulit et adduxit familiam suam validam atque, ut ait Piso, bene curatam ac vestitam, ferramenta egregie facta, graves ligones, vomeres ponderosos, boves saturos. postea dixit: ‘Veneficia mea, Quirites, haec sunt, nec possum vobis ostendere aut in forum adducere lucubrationes meas vigiliasque et sudores.’ omnium sententiis absolutus itaque est. profecto opera inpensa cultura constat et ideo maiores fertilissimum in agro oculum domini esse dixerunt

— C. Plinius Secundus, Naturalis Historia, liber XVIII, cap. VIII
Translation:

I cannot refrain from adducing one instance from old times which will show that it was customary to bring before the Commons even questions of agriculture, and will exhibit the kind of plea that men of those days used to rely on to defend their conduct. Gaius Furius Chresimus, a liberated slave, was extremely unpopular because he got much larger returns from a rather small farm than the neighbourhood obtained from very large estates, and he was supposed to be using magic spells to entice away other people’s crops. He was consequently indicted by the curule aedile Spurius Albinus; and as he was afraid he would be found guilty, when the time came for the tribes to vote their verdict, he brought all his agricultural implements into court and produced his farm servants, sturdy people and also according to Piso’s description well looked after and well clad, his iron tools of excellent make, heavy mattocks, ponderous ploughshares, and well-fed oxen. Then he said: ‘These are my magic spells, citizens, and I am not able to exhibit to you or to produce in court my midnight labours and early risings and my sweat and toil.’ This procured his acquittal by a unanimous verdict. The fact is that husbandry depends on expenditure of labour, and this is the reason for the saying of our forefathers that on a farm the best fertilizer is the master’s eye.

— Pliny the Elder, Natural History, XVIII.8

== In art ==
A French translation of Pliny's Naturalis Historia by Poinsinet de Sivery was published between 1771 and 1782. Nicolas-René Jollain (the Younger) painted the scene for the 1773 Paris Salon; this was the first major painting on the theme.

Nicolas-Guy Brenet's painting Caius Furius Cressinus Accused of Sorcery linked agriculture with the civic virtue of the Romans. Joseph Marie Terray, the Controller-General of Finances (1769–1774) for Louis XV, commissioned the original work, probably to allay the perception that the abbé Terray was opposed to patriotic agricultural reform. Brenet painted two versions; the first, exhibited in the Salon of 1775 was 3 by 5 feet (0.91 m × 1.52 m), while the copy painted for the Salon of 1777 was much larger, 10 by 10 feet (3.0 m × 3.0 m). This larger version was commissioned for the crown by the comte d'Angiviller, director of the Bâtiments du Roi, and is now in the Musée des Augustins, Toulouse, while the smaller is lost. According to Robert Rosenblum, the scene and Furius Chresimus's apologia echo Jean-Jacques Rousseau's 1762 Emile, or On Education, in which agriculture was described as of all endeavours "the most honest, the most useful, and by consequence the most noble".

The painting of the same subject by the Genevan painter Jean-Pierre Saint-Ours, an admirer and acquaintance of Rousseau, was commissioned in 1792 after his return there from Rome, by a landowner who felt he had been unjustly accused of corruption. It is now in Los Angeles.

== See also ==
- Religion in ancient Rome

== Bibliography ==
=== Ancient sources ===
- Cicero, Tusculanae Disputationes.
- Pliny the Elder, Historia Naturalis (English translation by Harris Rackham, W.H.S. Jones, and D.E. Eichholz on Wikisource).

=== Modern sources ===
- Keith Bradley & Paul Cartledge (eds.), Cambridge World History of Slavery, Volume 1: The Ancient Mediterranean World, Cambridge University Press, 2011.
- T. Robert S. Broughton, The Magistrates of the Roman Republic, American Philological Association, 1951–1952.
- Derek Collins, Magic in the Ancient Greek World, Oxford, Blackwell, 2008.
- Tim Cornell (editor), The Fragments of the Roman Historians, Oxford University Press, 2013,
- Gary Forsythe, The Historian L. Calpurnius Piso Frugi and the Roman Annalistic Tradition, Lanham/London, University Press Of America, 1994.
- Wessell Krul, "Painting Plutarch Images of Sparta in the Dutch Republic and Enlightenment France" in Ancient Models in the Early Modern Republican Imagination, BRILL, 2017, ISBN 9004351388, 9789004351387, [
- Roy K. Gibson, Ruth Morello (editors), Pliny the Elder: Themes and Contexts, Leiden & Boston, Brill, 2011.
- Fritz Graf, Magic in the Ancient World, Cambridge (Mass.), Harvard University Press, 1997 [translated by Franklin Philip].
- August Pauly, Georg Wissowa, Friedrich Münzer, et alii, Realencyclopädie der Classischen Altertumswissenschaft (abbreviated RE), J. B. Metzler, Stuttgart, 1894–1980.
- Maxwell Teitel Paule, "Qvae Saga, Qvis Magvs: on the Vocabulary of the Roman Witch", The Classical Quarterly New Series, Vol. 64, No. 2 (Dec. 2014), pp. 745–757
