= Lucius Postumius =

Lucius Postumius may refer to:

- Lucius Postumius Albinus (consul 234 and 229 BC)
- Lucius Postumius Albinus (consul 173 BC)
- Lucius Postumius Albinus (consul 154 BC)
- Lucius Postumius Megellus (consul 305 BC)
- Lucius Postumius Megellus (consul 262 BC)
