= Aulus Atilius =

Aulus Atilius may refer to either of two Ancient Roman politicians:

- Aulus Atilius Calatinus (d. by 216 BCE)
- Aulus Atilius Serranus (fl. 170 BCE)
