= Marcus Fulvius Nobilior =

Marcus Fulvius Nobilior may refer to:

- Marcus Fulvius Nobilior (consul 189 BC)
- Marcus Fulvius Nobilior (military tribunte) (180 BC)
- Marcus Fulvius Nobilior (consul 159 BC)
- Marcus Fulvius Nobilior (conspirator), part of the Catilinarian conspiracy of 63 BC
