= Gaius Licinius Crassus (consul) =

Roman consul 168 BC

Gaius Licinius Crassus was a Roman politician in the second century BC.

== Family ==
He was a member of the gens Licinia. His brother, Publius Licinius Crassus, served as consul in 171 BC.

== Career ==
In 172 BC, while serving in the capacity of praetor, Crassus investigated Marcus Popilius Laenas for brutality towards the Ligurians. In 171 BC, he served as legate of his brother's soldiers in the Third Macedonian War against Perseus, King of Macedonia. In 168 BC, he was elected consul together with Lucius Aemilius Paullus Macedonicus. In 167 BC, he was Proconsul of the province of Cisalpine Gaul.
