= Quintus Mucius Scaevola (consul 174 BC) =

Quintus Mucius Scaevola (/ˈsiːvələ, ˈsɛv-/ SE(E)V-ə-lə; fl. early 2nd century BC) was a politician of the Roman Republic, believed to be the son of his namesake who was praetor in 215 BC. He was made praetor in 179 BC, and became governor of Sicily. In 174 BC, he was made consul, and in 171 BC, tribune. In this latter position, he accompanied his brother-in-law Publius Licinius Crassus on campaign against Perseus of Macedonia.

His son was Quintus Mucius Scaevola Augur (c. 159 – 88 BC), much younger than his cousins.

Political offices
Preceded by Publius Mucius Scaevola, and Marcus Aemilius Lepidus	Consul of the Roman Republic with Spurius Postumius Albinus Paullulus; 174 BC	Succeeded by Lucius Postumius Albinus, and Marcus Popillius Laenas
