= Jean-Pierre Saint-Ours =

18th and 19th-century Swiss artist

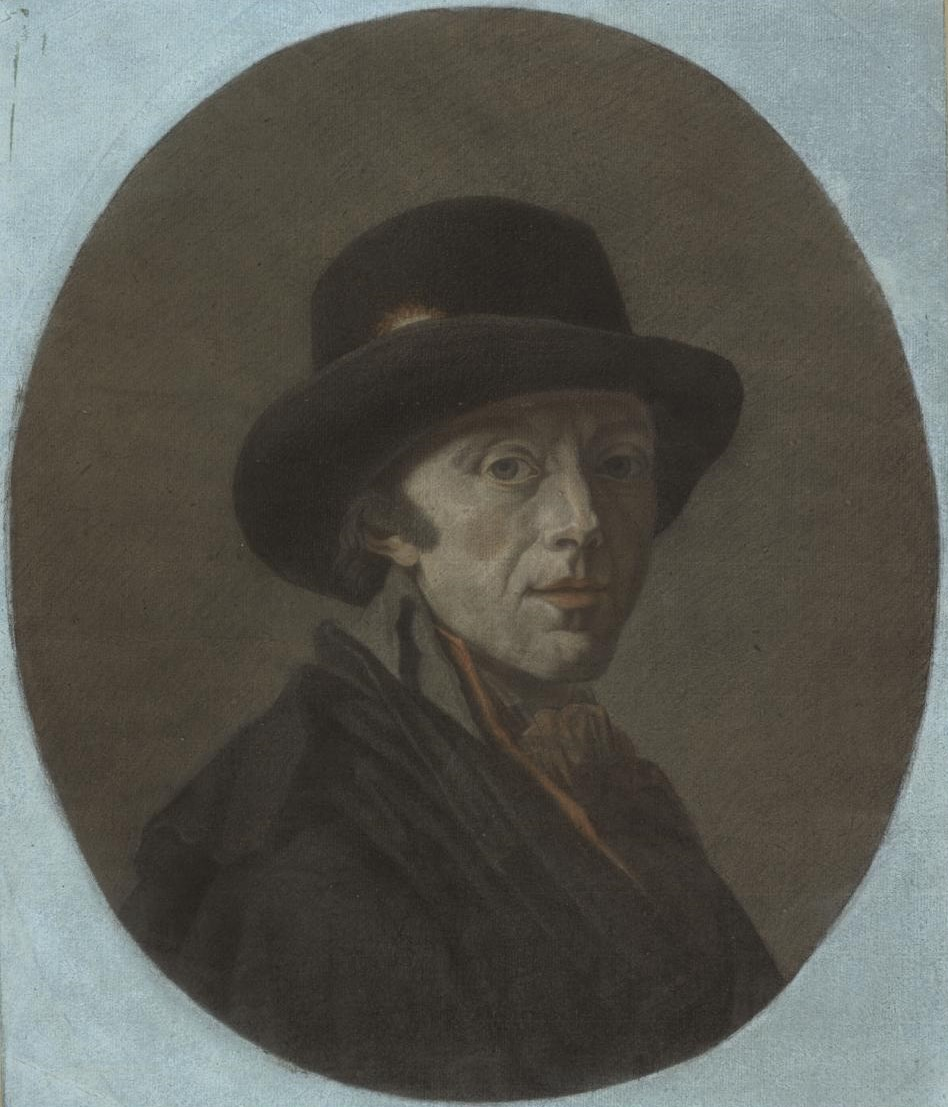
Copy of a self-portrait by Saint-Ours attributed to his daughter, Catherine Saint-Ours

Jean-Pierre Saint-Ours (4 April 1752 – 6 April 1809) was a Swiss painter from Geneva.

As well as relatively informal portraits, he specialized in ambitious history paintings of subjects from ancient, especially classical, history. These are in a Neoclassical style, several with large groups of figures, inevitably drawing comparison with the works of his contemporary Jacques-Louis David, who was four years older. But many of Saint-Ours's works are far smaller, if only because he lacked the commissions to realize them at the full sizes he intended. His major compositions mostly exist as drawings with various degrees of finish, small painted versions and, if he received a commission, the full-size oil paintings, which can often be very large.

After the French Revolution, Saint-Ours returned to Geneva and entered politics, initially as a keen supporter of revolutionary ideas. He later became disillusioned and returned to painting, now mainly as a portraitist of wealthy Genevans.

== Life and work ==
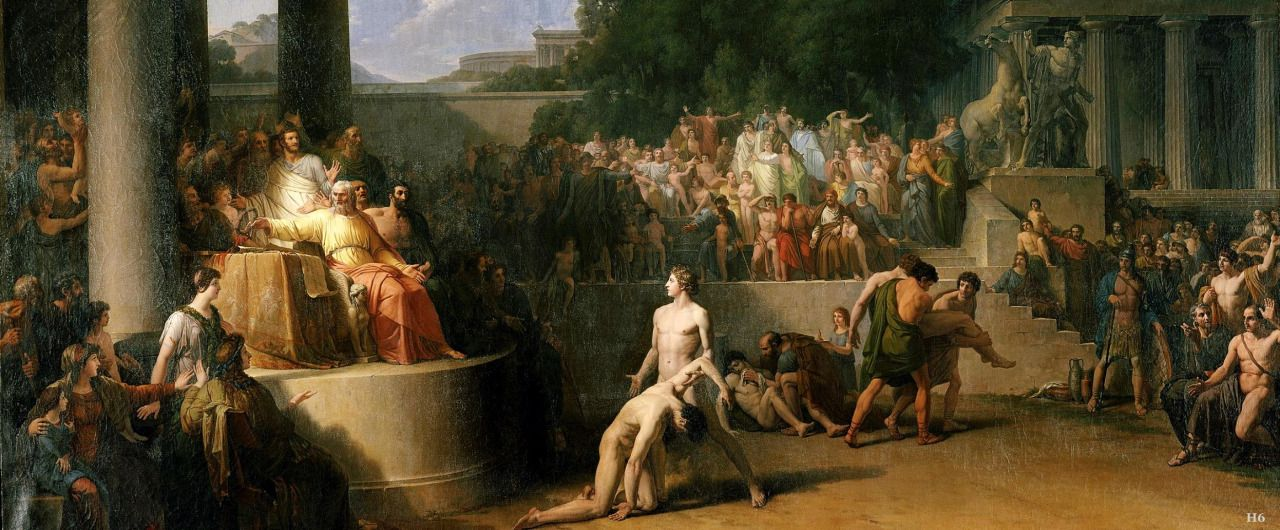
Wrestling at The Olympic Games, 1786–1791, Musée d'Art et d'Histoire, Geneva, 209.5 × 386cm

Saint-Ours was born in Geneva, then an independent Republic. He began studying with his father Jacques (1708–1773) who was an enamel painter. He continued his studies in Paris in 1769, with Joseph-Marie Vien, in whose studio he met David and was exposed to radical political thinking. After winning various lesser prizes, in 1780, he obtained the Prix de Rome with a Rape of the Sabine Women, but was denied a place at the French Academy in Rome, because of his nationality and Protestant religion. He made the journey at his own expense, and was effectively allowed the privileges of membership, but was excluded from French official commissions. With the help of contacts made through Cardinal de Bernis, the French ambassador, he was able to make a successful living in Rome. He strongly supported the French Revolution during its first several years, even as it virtually destroyed the market for the large history paintings he wanted to paint.

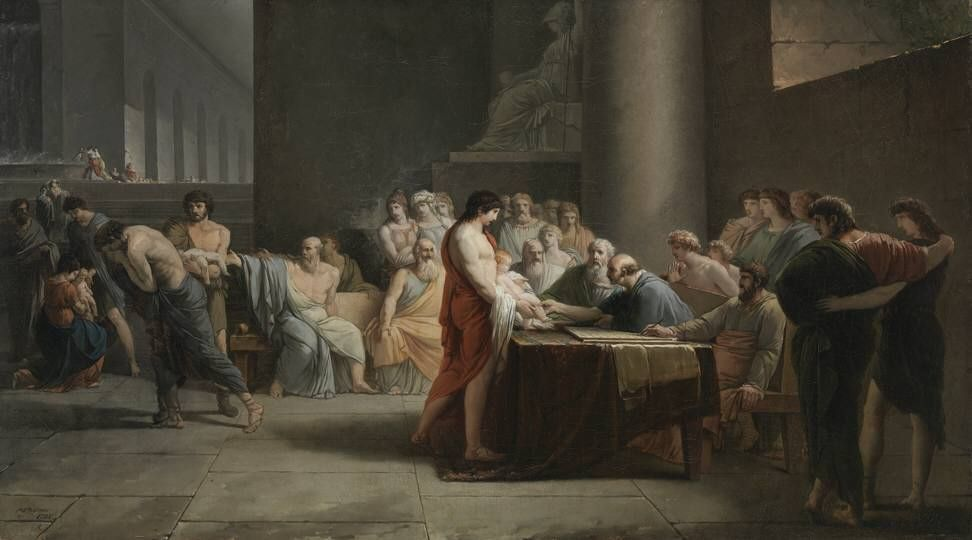
The Selection of Children in Sparta, small version of 1785, 56 cm (22 in) × 100 cm (39.3 in), Neue Pinakothek, Munich

In the first Paris Salon under the Revolution, in 1791, he exhibited three small versions of what he seems to have intended to be a group of four large paintings showing the manners of different ancient peoples, and also the four Ages of Man. Paris saw The Selection of Children in Sparta, Germanic Wedding (these small versions both now in Munich), and The Olympic Games. All these were produced at their considerable full size. The Games (by 1791, 209.5 × 386 cm) and the Selection (by 1786, 138 cm × 260 cm) are both now in Geneva, and the Wedding (by 1788, 136.5 × 259 cm) is now in the Oskar Reinhart Foundation, Winterthur. The Selection of Children in Sparta (Le Choix des enfants de Sparte), based on a story in Plutarch, shows a combination of the severe moralizing impulses of Neoclassicism and the contemporary cult of "sentiment" in the figure at left of the exiting father whose infant has failed the selection; the baby is retained for later exposure.

By 1792, after Revolutionary France invaded Italy, Rome became dangerous for French-speakers, and Saint-Ours returned to Geneva, where he married and entered politics, becoming elected to the Geneva Assemblée Nationale. He painted an allegorical figure of the Republic of Geneva, designed new costumes for the magistrates, and designed for civic festivities. In 1795 he succeeded in getting a bust of Jean-Jacques Rousseau, who he had known, placed on a tall column in the Parc des Bastions. But, disillusioned by developments in France, in 1796 he retired from political involvements and returned to painting, producing mostly portraits of the Genevan elite. He also made several self-portraits, the earliest when he was 13.

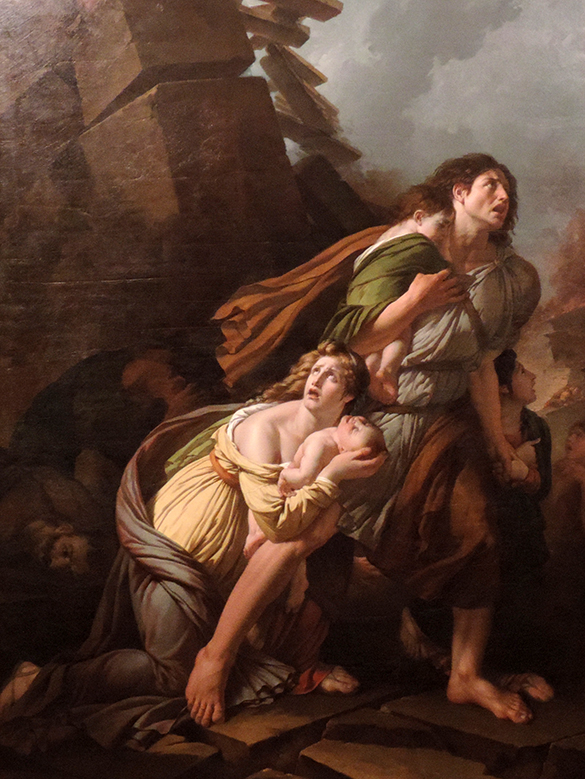
The "Monumental" version of The Earthquake, (Le Tremblement de terre monumental), 1792–1799, 261 × 195 cm, Geneva.

The later versions of his Earthquake, where a family flee from a collapsing Greek temple, show his disillusion with the Revolution and its Napoleonic aftermath; altogether he painted five versions of the subject between 1782 and 1806.

He illustrated one of Rousseau's books with a series of drawings, each repeated in a small oil painting. His portrait of the Genevan geologist and meteorologist Horace-Bénédict de Saussure (1796, Geneva) was much copied in prints. He also drew and painted Italianate landscapes, some with the landscape round Geneva reimagined as a classical scene, as in La ville de Genève idéalisée à l’antique avec le tombeau de Rousseau ("The city of Geneva idealized in antique style, with the tomb of Rousseau"), c. 1794.

== Family and legacy ==
He had married his cousin Madeleine-Hélène Bois de Chêne on his return to Geneva in 1792, and had three daughters. One was still alive in 1871, when after the Paris Commune she destroyed many papers relating to his political activities. On 6 April 1809 he died in Geneva, by then capital of the French Département du Léman after the French revolutionary regime had annexed the republic in 1798.

His reputation was low, even in Geneva, for over a century after his death, but has begun to revive in recent decades. The best collection is in the Musée d'Art et d'Histoire of Geneva, whose establishment Saint-Ours had agitated for, though it was only founded later. The museum held an exhibition devoted to him in 2015–16, with over 100 paintings, as well as many drawings.

Several public and private collections in Switzerland have works, as do the Los Angeles County Museum of Art and the Bavarian State Painting Collections. The French government collections have works, and in 2018 one painting was in the Élysée Palace. They lent his Prix de Rome Rape of the Sabine Women to Guadeloupe, which was then lost in a hurricane in 1928. His works in museum collections may not be on display.

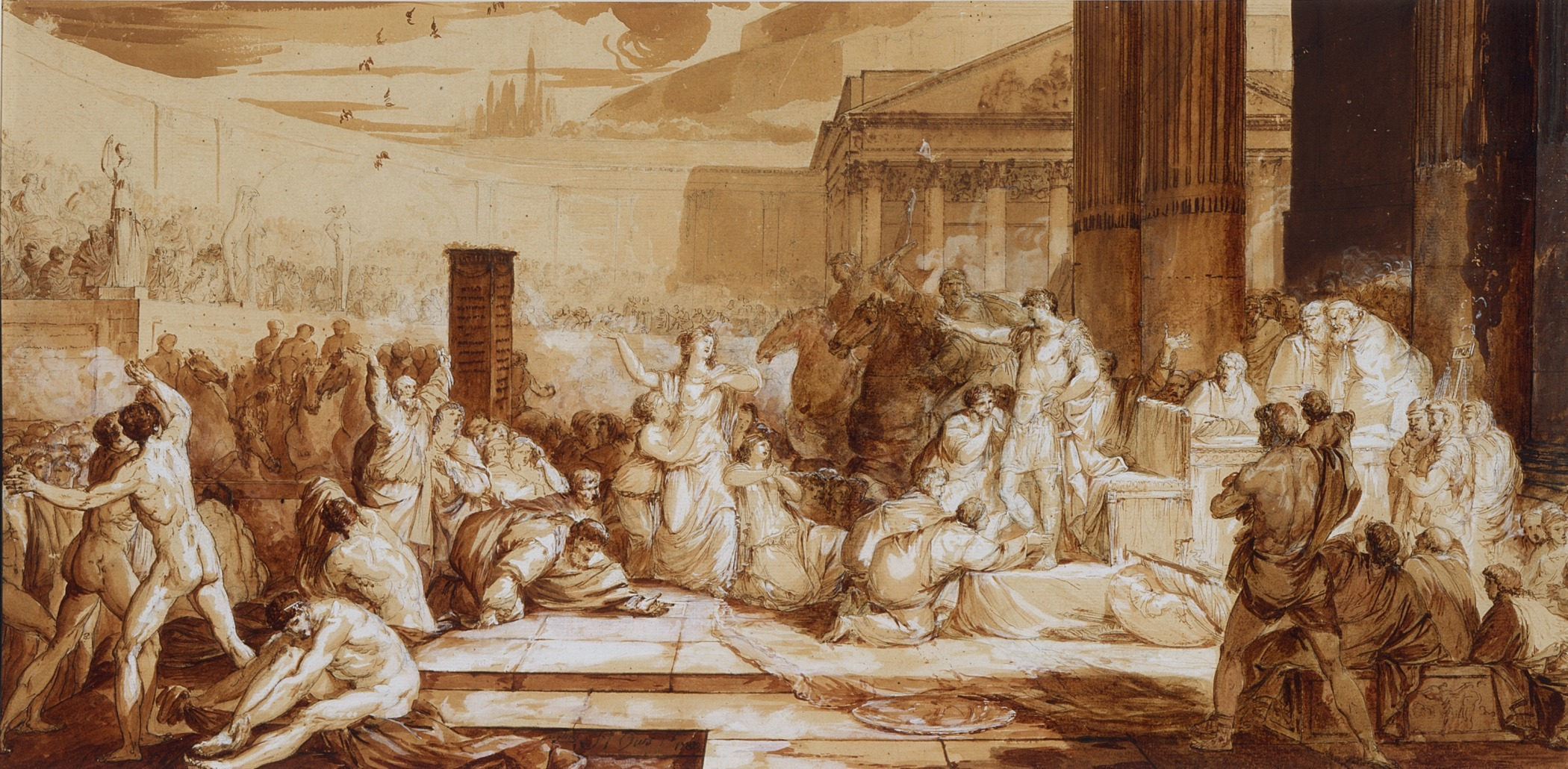
Titus Quinctius Flamininus Granting Liberty to Greece at the Isthmian Games, 1780, drawing

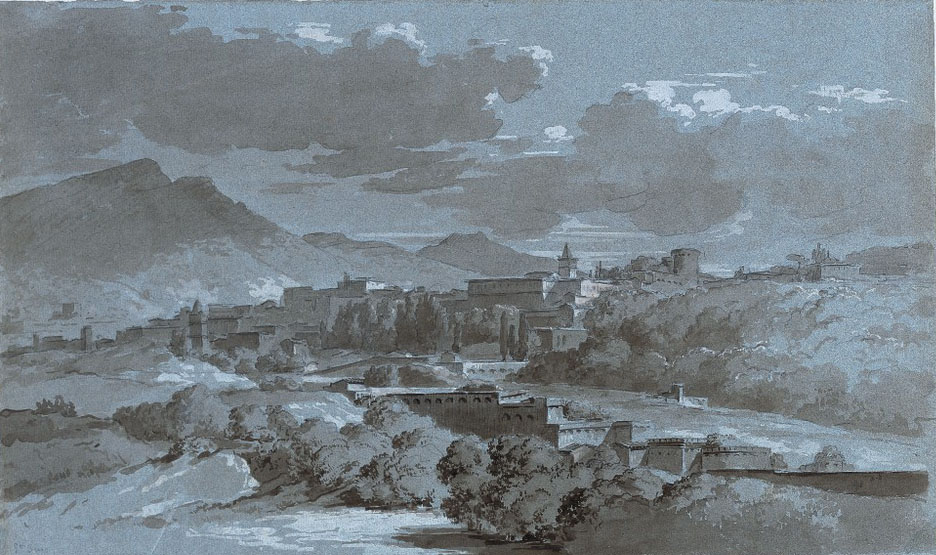
Italian landscape, 1785–86

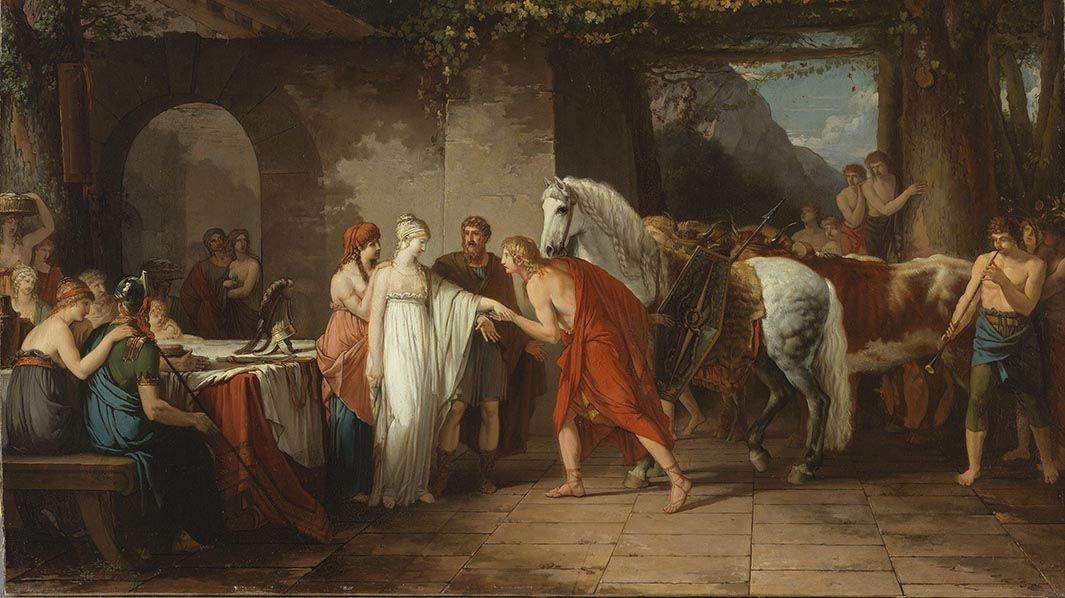
Germanic Wedding, 1787, small version in Munich, 55.9 cm (22 in) × 98.7 cm (38.8 in)

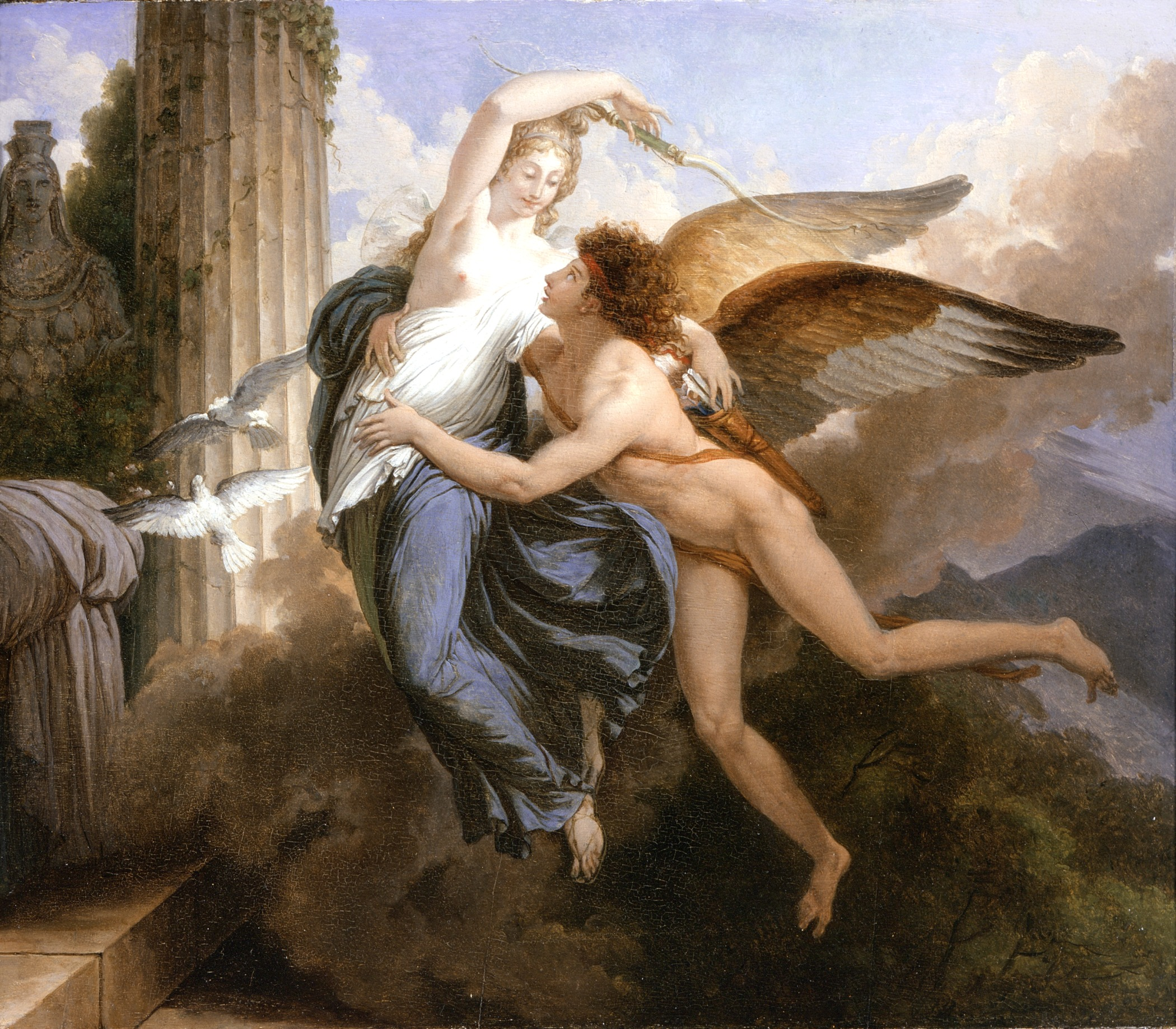
The Reunion of Cupid and Psyche, c. 1789–1792, 13 7/8 × 15 3/4 in. (35.25 × 40.01 cm), preparatory study, LACMA.

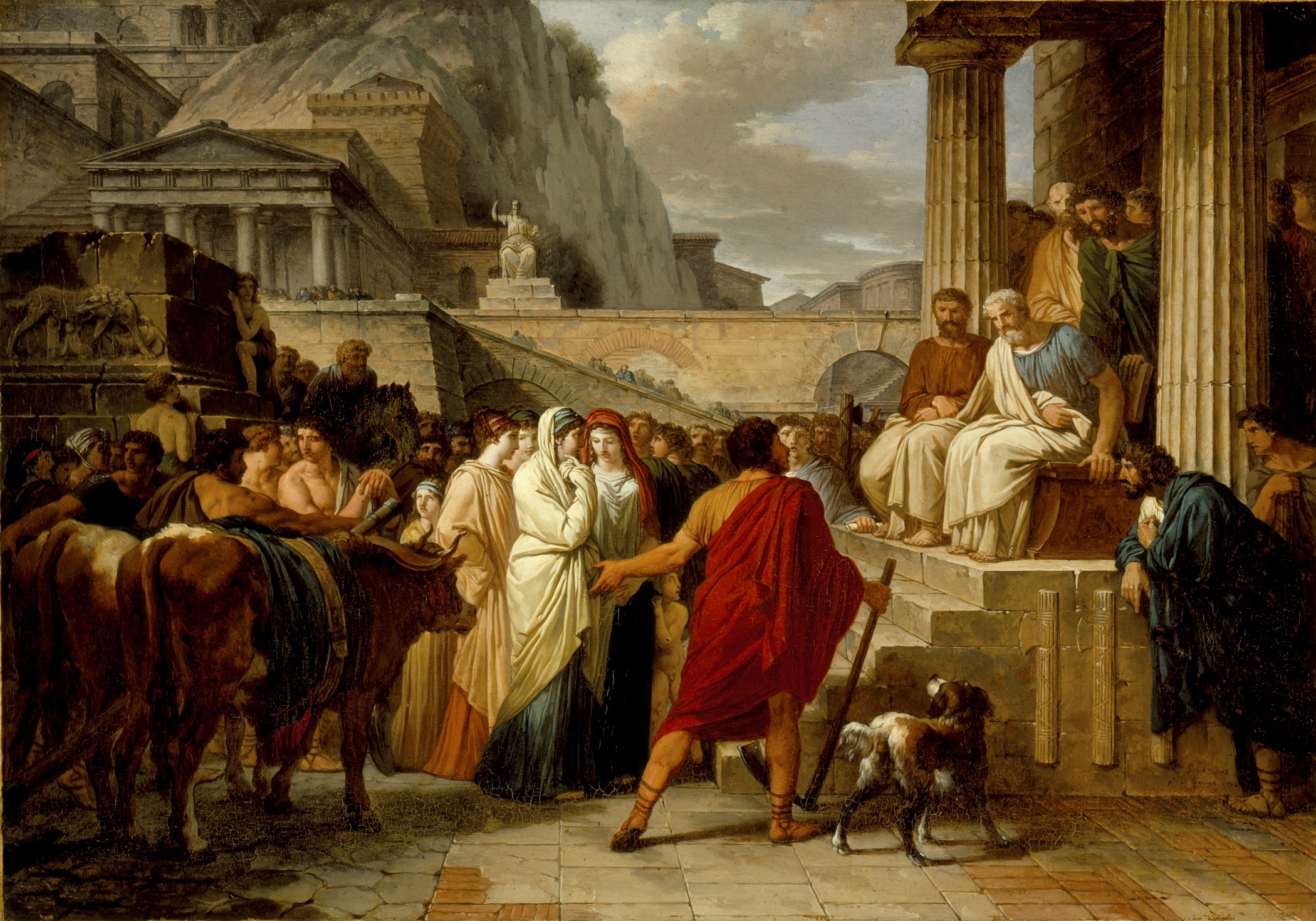
Caius Furius Cressinus Accused of Sorcery, 1792, 19 × 27 in. (48.26 × 68.58 cm), oil on panel

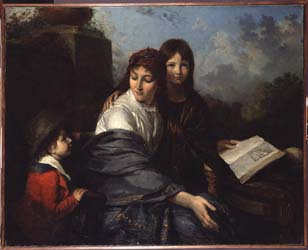
La Lecture de la fable ("Reading the Story", 1796); the artist's wife and her nephews.

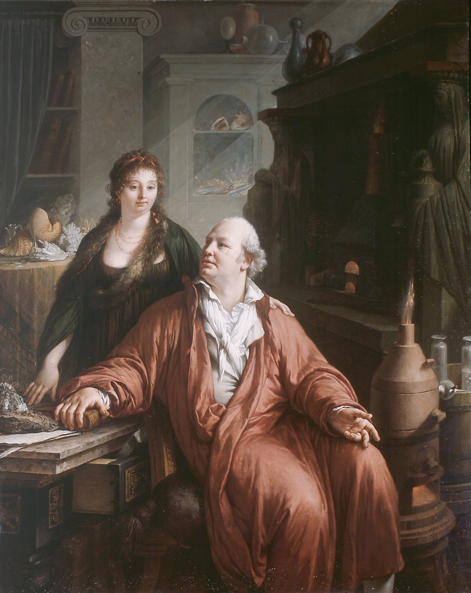
The chemist Pierre-François Tingry in his laboratory, with his wife. 1803

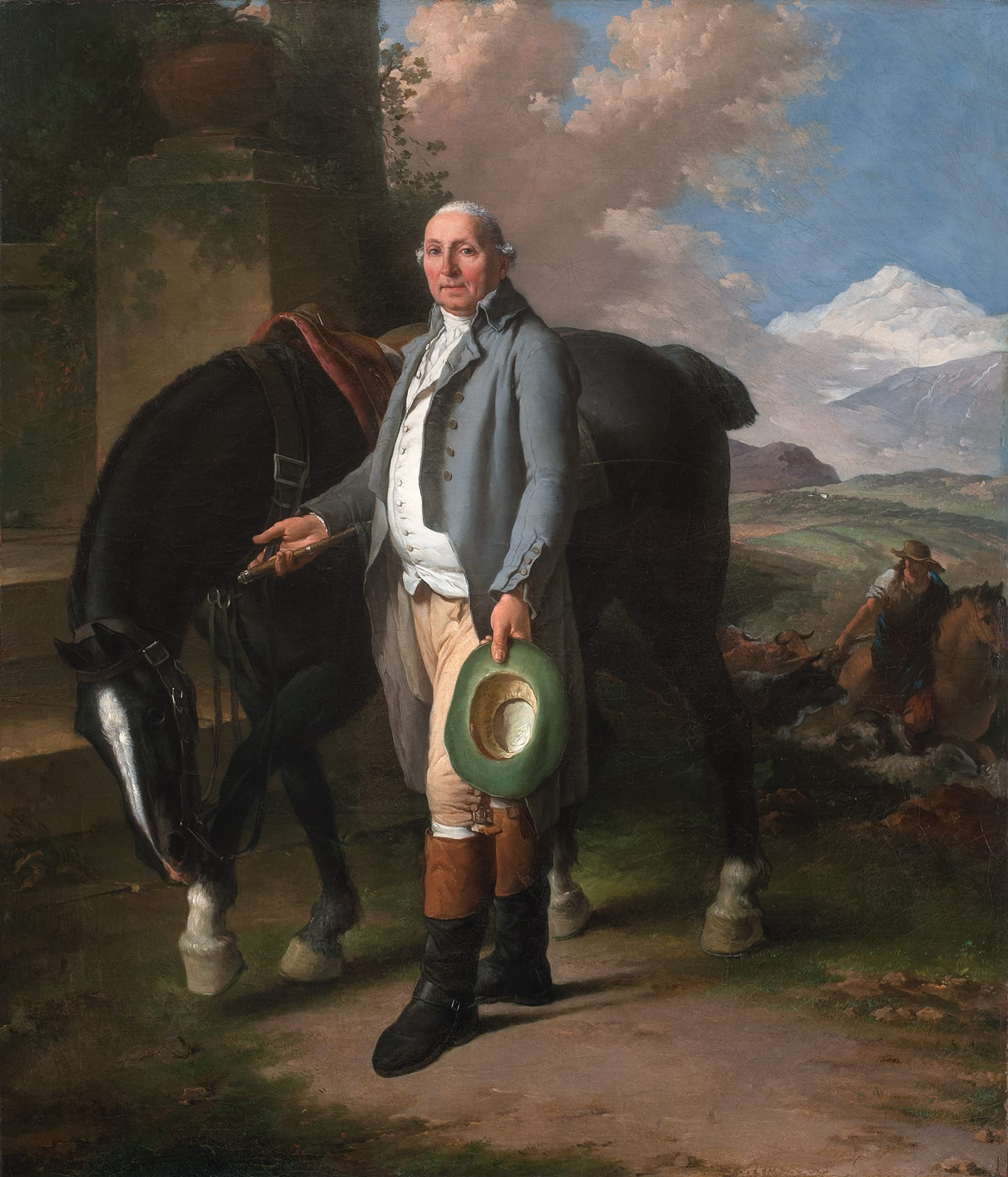
The banker Jacques Mallet (1724-1815)

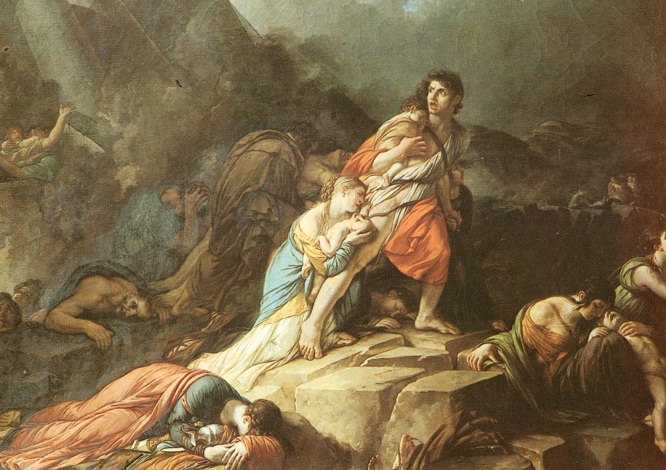
The Earthquake or Allegory of Terror, 1806

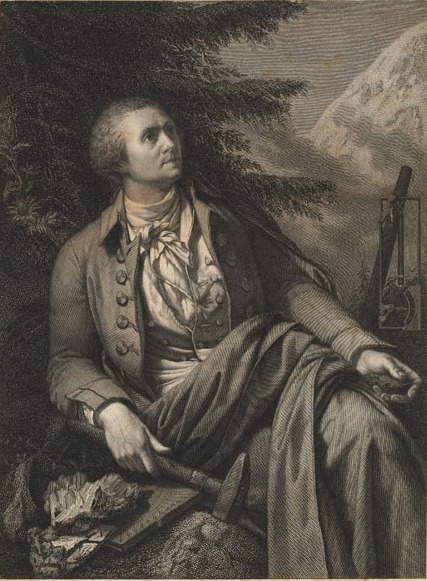
Horace-Bénédict de Saussure - print by Charles Simon Pradier after the portrait of 1796 by Saint-Ours.
