= Lucius Aurelius Orestes (consul 157 BC) =

Lucius Aurelius Orestes (Latin, Lucius Aurelius L. f. L. n. Orestes) was a magistrate and consul in the service of the Roman Republic. He was consul in the year 157 BC together with Sextus Julius Caesar. He was further mentioned in the Roman Fasti and by Gaius Plinius Secundus in his work Historia Naturalis.

Political offices
Preceded by Gaius Popillius Laenas and Marcus Aemilius Lepidus	Consul of the Roman Republic; 157 BC	Succeeded by Lucius Cornelius Lentulus Lupus and Caius Marcius Figulus
