= Marcus Minucius Rufus (consul 110 BC) =

Roman politician and military leader who served as consul in 110 BC

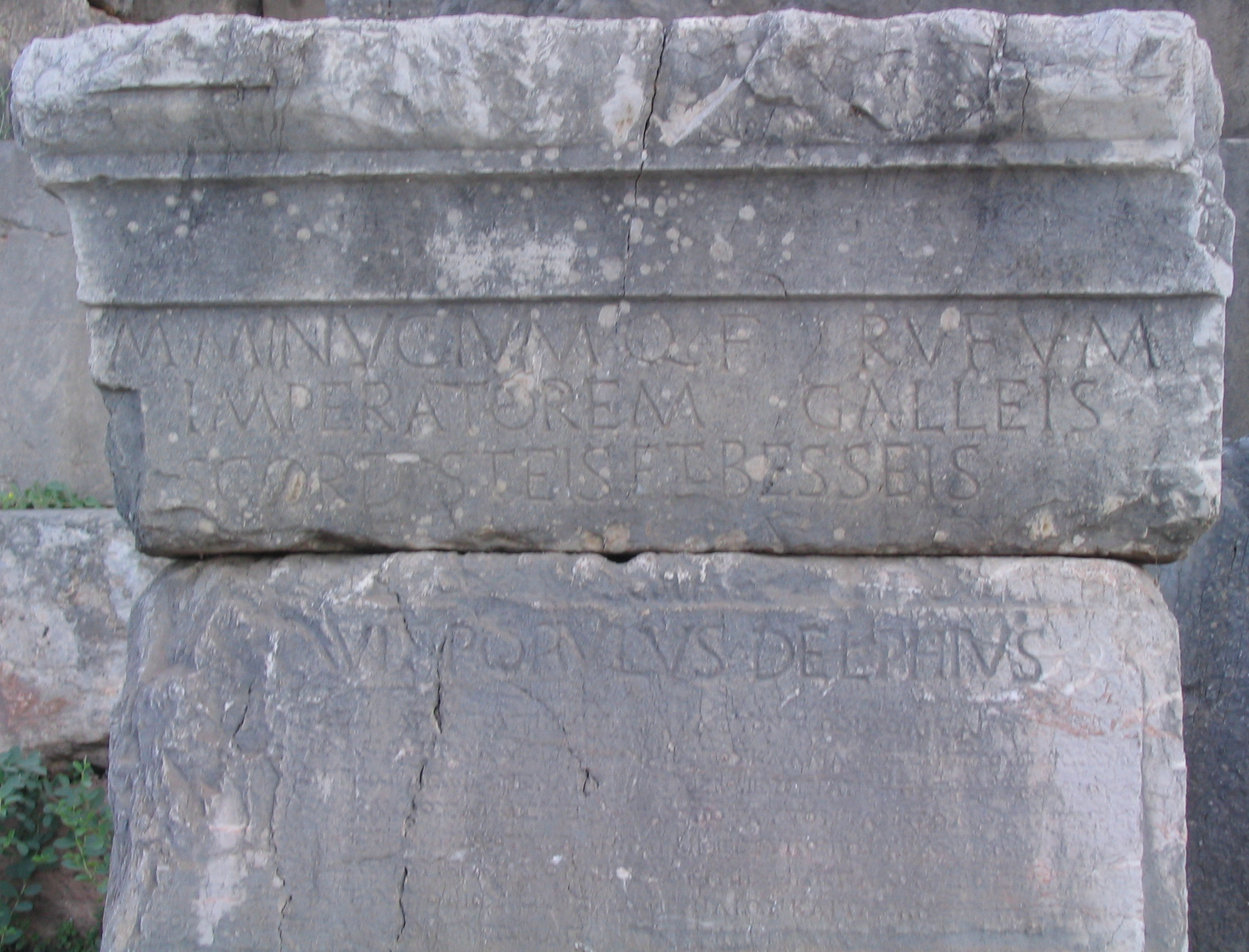
Dedication for Apollo at Delphi commemorating Rufus' victories.

Marcus Minucius Rufus was a Roman politician and military leader who served as consul in 110 BC, alongside Spurius Postumius Albinus.

It is believed that Rufus is the same Marcus Minucius Q. f. Rufus who served as tribune of the plebs in 121 BC, coming into conflict with Gaius Gracchus.

Following his consulship, Rufus was appointed as the proconsul of Macedonia. In this role, he waged war against the Scordisci and the Bessi, and was awarded a triumph by the senate in 106 BC.

Preceded by P. Cornelius Scipio Nasica; Lucius Calpurnius Bestia	Roman consul 110 BC; With: Spurius Postumius Albinus	Succeeded by Q. Caecilius Metellus Numidicus; Marcus Junius Silanus
