= Publius Mucius Scaevola (consul 175 BC) =

Roman senator, general and jurist

Publius Mucius Scaevola (fl. 179–169 BC) was a Roman politician and general.

In 179 BC, as praetor urbanus, he was charged with investigating cases of poisoning in the city of Rome. Scaevola was elected one of the consuls for 175 BC alongside Marcus Aemilius Lepidus. During their term of office, both men campaigned against the Ligurians, and both celebrated triumphs for their successes. Publius's brother Quintus succeeded him in office for the following year.

He was an unsuccessful candidate to the censorship of 169 BC.

Preceded by Gnaeus Cornelius Scipio Hispallus; Quintus Petillius Spurinus	Roman consul 175 BC; With: Marcus Aemilius Lepidus	Succeeded by Spurius Postumius Albinus Paullulus; Quintus Mucius Scaevola
