= Titus Flavius Postumius Varus =

3rd-century Roman senator and consul

Titus Flavius Postumius Varus (fl. 3rd century) was a Roman senator who was appointed suffect consul around AD 250.

== Biography ==
While Postumius Varus was a third-century member of the gens Postumii, he was not descended from the Republican family of the same name. According to Anthony Birley, he was the great-grandson of the orator Marcus Postumius Festus, a friend of the orator Fronto as a well as a fellow African; however Postumius Festus' descendants appear to have made Italy their home. Birley notes Postumius Varus had a brother or cousin, Titus Flavius Postumius Titianus (consul ordinarius 301), whose name implies a link with the family of the emperor Pertinax's wife, Flavia Titiana, although Birley admits "these names were common."

Postumius Varus' first recorded posting was during the 240s as Legatus legionis of the Legio II Augusta, which was stationed in Britannia Inferior. During his time there, he restored a temple of Diana at Isca Augusta. This was followed by his appointment as suffect consul around AD 250.

In 271 the Emperor Aurelian appointed Postumius Varus to the post of Praefectus urbi of Rome. He was put under pressure when riots erupted in the city, and had to rally the urban cohorts to defend Aurelian's rule while the emperor was campaigning against the Iuthungi. His handling of the riots may have led to his dismissal from the post.

During his career, Postumius Varus held two priesthoods, the Augurship and membership in the Quindecimviri sacris faciundis. He was also noted as an orator.

== Sources ==
- Martindale, John R.; Jones, A. H. M.; Morris, John, eds. (1971). The Prosopography of the Later Roman Empire: Volume I, AD 260–395. Cambridge: Cambridge University Press. ISBN 0-521-07233-6.
- Mennen, Inge, Power and Status in the Roman Empire, AD 193-284 (2011)

Political offices
Preceded by Uncertain	Consul suffectus of the Roman Empire around 250	Succeeded by Uncertain
