= Aulus Atilius Serranus =

Roman politician, consul in 170 BCE

Aulus Atilius Serranus was a consul in the year 170 BC, together with Aulus Hostilius Mancinus.

Serranus first held office as praetor in 192 BC; during his year he was dispatched east with a fleet, first to intervene against Nabis of Sparta but then – prorogued into the next year – against Antiochus III.

He was later elected praetor urbanus in 173 BC and instructed to renew the alliance with Antiochus IV Epiphanes. The next year, he may have been charged with ensuring that a part of the Roman army in Brundusium was successfully moved to Macedonia in support of the Third Macedonian War by consul Gaius Popillius Laenas.

After this, he was elected consul in 170 BC. His colleague was Aulus Hostilius Mancinus. He spent most his year in garrison duty in Liguria and Cisalpine Gaul before returning home to hold the consular elections for his successors.

Preceded by Gaius Cassius Longinus and Publius Licinius Crassus	Consul of the Roman Republic with Aulus Hostilius Mancinus; 170 BC	Succeeded by Gnaeus Servilius Caepio and Quintus Marcius Philippus
