= Servius Sulpicius Galba (consul 108 BC) =

Consul 108 BC

Servius Sulpicius Galba (fl. 2nd century BC) was a Roman Senator who was elected consul in 108 BC.

== Biography ==
Sulpicius Galba, a member of the Patrician gens Sulpicia, was the eldest son of Servius Sulpicius Galba who was consul in 144 BC.

It has been speculated that his name was the second one recorded on a Senatus consultum that was passed in 112 BC; however, the name has been preserved only in fragments. After his election as Praetor in around 112 or 111 BC, Sulpicius Galba was appointed the governor of Hispania Ulterior, just as his father had been in 151 BC. He replaced Lucius Calpurnius Piso Frugi, who had died while serving in Spain. By 109 BC he had finished his term in office.

In 109 BC, Sulpicius Galba was elected consul along with Quintus (or Lucius) Hortensius. However, before they took office in 108 BC, Hortensius was prosecuted and condemned for some unknown offence. Hortensius was replaced by Marcus Aurelius Scaurus, who took office with Sulpicius Galba on 1 January 108 BC. In 100 BC, Sulpicius Galba was one of the senators who organised the defense of the Republic against the armed rebellion launched by Plebeian Tribune Lucius Appuleius Saturninus.

Sulpicius Galba probably owned large gardens south of the Aventine Hill, as well as extensive estates near Tarracina, which was the birthplace of the future Roman emperor Galba.

== Bibliography ==
- Broughton, T. Robert S., The Magistrates of the Roman Republic, Vol I (1951)

Political offices
Preceded by Quintus Caecilius Metellus and Marcus Junius Silanus	Consul of the Roman Republic; 108 BC with Marcus Aurelius Scaurus	Succeeded by Lucius Cassius Longinus and Gaius Marius
