= Postumia gens =

Ancient Roman family

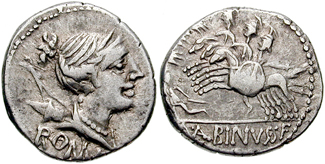
Denarius issued by Aulus Postumius Albinus, moneyer in 96 BC. The obverse depicts a head of Diana, inscribed Roma, while the reverse features three horsemen trampling a fallen enemy.

The gens Postumia was a noble patrician family at ancient Rome. Throughout the history of the Republic, the Postumii frequently occupied the chief magistracies of the Roman state, beginning with Publius Postumius Tubertus, consul in 505 BC, the fifth year of the Republic. Although like much of the old Roman aristocracy, the Postumii faded for a time into obscurity under the Empire, individuals bearing the name of Postumius again filled a number of important offices from the second century AD to the end of the Western Empire.

== Origin ==
The nomen Postumius is a patronymic surname, derived from the praenomen Postumus. That name is derived from the Latin adjective, postremus, meaning "last" or "hindmost," originally indicating a last-born or youngest child. However, its meaning has long been confounded with that of posthumous, indicating a child born after the death of the father; this misunderstanding is fostered by the fact that a posthumous child is also necessarily the youngest.

== Praenomina ==
The most prominent families of the Postumii during the early Republic favored the praenomina Aulus, Spurius, and Lucius, with Marcus, Publius, and Quintus receiving lesser use. Other names are occasionally found toward the end of the Republic, including Gaius, Gnaeus, and Titus.

== Branches and cognomina ==
The earliest family of the Postumii to occur in history bore the cognomen Tubertus, derived from tuber, a lump or swelling. But by far the greatest family of the Postumii bore the surname Albus, white, which in later generations became Albinus, whitish. This family flourished from the beginning of the Republic down to its end, in the first century BC, and for a century all of its members bore the agnomen Regillensis, in memory of the Battle of Lake Regillus, where the Roman dictator Aulus Postumius Albus won everlasting renown by defeating the Latin League, led by Octavius Mamilius and Lucius Tarquinius Superbus, the seventh and last King of Rome, and securing the future of the Republic. (Note: Niebuhr suggests that the Postumii bore the surname Regillensis as a result of having come from the town of Regillum, rather than from the battle. This is how the same cognomen came to be used by the early Claudii, who were residents of Regillum. Livy states that Scipio Africanus was the first to acquire a surname as the result of his military feats. However, the Romans themselves believed that the Postumii bore the surname Regillensis as a consequence of the battle, while the Claudii obtained it from their residence.)

In the later Republic other surnames are found among the Postumii, including Megellus; Pyrgensis, from the Etruscan city of Pyrgi; Tempsanus, from Temesa, a city of Magna Graecia; and Tympanus, from tympanum, a drum. A few of Postumii without cognomina are known from various sources.

== Members ==
This list includes abbreviated praenomina. For an explanation of this practice, see filiation.

=== Postumii Tuberti ===
- Quintus Postumius Tubertus, father of Publius Postumius Tubertus, consul in 505 and 503 BC.
- Publius Postumius Q. f. Tubertus, consul in 505 BC, together with Marcus Valerius Volusus. They defeated the Sabines near Tibur, and received a triumph. Consul again in 503 BC, he defeated either the Aurunci or the Sabines, and received either a second triumph or the first ovation. He was one of the senate's ambassadors to the plebeians at the time of the first secession.
- Aulus Postumius Tubertus, nominated magister equitum in 434 BC, by the dictator Mamercus Aemilius Mamercinus; Tubertus himself was dictator in 431, and won a great victory over the Aequi and Volsci at Mount Algidus, for which he was granted a triumph.

=== Postumii Albi et Albini ===
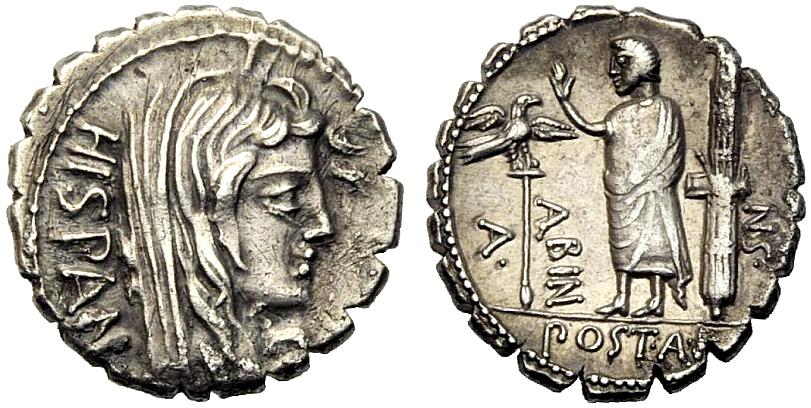
Denarius issued by Aulus Postumius Albinus, moneyer in 81 BC. The obverse with the legend HISPAN refers to Lucius Postumius Albinus, who was awarded a triumph for his victories in Spain.

- Aulus Postumius P. f. Albus Regillensis, nominated dictator in 498 BC, he led the Roman forces against the Latin League at the Battle of Lake Regillus. He was consul in 496.
- Spurius Postumius A. f. P. n. Albus Regillensis, consul in 466 BC, and subsequently one of the ambassadors sent to study Greek law. He was a member of the first decemvirate in 451. As a legate in 446, he commanded the center of the Roman line in an important victory over the Aequi and Volsci.
- Aulus Postumius A. f. P. n. Albus Regillensis, consul in 464 BC, fought against the Aequi. On a subsequent occasion he was sent as an ambassador to the Aequi, but was treated with contempt.
- Spurius Postumius S. f. A. n. Albus Regillensis, consular tribune in 432 BC.
- Publius Postumius A. f. A. n. Albinus Regillensis, consular tribune in 414 BC, was killed in a mutiny after refusing to distribute the spoils of the town of Bolae, which the soldiers had been promised.
- Marcus Postumius A. f. A. n. Albinus Regillensis, censor in 403 BC, imposed a fine on men who did not marry before they were elderly.
- Aulus Postumius Albinus Regillensis, consular tribune in 397 BC, intercepted a raiding party from Tarquinii, with a force made entirely of volunteers, as the tribunes of the plebs had prevented the regular levy.
- Spurius Postumius Albinus Regillensis, consular tribune in 394 BC, fought against the Aequi, whom he defeated after an initial setback.
- Spurius Postumius Albinus Caudinus, consul in 334 BC, censor in 332, and magister equitum in 327. Consul for the second time in 321, during the Second Samnite War, he and his colleague were trapped at the Battle of the Caudine Forks, and their entire army forced to go under the yoke.
- Lucius Postumius L. f. Albinus, became Rex Sacrorum circa 275 BC.
- Aulus Postumius L. f. L. n. Albinus, father of Aulus Postumius Albinus, the consul of 242 BC.
- Aulus Postumius A. f. L. n. Albinus, consul in 242 BC, the final year of the First Punic War. The Pontifex Maximus forbade him to leave Rome in order to participate in the war, on the grounds that he was the Flamen Martialis. He was censor in 234.
- Lucius Postumius A. f. A. n. Albinus, consul in 234 and 229 BC, fought against the Illyrians. He was praetor in 216, during the Second Punic War, and assigned the province of Cisalpine Gaul. He was elected consul for the third time in 215, but slain by the Boii before entering into office.
- Spurius Postumius L. f. A. n. Albinus, consul in 186 BC, the year that the senate took action to prohibit the worship of Bacchus at Rome, following a general panic over the secret and allegedly terrible rites.
- Aulus Postumius A. f. A. n. Albinus Luscus, consul in 180 BC, fought against the Ligurians. As censor in 174 BC, he and his colleague expelled nine members of the senate, and degraded a number of equites. He was sent on a number of diplomatic missions, and was one of the commissioners sent to assist Lucius Aemilius Paullus Macedonicus restore order to Macedonia in 168.
- Spurius Postumius A. f. A. n. Albinus Paullulus, praetor in 183 BC, was assigned the province of Sicily. He was consul in 174.
- Lucius Postumius A. f. A. n. Albinus, praetor in 180 BC, was assigned the province of Hispania Ulterior, where he defeated the Vaccei and Lusitani, and received a triumph. Consul in 173 BC, he restored the Floralia, and dealt with land disputes in Campania. He served under Aemilius Paullus during the Third Macedonian War.
- Lucius Postumius Sp. f. L. n. Albinus, as curule aedile in 161 BC, gave the Megalesia. He was consul in 154, but died shortly after leaving Rome. A rumour circulated that he had been poisoned by his wife.
- Aulus Postumius A. f. A. n. Albinus, served under Aemilius Paullus in 168 BC, he was given custody of Perseus. As consul in 151, he was imprisoned by the tribunes of the plebs for pursuing the levy with too much vigor. Later an ambassador to Greece, where he was well received, he wrote extensively in Greek, including a history of Rome, which was poorly regarded by other writers.
- Spurius Postumius Albinus Magnus, a rhetorician whom Cicero describes in Brutus, as the author of many extant orations. He was consul in 148 BC, and during his year of office, much of the city was destroyed in a great fire.
- Lucius Postumius (L. f. Sp. n.) Albinus, triumvir monetalis in 131 BC.
- Spurius Postumius (Sp. f.) Albinus, consul in 110 BC, had command of the war against Jugurtha, but took no offensive action, either through indecision, susceptibility to the deceptions of the Numidian king, or, some alleged, bribery. He was subsequently condemned by the lex Mamilia, a law punishing those who had aided Jugurtha.
- Aulus Postumius (Sp. f.) Albinus, legate under his brother, the consul Spurius, during the Jugurthine war, he was lured into an ambush and defeated by Jugurtha, and forced to submit. He was consul in 99 BC, and ten years later commander of a Roman fleet during the Social War, in the course of which he was murdered by his own men.
- Aulus Postumius Sp. f. Sp. n. Albinus, son of Spurius, the consul of 110, was triumvir monetalis in the late 90s BC. He is likely the 'Albinus' who fell at the Battle of the Colline Gate against Sulla.
- Aulus Postumius A. f. Sp. n. Albinus, triumvir monetalis in 81 BC, was a grandson of Spurius, the consul of 110.
- Postumia, wife of Servius Sulpicius Rufus.
- Aulus Postumius Albinus, placed in command of Sicily by Caesar in 48 BC.
- Decimus Junius (D. f. D. n.) Brutus Albinus, a descendant of the Junii Bruti, was adopted by an unknown Aulus Postumius Albinus. Caesar placed him in command of his fleet during the Civil War, but Brutus would become one of his assassins.

=== Postumii Megelli ===
- Lucius Postumius S. f. (Megellus), father of Lucius Postumius Megellus, consul in 305, 294, and 291 BC.
- Lucius Postumius L. f. S. n. Megellus, consul in 305 BC, during the Second Samnite War, captured a number of towns from the Samnites. Consul for the second time in 294, during the Third Samnite War, he defeated the Samnites and the Etruscans, and received a triumph. In his third consulship, BC 291, he captured Cominium, but made a number of enemies through his conduct, and was fined a previously unheard-of 500,000 asses.
- Lucius Postumius L. f. L. n. Megellus, consul in 262 BC, early in the First Punic War, together with his colleague, Quintus Mamilius Vitulus, captured Agrigentum in Sicily after a siege lasting six months. He was censor in 253, and died the same year.

=== Others ===
- Postumia, a Vestal Virgin, was accused of unchastity in 420 BC, apparently due to her taste in fashionable clothing and unseemly gregariousness. Although reprimanded by the Pontifex Maximus for her lack of humility, she was acquitted of the charges.
- Marcus Postumius Pyrgensis, a publican during the Second Punic War, was tried for peculatio (embezzlement) and fraud in 212 BC. He was condemned despite considerable support from the other publicani and one of the tribunes of the plebs, but went into exile before sentence could be passed.
- Lucius Postumius Tympanus, quaestor in 194 BC, fell in battle against the Boii.
- Lucius Postumius Tempsanus, praetor in 185 BC, was sent to deal with an insurrection in the neighborhood of Tarentum, which he put down with great severity. He also sought out fugitives alleged to have celebrated the Bacchanalia, after the panic attending the discovery of the rites at Rome.
- Aulus Postumius, one of the military tribunes in 180 BC.
- Gaius Postumius, military tribune in 168 BC.
- Postumius, divined that Sulla would succeed in his endeavours, either before a battle with the Samnites in 90 BC, or during his march on Rome in 88. Postumius volunteered to be placed in chains, and put to death if he proved mistaken.
- Lucius Postumius, praetor in 90 BC, was killed by the Samnites at Nola.
- Marcus Postumius, a quaestor serving under Verres during his administration of Sicily in 73 BC.
- Gnaeus Postumius, supported the prosecution of Lucius Licinius Murena by Servius Sulpicius Rufus, in 63 BC.
- Titus Postumius, praised by Cicero as an orator of some merit. He may be the same Postumius who refused the command in Sicily in 49 BC.
- Postumius, a partisan of Pompeius on the outbreak of the Civil War in 49 BC, was appointed to the government of Sicily, but refused to take up the office unless accompanied by Cato.
- Postumius, a legate of Caesar in 48 BC. Caesar sent him to Italy in order to arrange the passage of his army.
- Publius Postumius, a friend of Marcus Claudius Marcellus, the consul of 51 BC.
- Quintus Postumius, a Roman senator who, having initially supported Marcus Antonius, wavered and thought of going over to Octavian in 31 BC. Antonius had him murdered.
- Gaius Postumius Pollio, an architect, and probably the builder of the temple of Apollo at Tarracina. He was the master of Gaius Cocceius, who after receiving his freedom built the temple of Augustus at Puteoli.
- Lucius Postumius Q. f. Sergius Fabullus, a contemporary of Marcus Aurelius, the equestrian husband of Manlia Silana.
- Marcus Postumius Festus, consul suffectus in AD 160, and ancestor of Titus Flavius Postumius Varus, praetor urbanus in AD 271.
- Titus Flavius Postumius Varus, consul circa AD 250, and praetor urbanus in 271.
- Titus Flavius Postumius Quietus, consul in AD 272.
- Titus Flavius Postumius Titianus, consul in an uncertain year, and a second time AD 301.
- Rufius Postumius Festus, consul in AD 472.

== Descent of the Postumii Albini ==
This chart shows the probable descent of the Postumii Albini, from the sixth century BC to the end of the Republic. The chart is based on one found in the Realencyclopädie der Classischen Altertumswissenschaft.

Stemma Postumiorum Albinorum

P. Albus
A. Albus Regillensis dict. 498 BC cos. 496
Sp. Albus Regillensis cos. 466 BC; Xvir 451 | A. Albinus Regillensis cos. 464 BC
Sp. Albus Regillensis cos. trib. 432 BC | P. Albinus Regillensis cos. trib. 414 BC | M. Albinus Regillensis cens. 403 BC | A. Albinus Regillensis cos. trib. 397 BC | Sp. Albinus Regillensis cos. trib. 394 BC
Sp. Albinus Caudinus cos. 334, 321 BC
L. Albinus
L. Albinus rex sacr. c. 275 BC
A. Albinus
A. Albinus (A.f.L.n.) cos. 242 BC
A. Albinus | L. Albinus (A.f.A.n.) cos. 234, 229 BC | (Sp.) Albinus
A. Albinus Luscus (A.f.A.n.) cos. 180 BC | Sp. Albinus Paullulus (A.f.A.n.) cos. 174 BC | L. Albinus (A.f.A.n.) cos. 173 BC | L. Albinus Tympanus q. 194 BC | Sp. Albinus (L.f.A.n.) cos. 186 BC | Albinus
A. Albinus (A.f.A.n.) cos. 151 BC | Sp. Albinus | L. Albinus (Sp.f.L.n.) cos. 154 BC | Sp. Albinus Magnus cos. 148 BC
Sp. Albinus cos. 110 BC | A. Albinus cos. 99 BC | L. Albinus mon. 131 BC fl. mart. | Sp. Albinus
A. Albinus (Sp.f.Sp.n.) mon. 88 BC | A. Albinus (A.f.Sp.n.) mon. 81 BC | L. Albinus pr. 90 BC
A. Albinus leg. Caes. 48 BC | D. Junius; Brutus Albinus

== See also ==
- List of Roman gentes

== Bibliography ==
- Polybius, Historiae (The Histories).
- Marcus Tullius Cicero, Academica Priora, Brutus, Cato Maior de Senectute, De Divinatione, De Legibus, De Natura Deorum, De Officiis, Epistulae ad Atticum, Epistulae ad Familiares, In Verrem, Post Reditum in Quirites, Pro Murena, Tusculanae Quaestiones.
- Gaius Sallustius Crispus (Sallust), Bellum Jugurthinum (The Jugurthine War).
- Diodorus Siculus, Bibliotheca Historica (Library of History).
- Dionysius of Halicarnassus, Romaike Archaiologia (Roman Antiquities).
- Titus Livius (Livy), History of Rome.
- Publius Ovidius Naso (Ovid), Fasti.
- Valerius Maximus, Factorum ac Dictorum Memorabilium (Memorable Facts and Sayings).
- Gaius Plinius Secundus (Pliny the Elder), Historia Naturalis (Natural History).
- Sextus Julius Frontinus, Strategemata (Stratagems).
- Lucius Mestrius Plutarchus (Plutarch), Lives of the Noble Greeks and Romans, Moralia.
- Appianus Alexandrinus (Appian), Bellum Civile (The Civil War), Bellum Samniticum (History of the Samnite War).
- Cassius Dio, Roman History.
- Julius Obsequens, Liber de Prodigiis (The Book of Prodigies).
- Eutropius, Breviarium Historiae Romanae (Abridgement of the History of Rome).
- Paulus Orosius, Historiarum Adversum Paganos (History Against the Pagans).
- Joannes Zonaras, Epitome Historiarum (Epitome of History).
- Barthold Georg Niebuhr, The History of Rome, Julius Charles Hare and Connop Thirlwall, trans., John Smith, Cambridge (1828).
- Desiré-Raoul Rochette, Lettre à M. Schorn, Firmin Didot Frères, Paris (1832).
- Dictionary of Greek and Roman Biography and Mythology, William Smith, ed., Little, Brown and Company, Boston (1849).
- Dictionary of Greek and Roman Antiquities, William Smith, ed., Little, Brown, and Company, Boston (1859).
- August Pauly, Georg Wissowa, et alii, Realencyclopädie der Classischen Altertumswissenschaft (Scientific Encyclopedia of the Knowledge of Classical Antiquities, abbreviated RE or PW), J. B. Metzler, Stuttgart (1894–1980).
- George Davis Chase, "The Origin of Roman Praenomina", in Harvard Studies in Classical Philology, vol. VIII (1897).
- T. Robert S. Broughton, The Magistrates of the Roman Republic, American Philological Association (1952–1986).
- E.T. Salmon, Samnium and the Samnites, Cambridge University Press (1967)
- Géza Alföldy, Flamines Provinciae Hispaniae Citerioris (The Flamens of the Province of Hispania Citerior), Madrid (1973).
- Michael Crawford, Roman Republican Coinage, Cambridge University Press (1974, 2001).
- Arnold Hugh Martin Jones and John Robert, The Prosopography of the Later Roman Empire, Parts 395–527, vol. II, Cambridge University Press (1980).
- Robert E. A. Palmer, Studies of the Northern Campus Martius in Ancient Rome (1990).
- Inge Mennen, Power and Status in the Roman Empire, AD 193–284 (2011).
- Eva María Morales Rodríguez, Las Ciudades Romanas en el Alto Guadalquivir (The Roman Cities of the Old Guadalquivir, 2013).
