= Gnaeus Cornelius Dolabella (consul 159 BC) =

Roman consul 159 BC

Gnaeus Cornelius Dolabella was a Roman politician in the second century BC.

== Career ==
In 165 BC, Dolabella served as aedile alongside Sextus Julius Caesar. They organized the Megalesian games, holding the first performance of Terence's play Hecyra. In 162 BC, Dolabella served as praetor. In 159 BC, Dolabella was elected consul together with Marcus Fulvius Nobilior as his colleague. The consuls introduced the Lex Cornelia Fulvia (an anti-bribery law) and, per the Fasti Triumphales, waged war against Liguria.
