= Gaius Popillius Laenas =

Roman consul in 172 and 158 BC

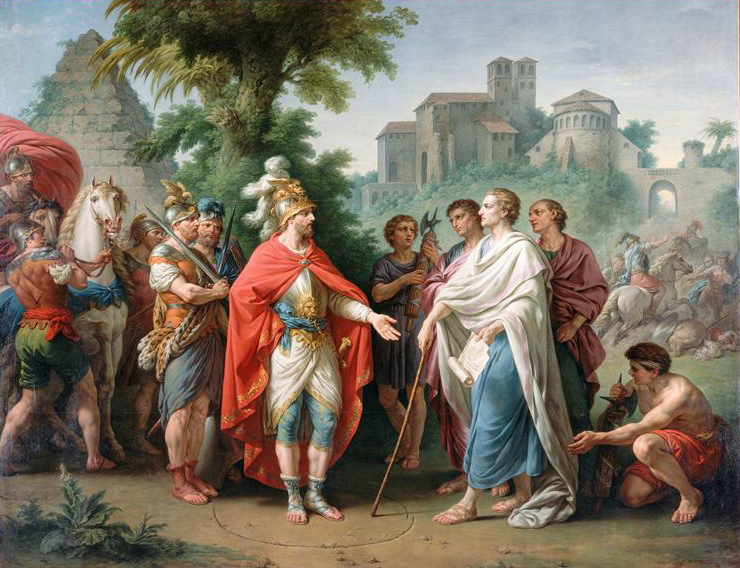
Popilius sent as ambassador to Antiochus Epiphanes to stop the course of his ravages in Egypt. 1779

Gaius Popillius Laenas (fl. 172–158 BC) was a politician and general of the Roman Republic. He was consul two times, once in 172 and once in 158 BC.

He was sent as an envoy to prevent a war between Antiochus IV Epiphanes of the Seleucid Empire and Ptolemaic Egypt. On being confronted with the Roman demands that he abort his attack on Alexandria, Antiochus played for time; Popillius Laenas is supposed to have drawn a circle around the king in the sand with his cane, and ordered him not to move out of it until a firm answer had been given. The Syrians withdrew. According to Livy:

After receiving the submission of the inhabitants of Memphis and of the rest of the Egyptian people, some submitting voluntarily, others under threats, [Antiochus] marched by easy stages towards Alexandria. After crossing the river at Eleusis, about four miles from Alexandria, he was met by the Roman commissioners, to whom he gave a friendly greeting and held out his hand to Popilius. Popilius, however, placed in his hand the tablets on which was written the decree of the senate and told him first of all to read it. After reading it through, he said he would call his friends into council and consider what he ought to do. Popilius, stern and imperious as ever, drew a circle round the king with the stick he was carrying and said, "Before you step out of that circle give me a reply to lay before the senate." For a few moments he hesitated, astounded at such a peremptory order, and at last replied, "I will do what the senate thinks right." Not till then did Popilius extend his hand to the king as to a friend and ally. Antiochus evacuated Egypt at the appointed date, and the commissioners exerted their authority to establish a lasting concord between the brothers, as they had as yet hardly made peace with each other. Ab Urbe Condita, xlv.12.

Polybius, the Greek historian of the Hellenistic Period, added more nuanced detail in his major work, The Histories, which covered the period of 264–146 BC in detail:

At the time when Antiochus approached Ptolemy and meant to occupy Pelusium, Caius Popilius Laenas, the Roman commander, on Antiochus greeting him from a distance and then holding out his hand, handed to the king, as he had it by him, the copy of the senatus-consultum, and told him to read it first, not thinking it proper, as it seems to me, to make the conventional sign of friendship before he knew if the intentions of him who was greeting him were friendly or hostile. But when the king, after reading it, said he would like to communicate with his friends about this intelligence, Popilius acted in a manner which was thought to be offensive and exceedingly arrogant. He was carrying a stick cut from a vine, and with this he drew a circle round Antiochus and told him he must remain inside this circle until he gave his decision about the contents of the letter. The king was astonished at this authoritative proceeding, but, after a few moments' hesitation, said he would do all that the Romans demanded. Upon this Popilius and his suite all grasped him by the hand and greeted him warmly. The letter ordered him to put an end at once to the war with Ptolemy. So, as a fixed number of days were allowed to him, he led his army back to Syria, deeply hurt and complaining indeed, but yielding to circumstances for the present. Popilius after arranging matters in Alexandria and exhorting the two kings there to act in common, ordering them also to send Polyaratus to Rome, sailed for Cyprus, wishing to lose no time in expelling the Syrian troops that were in the island. When they arrived, finding that Ptolemy's generals had been defeated and that the affairs of Cyprus were generally in a topsy-turvy state, they soon made the Syrian army retire from the country, and waited until the troops took ship for Syria. In this way the Romans saved the kingdom of Ptolemy, which had almost been crushed out of existence: Fortune having so directed the matter of Perseus and Macedonia that when the position of Alexandria and the whole of Egypt was almost desperate, all was again set right simply because the fate of Perseus had been decided. For had this not been so, and had not Antiochus been certain of it, he would never, I think, have obeyed the Roman behests. Polybius, The Histories, Fragments of Book XXIX, published in Vol. VI of the Loeb Classical Library edition, 1922-1927.

Popillius Laenas' fleet is the one referred to in Daniel 11: "For ships of Kittim will come against him; therefore he will be disheartened and will return," (Daniel 11:30).(Goldingay, p.301)

Preceded by Lucius Postumius Albinus; Marcus Popillius Laenas	Roman consul 172 BC; With: Publius Aelius Ligus	Succeeded by Publius Licinius Crassus; Gaius Cassius Longinus
Preceded by Gnaeus Cornelius Dolabella; Marcus Fulvius Nobilior	Roman consul II; 158 BC; With: Marcus Aemilius Lepidus	Succeeded by Sextus Julius Caesar; Lucius Aurelius Orestes
