= Gaius Cassius Longinus (consul 171 BC) =

- Born: Unknown
- Military career
- Allegiance: Roman Republic
- Service years: 171 BCE, 154 BCE
- Rank: Consul, Censor
- Commands: Roman army
- Conflicts: Third Macedonian War in Italy

Gaius Cassius Longinus was a Roman consul in the year 171 BCE, together with Publius Licinius Crassus. He was probably praetor urbanus in 174 BC.

Cassius Longinus was not given a command position as he had hoped during the Third Macedonian War, and instead was sent to the northern border of Italy in the province of Illyria to man a defense against attacks from Macedon. Ignoring his orders, he decided to gather his army at Aquileia with thirty days worth of supplies and moved south into Macedonia. The Roman Senate learned of his actions and recalled him back to Rome. While Cassius Longinus was on his way back to Rome, he drove his army over the Alps, mercilessly pillaging Scordisci and other Celtic villages, carrying off thousands of people to be used as slaves. The people were so outraged that they took their case directly to the senate. The senate found that their evidence was indeed valid, and delivered to them various gifts as reparations.

After Cassius Longinus's return to Rome, he became a censor in 154 BCE. A stone theater, the first of its kind in Rome that he had constructed, was declared to be a violation of pudicitia by Publius Cornelius Scipio Nasica Corculum, and was destroyed upon orders from the senate.

Preceded by Gaius Popillius Laenas and Publius Aelius Ligus	Consul of the Roman Republic with Publius Licinius Crassus; 171 BC	Succeeded by Aulus Atilius Serranus and Aulus Hostilius Mancinus
