= Aulus Hostilius Mancinus =

Roman politician, consul in 170 BC

Aulus Hostilius Mancinus was consul of the Roman Republic, together with Aulus Atilius Serranus, in 170 BC. He had been an urban praetor in 180 BC. When he was consul he was given the command of the Third Macedonian War (171-168 BC) for that year.

The ancient Historian Livy did not write much about his campaign, which he thought was quite uneventful. He went to Epirus on the western coast of Greece to march to Thessaly, where the Roman troops were stationed. Epirus had just switched sides, going over to Perseus, the king of Macedon. Perseus was told about his presence there. However, he was delayed. If he had attacked at the passage of the river Lous there would have been no escape for the Romans. Aulus Hostilius was informed about these developments and changed his route. He left Epirus and sailed to Anticyra (on the north coast of the Gulf of Corinth in Boeotia) and marched to Thessaly. He was not very successful, being defeated in battle. Then he gave up his attempts first to force his way through Elimea, and then to secretly march through Thessaly and reach Macedon because Perseus anticipated all his moves.

He might have been the Hostilius who proposed the Lex Hostilia, which allowed prisoners of war or those who were absent on public business, and therefore could not attend a trial, and those who were under their guardianship to be represented in court. Previously one could bring a suit on behalf of another only when acting as a guardian.

== The Manilia Case ==
In an account by Aulus Gellius in Attic Nights, Aulus Hostilius Mancinus who at the time held the position of curule aedile attempted a forced entry into the brothel while he was engaging in revelry. Mancinus was then pelted with stones by the prostitute Manilia. Mancinus being injured from the stones brought his case to the tribunes, but was appealed as it "would not have been to her (Manilia's) advantage to admit him". This being a reference to Manilia's fear that Mancinus would destroy her property, subject her to rape or another form of physical assault, and/or murder her.

== See also ==
- Hostilia gens
- Lupanar

Preceded by Gaius Cassius Longinus and Publius Licinius Crassus	Consul of the Roman Republic with Aulus Atilius Serranus; 170 BC	Succeeded by Gnaeus Servilius Scipio and Quintus Marcius Philippus
