= Marcus Aurelius Scaurus =

Roman politician and general

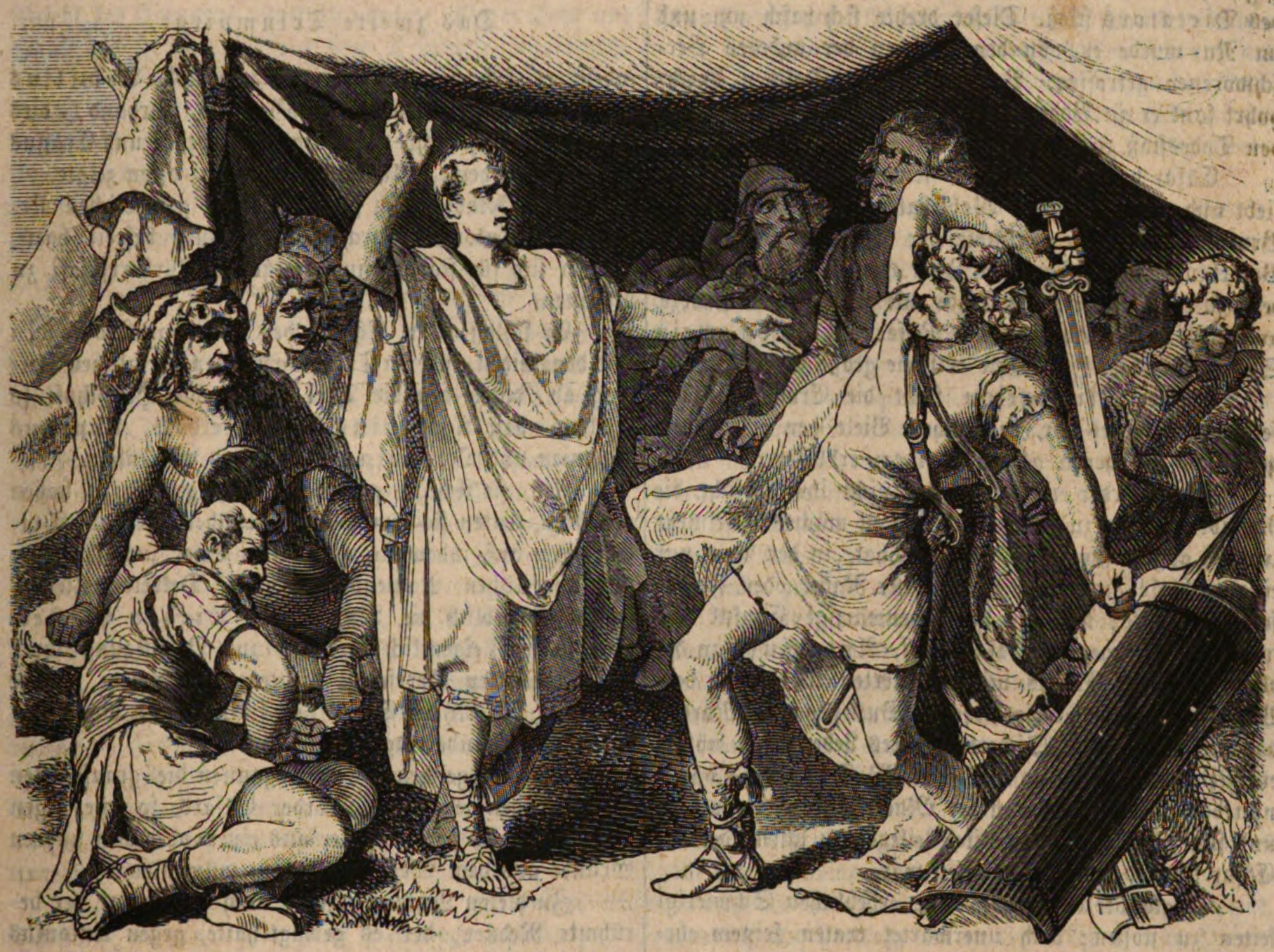
King Boiorix strikes down Marcus Aurelius Scaurus after the battle of Arausio, ca. 1871

Marcus Aurelius Scaurus (died 105 BC) was a Roman politician and general during the Cimbrian War. He was suffect consul in 108 BC. He had held the quaestorship around 118 BC and the praetorship by 111 BC, and after one of the consul-designates (a Lucius or Quintus Hortensius) was prosecuted and condemned, Scaurus was elected suffect consul for 108 BC. He may have played a role on the Mamilian commission and, speculatively, have secured the condemnation of the Hortensius into whose consulship he succeeded.

In 106 and 105 BC he was a legate under consul Quintus Servilius Caepio and then, the next year, consul Gnaeus Mallius Maximus for the purpose of fighting the Cimbri. There, he was captured and killed. According to the ancient sources, Scaurus was ordered to construct a cavalry camp around 30 miles north of the consular camp. The Battle of Arausio began with the Cimbri and Teutones advancing on the cavalry camp and overwhelming the Romans there. Aurelius was then brought before the Cimbrian chieftain Boiorix. Scaurus was not humbled by his capture and warned Boiorix to turn back before his people were destroyed by the Roman forces. The king of the Cimbri was indignant at this impudence and had Scaurus executed. According to Granius Licinianus, he could have escaped death but chose not to; in addition, he refused their request to help lead their forces, considering it shameful to outlive his defeated army.

== Bibliography ==
- Broughton, Thomas Robert Shannon (1951). The magistrates of the Roman republic. Vol. 1. New York: American Philological Association.
- Sumner, G V (1976). "Scaurus and the Mamilian inquisition". Phoenix. 30 (1): 73–75. doi:10.2307/1088024. ISSN 0031-8299. JSTOR 1088024.

Political offices
Preceded by Quintus Caecilius Metellus and Marcus Junius Silanus	Consul of the Roman Republic; 108 BC with Servius Sulpicius Galba	Succeeded by Lucius Cassius Longinus and Gaius Marius
