= Marcus Junius Silanus (consul 109 BC) =

Ancient Roman statesman and general

Marcus Junius D. f. D. n. Silanus was a member of the Junii Silani, a noble Roman family, who held the consulship in 109 BC.

== Biography ==
Because there are only a few and short sources about the history of the Roman Republic in the second half of the second century BC, we have to rely on suppositions as to which public offices Silanus held before his consulate. In 145 BC, he was perhaps one of the three magistrates who administered the Roman mint. He is probably identical with the tribune of the people Marcus Junius D. f., who introduced in 124 or 123 BC, a law against exploitative Roman governors (lex Iunia), which preceded the lex Acilia repetundarum of the tribune Manius Acilius Glabrio (123 or 122 BC). In 113 or 112 BC, Silanus was perhaps praetor in Spain.

In 109 BC, Silanus became the first member of his family, the Junii Silani, to be elected consul. He held this highest public office together with Quintus Caecilius Metellus Numidicus, who had to continue the war against Jugurtha, king of Numidia, whereas Silanus undertook to fight against the Cimbri. To increase the power of Rome, Silanus abolished exemptions from military service. Probably before their battle with the consul the traveling Cimbri had asked to be given a domicile on Roman territory, but the Senate had declined their request. (Note: This opinion holds Florus (Roman history 1.38.2), whereas the epitome of Livy (Livy, Ab Urbe Condita Libri, book 65) seems to have made a mistake with its assertion that the Cimbri asked for a place to settle only after their victory over Silanus.) Then Silanus attacked the Cimbri, but he was defeated in an uncertain location in Gallia Transalpina. (Note: Livy, epitome of book 65; Florus, Roman history 1.38.2-4; Marcus Velleius Paterculus, Compendium of Roman history 2.12.2; Asconius, p. 68 ed. Clark; Eutropius (Abridgement of Roman history 4.27.3) wrongly claims that Silanus had won the battle.)

In 104 BC, the tribune of the people Gnaeus Domitius Ahenobarbus put Silanus on trial for his military failure, but the former consul was acquitted.

== See also ==
- Junia (gens)

== Notes ==
Preceded by Marcus Minucius Rufus and Spurius Postumius Albinus	Consul of the Roman Republic with Quintus Caecilius Metellus Numidicus; 109 BC	Succeeded by Servius Sulpicius Galba and Marcus Aurelius Scaurus
