= Publius Cornelius Scipio Nasica (consul 111 BC) =

Roman consul in 111 BC

Publius Cornelius Scipio Nasica (Note: The agnomen Serapio found in a number of sources was only borne by his father, the consul of 138 BC. The confusion comes from a mistake in Pliny.) (c. 154 – 111 BC) was a politician of the Roman Republic. He belonged to the great patrician family of the Cornelii Scipiones, and was the son of the pontifex maximus Nasica Serapio, who famously murdered Tiberius Gracchus in 133 BC. Nasica was on track to a prestigious career like most of his ancestors, being praetor in 118 BC, but he died during his consulship in 111 BC.

== Family ==
He was the matrilineal great-grandson of Scipio Africanus. He was married to Caecilia Metella, daughter of Quintus Caecilius Metellus Macedonicus. He had two children: Publius Cornelius Scipio Nasica, who married a daughter of the famous orator Lucius Licinius Crassus, and a daughter who married Publius Cornelius Lentulus Marcellinus. His son was praetor in 93 BC and the father of Quintus Caecilius Metellus Pius Scipio Nasica.

== Bibliography ==
=== Ancient sources ===
- Gaius Plinius Secundus (Pliny the Elder), Historia Naturalis (Natural History).

=== Modern sources ===
- Henri Etcheto, Les Scipions. Famille et pouvoir à Rome à l’époque républicaine, Bordeaux, Ausonius Éditions, 2012.

Political offices
Preceded by M. Livius Drusus; L. Calpurnius Piso Caesoninus	Consul of the Roman Republic; 111 BC; With: L. Calpurnius Bestia	Succeeded by M. Minucius Rufus; Sp. Postumius Albinus
