= Publius Aelius Ligus =

2nd-century BC Roman consul

Publius Aelius Ligus was a consul of the Roman Republic in 172 BC, serving with fellow consul Gaius Popillius Laenas. Aelius Ligus probably was praetor in 175 BC.

The first plebeian college of consuls was in 172, which included Ligus. Both consuls were sent to Liguria.

Preceded by Lucius Postumius Albinus and Marcus Popillius Laenas	Consul of the Roman Republic with Gaius Popillius Laenas; 172 BC	Succeeded by Publius Licinius Crassus and Gaius Cassius Longinus
