= Quintus Caecilius Metellus Numidicus =

Ancient Roman statesman and general

Quintus Caecilius Metellus Numidicus (c. 155 BC – c. 91 BC) was an ancient Roman statesman and general. He was a leader of the Optimates, the conservative faction of the Roman Senate. He was a bitter political opponent of Gaius Marius. He was consul in 109 BC; in that capacity he commanded the Roman forces in Africa during the Jugurthine War. In 107 BC, he was displaced from his command by Marius. On his return he was granted a triumph and the agnomen Numidicus. He later became a censor, entering into exile in opposition to Marius. Metellus Numidicus enjoyed a reputation for integrity in an era when Roman politics was increasingly corrupt.

== Youth and cursus honorum ==
The son of Lucius Caecilius Metellus Calvus, in his youth he was sent to Athens where he studied under Carneades, celebrated philosopher and great master of oratory. He returned ostensibly cultured and with brilliant oratorical skills.

He was quaestor in 126 BC, tribune of the plebs in 121 BC, aedile in 118 BC, praetor in 115 BC, Governor of Sicily in 114 BC, and elected consul for 109 BC. Accused of extortion on leaving his governorship, the judges were so convinced of his good character that they dismissed the case against him unexamined.

Metellus was generous in his support of the arts, sponsoring his friend the poet Archias. Cicero spoke highly of Metellus' oratorical skills.

== Jugurthine War and aristocratic politics ==
When Metellus was consul (in 109 with Marcus Junius Silanus), he took command of the war in Numidia against Jugurtha. The war dragged out into a long and seemingly endless campaign as the Romans tried to inflict a decisive defeat on Jugurtha. Metellus gained just one important victory over Jugurtha at the Battle of the Muthul. Metellus, having his command prorogued stayed in Numidia for another year (108), laying siege to Jugurthine holdouts. His second-in-command, Marius, designing to displace Metellus as commander in Numidia, spread rumours that Metellus was dragging out the Jugurthine War in order to retain his command; Marius returned to Rome to seek election as Consul (for the year 107). Winning the election, he returned to Numidia to take control of the war. On his return to Rome, Metellus was surprised by the demonstrations of enthusiasm and recognition which he received from a faction of senators and the people who did not support Marius. He celebrated a triumph, acquiring the agnomen Numidicus, to Marius' irritation.

Metellus Numidicus became the main leader of the aristocratic faction, opposing the rapid political ascent of the populist Marius, who was favoured by the people because he finished the war in Numidia by the imprisonment and killing of Jugurtha (thanks to a stratagem of Sulla). Numidicus' conservative faction bitterly opposed Marius' recruitment of Romans without property.

Metellus Numidicus was elected censor in 102 BC in partnership with his cousin Gaius Caecilius Metellus Caprarius. During the censorship, he tried to expel Marius' ally Lucius Appuleius Saturninus from the Senate, but without success. Afterwards, Saturninus had his revenge when, having been elected tribune of the plebs, he and Marius proposed an agrarian law awarding land to Roman veterans, with an additional clause that obliged every senator to swear allegiance to the agrarian law, under penalty of expulsion from the Senate and a heavy fine. In the Senate, Marius first declared that he would never take the oath, in which Metellus seconded him; in the event, however, Marius and all other senators but Metellus took the oath. Rather than swear obedience to a law he opposed, Metellus Numidicus resigned his Senate seat and paid the corresponding fine. After leaving the Forum, he said to his friends:

To do harm is proper of the evil spirits; to do good without taking risks is proper of the ordinary spirits; the man of heart never ever deflects from what is fair and honest, never looking to rewards or to threats.

== Exile and later life ==
The tribune Saturninus proposed a law to exile Metellus Numidicus. Rather than face a confrontation between Saturninus' and his own supporters, who were prepared to defend him by force, Metellus departed into exile voluntarily, spending a year in Rhodes. He was accompanied into exile by a rhetorician, Lucius Aelius Praeconinus or Stilo, and pursued his study of philosophy while in Rhodes.

Following the death of Saturninus and an electoral reverse for the popular party, the new tribune, Quintus Calidius, proposed to allow Metellus' return to Rome in 99 BC. His son, Quintus Caecilius Metellus Pius gained the cognomen Pius thanks to his faithful efforts in support of Calidius' proposal, which duly carried. Metellus returned to Rome and to his houses at the Palatine Hill and the Via Tiburtina and lived there the rest of his days, intervening little in public affairs.

Cicero dubiously reports a rumour that Quintus Varius, the populist tribune of the plebs for 91 BC, ultimately poisoned Metellus – presumably Metellus Numidicus.

== See also ==
- Caecilia gens

== Notes ==
Preceded by Marcus Minucius Rufus; Spurius Postumius Albinus	Roman consul 109 BC; With: Marcus Junius Silanus	Succeeded by Servius Sulpicius Galba; Marcus Aurelius Scaurus
