= Marcus Fulvius Nobilior (consul 159 BC) =

Roman politician

Marcus Fulvius Nobilior was a Roman politician. He is not to be confused with his father, who was also called Marcus Fulvius Nobilior and who also served as consul.

He was tribune of the plebs 171 BC, curule aedile 166 BC, the year in which the Andria of Terence was performed, and consul 159 BC. Of the events of his consulship we have no records, but as the Fasti Triumphales assign him a triumph in the following year over the Eleates, a Ligurian people, he must have carried on war in Liguria.

Political offices
Preceded by Lucius Anicius Gallus and Marcus Cornelius Cethegus	Consul of the Roman Republic with Gnaeus Cornelius Dolabella; 159 BC	Succeeded by Marcus Aemilius Lepidus and Gaius Popillius Laenas
