= Publius Licinius Crassus (consul 171 BC) =

Roman consul

Publius Licinius Crassus (fl. 176 to 171 BC) was Roman consul for the year 171 BC, together with Gaius Cassius Longinus.

He was the son of Gaius Licinius Varus, possibly related to the Gaius Licinius Varus who was consul in 236 BC and who was still alive in 219 BC. Crassus's brother (probably his younger brother) was Gaius Licinius Crassus (consul 168 BC), and his nephew was Gaius Licinius Crassus, tribune of the plebs about 145 BC. However, his relationship to the consuls Licinius Varus and the Pontifex Maximus Publius Licinius Crassus is not known.

He was elected as praetor for 176 BC and assigned to the province of Hither Spain, but he excused himself from this duty by swearing an oath that his religious duties did not allow him to go.

Licinius adopted as his son and heir his sister Licinia's second son, Publius Licinius Crassus Dives Mucianus. This son was born a Mucius Scaevola, the son of another consul, Publius Mucius Scaevola, who attained the consulship in 175 BC, and who was the brother of another consul (174 BC) and son of a praetor who had died in the Second Punic War. The adoptive son, who also became a Pontifex Maximus, was a political ally of the Gracchi.

Preceded by Gaius Popillius Laenas and Publius Aelius Ligus	Consul of the Roman Republic with Gaius Cassius Longinus; 171 BC	Succeeded by Aulus Atilius Serranus and Aulus Hostilius Mancinus
