= Marcus Popillius Laenas (consul 173 BC) =

2nd-century BC Roman politician

Marcus Popillius Laenas was a Roman statesman.

He was praetor in 176 BC. He did not go to his province of Sardinia because he did not want to upset the success that the propraetor, Titus Aebutius, was enjoying. A new leader would need time to get acquainted with the situation and thus precious time would be lost.

He was consul for the year 173 BC, together with Lucius Postumius Albinus. Popillius went to his province and started fighting a tribe of Ligurians in Northern Italy, the Statielli. He fought a bloody battle at the town of Carystum, which came to a conclusion when Popillius sent in the cavalry that broke through the Ligurian lines. The cavalry then slew many of the men trying to flee to the city. The Romans killed 10,000 Ligurians and took 700 prisoner while losing 3,000 themselves. The remaining Ligurians, thinking that Popillius would be lenient, surrendered themselves. Popillius, however, destroyed their town and sold them and their property. The Senate was outraged when it heard of the treatment shown to a people who had not taken up arms against Rome and were attacked without provocation. The Senate demanded that Popillius restore the Ligurians to their homes and property. Popillius was himself outraged and refused to obey the Senate's commands. He returned to Rome and attacked the Senate for their actions. He claimed that it should have given him a thanksgiving instead of ordering him to return his spoils to his victims. Many senators again attacked him and his actions so Popillius returned to his province having failed to gain the support of the Senate. The following year, Popillius continued his aggressions against the Statielli killing 6,000 more in battle. His actions caused the rest of the Ligurians to rise up in arms. In response the Senate passed a decree that anyone hindering the return of the Statielli to their freedom would face trial. Popillius refused to return to Rome until a tribune of the plebs promised to bring him to trial in absentia. Popillius was tried, but the trial came to nothing due to the influence of his brother, the consul for the year, and other Popillii.

Despite his actions against the Ligurians, Popillius was later elected censor with Publius Cornelius Scipio Nasica Corculum in 159 BC.

Political offices
Preceded by Quintus Mucius Scaevola and Spurius Postumius Albinus Paullulus	Consul of the Roman Republic with Lucius Postumius Albinus; 173 BC	Succeeded by Gaius Popillius Laenas and Publius Aelius Ligus
