= Spurius Postumius Albinus (consul 110 BC) =

Roman senator and general

Spurius Postumius Albinus was a politician of ancient Rome, of patrician rank, of the 2nd century BC. He was consul in 110 BC, and was sent to Africa to carry on the war against Jugurtha, the king of Numidia. He made vigorous preparations for war, but when he reached the province he did not adopt any active measures, but allowed himself to be deceived by the artifices of Jugurtha, who constantly promised to surrender. Many persons supposed that his inactivity was intentional, and that Jugurtha had bought him over. When Albinus departed from Africa, he left his brother Aulus Postumius Albinus in command. After the defeat of the latter he returned to Numidia, but in consequence of the disorganized state of his army, he did not prosecute the war, and handed over the army in this condition, in the following year, to the consul Quintus Caecilius Metellus Numidicus. He was condemned by the Lex Mamilia, which was passed to punish all those who had been guilty of treasonable practices with Jugurtha.

He was probably the son of Spurius Postumius Albinus Magnus.

== See also ==
- Postumia gens

Preceded by P. Cornelius Scipio Nasica; Lucius Calpurnius Bestia	Roman consul 110 BC; With: Marcus Minucius Rufus	Succeeded by Q. Caecilius Metellus Numidicus; Marcus Junius Silanus
