= Aulus Postumius Albinus (consul 151 BC) =

Roman statesman and historian

Aulus Postumius Albinus was a statesman of the Roman Republic, notably consul in 151 BC. He was also a historian and wrote the Annals in Greek.

Apparently the son of Aulus Postumius Albinus Luscus, he was praetor in 155 BC, and consul in 151 BC with Lucius Licinius Lucullus. He and his colleague were thrown into prison by the tribunes for conducting the levies with too much severity. He was one of the ambassadors sent in 153 BC to make peace between Attalus and Prusias, and accompanied Lucius Mummius Achaicus into Greece in 146 BC as one of his legates. There was a statue erected to his honor on the isthmus.

Albinus was well acquainted with Greek literature, and wrote in that language a poem and a Roman history, the latter of which is mentioned by several ancient writers. Polybius speaks of him as a vain, arid lightheaded man, who disparaged his own people, and was indifferently devoted to the study of Greek literature. He relates a tale of him and Cato the Elder, who reproved Albinus sharply because in the preface to his history he begged the pardon of his readers, if he should make any mistakes in writing in a foreign language; Cato reminded him that he was not compelled to write at all, but that if he chose to write, he had no business to ask for the indulgence of his readers. This tale is also related by Aulus Gellius, Macrobius, Plutarch, and the Suda. Polybius also relates that he retreated to Thebes, when the battle was fought at Phocis, on the plea of indisposition, but afterwards wrote an account of it to the Roman Senate as if he had been present.

Cicero speaks with rather more respect of his literary merits; he calls him a "learned man" (doctus homo). Macrobius quotes a passage from the first book of the Annals of Albinus respecting Brutus, and as he uses the words of Albinus, it has been supposed that the Greek history may have been translated into Latin. A work of Albinus, on the arrival of Aeneas in Italy, is referred to by Servius, and the author of the work De Origine Gentis Romanae.

== See also ==
- Postumia gens

Preceded by Marcus Claudius Marcellus; Lucius Valerius Flaccus	Roman consul 151 BC; With: Lucius Licinius Lucullus	Succeeded by Titus Quinctius Flamininus; Marcus Acilius Balbus
