= Spurius Postumius Albinus Paullulus =

Roman senator

Spurius Postumius Albinus Paullulus was a politician of ancient Rome, of patrician rank, of the 2nd century BC. He was praetor in Sicily in 183 BC, and consul in 174 BC. He was probably a brother of Aulus Postumius Albinus Luscus and Lucius Postumius Albinus, and perhaps obtained the agnomen of "Paullulus" (Latin for "small" or "little") by being small of stature, to distinguish him more accurately from his two brothers.

== See also ==
- Postumia gens

Political offices
Preceded by M. Aemilius Lepidus; P. Mucius Scaevola	Roman consul 174 BC; With: Q. Mucius Scaevola	Succeeded by L. Postumius Albinus; M. Popillius Laenas
