= Marcus Aemilius Lepidus (consul 158 BC) =

2nd-century BC Roman consul

Marcus Aemilius Lepidus was a Roman consul for the year 158 BC, together with Gaius Popillius Laenas. He was a praetor in year 161 or earlier, and was possibly the presiding praetor when the Roman Senate was holding discussions on the dispute between Magnesia and Priene. He is mentioned in a context that suggests he was one of the Decemviri sacris faciundis, a priestly college (collegium) who oversaw the Sibylline Books in year 143.

Preceded by Gnaeus Cornelius Dolabella and Marcus Fulvius Nobilior	Consul of the Roman Republic with Gaius Popillius Laenas; 158 BC	Succeeded by Sextus Julius Caesar and Lucius Aurelius Orestes
