= Lucius Postumius Albinus (consul 154 BC) =

Roman consul in 154 BC

Lucius Postumius Albinus was a politician of ancient Rome, of patrician rank, of the 2nd century BC. He was curule aedile in 161 BC, and exhibited the Ludi Megalenses, at which Terence's play Eunuchus had debuted. He was consul in 154 BC, and died seven days after he had set out from Rome in order to go to his province. It was supposed that he was poisoned by his wife, Publilia.

He was also Flamen Martialis in 168 BC until his death.

== Family ==
He was apparently son of Spurius Postumius Albinus.

== See also ==
- Postumia gens

Political offices
Preceded by P. Cornelius Scipio Nasica; M. Claudius Marcellus	Roman consul 154 BC with Quintus Opimius	Succeeded by Manius Acilius Glabrio as suffect
