= Lucius Postumius Albinus (consul 173 BC) =

Roman statesman

Lucius Postumius Albinus was a statesman of the Roman Republic.

== Family ==
He is not to be confused with his relative (father or uncle?), Lucius Postumius Albinus, who was killed in 216 BC.

He was probably a brother of Spurius Postumius Albinus Paullulus and Aulus Postumius Albinus Luscus.

== Career ==
Albinus was praetor in 180 BC, and obtained the province of Hispania Ulterior. His command was prorogued in the following year. After conquering the Vaccaei and Lusitani, he returned to Rome in 178 BC, and was awarded a triumph on account of his victories.

He was consul in 173 BC, with Marcus Popillius Laenas. The war in Liguria was assigned to both consuls. Albinus, however, was first sent into Campania to separate the land of the state from that of private persons, because private land owners had slowly expanded their boundaries into public land. This business occupied him all the summer, so that he was unable to go into his province. He was the first Roman magistrate who put the Latin allies to any expense when a magistrate travelled through their territories. The festival of the Floralia, which had been discontinued, was restored in his consulship.

In 171 BC, he was one of the ambassadors sent to Masinissa and the Carthaginians in order to raise troops for the war against Perseus of Macedon. In 169 BC, he was an unsuccessful candidate for the censorship. He served under Lucius Aemilius Paullus in Macedonia in 168 BC, and commanded the second legion in the battle with Perseus. During the war, he was sent to plunder the town of Aeniae.

== See also ==
- Postumia gens

Preceded by Spurius Postumius Albinus Paullulus; Quintus Mucius Scaevola	Roman consul 173 BC with Marcus Popillius Laenas	Succeeded by Gaius Popillius Laenas; Publius Aelius Ligus
