= Roman Republican governors of Gaul =

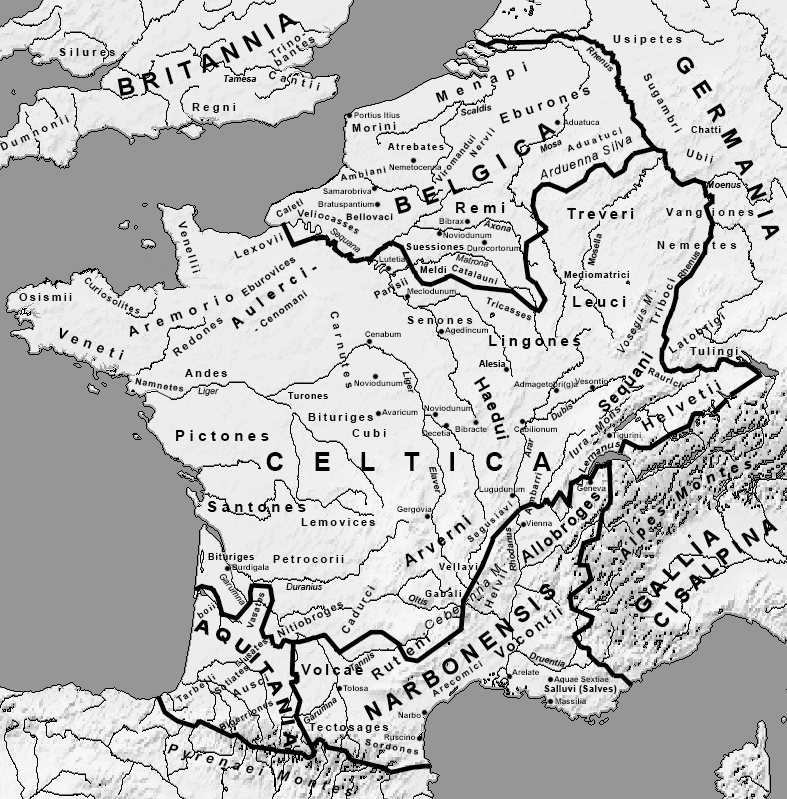
Map showing regions of Gaul in 58 BC

Roman Republican governors of Gaul were assigned to the province of Cisalpine Gaul (northern Italy) or to Transalpine Gaul, the Mediterranean region of present-day France also called the Narbonensis, though the latter term is sometimes reserved for a more strictly defined area administered from Narbonne (ancient Narbo). Latin Gallia can also refer in this period to greater Gaul independent of Roman control, covering the remainder of France, Belgium, and parts of the Netherlands and Switzerland, often distinguished as Gallia Comata and including regions also known as Celtica (Κελτική in Strabo and other Greek sources), Aquitania, Belgica, and Armorica (Brittany). To the Romans, Gallia was a vast and vague geographical entity distinguished by predominately Celtic inhabitants, with "Celticity" a matter of culture as much as speaking gallice ("in Celtic").

The Latin word provincia (plural provinciae) originally referred to a task assigned to an official or to a sphere of responsibility within which he was authorized to act, including a military command attached to a specified theater of operations. The assignment of a provincia defined geographically thus did not always imply annexation of the territory under Roman rule. Provincial administration as such originated in efforts to stabilize an area in the aftermath of war, and only later was the provincia a formal, pre-existing administrative division regularly assigned to promagistrates. The provincia of Gaul therefore began as a military command, at first defensive and later expansionist. Independent Gaul was invaded by Julius Caesar in the 50s BC and organized under Roman administration by Augustus; see Roman Gaul for Gallic provinces in the Imperial era.

== Early Republican wars with the Gauls ==
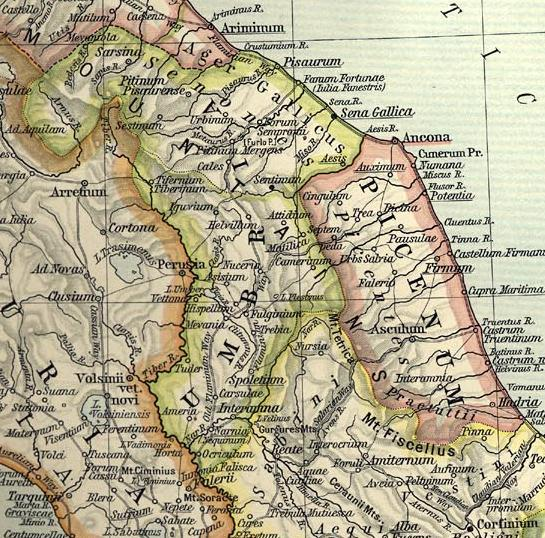
Map showing the ager Gallicus, where Rome established its first colony on territory previously held by Celts

The early history of Romano-Celtic relations begins during a period of Gallic expansionism on the Italian Peninsula, with the capture of Rome by Gauls in 390 BC (or more likely 387) and the suspiciously fortuitous rescue of the city by Camillus after the Romans had already surrendered. The Gauls who fought at the Battle of the Allia and captured Rome are most often identified as Senones. Over the next hundred years, the Gauls appear in classical sources as allies of the Etruscans and Samnites, but sometimes as invaders. Battles occur on Roman territory and on that held by Etruscans; by Italic peoples who later become Roman allies (socii) willingly or under compulsion; and by the Gauls themselves. The defeat of the Senonian stronghold Sena (or Senigallia) in 283 leads to nearly fifty years of mostly peaceful relations between Romans and Celts.

The accounts of these early military conflicts, written by Greek and Roman historians, are complicated by overlays of legend and moralizing. Although stereotypes of impetuous barbarians prevail, among the various historians the Gauls are sometimes portrayed as acting with honour, bravery, or respect, even in the face of Roman treachery. A priest named Fabius Dorsuo is said to have been allowed by the Gauls to carry out religious rituals during the siege of Rome; three Fabii occasioned outrage on both sides when they abused their responsibilities as ambassadors to the Gauls, and were even accused of having brought about the attack through their actions. Romans cast themselves as underdogs in hand-to-hand combat with physically superior Celts, to such an extent that guile or divine aid is seen as the most likely explanation when a Roman manages to win: T. Manlius earns the nickname (cognomen) Torquatus by outsmarting a Gaul in single combat and stripping him of his torque; M. Valerius Corvus got his cognomen when a divinely-sent raven (corvus) distracted his opponent. Regardless of factuality, these stories contributed to the fashioning of a distinctly Roman identity in relation to a Gallic "Other."

As the only foreign enemy to have taken the city, the Gauls represented a "Celtic threat" that loomed large in the Roman imagination for more than 300 years. Cicero could still malign Catiline in 63 BC with an accusation of plotting the overthrow of the government with the aid of Celtic armed forces. The fear and dread of inferiority engendered by the Gallic sack of Rome became enshrined in Roman foreign policy and myth as a virtually infinite quest to secure an ever-larger periphery; in his war against the Gauls and invasion of Celtic Britain, Caesar as proconsul could present himself as pursuing the old grudge to what Romans saw as literally the end of the world.

=== Dictatores and Celtic Italy ===
The following table shows Early Republican military commanders against the Gauls on the Italian peninsula. These men were granted imperium as consuls and praetors, the highest elected offices in Roman government, and also as dictatores. The dictatorship most likely originated as a military office; both Cicero and Livy thought that its purpose was to ensure strategic oversight and unified command in wartime — the dictator is he who gives the word (dictum). The Roman custom that a commander had to lay down arms outside the city limits (pomerium) before entering also suggests how the powers of the dictator originally might have been restricted within the civil realm; he could not, for instance, override the people's tribunes. The dictator was nominated by a consul, not elected, and he was expected to step aside when the job was done, with a limit of six months considered standard. In contrast to the annual magistracies set by the religio-astronomical calendar, this six-month term coincides with the usual length of the military campaigning season, given its seasonality in antiquity. In 332 (see table), for instance, a dictator was nominated specifically in anticipation of a Gallic war, which in the event never materialized. In 360, a dictator had been named to quell the Celtic crisis (Gallicus tumultus); one of the consuls that year had the specific task (provincia) of dealing with the Gallic alliance based in Tibur (modern-day Tivoli). Both commanders succeeded in their missions, but only the constitutionally elected consul was granted the honour of a triumph. The dictatores continued most often to have a military role into the Middle Republic, but when Sulla revived the office in the late 80s, it had fallen into disuse for more than a century, in part because a system had developed for assigning provincial commands with administrative oversight as a result of permanent annexations of territories.

==== Table of commanders in Italo-Gallic wars ====
Year	Commander	Office	Notes
390 (or 387)	M. Furius Camillus	dictator	contradictory versions exist for the sack of Rome by the Gauls; in one tradition Camillus snatches a victory from the jaws of defeat and celebrates a triumph; in another, the triumph is blocked by tribunes of the plebs
367	M. Furius Camillus	dictator	again awarded a triumph for defeating a Gallic force that had penetrated to the Anio in Latium
361	T. Quinctius Poenus Capitolinus Crispinus	dictator	celebrates a triumph over the Gauls for a battle near the Anio, also famously the occasion for T. Manlius to earn the cognomen Torquatus in single combat
360	Q. Servilius Ahala	dictator	defeated Gallic forces near the Colline Gate
360	Q. Poetelius Libo (Visolus or Balbus)	consul	followed up Ahala's victory at Tivoli (ancient Tibur), which had allied with the Gauls; earned a triumph
359	C. Sulpicius Peticus	dictator	triumphed with a major victory over Gauls who had reached Praeneste and Pedum
349	M. Furius Camillus	consul	victorious against the Gauls in Latium; on this occasion also M. Valerius Corvus received his cognomen by defeating a Gaul in single combat with the aid of a raven
332	M. Papirius Crassus	dictator	"appointed in fear of a Gallic war which proved unfounded"
295	Q. Fabius Maximus Rullianus	consul	co-commander (see following) at Sentinum against a force of Samnites, Gauls, and Etruscans; victorious after his colleague's death
295	P. Decius Mus	consul	joined his consular colleague (see preceding) at Sentinum; underwent the rite of devotio and sacrificed his body in battle
284	L. Caecilius Metellus Denter	praetor	defeated at the Battle of Arretium and killed by the Senones
284	M'. Curius Dentatus	praetor suffectus	succeeded Caecilius (preceding) and drove out the Gauls; a Roman colony was then planted at the Senonian town Sena in the occupied territory (ager Gallicus)
283	P. Cornelius Dolabella	consul	fought the Senones and ravaged their territory; wiped out a combined army of Gauls and Etruscans at the Battle of Lake Vadimo
283	Cn. Domitius Calvinus Maximus	consul	defeated the Senones in Etruria while Dolabella (see preceding) destroyed their homeland; perhaps celebrated a triumph
282	Q. Aemilius Papus	consul	defeated allied forces of Etruscans and Boii at the Battle of Lake Vadimo

== Annexing Cisalpine Gaul ==
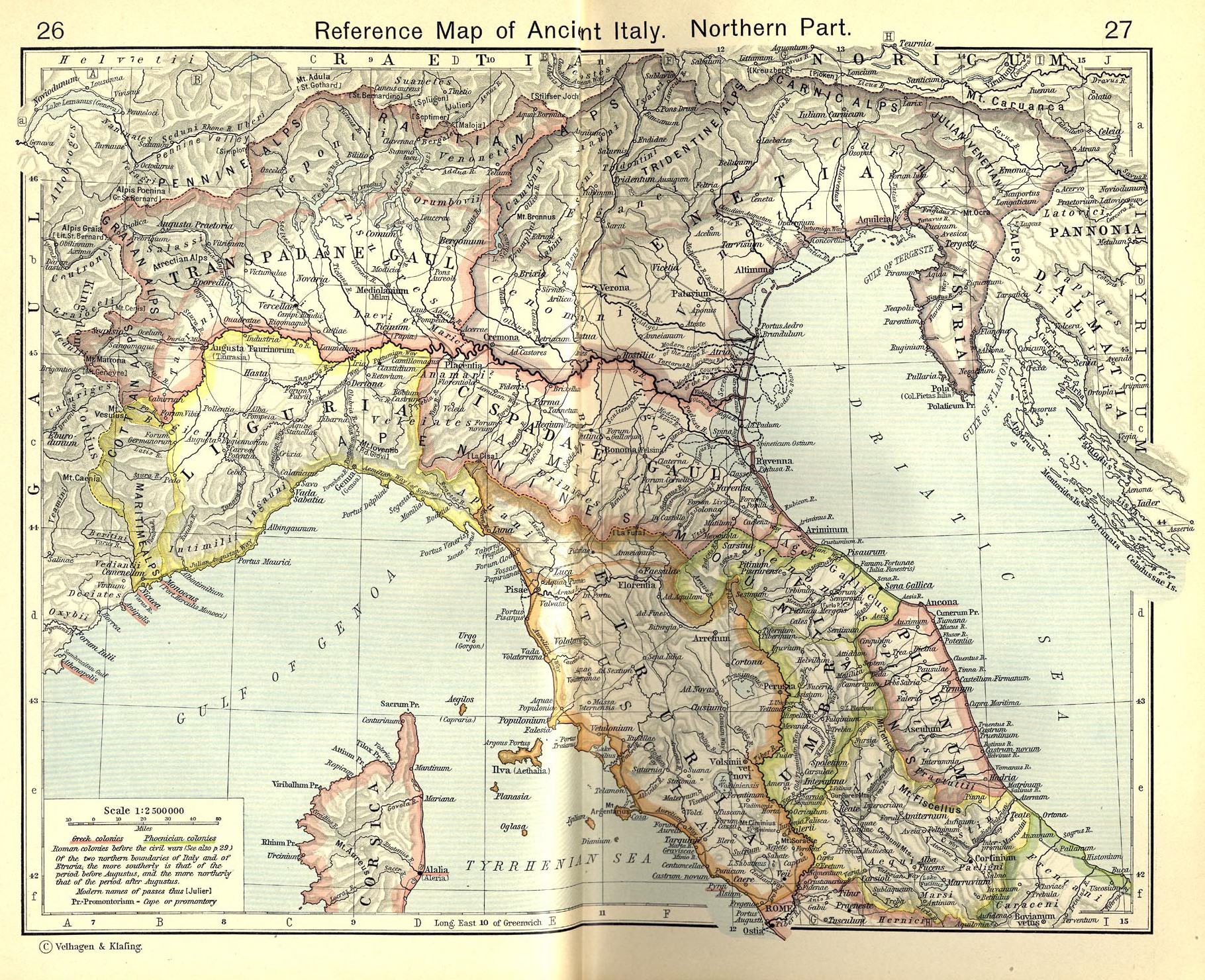
Map of Cisalpine Gaul showing (clockwise) Liguria, Transpadane Gaul, Venetic Gaul, and Cispadane Gaul, with the Ager Gallicus on the Adriatic coast

The Roman takeover of Cisalpine Gaul, or "Gaul on this side of the Alps," was a gradual process of long duration. "It was in Liguria, in the Celtic lands of the Po Valley, and in Venetia and Histria," notes Fergus Millar in his classic essay "The Political Character of the Classical Roman Republic, 200–151 B.C.," "that the Romans of this period exhibited a consistent and unremitting combination of imperialism, militarism, expansionism, and colonialism." Although sources for much of the period are sketchy, with the exception of Polybius, it becomes nearly impossible to argue that Rome acted only defensively: "Rome's wars in the north of the Italian peninsula"—not only against the Gauls, but the Etruscans and the Italic peoples—"were largely of her own devising." Provincial assignments and military actions involving Liguria, Venetia, and Istria (Histria) are included in the table below when related directly to Gaul.

=== The Ager Gallicus ===
The defeat of the Senones and Boii in the late 280s had brought the occupation of the Ager Gallicus along the Adriatic and the establishment of the first Roman colony in previously Gallic territory. The ager Gallicus, formerly in the possession of the Senones, was the land between Ariminum and Picenum, and was the first territory acquired by Rome in Cispadane Gaul.

Since that time, good relations between Rome and its Gallic neighbors had extended into a fifth decade. Polybius says that the lex Flaminia agraria of 232, which provided for the distribution of land in the Ager Gallicus to Roman citizens, threatened the existing peace with Gauls such as the Boii who bordered the ager. Ostensibly, this land had been ager publicus, that is, owned by the public; in practice, it was exploited for the benefit of the senatorial elite, who objected vehemently to the redistribution program.

The first Roman colonies in northern Italy were established in 218, but not until the end of the 2nd century could the Romans claim firm control of the region all the way to the Alps. After a series of decisive victories against Gauls and Ligurians in 200, provinciae pertaining to the Gauls take on an increasingly diplomatic and administrative character.

The province of Cisalpina at first was one of the military commands that might be assigned to the two consuls and six praetors before the territory had been annexed. A military command (imperium) was sometimes extended past a magistrate's one-year term of elected office for a year or two (see prorogatio); this prorogation allowed Rome to maintain continuity in ongoing military operations under experienced officers while still controlling and limiting the number of individuals authorized to hold command.

After major military operations had ceased, the commander's abilities as an administrator were put to the test. In the absence of an ideal leader who was both a bold and experienced general and a masterful diplomat and meticulous administrator, provincial governorships were liable to exploitive practices of self-enrichment that damaged the legitimacy of Roman rule. Governed peoples had recourse through Roman courts for unjust acts committed against them by their governors, but because the case had to be presented by a Roman citizen, usually a patronus with a family history of relations to the offended parties, these prosecutions were almost always politicized. As the number of citizens in a province increased, so too their connections to powerful families in Rome and the network of mutual obligations from which they could expect to benefit.

By the late Republic, Cisalpina of all the Roman provinces had the greatest number of citizens in its population; although the difficulties of travel might stand in the way of participating in Roman elections, northern Italy offered significant blocs of voters for Romans who cultivated their clients well. Popularist politicians in particular were associated with the cause of extending citizenship to the disenfranchised, and were accused by the conservative oligarchs of doing so merely to build loyalty and acquire votes. Toward the end of the Social War in 89, all free men in Cisalpine Gaul south of the Po River (Latin Padus)—that is, Cispadane Gaul, "Gaul on this side of the Po"—had become entitled to Roman citizenship.

Many Transpadanes, or residents of Cisalpina north of the Po, were Romans or held Latin rights, but the issue of blanket citizenship was not fully resolved until 49, with the passage of a law by Caesar. After 42 BC, Cisalpina was so thoroughly incorporated into the Roman system of government that it was no longer assigned as a province; the region was administered directly from Rome and by the same forms of municipal government as the rest of the Italian Peninsula.

In Latin sources before ca. 100 BC, Gallia is a flexible word that refers often to Cisalpine Gaul alone, but sometimes to Gaul as an indefinite totality and sometimes in a very limited sense to only Cispadane Gaul. The following table lists consuls, praetors and promagistrates—no dictatores are recorded against the Gauls—assigned to Gallia until 125 BC, when the administration of Cisalpina should be considered in light of actions in Transalpine Gaul. After 197 BC, commanders of praetorian rank are no longer assigned to Liguria or against the Gauls; military operations in northern Italy are usually conducted by both consuls during this period, or one consul if another war was being waged abroad.

==== Table of Gallic provinciae through 126 BC ====
Year	Commander	Office	Notes
238	Ti. Sempronius Gracchus	consul	campaigned in Liguria
238	P. Valerius Falto	consul	fought the Boii and other Gallic forces
236	P. Cornelius Lentulus Caudinus	consul	fought the Boii and other Gauls, some of whom may have been allies from Transalpina; later fought the Ligurians and celebrated a triumph
236	C. Licinius Varus	consul	fought against the Boii and other Gallic forces
233	Q. Fabius Maximus Verrucosus ("Cunctator")	consul	triumphed over the Ligurians and built a temple to Honos
230	M. Aemilius Barbula	consul	campaigned in Liguria with his consular colleague (following)
230	M. Junius Pera	consul	campaigned in Liguria with Aemilius Barbula
225	unknown	praetor	defeated by an army of Gauls in Etruria (see following)
225	L. Aemilius Papus	consul	first sent against Gauls at Ariminum, but after the defeat of the praetor's army (preceding) went to Etruria, where he and Atilius Regulus (following) joined against the allied Gallic forces at the Battle of Telamon and defeated them; celebrated a triumph De Galleis; ravaged the country of the Boii and Ligurians
225	C. Atilius Regulus	consul	joined Aemilius after campaigning in Sardinia; died at the Battle of Telamon.
224	T. Manlius Torquatus	consul	with his consular colleague Fulvius Flaccus obtained the surrender of the Boii and became the first Roman commanders to cross the Po, where they fought the Insubres
224	Q. Fulvius Flaccus	consul	acted jointly with Manlius Torquatus (see preceding)
223	C. Flaminius	consul	with his consular colleague (following) won major victory over the Insubres, with a triumph De Galleis celebrated by vote of the people when the senate refused his on religio-political grounds.
223	P. Furius Philus	consul	celebrated a triumph De Galleis et Liguribus
222	M. Claudius Marcellus	consul	with his consular colleague Scipio (following) fought the Insubres and Gaesates at Acerrae; followed a Gallic force across the Po and besieged Clastidium, where he won the spolia opima; rejoined Scipio in the capture of Mediolanum, thereby ending the war; celebrated a triumph over the Insubres and Germans, and vowed a temple (aedes) to Virtus
222	Cn. Cornelius Scipio Calvus	consul	with Marcellus, fought at Acerrae and Mediolanum
218	L. Manlius Vulso	praetor peregrinus	sent as military commander to Cisalpina and besieged by the Celtic Boii
218	M. Atilius Serranus	praetor urbanus	sent to Cisalpina to aid Manlius against the Boii
217	C. Flaminius	consul	a "dubious tradition" has Flaminius entering his consulship in Gaul; dies in the Battle of Lake Trasimene
217	C. Centenius	propraetor	sent to the aid of Flaminius but destroyed by Hannibal
215–214	M. Pomponius Matho	propraetor	in the ager Gallicus (Gallic territory)
213–211	P. Sempronius Tuditanus	praetor	captured the town of Atrinium; imperium prorogued in Gaul
210–211	C. Laetorius	praetor peregrinus	sent to Ariminum; propraetor in Gaul
209–208	Lucius Veturius Philo	praetor peregrinus	imperium in Cisalpina, then as propraetor in Gaul
207	M. Livius Salinator	consul	sent to Gaul against Hasdrubal, whom he defeated at the Battle of the Metaurus
207	C. Claudius Nero	consul	joined Livius at Sena
207	L. Porcius Licinus	praetor	sent with Livius Salinator
206	Q. Mamilius Turrinus	praetor peregrinus	later sent to Gaul to protect colonies at Cremona and Placentia
205–202	Sp. Lucretius	praetor	imperium prorogued in Gaul (Ariminum); reported Mago's landing in Liguria and fought against him with Livius Salinator; his mission in 203–202 was to rebuild Genoa
204	L. Scribonius Libo	praetor peregrinus	imperium in Gaul
204–203	M. Cornelius Cethegus	proconsul	imperium prorogued in Gaul; joined with Quinctilius (following) against Mago
203	P. Quinctilius Varus	praetor	fought Mago near Ariminum in Gaul
202	M. Sextius Sabinus	praetor	assigned to Gaul
200	L. Furius Purpurio	praetor	defeated a "serious" uprising of Gauls and Ligurians; celebrated a triumph over the Gauls
199	Cn. Baebius Tamphilus	praetor	assigned to Gaul; defeated by the Insubres at Ariminum and ordered back to Rome
199–198	L. Cornelius Lentulus	consul	assigned Italy as his province, but went to Gaul after the defeat of Baebius; command prorogued until he was relieved by the consular army of 197
198	C. Helvius	praetor	assigned to Gaul
197	C. Cornelius Cethegus	consul	both consuls were assigned Italy as their province; Cethegus fought against Gauls, celebrating a triumph over the Insubres and Cenomani
197	Q. Minucius Rufus	consul	fought against Gauls and Ligurians; denied a triumph by the senate for victories over the Boii and Ligurians, but celebrated a private one on the Alban Mount
196	L. Furius Purpurio	consul	both consuls assigned provinces in Italy; Furius fought against Gauls and Ligurians
196	M. Claudius Marcellus	consul	see preceding: fought the Boii and celebrated a triumph
195–194	L. Valerius Flaccus	consul	assigned Italy as province; warred against the Gauls; as proconsul won a victory over the Insubres at Mediolanum
195	P. Porcius Laeca	praetor	command created to launch an attack from the rear on the Ligurians
194	Ti. Sempronius Longus	consul	both consuls sent against the Boii and the Ligurians, with Sempronius taking the lead
194	P. Cornelius Scipio Africanus	consul	see preceding: Scipio returned to Rome to hold elections
193	L. Cornelius Merula	consul	assigned the province of Gaul; made war on the Boii but was refused a triumph
193–191	Q. Minucius Thermus	consul	based in Pisa; warred against the Ligurians with little success the first year; in 192 won a victory; remained proconsul in 191
192	L. Quinctius Flaminius	consul	assigned Italy, Gaul, and holding the elections; warred against the Ligurians
192–191	Cn. Domitius Ahenobarbus	consul	assigned provincia outside Italy in case of war with Antiochus, but Italy and the Gauls if not; fought against the Boii
191–190	P. Cornelius Scipio Nasica	consul	succeeded Domitius and defeated Boii; after dispute was allowed to triumph; as proconsul removed Boii from the territory taken from them
190–189	C. Laelius	consul	assigned Italy and held command in Gaul
189	L. Baebius Dives	praetor	assigned Hispania Ulterior, he was ambushed and wounded by Ligurians on his way; fled through Transalpina to Massilia but died there
188	M. Valerius Messalla	consul	assigned to Pisa and Liguria
188	C. Livius Salinator	consul	assigned to Gaul and founded Forum Livii
187	M. Furius Crassipes	praetor	illegally disarmed the Cenomani and consequently forced by Lepidus (following) to leave his province
187	M. Aemilius Lepidus	consul	restored arms to the Cenomani (see preceding) and built the Via Aemilia; both consuls were assigned to Liguria "which they actively ravaged"
187	C. Flaminius	consul	ravaged Liguria with Lepidus (preceding) and brought the Friniates and Apuani to subjection; built road from Bononia to Arretium
186	Sp. Postumius Albinus	consul	both consuls assigned Liguria but occupied with the investigation of the Bacchanalia coniurationes the whole year
186	Q. Marcius Philippus	consul	raided the territory of the Apuani and suffered heavy losses
185	Ap. Claudius Pulcher	consul	achieved a victory over the Ingauni of Liguria
185	M. Sempronius Tuditanus	consul	ravaged the territory of the Apuani in Liguria
184	P. Claudius Pulcher	consul	both consuls assigned Ligurian provincia
184–183	L. Porcius Licinus	consul	see preceding: as proconsul ordered by Marcellus (see following) to bring his legion to the new Gallic town in Venetia
183–181	M. Claudius Marcellus	consul	both consuls assigned to Liguria, but Marcellus went to Aquileia (Venetia) to oppose the settlement of Transalpine Gauls there; wanted to start an Istrian war; command prorogued with additions to his army; consulted senate when the Ligurians wanted to surrender to him instead of the consuls of 182 (see following); in 181, was supposed to yield to a successor but went to the aid of Paullus (below) in Liguria
183–182	Q. Fabius Labeo	consul	see preceding: command prorogued
183	L. Julius Caesar	praetor	given the task of preventing Transalpine Gauls from settling at Aquileia without resorting to war; further diplomatic efforts recorded by Livy, who says C. Valerius Flaccus as praetor peregrinus introduced Gallic envoys to the senate.
182–181	Cn. Baebius Tamphilus	consul	fought successfully in Liguria; returned to hold elections; went back to Liguria as proconsul (see also 199 above) but sent his troops to the praetor in Sardinia
182–181	L. Aemilius Paullus	consul	Liguria; continued as proconsul; was besieged but won a "signal victory"; the submission of the Inguani earned him a triumph
181–180	P. Cornelius Cethegus	consul	assigned to Liguria; with Baebius (following) forcibly resettled the Apuani and celebrated a triumph
181–180	M. Baebius Tamphilus	consul	assigned with Cornelius Cethegus to Liguria; returned to Rome to hold elections; imperium prorogued in Liguria; resettled the Apuani in Samnium and celebrated a triumph
181	Q. Petilius Spurinus	praetor urbanus	ordered to levy emergency troops against the Ligurians, and then to dismiss them
181	Q. Fabius Maximus	praetor peregrinus	assigned same task as Spurinus (see preceding); delivered the senate's response when Ligurians envoys asked for peace
181–180	Q. Fabius Buteo	praetor	assigned to Gallia Cisalpina; campaigned in Istria near Aquileia, prorogued as propraetor
180	A. Postumius Albinus Luscus	consul	assigned with his colleague (see following) to Liguria
180	C. Calpurnius Piso	consul	assigned to Liguria, but died from plague early in his term, with resulting repercussions for the Ligurian Apuani
180	Q. Fulvius Flaccus	suffect consul	assigned Ligurian province in place of Piso; deported 7,000 more Apuani to Samnium
179	Q. Fulvius Flaccus	consul	both consuls assigned to Liguria; Fulvius deported a number of Ligurians from the mountains to central Italy, and blocked the settlement of immigrants from Transalpine Gaul in Italy; celebrated a triumph
179	L. Manlius Acidinus Fulvianus	consul	brother by birth of Fulvius Flaccus, also assigned to Liguria (see preceding)
178–177	A. Manlius Vulso	consul	assigned the province of Gaul, which he used as a platform to launch an invasion of Istria; ousted from his camp by the Istri, then recovered it and defeated them; command prorogued and received submission of most of Istri
178–177	M. Junius Brutus	consul	assigned to Liguria, but after the defeat of the Istri joined his colleague at Aquileia; shared in accepting the submission of the Istri, but after a quarrel they were relieved of command by the consul Claudius (see 177 below)
178–177	Ti. Claudius Nero	praetor peregrinus	sent from Rome to assemble an army and succeed Brutus (preceding) at Pisa in Liguria; continued the following year as proconsul with one legion
177–176	C. Claudius Pulcher	consul	sent to Istria; after a dispute with his proconsular predecessors, he ended the Istrian War and forced king Aepulo to submit; put down a rebellion in Liguria and celebrated a triumph over Istri and Ligurians; after holding elections, went to Gaul to drive Ligurian raiders from Mutina; imperium as proconsul prorogued, succeeded in recapturing Mutina and turned toward suppressing Liguria
177	Cn. Cornelius Scipio (?)	praetor	assigned to Gaul; the identity of this praetor is uncertain
176	Q. Petillius Spurinus	consul	assigned to Liguria; died in battle there
176	C. Valerius Laevinus	suffect consul	made war in Liguria
175	P. Mucius Scaevola	consul	with consular colleague campaigned in Liguria and celebrated triumph
175	M. Aemilius Lepidus	consul	see preceding
173	L. Postumius Albinus	consul	assigned to Liguria, but sent to Campania to recover public land from private use
173–172	M. Popillius Laenas	consul	also assigned to Liguria, where he sold the Statelliates into slavery; he ignored attempts by the senate to reverse his action; continued as proconsul warring against Statelliates and refused to return until forced by two tribunes of the plebs; censured by the senate and prosecuted by the tribunes but escaped condemnation through the "connivance" of the presiding praetor
172	C. Popillius Laenas	consul	assigned to Liguria, where he upheld the injustices committed by his brother Marcus (see preceding), despite decrees by the senate and criticism
171	C. Cassius Longinus	consul	assigned to Italy but was active in Gaul; restrained by decree of the senate when he attempted to attack Macedonia through Illyria; served as a military tribune in 171 under the consul A. Hostilius Mancinus in Macedonia and Greece to avoid facing formal complaints from Gauls and others about his consular misdeeds
170	A. Atilius Serranus	consul	a quiet year in Liguria and Gaul
169–168	Cn. Servilius Caepio	consul	assigned Italy as his province and served in Gaul through the following year
168–167	C. Licinius Crassus	consul	assigned Italy as province and after Pydna went to Gaul, probably to relieve Servilius Caepio; imperium prorogued until sent as legate to Macedonia, at which time he was succeeded in Gaul by Aelius (following)
167	Q. Aelius Paetus	consul	held command in Gaul
167	M. Iunius Pennus	consul	held command in Liguria
166	M. Claudius Marcellus	consul	served against the Alpine Gauls and celebrated a triumph
166	C. Sulpicius Galus	consul	served against the Ligurians and celebrated a triumph
162	C. Marcius Figulus	consul	assigned to Gaul as his province
159–158	M. Fulvius Nobilior	consul	held command in Liguria, and as proconsul celebrated a triumph over the Eleate Ligurians
155	M. Claudius Marcellus	consul	(see 166 above); put down an uprising among the Apuan Ligurians and celebrated a triumph
154	Q. Opimius	consul	came to the aid of longstanding Roman ally Massilia (present-day Marseille) against the Transalpine Ligurian Oxybii and Deciatae; won a quick victory
146	Oppius (?)	praetor	a victory over the Gauls
135	Sex. Atilius Serranus	proconsul	assigned to Gaul, where he fixed the boundaries of Vicetia and Ateste

== Transalpine Gaul ==
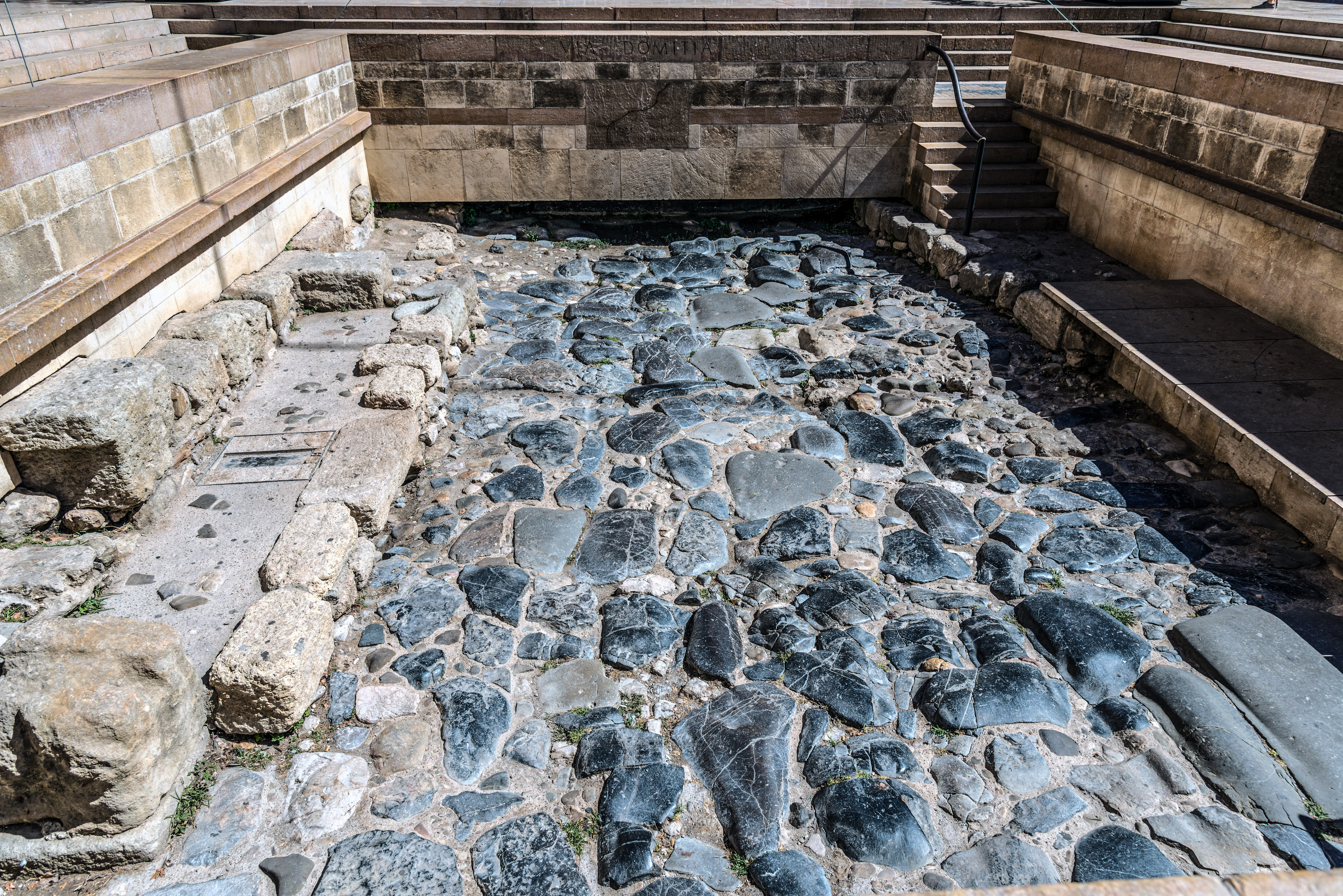
A section of the Via Domitia on display in modern Narbonne (ancient Narbo)

Gallia Transalpina at first could refer broadly to "Gaul on the other side of the Alps," but after the conquest of Mediterranean Gaul in the 120s BC came to specify the Roman province in the south (Provincia nostra, "our Province," hence Provence). Because the term Transalpina had a history of usage in the more general sense, the province was often called the Narbonensis, after the colonial headquarters in Narbonne. The establishment of the Transalpine province is usually dated to the military victories of Domitius Ahenobarbus and Quintus Fabius Maximus over the Arverni and Allobroges in the 120s, and the refounding of Narbo as a Roman colony in 118 BC. Evidence is scant, however, that Transalpina was assigned as a province over the next 15 years, until the Cimbrian invasions compelled the Romans to take action. There may have been no regular administration until after the victories of Gaius Marius in 101 BC. The historical record of Transalpine promagistracies continues to be sketchy until the 60s, with a few exceptions such as Valerius Flaccus's tenure ca. 85–81 BC, one of the longest known Gallic governorships.

During the Republic, the provinces of Cisalpina and Transalpina were governed sometimes jointly, sometimes separately; Caesar was allotted both provinces, and in his first five-year term divided his time between military campaigns in Transalpina and administrative duties in Cisalpina during the winter months. One factor in the Roman drive to control southern Gaul had been the desire for a secure land route to the Iberian Peninsula (Hispania), where the Celtiberians (Celtiberi) also spoke a form of Celtic or a language closely related to it, with at least some cultural similarities to the other Celts. Hispania Citerior and Hispania Ulterior had been administered as provinces since 197 BC as a result of the Second Punic War, which also had ignited the first direct if postponed Roman interest in southern Gaul; the first Roman colonies had also been established in Cisalpine Gaul during this time.

In the table following, when a governor is listed for Cisalpina only, he may also have governed Transalpina in the absence of another known official, and vice versa; at times, however, Hispania Citerior and Transalpina were governed jointly instead. Political and military factors determined whether and how these provincial assignments were combined, including shifting alliances among those governed, strategic considerations during the Social Wars and Roman civil wars, the availability of experienced administrators and commanders, and jockeying to maintain a balance of power among Roman oligarchs. Following the civil wars of the 40s, Narbonensis seems to refer specifically to the established province in southern Gaul, while Transalpina may include new territories claimed through Caesar's military campaigns in formerly independent Celtica and formally organized later by Augustus.

=== Table of Gallic governors 125–42 BC ===
Year	Province	Governor	Notes
125–123	Transalpina	M. Fulvius Flaccus	as consul sent to the aid of Massilia against the Ligures, Salluvii, and Vocontii; continued as proconsul for 124; triumphed 123
123–122	Transalpina	C. Sextius Calvinus	proconsul; after driving Gauls back from the coast east of Massilia, returned that territory to the Massiliots; founded Aquae Sextiae (Aix-en-Provence); triumphed over the Ligurians, Salluvi, and Vocontii
122–120	Transalpina	Cn. Domitius Ahenobarbus	as consul concluded the war against the Saluvii; engaged with the Arverni and Allobroges and continued war as proconsul; celebrated triumph over the Arverni in 120; began construction of Via Domitia
121–120	Transalpina	Q. Fabius Maximus	as consul joined Domitius in the Gallic war; defeated Allobroges, earning the cognomen Allobrogicus and building a monument at the site; defeated the Ruteni and Arverni, capturing their leader; as proconsul celebrated a triumph in 120 over Allobroges and the Arvernian king Bituitus
116	Cisalpina	L. Caecilius Metellus (?)	possibly the proconsul in Gaul who marked boundaries between Patavium and Ateste
115	"Gaul"	M. Aemilius Scaurus	celebrated a triumph over Gauls and Ligurians
109–108	"Gaul"	M. Junius Silanus	in 104 was tried and acquitted for incompetence for his defeat (as consul) by the Cimbri in Gaul
107	Transalpina	L. Cassius Longinus	as consul gained ground against the Volcae near Tolosa then was defeated and killed by the Tigurini
106–105	Transalpina	Q. Servilius Caepio	as consul attacked the Volcae Tectosages; at Tolosa seized their sacred treasury, "which disappeared under suspicious circumstances while being transported to Massilia for dispatch to Rome"; as proconsul refused to cooperate with Mallius (see following) and led his army into a disastrous defeat at the Battle of Arausio by the Cimbri and their allies; prosecuted by the tribune Norbanus (probably in 103) for losing his army, convicted, imprisoned, then freed by the tribune L. Reginus and went into exile at Smyrna
105	Transalpina	Cn. Mallius Maximus	poor cooperation with Caepio against the Cimbri and Teutoni led to a disastrous defeat for which he was tried and condemned to exile in 103
104	Transalpina	C. Flavius Fimbria	took over command in Gaul against the Cimbri and their allies; elected consul in absentia; actions not known, but was later prosecuted, supported by Scaurus, and acquitted
102–101	Transalpina	Gaius Marius	as consul (both years) defeated Teutoni and Ambrones in two battles near Aix in 102; elected consul in absentia; refused the triumph voted him in order to join Catulus (see following); defeated the Cimbri in 101 at the Battle of Vercellae; celebrated one triumph for both victories
102–101	Cisalpina	Q. Lutatius Catulus	held command in Italy against the Cimbri; retreated beyond the Po from fortified positions along the Adige in 102; joined forces with Marius in 101 as proconsul to defeat the Cimbri at Vercellae; triumphed with Marius; built Porticus Catuli with booty
95	Cisalpina	Q. Mucius Scaevola	triumph for repressing raiders vetoed (unusually) by his consular colleague L. Licinius Crassus; resigned his province
94	"Gaul," probably Cisalpina	L. Licinius Crassus	proconsul
91	Narbonensis	M. Porcius Cato	died in his province
85?–81	Cisalpina (?), Transalpina	C. Valerius Flaccus	Governed Hispania Citerior and possibly Ulterior from 92; was "firmly installed" in Transalpina by 85 if not earlier, without necessarily surrendering Hispania; possibly also governor of Cisalpina; see his Life and career
78	Transalpina	L. Manlius	defeated in battles against the forces of Quintus Sertorius within his province and in Spain
77	Transalpina	M. Aemilius Lepidus	assigned as proconsul, but may not have entered the province before he died in Sardinia
74–73	Cisalpina	C. Aurelius Cotta	died at the end of 74 or early in 73 as he prepared to celebrate a triumph
77?/74?–74?/72?	Transalpina	M. Fonteius	governor for three years, probably pro praetore, with arguable dating; accused by the Gauls of extortion but defended successfully by Cicero
72	Cisalpina	C. Cassius Longinus	proconsul defeated by Spartacus at Mutina
67–65	Cisalpina, Transalpina	C. Calpurnius Piso	assigned proconsular command of both Gauls to quash an uprising among the Allobroges; accused in 63 for extortion among the Transpadanes
64– early 63	Transalpina	L. Licinius Murena	returned to Rome early to run for consul and left his brother in command, with Clodius Pulcher on staff
62	Cisalpina	Q. Caecilius Metellus Celer	proconsul
62–60	Transalpina	C. Pomptinus	quashed another uprising among the Allobroges; in 59 Vatinius as tribune blocked attempts to have these victories in Gaul honored with a triumph, which he was not to celebrate till 54
60	Transalpina	Q. Caecilius Metellus Celer	died in Rome before assuming his proconsular assignment
59	Cisalpina	L. Afranius	assigned proconsular province, but may not have assumed post
58–47	Transalpina, Cisalpina	C. Julius Caesar	five-year assignment in a Lex Vatinia (see Pomptinus above), renewed in 55 by the Lex Pompeia Licinia; exact end date established by the lex of 55 is debated, but at some point in 49 his refusal to give up his province was unquestionably beyond the law
49	Cisalpina	M. Considius Nonianus	assigned as propraetor to succeed Caesar
49–48/47	Cisalpina	M. Calidius	Caesar sent him, probably as legate, at the start of the civil war.
49	Transalpina	L. Domitius Ahenobarbus	assigned to succeed Caesar as proconsul, but captured by Caesar during civil war
48–46	Transalpina	D. Junius Brutus Albinus	put in command by Caesar, probably as legatus pro praetore; in 46 stopped a Bellovac "uprising" in Belgic Gaul, which was not formally organized as a province at the time; D. Brutus had served with distinction under Caesar during the Gallic Wars
46– spring 45	Cisalpina	M. Junius Brutus	put in command by Caesar, probably as legatus pro praetore
45	Transalpina	A. Hirtius	specifically including Narbonensis
45–early 44	Cisalpina	C. Vibius Pansa Caetronianus	
44–43	Narbonensis, Hispania Citerior	M. Aemilius Lepidus	proconsul appointed by Caesar
44–43	Transalpina	L. Munatius Plancus	appointed by Caesar as proconsul, excluding the Narbonensis
44–43	Cisalpina	D. Junius Brutus Albinus	(see 48–46 above): appointed proconsul by Caesar prior to assassination (in which D. Brutus took part), assumed post in early April and defended it with troops; acclaimed imperator for victories against Alpine peoples; defended his province against Marcus Antonius; besieged that winter in Mutina; arrested on behalf of Antonius and executed by a Celtic leader
44–42	Cisalpina, Transalpina	Marcus Antonius	proconsul as legislated 1 June 44, probably for a five-year term

== Triumviral years ==
In the tumultuous period following Caesar's death, during the ascendancy of the Second Triumvirate, Gaul was acted upon by various commanders, until M. Vipsanius Agrippa arrived as proconsul in 39 to quell unrest. Scholars have paid relatively scant attention to the question of why Gaul failed to take advantage of Rome's disarray during the civil wars of the 40s and 30s to revolt in toto; it is sometimes assumed that the population was too decimated to take a stand, but the numbers in so far as they are known make this unlikely. In 57, for instance, Caesar had reported that the Nervii had 50,000 men of fighting age; he supposed that only 500 survived the Battle of the Sabis, but five years later they were able to provide a force of 5,000 men. Although the figures may be unreliable in the absolute, they indicate the resilience of the population. In 52, after the surrender of the pan-Gallic army at Alesia, Caesar had granted amnesty to the armies of both the Arverni and Aedui, each of which he estimated at 30,000 men, and sent them home. After the failure of Vercingetorix's strategy of massing allied forces, the surviving Gallic leaders had continued to wage a guerrilla war with some success and hope of attrition, until Marcus Antonius (Mark Antony) came to an arrangement with the last Celtic king known to retain his independence, Commius of the Atrebates, who had led the relief forces at Alesia. Over the course of the following two decades, Gallic losses in the 50s would have been replaced by the maturation of the male population, while available Roman forces were largely occupied by fighting each other. The Gauls may have imagined that the Romans would weaken themselves in civil war to such an extent that a rebellion was moot or not worth the trouble; Caesar reports that the Gauls kept themselves informed about political events in Rome that might affect them.

In 44 BC, Antony was the proconsul assigned to both Cisalpina and Transalpina; his ability to come to an understanding with the Gauls, as demonstrated by his arrangements with Commius, is further indicated by the willingness of a Sequanian leader to execute Decimus Brutus at his behest. This Brutus had served in Gaul under Caesar from 56 (or earlier). Although his experience in Gallic relations exceeded that of his peer Antony, whose earliest appearance in Caesar's account of the war is around the time of the Battle of Alesia, Celtic antipathy may have been spurred by Brutus's betrayal of Caesar, given the high value Celts placed on loyalty to their sworn leaders.

Broughton lists no Gallic governors after Agrippa through 31, the year with which The Magistrates of the Roman Republic concludes. Augustus began to reorganize Transalpine Gaul with its newly conquered territories into administrative regions in 27 BC.

== See also ==
- Lists of ancient Roman governors

== Selected bibliography ==
- A.L.F. Rivet, Gallia Narbonensis: Southern France in Roman Times (London, 1988)
- Charles Ebel, Transalpine Gaul: The Emergence of a Roman Province (Brill, 1976)
- T. Corey Brennan, The Praetorship in the Roman Republic (Oxford University Press, 2000)
- Andrew Lintott, The Constitution of the Roman Republic (Oxford University Press, 1999)
- Unless otherwise noted, the sources for promagistracies in Gaul and their dates is T.R.S. Broughton, The Magistrates of the Roman Republic (New York: American Philological Association, 1951, 1986), vols. 1–3, abbreviated MRR^{1}, MRR^{2} and MRR^{3}.
