= Tiberius Sempronius Gracchus (consul 177 BC) =

Roman politician and general

- Born: c. 220 BC
- Died: 154 BC
- Office: Tribune of the plebs (187 BC); Curule aedile (182 BC); Consul (177, 163 BC); Censor (169 BC)
- Spouse: Cornelia
- Children: Tiberius, Gaius, and Sempronia

Tiberius Sempronius Gracchus (c. 220 BC – 154 BC) was a Roman politician and general of the 2nd century BC. He served two consulships, one in 177 and one 163 BC, and was awarded two triumphs. He was also the father of the two famous Gracchi brothers: Tiberius and Gaius.

During his tribunate in 187 or 184 BC, he interceded to save Scipio Africanus or Scipio Asiagenes from prosecution or prison, feeling that their services to the republic outweighed any alleged wrongdoing. He later married Africanus' daughter, Cornelia, after Africanus' death. A few years later, Tiberius was elected praetor and prorogued pro consule to Spain; he won victories there for which he was awarded a triumph. After his first consulship in 177 BC, he was assigned to Sardinia and on his return triumphed for the second time. In 169 BC, he was elected to the censorship and began construction of the Basilica Sempronia in the forum; he later won a second consulship in 163 BC.

== Early life and career ==
Tiberius was of plebeian status and was a member of the well-connected gens Sempronia, a family of ancient Rome. Tiberius may be the same person as the homonymous augur who served from 204 to 174 BC; his grandfather, or possibly father, was the man of the same name who was consul in 215 and 213 BC.

Not much is known of his early life. He may have been made an augur in 204 BC – though the augur may in fact be a separate homonymous individual – in place of Marcus Pomponius Matho. He did, however, serve in the Roman army: while serving with the Scipios in Asia, he was sent as an envoy to Philip V of Macedon to negotiate safe passage to the Hellespont. He may have been sent a few years later, in 185 BC, to adjudicate a dispute between Macedon and its Greek neighbours to the south over disputed territory.

Tiberius served as tribune of the plebs in 184 BC (or possibly in 187 BC); he is recorded as having saved Scipio Africanus from prosecution and Lucius Cornelius Scipio Asiagenes from prison by interposing his veto. Accounts of the "trial of the Scipios" differ; the plurality of accounts indicate a suit was brought only against Asiagenes on charges of corruption during the Antiochene war. Tiberius was no friend nor political ally to the Scipios, but felt that the general's services to Rome merited his release from the threat of trial. Some of the ancient sources, most especially Livy and Valerius Maximus, claim that Africanus betrothed his daughter Cornelia to Gracchus in gratitude. Plutarch, referencing Polybius, more credibly relates that the betrothal occurred after Africanus' death, with his heirs making the match. The marriage itself has been variously dated; it likely took place around 181 BC, with other possibilities at 170 and 164 BC.

His next office was that of curule aedile in 182 BC, during which he put on such lavish games that the senate resolved a cap on their expenses to curb their costs on Rome's Italian allies and its provinces.

== Military and political career ==
Tiberius was elected praetor for 180 BC, a post that required men to be at least 40 years of age according to the cursus honorum, which brings estimates of his birth to around 220 BC. Following his praetorship, he took up the governorship of Hispania Citerior in 179 BC after successfully objecting to his predecessor's attempt to have the army in Hispania recalled for a triumph on the grounds that the task was not yet done. He served there pro consule from 179 to 178 BC. Rome had been fighting a prolonged and continuous conflict in Iberia since the mid-190s BC.

While governor and in conjunction with the other Spanish governor, Lucius Postumius Albinus, he campaigned successfully against the Celtiberians, Lusitanians, and other hostile groups while negotiating treaties to ensure a prolonged peace. In the coming two decades, Roman expansion in Spain also took a lower priority as the senate focused Rome's military resources on Macedonia. The Gracchan agreements seem to have mainly been related to tribute arrangements; the details are largely lost. During his governorship of Hispania Citerior, he also founded the city of Grachurris (Alfaro – La Rioja) in 178 BC, on the river Ebro, becoming the first Roman to name a city after himself. Gracchus claimed to have destroyed three hundred cities during his campaigns in Spain (almost certainly an exaggeration). Upon his return, the senate awarded him a triumph "over Lusitania and Spain" where he and his colleague Albinus presented some 60 thousand pounds of silver.

In 177 BC, he was elected consul with Gaius Claudius Pulcher. He was posted to Sardinia, where he suppressed a revolt assisted by propraetor Titus Aebutius Parrus. He waged two "ruthless" campaigns, fighting the Ilienses and the Balari, forcing their submission. At the close of 175 BC, he returned to Rome, claiming he had killed and captured some 80 thousand Sardinians, and triumphed for the second time in 175 BC.

He was elected censor starting in 169 BC with his former consular colleague Gaius Claudius Pulcher. The censors helped raise men for the war against Macedon, and was so strict that it provoked a prosecution of his colleague Claudius. Claudius was narrowly acquitted with Gracchus' help. Supposedly, during his censorship, citizens extinguished their lights when Gracchus passed at night from fear of being thought overly indulgent. While censor in 168 BC, he restricted the votes of freedmen by registering all of them into just one of the urban tribes over the objection of his colleague Claudius. He also had the basilica Sempronia constructed in the Roman forum; the request of theirs, however, to see the building programme to completion was vetoed.

After his censorship, in 165 BC, Gracchus was dispatched as head of an embassy to various eastern kingdoms on a mission to investigate the attitudes thereof to Rome, reporting that all had favourable views of the Romans.

In 163 BC, Tiberius was again elected consul. When performing the auspices when conducting the consular elections for 162 BC, he committed a procedural error: after observing a negative omen, he crossed the pomerium to consult the senate and therefore relinquished the auspicia militiae needed to hold the election. He discovered this procedural error after his successors had taken office and he had arrived in Sardinia for his promagistracy, whereon he reported it to the senate. The consuls were forced to resign, one of which was his brother-in-law Publius Cornelius Scipio Nasica Corculum, husband of his wife's elder sister.

== Later life ==
He returned to Rome late in 162 BC (the first year of his promagistracy) to become an ambassador to examine conditions in Greece and Asia, and to settle various disputes with neighbouring Hellenistic kingdoms.

It is not clear if the loss of Scipio Nasica's first consulship (he later served as consul in 155 BC) led to strain or dissension between the brothers-in-law (Nasica was elected censor in 159 BC and again consul in 155 BC); however, their sons fell out politically some thirty years later with fatal consequences.

== Family ==
Tiberius married the eighteen-year-old Cornelia in 172 BC when he was about 48 years old. Despite the age difference, the marriage was happy and fruitful. She had twelve children with him. Three children survived to adulthood: a daughter, Sempronia (who was betrothed to her mother's first cousin Scipio Aemilianus), Tiberius Gracchus, and Gaius Gracchus.

Tiberius is said to have loved his wife dearly (see anecdote below). Tiberius and other Romans also thought very highly of Cornelia as a wife and mother. When Tiberius died, Cornelia took charge of his property and the household. She refused to remarry, although she was offered marriage by several Roman senators and by the Egyptian king Ptolemy VIII; Cornelia devoted the rest of her life to the education and upbringing of her sons.

Plutarch's life of Tiberius Gracchus (son of this Tiberius) narrates that the father demonstrated his love for his much younger wife in an unusual manner:

There is a story told, that he once found in his bedchamber a couple of snakes, and that the soothsayers, being consulted concerning the prodigy, advised, that he should neither kill them both nor let them both escape; adding, that if the male serpent was killed, Tiberius should die, and if the female, Cornelia. And that, therefore, Tiberius, who extremely loved his wife, and thought, besides, that it was much more his part, who was an old man, to die, than it was hers, who as yet was but a young woman, killed the male serpent, and let the female escape; and soon after himself died, leaving behind him twelve children borne to him by Cornelia.

Tiberius's own life and achievement are obscured, however, by the reputation of his widow and the deeds of his two surviving sons. The elder son Tiberius would have been in his youth, while the younger son Gaius was a mere infant at his death. Both sons were apparently raised as much in the household of their kinsman and brother-in-law Scipio Aemilianus as in their own house and would have been influenced and educated by men such as the historian Polybius, the philosopher Panaetius, the satirist Lucilius, and the slave-turned-playwright Terence, as well as Scipio's own circle of friends from the Roman elite.

== See also ==
- Sempronia gens
- Tiberius Gracchus, his elder son
- Gaius Gracchus, his younger son

== Notes ==
Political offices
Preceded by M. Junius Brutus; A. Manlius Vulso	Roman consul 177 BC; With: Gaius Claudius Pulcher	Succeeded by Cn. Cornelius Scipio Hispallus; Q. Petillius Spurinus
Preceded by Q. Fulvius Flaccus; A. Postumius Albinus Luscus	Roman censor 169–168 BC; With: Gaius Claudius Pulcher	Succeeded by L. Aemilius Paullus Macedonicus; Q. Marcius Philippus
Preceded by A. Manlius Torquatus; Q. Cassius Longinus	Roman consul 163 BC; With: Manius Juventius Thalna	Succeeded by P. Cornelius Scipio Nasica; C. Marcius Figulus
