= Quintus Fulvius Flaccus (consul 179 BC) =

Roman general and statesman (died 172 BC)

Quintus Fulvius Flaccus (died 172 BC) was a plebeian consul of the Roman Republic in 179 BC. Because of his successes in Spain and Liguria, he celebrated two triumphs. Although his political career was a success, he was plagued by controversy and suffered a mental breakdown that culminated in suicide.

According to his recorded filiation "Q. f. M. n.", Fulvius was the son of Quintus Fulvius Flaccus, four times consul beginning in 237 BC, and grandson of Marcus Fulvius Flaccus, consul of 264 BC.

== Early career ==
As curule aedile in 184 BC, Fulvius Flaccus created a furor by actively campaigning for the praetorship vacated by C. Decimius Flaccus, who died early in his term. The holding of two magistracies in a single year was prohibited, and Fulvius further violated decorum by campaigning sine toga candida ("without a white toga"); as a magistrate, he was required to wear the toga praetexta and not the pure white garment of a candidate. The Roman Senate was so opposed to Fulvius' holding another curule office that it refused to hold elections.

As praetor in Hispania Ulterior in 182, he waged war successfully against the Celtiberians, capturing Urbicua. His imperium was extended for two years as propraetor. In 180, he requested but was denied permission to bring his army home. He won another victory against the Celtiberi and earned a triumph.

== Consul and censor ==
Fulvius was consul in 179; his colleague was L. Manlius Acidinus Fulvianus, his brother by birth. They were assigned the province of Liguria. During this period, many Ligures were being forcibly moved from their land and relocated to central Italy; Fulvius effected the resettlement of Ligurians from the mountains. He also helped block immigrants from Transalpine Gaul from settling in northern Italy. For these activities he was awarded a triumph. He fulfilled a vow for his victories in Spain by building a temple and holding games. His building of the temple was to prove fateful.

Fulvius was censor in 174 BC with A. Postumius Albinus Luscus. They expelled nine members from the senate, including Fulvius's own brother, and downgraded the rank of several knights. They named M. Aemilius Lepidus princeps senatus.

The censors also carried out an extensive building program in Rome. Fulvius undertook additional projects in Pisaurum, Fundi, Potentia, and Sinuessa. The Augustan historian Livy says that when Fulvius built his temple to Fortuna Equestris ("Equestrian Luck"), he stripped the marble tiles for it from a temple of Juno Lacinia. The Temple of Fortuna Equestris was dedicated in 173.

== A 'vile death' ==
In 180, Fulvius had been admitted to the College of Pontiffs, a lifetime appointment. Livy notes his priesthood in reporting the vile manner of his death (foeda morte).

In 172 BC, Fulvius had two sons serving in Illyricum; he received word that one had died and the other was suffering from a life-threatening illness. The next morning, the household slaves found him hanging by a noose in his bedroom. Although Romans regarded suicide as honorable in some circumstances, Fulvius's was seen as evidence of his mental instability: Livy says that "grief and fear overwhelmed his mind" (obruit animum luctus metusque); rumor had it that the wrath of Juno Lacinia had driven him mad.

The senate, according to Valerius Maximus, then had the marble tiles returned to the original temple to undo the deed of an impius ("consciously irreligious") man.

The Via Fulvia is attributed to him, but doubtfully. This Q. Fulvius Flaccus should not be identified with the man of the same name who was suffect consul in 180 BC.

== Sources ==
- Dates, offices, and citations of ancient sources by T.R.S. Broughton, The Magistrates of the Roman Republic (American Philological Association, 1951, 1986), vol. 1, pp. 375, 377 (note 1), 382, 385, 387 (note 3), 389, 390, 391–392, 404; vol. 2 (1952), p. 568.

Political offices
Preceded by A. Postumius Albinus Luscus; Q. Fulvius Flaccus	Roman consul 179 BC with L. Manlius Acidinus Fulvianus	Succeeded by M. Junius Brutus; A. Manlius Vulso
Preceded by M. Aemilius Lepidus; M. Fulvius Nobilior	Roman censor 174 BC with A. Postumius Albinus Luscus	Succeeded by G. Claudius Pulcher; Ti. Sempronius Gracchus
