= Livius Salinator =

Livius Salinator may refer to:

- Marcus Livius Salinator (254 BC-ca. 204 BC), Roman consul who fought in both the First Punic wars and Second Punic wars
- Gaius Livius Salinator, son of the above, Roman consul, said to have founded the city of Forum Livii
