= Marcus Fulvius Nobilior (consul 189 BC) =

Roman general

Marcus Fulvius Nobilior was a Roman general.

He started his political career as curule aedile in 195 BC. When he was praetor (193 BC) he served with distinction in Spain, and as consul in 189 BC he completely broke the power of the Aetolian League. On his return to Rome, Nobilior celebrated a triumph (of which full details are given by Livy) remarkable for the magnificence of the spoils exhibited. On his Aetolian campaign he was accompanied by the poet Ennius, who made the capture of Ambracia, at which he was present, the subject of one of his plays. For this Nobilior was strongly opposed by Cato the Censor, on the ground that he had compromised his dignity as a Roman general. In 179 BC he was appointed censor together with Marcus Aemilius Lepidus.

He restored the temple of Hercules and the Muses in the Circus Flaminius, placed in it a list of Fasti drawn up by himself, and endeavoured to make the Roman calendar more generally known.

He was a great enthusiast for Greek art and culture, and introduced many of its masterpieces into Rome, amongst them the picture of the Muses by Zeuxis from Ambracia.

Fulvius was the grandson of Servius Fulvius Paetinus Nobilior (consul in 255 BC). He was named for his father. He had two sons, both of whom obtained the consulship: Marcus Fulvius Nobilior (in 159 BC) and Quintus Fulvius Nobilior (in 153 BC).

Political offices
Preceded by Lucius Cornelius Scipio Asiagenes; Gaius Laelius	Roman consul 189 BC with Gnaeus Manlius Vulso	Succeeded by Marcus Valerius Messalla; Gaius Livius Salinator
Preceded by Lucius Valerius Flaccus; Cato the Censor	Roman censor 179 BC with Marcus Aemilius Lepidus	Succeeded by Quintus Fulvius Flaccus; Aulus Postumius Albinus Luscus
