= Monte Brugiana =

Mountain in Tuscany, Italy

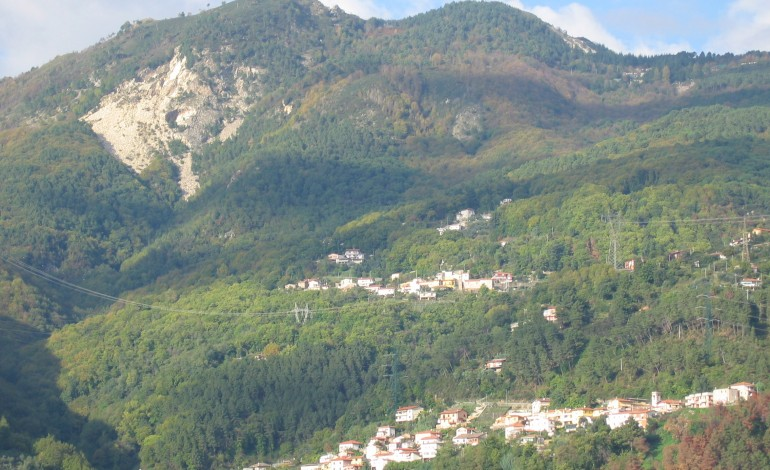

Highest point
- Elevation: 973 m (3,192 ft)
- Prominence: 341 m (1,119 ft)
- Isolation: 3.5 km (2.2 mi)
- Coordinates: 44°04′01″N 10°08′28″E

Geography
- Location within Italy
- Country: Italy
- Province: Massa-Carrara
- Region: Tuscany

Mount Brugiana is a 973-metre (3,192 ft) mountain on the border between the municipalities of Massa and Carrara, within the protected territory of the Apuan Alps Regional Natural Park.

On the slopes of Mount Brugiana is the Park of Resistance, built to honor the memory of Apuan partisans who had settled on the mountain.

== Origins of the name ==
The name "Brugiana" derives from the verb of Vulgar Latin brusiare, later Tuscanized into the form of present-day Italian bruciare.

In dialect pronunciation the g has a fricative sound (voiced postalveolar fricative [ʒ]).

Many believe that the name comes from the legend that Mount Brugiana is an ancient extinct volcano, but this belief turns out to be false since the mountain is not a volcano at all. Others believe, however, that both the name of the mountain and the legend derive from the fact that in ancient times people used to make large signal fires on the summit and the shepherds' habit of burning the grass on the hillsides to make better pastures.

== Geology ==
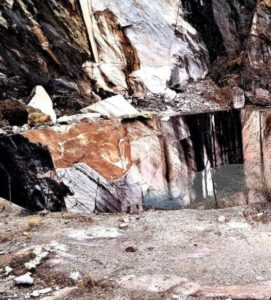
Image of Combratta Quarry

Mt. Brugiana is part of a geological area distinct from the main metamorphic core of the Apuan Alps, called the "Massa Unit."

The mountain has been frequented since protohistory because of the presence on its slopes of iron and other minerals.

Traces of slate can be found on the summit and slopes of the mountain. It was from Mount Brugiana that slate plates were obtained, which were used to cover the roofs of Massese dwellings.

The mountain is rich in muscovite marbles characterized by the presence of fossils and a yellowish-white color that distinguishes them from the normal white Apuan marbles, which are geologically younger. This marble wealth led to the opening of a number of quarries as early as the 17th century; two of these quarries, located 700 meters above sea level and clearly visible from the sea, stain the rich vegetation with a white wound that distinguishes the southern slope. Such quarries are harshly criticized by the No Cav movement.

Abandoned and vegetation-covered mining sites are scattered all over the mountain, but nevertheless some quarries remain active despite the request of the Municipality of Massa to remove the mountain from the list of mining sites and the protests of the CAI, Carrara section, for the contamination of some springs due to Combratta Quarry, in the northern area in Carrara territory; protests that led to the cessation of mining works at Fossa Combratta.

== Paths ==
=== In the past ===
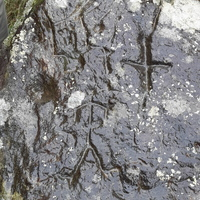
Carvings on a boulder found at Ciampa del Diavolo on Mt. Brugiana

Some studies conducted on the area have given rise to the hypothesis that, already in protohistoric times, artificially created paths were present on Mount Brugiana that from the coastal plain came to extend into Lunigiana by running halfway up Mount Brugiana and the Frigido valley, taking advantage of the presence of raw materials, such as iron, on the mountain. Some archaeological findings near Ciampa del Diavolo suggest that these routes were present as early as Mesolithic times and, almost certainly, in medieval times along with other roads on the ridge of the mountain and on nearby mountains. Some boulders with carvings of filiform anthropomorphs and some crosses have been found along these roads: the former are typical features of the Protohistoric period, while the crosses are traceable to the medieval period. The smooth terrain of the pass of the mouths on Mount Brugiana allowed its frequentation already in protohistoric times as opposed to the paths on the ridge that were used in historical periods when the defense of the territory was more important, as, for example, during the wars between the Romans and the Ligurian-Apuans.

=== In the present ===
The summit of Mount Brugiana is accessible today via CAI trail 152. Trail 152 starts from Carrara but can be shortened by starting from the hamlet of the Carrara municipality that lies on the western slopes of the mountain: Bergiola Foscalina. Trail 152 is the most popular route for hikers but it is not the only way to reach the summit of the mountain. On the trail 152, one encounters a branch that allows one to take trail 151: an old quarry road in the woods that leads to the summit of Mount Brugiana via the eastern slope, passing the 947-meter (947-foot) subpeak.

From the Massese side, an altitude of 800 meters can be reached by following a dirt road that starts just above the village of Bergiola Maggiore; this road can also be traveled by car and makes it possible to arrive at the Park of Resistance and to join trail 151 to reach the summit of the mountain.

Many unnumbered lanes and paths are well known to the local population, as well as quarry roads leading to the marble basins of the Carrara Mountains.

== Mount Brugiana and the Resistance ==
=== Partisan formations ===
During the Resistance, Massa's mountains played an important role for partisans.

Mount Brugiana became the base of two partisan formations:

- The Ceragioli, which later joined the Apuan Patriot Group.
- The Cartolari, named in honor of Aldo Cartolari: a partisan who was believed to have died in the Forno Massacre but was instead deported and killed in a death camp in Germany.

From Mount Brugiana several operations by these two groups started. In early June 1944 the Ceragioli formation implemented a temporary occupation of the village of Colonnata and, together with a formation from Versilia, on June 9 occupied the village of Forno until June 13, the day of the massacre. The Cartolari also carried out several actions, including an attack on a German post near Castagnola that cost the lives of Federico Moisé and Enzo Vipera and led to the capture and torture of Aldo Salvetti, who, found dead crucified to a doorway, later became a symbol of the anti-fascist struggle in the town of Massa.

=== Bergiola massacre ===
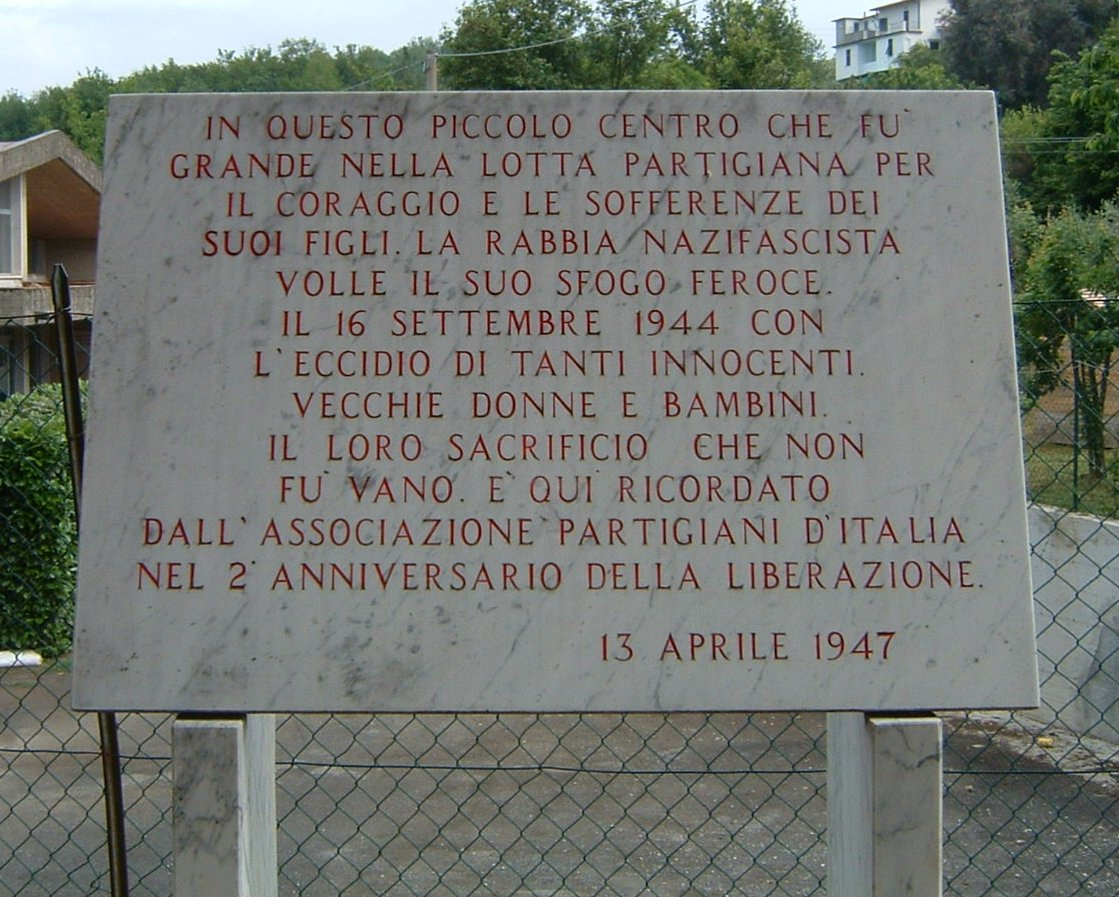
Plaque in memory of the fallen in the Bergiola massacre, placed near the elementary school.

On the slopes of Mount Brugiana on September 16, 1944, a massacre was carried out at the hands of an SS battalion commanded by Major Walter Reder. To avenge the killing of a German soldier near the locality of Foce, the SS entered the village of Bergiola Foscalina, part of the municipality of Carrara and located on the western slope of the mountain. Despite the sacrifice of a marshal of the Guardia di Finanza, Vincenzo Giudice, the Germans locked up the population remaining in the village (consisting mostly of women, elders and children after the men had abandoned their homes following repeated threats) and locked them inside the elementary school to which they then set fire. Seventy-one people died.

Vincenzo Giudice was awarded the Gold Medal.

=== Resistance Park ===
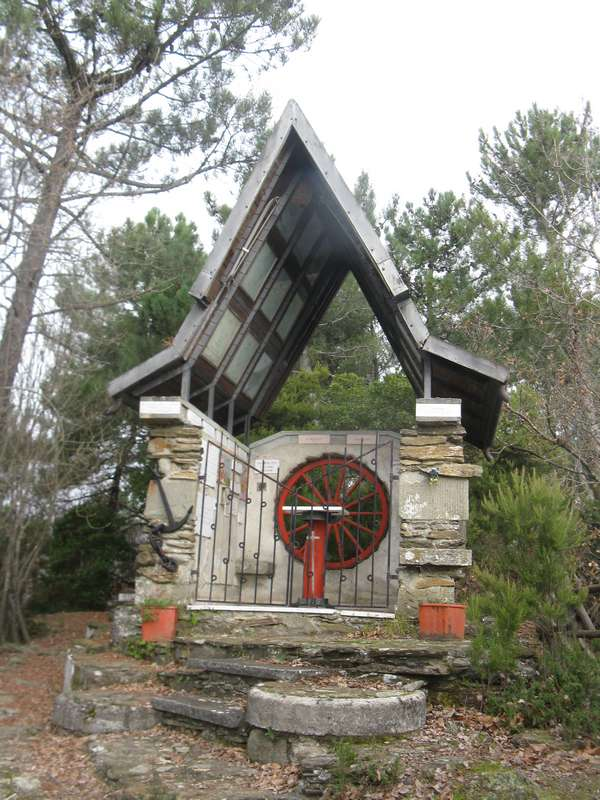
Monument of the Resistance Park on Mount Brugiana

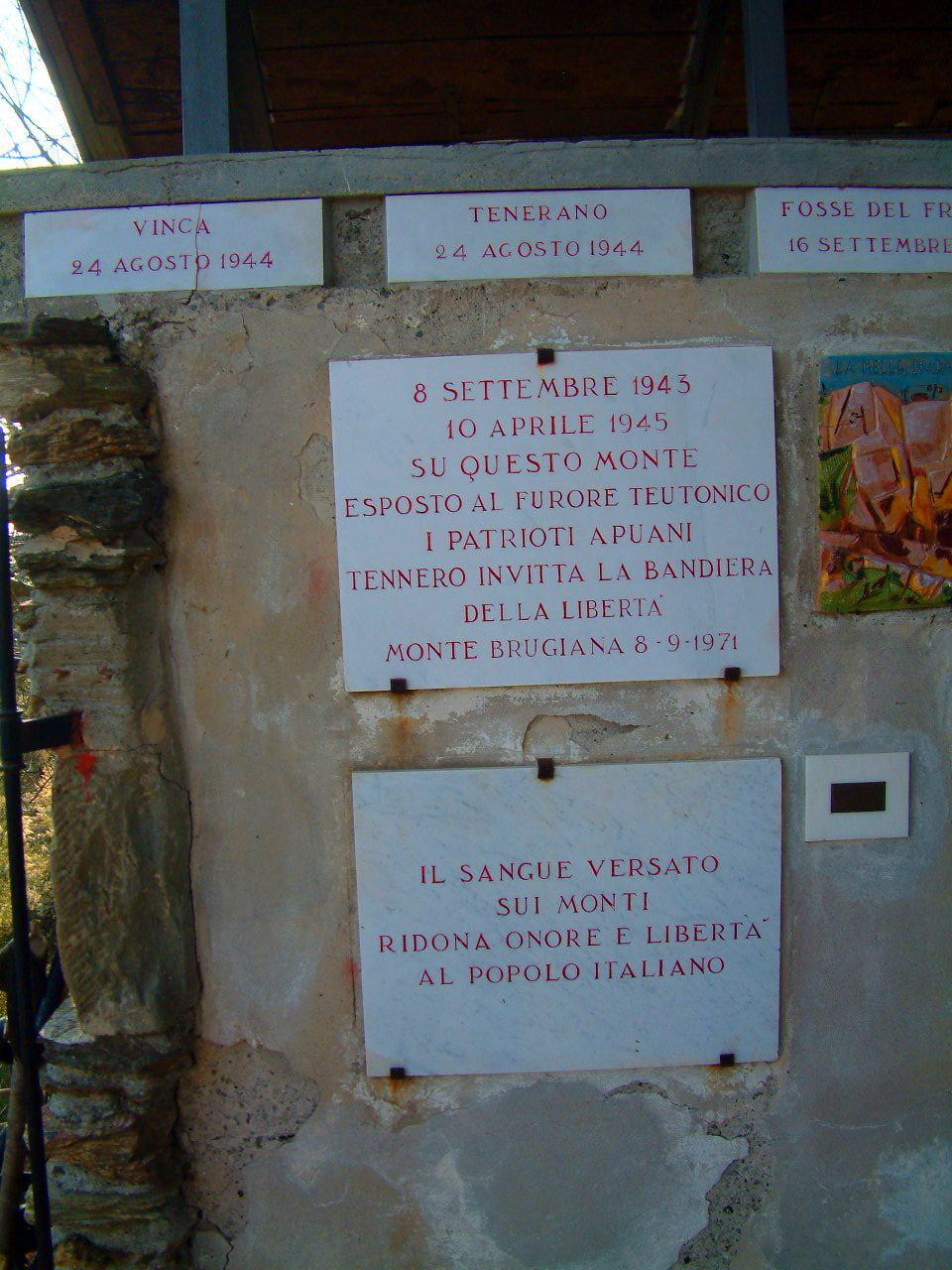
Some slabs found in the park

On the western slope of Mount Brugiana, above the Massese village of Bergiola Maggiore, is the Resistance Park. Conceived and created by Mario Angelotti, a Massese artist and former partisan, the Resistance Park is an open-air place where various memorial plaques and monuments, as well as some military memorabilia, are collected to remember both the fallen partisans and the Apuan workers who lost their lives in the attempt to liberate Italy from Nazi-Fascist occupation.

The park can be reached by following the road from Massa to Bergiola Maggiore, then continuing on the dirt road and continuing on foot for a short piece of road. As of 2019, however, the park is in a state of disrepair, and there have been numerous complaints from the population about the lack of respect for the works of art, displayed in the small shrine, and the memorial slabs.

== The cross on Mount Brugiana ==
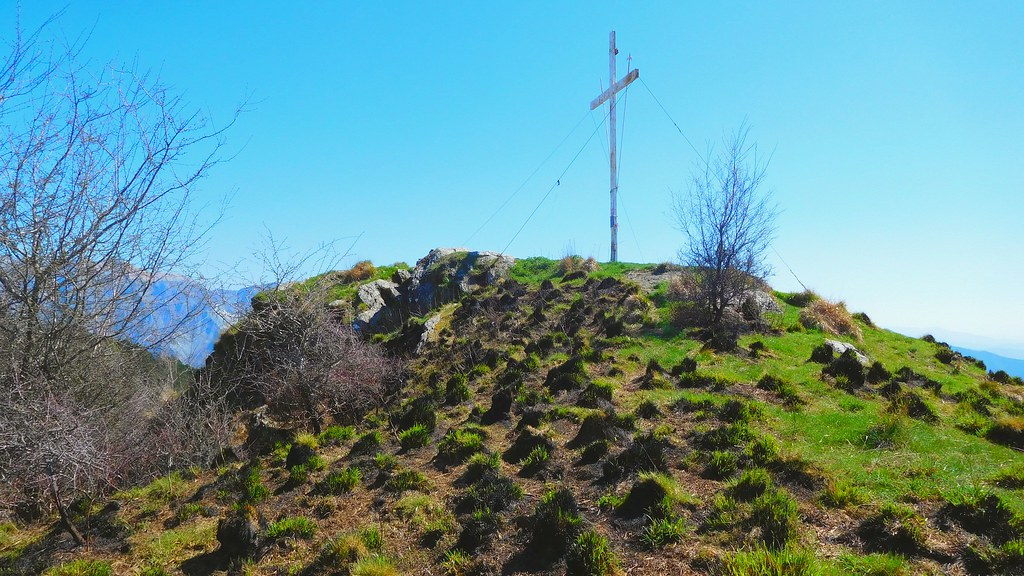
The cross placed on the summit of Mount Brugiana

On the summit of Mount Brugiana, 974 meters above sea level, stands an 8-meter iron cross weighing 7.5 quintals. The cross was manufactured and transported to the top of the mountain on the initiative of the youth of Catholic Action Mirteto, in memory of the fallen of World War II and all the workers who died on the quarries of the mountain.

=== Transportation ===
Manufactured in the summer of 1956 thanks to after-work and overtime services by employees of the Nuovo Pignone in Massa, it was donated by Franco Lazzini to the Parish of Pieve di San Vitale (Mirteto, a hamlet of the municipality of Massa) to be transported by the parishioners themselves to the top of the Mount, after the blessing of the parish priest. The volunteers, young men of various ages from 15 to 45, loaded the two pieces of the cross, which had been previously disassembled, into two vans to proceed by car to the village of Bargana on the Massa side. The roads at the time did not allow them to continue further so the pieces of the cross were carried on their shoulders to the summit where, the previous week, parishioners had built a pedestal. On September 30, 1956, the cross was mounted and hoisted to the summit in its present position.

=== The inauguration ===
On Sunday, June 16, 1957, the cross was officially inaugurated with a ceremony that included a gathering and mass at the foot of the cross.

The cross was artificially illuminated by means of an installation placed at its foot that made it visible even from the seaside towns of Massa.

Every year since 1957, the parish of Pieve di San Vitale has celebrated the anniversary of the inauguration with a series of events in the villages of Mount Brugiana and under the cross with masses in memory of the fallen soldiers.

== Legends and folklore ==
=== The witch woods ===
A part of the forest present on Mount Brugiana is called the "Witch Woods" by the population. The name comes from the location of this part of the forest on a gloomy and damp slope of the mountain. This has made it the subject of a variety of legends linking it to witches and sorcerers who decided to gather in that specific spot because of its gloomy nature.

=== Folk sayings ===
In both Massa and Carrara, Mount Brugiana is the centre of a saying that later became famous throughout Tuscany: "Quando la Brugiana a l'ha el cappelo/ corrè a cà a pidjià l'ombrelo", which translates from the Massa dialect as: "When the top of the Brugiana is covered by clouds, it will rain".

== See also ==
- Apuan Alps

== Bibliography ==
- Emanuele Repetti (1839). Dizionario geografico fisico storico della Toscana. Vol. 3. Firenze: presso l'autore e editore.
- Associazione apuana volontari della libertà Massa, ed. (1975). Il sacrario partigiano del monte Brugiana. Massanessuno, Massa library catalog
- Enrico Della Pina (2000). "La croce sul monte Brugiana". Le Mortelline. Massa: La Pieve Mirtetonessuno, Massa library catalog
