= Quintus Marcius Philippus (consul 186 BC) =

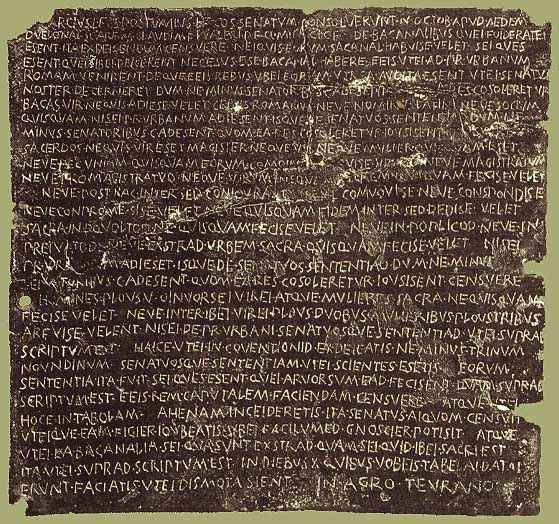
- Senatus consultum de Bacchanalibus CIL I, 581, dated October 7th 186 BC, attesting him as consul

Roman consul

Quintus Marcius Philippus, also Quintus Marcius L. f. Q. n. Philippus (born c. 229 BC), was a Roman consul in 186 BC and again in 169 BC.

During his first consulship, he aided his co-consul Spurius Postumius Albinus in the suppression of the Bacchanalia and the drafting of the senatus consultum de Bacchanalibus.

According to the historian Titus Livius, he was badly defeated by the Apuan Ligures in a 186 BC battle with Saltus Marcius, fought, probably, in the territory of Seravezza.

He was elected praetor in 188 BC and received Sicily as his purview. He served as an ambassador to Macedonia and the Peloponnese in 183 BC, observing the actions of the Achaean League, and he incited the senate's fears of King Perseus in his report the following year. In 180 BC, Philippus replaced Gaius Servilius Geminus as decemvir sacrorum following Geminus’ death. In 172 BC he led an embassy to Greece to attract support in the growing conflict with Perseus, during which they successfully dismantled the Boeotian League and delayed Perseus’ war on Rome. Philippus was reelected consul in 169 BC and lead the Roman army during the third year of the Third Macedonian War.

In 164 BC Philippus was elected censor with Lucius Aemilius Paullus Macedonicus, during which he set up a public sundial in the Rostra next to a previous one by Manius Valerius Maximus Messalla.

Political offices
Preceded by Marcus Aemilius Lepidus and Gaius Flaminius	Consul of the Roman Republic with Spurius Postumius Albinus; 186 BC	Succeeded by Appius Claudius Pulcher and Marcus Sempronius Tuditanus
Preceded by Aulus Hostilius Mancinus and Aulus Atilius Serranus	Consul of the Roman Republic with Gnaeus Servilius Caepio; 169 BC	Succeeded by Lucius Aemilius Paullus Macedonicus and Gaius Licinius Crassus
Preceded by Gaius Claudius Pulcher and Tiberius Sempronius Gracchus	Censor of the Roman Republic with Lucius Aemilius Paullus Macedonicus; 164 BC	Succeeded by Publius Cornelius Scipio Nasica Corculum and Marcus Popillius Laenas
