= Achaion Limen =

Port town of ancient Aeolis

Coordinates: 38°51′29″N 27°02′22″E

Achaion Limen (Ancient Greek: Ἀχαιῶν λιμήν; "Harbor of the Achaeans" or "Achaean Harbor") was a port town of ancient Aeolis.

Arrian records that in 334 BC Alexander the Great crossed the Hellespont, and according to the prevailing account landed at Achaion Limen after sailing from Elaeus, before proceeding to Ilium and beginning his campaign against the Persian Empire.

Livy, records that in 190 BC the Roman commander Gaius Livius Salinator sailed with a fleet toward the Hellespont during the Roman war against Antiochus III the Great. He first puts into the harbor of the Achaion Limen and from there he went to Ilium.

During the Third Mithridatic War, Lucullus was in the Troad region after visiting the Hellespont when he received news from Ilium that thirteen of Mithridates VI of Pontus galleys were near the Harbor of the Achaeans and sailing toward the island of Lemnos. He sailed out, captured them, and killed their commander Isodorus. He then attacked other enemy ships drawn up on shore by landing troops and defeating them in battle, forcing them to flee in confusion.

During the aftermath of the Bellum Siculum, Sextus Pompeius flees after his defeat in Sicily and tries to rebuild his forces in Asia Minor, but is steadily pursued, cut off, and abandoned by allies. After being repulsed near Cyzicus, he retreats to the Harbor of the Achaeans to resupply.

Its site is located near Haci Ahmet Ağa, Asiatic Turkey.
