= Aulus Manlius Vulso =

Aulus Manlius Vulso may refer to:

- Aulus Manlius Vulso (consul 178 BC)
- Aulus Manlius Vulso (decemvir)
- Aulus Manlius Vulso Capitolinus
