= Gaius Flaminius =

Gaius Flaminius can refer to:

- Gaius Flaminius (consul 223 BC)
- Gaius Flaminius (consul 187 BC)
