= Manius Juventius Thalna =

Roman consul

Manius Juventius Thalna (before 206 BC (Note: This is inferred from the minimum ages for Roman magistracies established by the Lex Villia Annalis (180 BC). Because Thalna was praetor in 167 BC, he must have been roughly 40 years old, which implies a birth before 206 BC) – 163 BC) was Roman consul in the year 163 BC, alongside Tiberius Sempronius Gracchus. He belonged to the plebeian gens Juventia.

He was the son of Titus Juventius Thalna, who served as praetor peregrinus in 194 BC.

In 170 BC, he served in the tribune of the plebs. In 167 BC, he served as Praetor.

During his consulship, he commanded Roman forces in Corsica which was experiencing rebellions.

He died a sudden death while performing a religious ritual during his consulship. Pliny the Elder wrote in his Natural History: "Manius Juventius Thalna, consul, died while sacrificing." In Valerius Maximus' book 9, chapter 12 of his work Factorum et Dictorum Memorabilium ("Memorable Deeds and Sayings"), he wrote: "Manius Juventius Thalna, while consul, was struck lifeless while sacrificing at the very altar."
