= Torquatus =

Torquatus is a masculine Latin word (feminine: torquata; neuter: torquatum) meaning "adorned with a neck chain or collar". It may refer to the following ancient Romans:

- Aulus Manlius Torquatus Atticus (died before 216 BC), Roman politician, consul in 244 and 241 BC
- Decimus Junius Silanus Torquatus (c. 16–64), Roman senator, consul in 53
- Gaius Bellicius Calpurnius Torquatus, Roman senator, consul in 148, younger brother of Gaius Bellicius Flaccus Torquatus
- Gaius Bellicius Flaccus Torquatus, Roman senator, consul in 143 and governor of Asia in 156/157, older brother of the above
- Lucius Junius Silanus Torquatus, the shared name of a 1st century uncle and nephew, descendants of the Roman Emperor Augustus
- Lucius Manlius Torquatus (consul 65 BC)
- Marcus Junius Silanus Torquatus, consul in 19
- Marcus Junius Silanus Torquatus (consul 46)
- Titus Manlius Torquatus (disambiguation), four consuls of the Manlia gens, one of whom was a dictator in 208 BC
- Torquatus of Acci, Christian 1st century missionary and Roman Catholic and Eastern Orthodox saint
