= Gnaeus Baebius Tamphilus (consul) =

Gnaeus Baebius Tamphilus was a Roman politician in the second century BC.

== Family ==
He was a member of the gens Baebia. His brother Marcus Baebius Tamphilus held the consulship in 181 BC.

== Career ==
Baebius served as tribune of the plebs in 204 or 203 BC. In 200 BC, he served as an aedile. In the year 199 BC, while serving in the capacity of praetor, Baebius was defeated by the Insubri. In 186 BC, Baebius was put in command of the colonies of Sipontum and Buxetum. In 182 BC, he served as consul together with Lucius Aemilius Paullus Macedonicus as his colleague. In 181 BC, he served as proconsul with his previous colleague Paullus, fighting against the Ligurians.
