= Enzo Fileno Carabba =

Italian writer

- Born: 1 May 1966 (age 60); Florence, Italy
- Occupation: Writer
- Writing career
- Language: Italian

Enzo Fileno Carabba is an Italian writer with published works in Italy and abroad. He writes short stories, scripts for radio, librettos and children's books.

== Biography ==
In 1990 his book Jakob Pesciolini (published by Einaudi, 1992) (the first volume of a trilogy which includes La regola del silenzio (1994) and La Foresta finale (1997)), won the Premio Calvino. In 2003 his novel where the fantastic element is mixed with a strong autobiographical element, Mauvais signes (published by Gallimard, Série Noire) was first distributed in France. It was published in Italy with the title Pessimi segnali (published by Marsilio, 2004). In the novel Le colline oscure (published by Barbera, 2008) Angelo, the protagonist of Pessimi segnali, returns. In 2010 his children's book Fuga da Magopoli (Salani, Gl'Istrici), was the winner of the Premio Critici in Erba 2011. The jury for this award consisted of hundreds of children. In 2011 Con un poco di zucchero (published by Mondadori, Sis) was published. The first chapter of another novel set in Florence, and never published in Italy (La donna dell'ippopotamo) came out in 2012 in the Dutch anthology De stedenverzamelaar. In 2012 the historical novel Attila was published by Feltrinelli. As a journalist he has a column in the Corriere Fiorentino called Storie d'amore in which he tells of the lives of real couples.

== Interests ==
He is a trekking and spear fishing enthusiast and is the author of various nature reportages.

=== Published works ===
- Jakob Pesciolini, Einaudi, 1992. ISBN 978-88-0612-779-4.
- La Regola Del Silenzio, Einaudi, 1994. ISBN 978-88-0613-374-0.
- La Foresta Finale, Einaudi, 1997. ISBN 978-88-0613-933-9.
- Mauvais signes, Gallimard, 2003. ISBN 2070499855.
- Pessimi segnali, Marsilio, 2004. ISBN 978-88-3178-440-5.
- Le colline oscure, Barbera, 2008. ISBN 978-88-7899-249-8.
- Fuga da Magopoli, Salani, 2010. ISBN 88-6256-156-3.
- Con un poco di zucchero, Mondadori, 2011. ISBN 978-88-0460-736-6.
- Firenze in De stedenverzamelaar, Serena Libri, 2012. ISBN 978-90-7627-071-5.
- Attila. L'incontro dei mondi, Feltrinelli, 2012. ISBN 978-88-0792-182-7.
