= Gnaeus Manlius Vulso (consul 189 BC) =

Roman general

Gnaeus Manlius Vulso (fl. 189 BC) was a Roman consul for the year 189 BC, together with Marcus Fulvius Nobilior. He led a victorious campaign against the Galatian Gauls of Asia Minor in 189 BC during the Galatian War. He was awarded a triumph in 187 BC.

Vulso belonged to the patrician gens Manlia, but his connection with the better known Torquatus branch is unknown. He may have been descended from Aulus (or Gaius) Manlius Cn.f. Vulso, consul in 474 BC; or from Lucius Manlius A.f. Vulso Longus, consul in 256 and 250 BC.

A. Manlius Cn.f. Vulso, consul eleven years later in 178 BC, may have been his younger brother.

== See also ==
- Manlia (gens)

== Notes ==
Political offices
Preceded by Lucius Cornelius Scipio Asiaticus and Gaius Laelius	Consul of the Roman Republic with Marcus Fulvius Nobilior; 189 BC	Succeeded by Gaius Livius Salinator and Marcus Valerius Messalla
