= Gaius Claudius Pulcher (consul 177 BC) =

Roman senator

Gaius Claudius Pulcher (died 167 BC), consul in 177 BC, was the son of Appius Claudius Pulcher, consul in 212 BC, and he was the father of Appius Claudius Pulcher, consul in 143 BC. His brothers were Appius Claudius Pulcher (consul 185 BC) and Publius Claudius Pulcher (consul 184 BC).

Augur in 195 BC, suffect praetor peregrinus in 180 BC, during his consulate in 177 BC, he set out to fight against the Istrians, but failed to perform the proper ceremonies and was forced to return to Rome. Setting out again, he defeated the Istrians and moved on to fight the Ligurians, recovering the town of Mutina.

In 169 BC, he was elected censor with Tiberius Sempronius Gracchus, his former co-consul. Their censorship was quite severe and, as a result, they were impeached. They were acquitted due to Gracchus's popularity with the people. Later, in 167 BC, he went as part of an embassy to Macedon. In that year, he died.

Political offices
Preceded by Marcus Junius Brutus; Aulus Manlius Vulso	Roman consul 177 BC with Tiberius Sempronius Gracchus	Succeeded by Gnaeus Cornelius Scipio Hispallus; Quintus Petillius Spurinus
