= Gaius Flaminius (consul 187 BC) =

Roman general and statesman

Gaius Flaminius was Roman consul in 187 BC, together with Marcus Aemilius Lepidus. During his consulship, he fought to pacify Ligurian tribesmen who had been raiding northern Italy.

== Background ==
Flaminius' father, also named Gaius Flaminius, was a popular reformer who had twice been consul, and was killed at the battle of Lake Trasimene in 217 BC, during the Second Punic War. The son's political career began in 209, when Flaminius served as quaestor to Scipio Africanus in Spain. As curule aedile in 196, he distributed large quantities of grain amongst the people at a low price. As praetor in 193, Flaminius was given Hispania Citerior as his province, and there carried on a successful war by besieging and capturing the wealthy town of Litabrum, thereby demonstrating his strategic skills.

== Consulship ==
During his consulship in 187 BC, Flaminius and his colleague, Lepidus, were given the task of fighting the Friniates and the Apuani, two Ligurian tribes that had been raiding in northern Italy. After having gained several victories against both peoples, he reduced them to submission, and peace was restored.

Also during his consulship, Flaminius built a road from Bononia to Arretium, connecting the Via Aemilia, built by his colleague between Ariminum and Placentia, with the Via Cassia, running from Rome to Genua. The name of this route, which provided a direct route between Rome and Bononia, is not known; it should not be confused with the Via Flaminia, constructed by Flaminius' father between Rome and Ariminum.

== Bibliography ==
- Titus Livius (Livy), History of Rome.
- Paulus Orosius, Historiarum Adversum Paganos (History Against the Pagans).
- T. Robert S. Broughton, The Magistrates of the Roman Republic, American Philological Association (1952–1986).
- Oxford Classical Dictionary, N. G. L. Hammond and H. H. Scullard, eds., Clarendon Press, Oxford (Third Edition, 1996).

Political offices
| Preceded by Marcus Valerius Messalla; Gaius Livius Salinator | Roman consul 187 BC with Marcus Aemilius Lepidus | Succeeded by Spurius Postumius Albinus; Quintus Marcius Philippus |
