= Titus Manlius Torquatus =

Titus Manlius Torquatus may refer to four Roman Republican consuls of the Manlia gens:

- Titus Manlius Imperiosus Torquatus, consul in 347, 344, and 340 BC
- Titus Manlius Torquatus (consul 299 BC), grandson of the above, consul in 299 BC who died in office
- Titus Manlius Torquatus (consul 235 BC), great-grandson of the above, consul in 235 and 224 BC
- Titus Manlius Torquatus (consul 165 BC), grandson of the above, consul in 165 BC.

== See also ==
- Manlia (gens)
