= Publius Cornelius Cethegus (consul 181 BC) =

2nd century BC Roman senator and general

Publius Cornelius Cethegus was a Roman senator and military commander.

Cethegus was elected as curule aedile in 187 BC, then served as praetor in 185 BC, and finally became consul in 181 BC. During his consulship, the tomb of the legendary Roman king Numa Pompilius was unearthed. Cethegus and his colleague Marcus Baebius Tamphilus were granted a triumph over the Ligurians, despite the absence of an actual battle. In 173 BC, Cethegus was appointed as one of ten commissioners responsible for the division of Ligurian and Gallic territories in Italy.

Political offices
Preceded by Lucius Aemilius Paullus; Gnaeus Baebius Tamphilus	Roman consul 181 BC; With: Marcus Baebius Tamphilus	Succeeded by Aulus Postumius Albinus Luscus; Gaius Calpurnius Piso
