= Marcus Aemilius Lepidus (consul 187 BC) =

2nd-century BC Roman consul

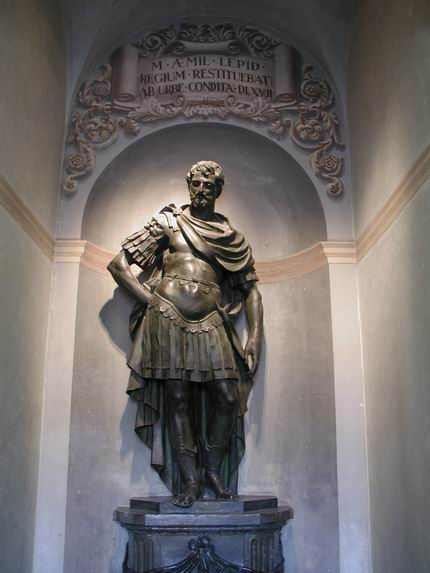
- Statue of Marcus Aemilius Lepidus in the City Hall of Reggio Emilia, which he founded.

Consul of the Roman Republic
- In office 15 March 175 BC – 14 March 174 BC Serving with Publius Mucius Scaevola
- Preceded by: Gnaeus Cornelius Scipio Hispallus and Quintus Petillius
- Succeeded by: Spurius Postumius Albinus Paullulus and Quintus Mucius Scaevola
- In office 15 March 187 BC – 14 March 186 BC Serving with Gaius Flaminius
- Preceded by: Gaius Livius Salinator and Marcus Valerius Messalla
- Succeeded by: Quintus Marcius Philippus and Spurius Postumius Albinus

Pontifex Maximus
- In office 180 BC – 152 BC
- Preceded by: Publius Licinius Crassus
- Succeeded by: Publius Cornelius Scipio Nasica

Personal details
- Born: c. 230 BC; Rome, Roman Republic
- Died: 152 BC; Rome
- Children: Marcus Aemilius Lepidus
- Parent: Marcus Aemilius Lepidus (father)

Marcus Aemilius Lepidus (c. 230 – 152 BC) was a Roman consul, Pontifex Maximus, Censor and Princeps Senatus. A scion of the ancient Patrician gens Aemilia, he was most likely the son of Marcus Aemilius Lepidus, with his brothers being Lucius and Quintus.

According to Polybius, Lepidus was "the handsomest man of his time," as well as, in the words of Diodorus, being "gifted with superior intelligence". Combining these qualities with an impeccable aristocratic birth, political skill and a reputation for bravery, Lepidus soon rose to become one of the leading Romans of his generation.

Lepidus was the great-grandfather of Marcus Aemilius Lepidus the Triumvir.

== Early life ==
Although he was only 15 at the time of the Battle of Cannae in the 2nd Punic War, it was then that Lepidus first distinguished himself. If not at Cannae itself, then in one of the battles closely following it, Lepidus saved the life of one of his countrymen by killing his assailant. For this act of gallantry, the Senate ordered an equestrian statue of the young man erected on the Capitoline to commemorate the deed. It was a remarkable honour for one so young and one that marked Lepidus out for the future greatness he would achieve.

Later that year, 216 BC, Lepidus' father, Marcus Aemilius Lepidus, who had been an augur and twice consul, died and Marcus and his two brothers staged funeral games for three days in his honour.

== Eastern missions ==
In 201, Lepidus and two colleagues were sent as ambassadors by the Senate to king Ptolemy V of Egypt, both to announce Rome's victory over Carthage and ensure that Rome's alliance with Egypt would continue through the coming war with Philip V of Macedon, which the Romans were preparing for. Ptolemy was still only a young boy at this time and there is a tradition that Lepidus for a time acted himself during his stay in Egypt as the king's guardian and for a time governed the country. This appeal to Rome for the Senate to send a regent to them was, according to Justin, made by the Egyptians themselves.

At this time also, while in Alexandria, Lepidus sailed to meet personally with Philip while the king was besieging Abydus, in an attempt to persuade him to lift the siege and abandon his attacks on Pergamum and the Rhodians, who had appealed to Rome. Lepidus delivered a message from the Senate that Philip of Macedon must cease from making war on any other Greeks and agree to pay compensation to Attalus I of Pergamum and Rhodes for any damage caused. If Philip would not agree to these terms then he and Macedon would soon find themselves at war with Rome. Rejecting the demands and saying that he was ready for war, Philip took the city and Lepidus departed. The result of the king's refusal of these terms was the outbreak of the Second Macedonian War.

== Attempts at the Consulship ==
In 193 Lepidus served as curule aedile along with his kinsman Lucius Aemilius Paullus, during which time the two Aemilii constructed two new porticoes, or arcades, in Rome, one of them being the Porticus Aemilia.

Elected as Praetor in 192, Lepidus served his term from 191 and into 190 as the governor of Sicily. Due to the ongoing war between Rome and Antiochus in the East, Lepidus was charged with the defence of the island from attack as well as ensuring that one-fifth of all the corn produced was sent to support the armies campaigning in Greece.

In 190 Lepidus left Sicily early before his term as governor had expired without first asking the permission of the Senate to do so and hastened back to Rome in order to stand in the consular elections. This, however, counted against him and made him unpopular with the people as he was accused of abandoning his province and responsibilities in order to satisfy personal ambition. Following the vote, only one candidate, Marcus Fulvius Nobilior, a rival of Lepidus, had achieved the required majority, but that still meant that the other consulship was vacant. However, the following day, Nobilior co-opted the candidate who had come second, Gnaeus Manlius Vulso, as his colleague and the two assumed the Consulship for 189. Lepidus had polled third out of the four candidates, behind Manlius but ahead of Marcus Valerius Messalla. This humiliating defeat for the aristocratic patrician Lepidus, who likely saw the consulship as his birthright, further embittered a hatred that had already existed between him and Nobilior.

The following election, held later in 189, Lepidus again stood as a candidate for the consulship. Nobilior, however, returned to Rome to conduct and oversee the elections and he used his position to prevent any votes being cast for Lepidus, his personal enemy. As a result, although this time unfairly, Lepidus once more suffered the humiliation of defeat in the elections and could justly blame Nobilior. Instead, Marcus Valerius Messalla, who the previous year had polled behind Lepidus, and Gaius Livius Salinator were elected consul.

For the third successive time, Lepidus stood as a consular candidate in 188, and this time he was successful and was elected consul with Gaius Flaminius as his colleague.

== Consulship ==
In 187 BC, as he and Flaminius assumed office, word reached the Senate that the Ligurians were preparing to make war on Rome. This threat so close to Rome caused the Senate to decreed that both consuls should have Liguria assigned as their joint province and command. Lepidus opposed this, protesting that Nobilior and Manlius were still acting like kings in the East even though their terms had expired and yet the Senate still intended to confine both consuls to Liguria without recalling or replacing either of the two Eastern commanders. Either Nobilior and Manlius should be replaced, or their armies should be disbanded and they return to Rome. The Senate agreed to recall Nobilior and Manlius from the East, but reiterated its decision that both Lepidus and Flaminius were to take command in Liguria.

== First man in Rome ==
From 180 onwards, he was elected pontifex maximus and from 179, he was princeps senatus. That same year he was also elected censor along with his great rival Marcus Fulvius Nobilior. In 175, he was elected consul for the second time. He oversaw construction of the Via Aemilia in 187, a Roman road from the town of Placentia to Ariminum, still in use and one of the most important roads in Northern Italy. He established the Roman colonies of Parma and Mutina and gave his name to the Roman castrum of Regium Lepidi (today Reggio Emilia).

Political offices
Preceded by Gaius Livius Salinator and Marcus Valerius Messalla	Consul of the Roman Republic with Gaius Flaminius; 187 BC	Succeeded by Spurius Postumius Albinus and Quintus Marcius Philippus
Preceded by Gnaeus Cornelius Scipio Hispallus and Quintus Petillius and Gaius Valerius Laevinus (Suffect)	Consul of the Roman Republic with Publius Mucius Scaevola; 175 BC	Succeeded by Spurius Postumius Albinus Paullulus and Quintus Mucius Scaevola
