= Lucius Manlius Acidinus Fulvianus =

Lucius Manlius Acidinus Fulvianus (fl. early 2nd century BC) was an ancient Roman nobilis, born to Quintus Fulvius Flaccus, who had been consul four times, but was adopted into the Manlia gens, probably by Lucius Manlius Acidinus.

Fulvianus was praetor in 188 BC, and had the province of Hispania Citerior allotted to him, where he remained until 186 BC. In the latter year he defeated the Celtiberi, and had it not been for the arrival of his successor would have reduced the whole people to subjection. He applied for a triumph in consequence, but obtained only an ovation. In 183 BC he was one of the ambassadors sent into Gallia Transalpina, and was also appointed one of the triumvirs for founding the Latin colony of Aquileia, which was however not founded until 181 BC.

He was consul in 179 BC, with his brother by birth, Quintus Fulvius Flaccus, which is the only instance of two brothers holding the consulship at the same time during the Republic. At the election of Acidinus, M. Scipio declared him to be virum bonum, egregiumque civem.

== See also ==
- Manlia (gens), for others of this gen
- Acidinus (cognomen), for other Manlii with the cognomen Acidinus
- Acidinus (disambiguation)

Political offices
Preceded by Aulus Postumius Albinus Luscus, and Quintus Fulvius Flaccus, suffect consul	Consul of the Roman Republic; 179 BC with Quintus Fulvius Flaccus	Succeeded by Marcus Iunius Brutus, and Aulus Manlius Vulso
