= Spurius Postumius Albinus (consul 186 BC) =

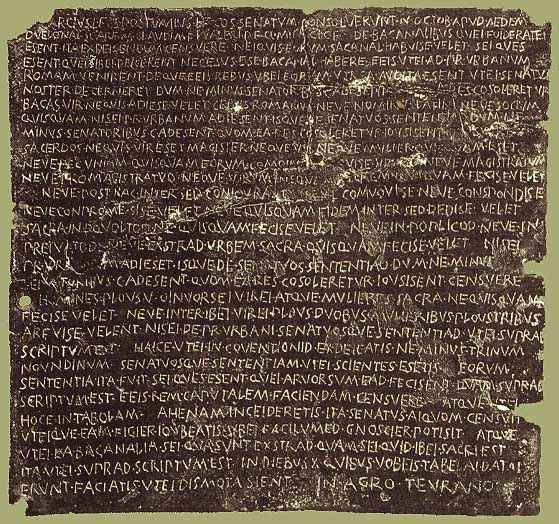
- Senatus consultum de Bacchanalibus CIL I, 581, dated October 7th 186 BC, attesting him as consul

Roman consul

Spurius Postumius Albinus was a politician of ancient Rome, of patrician rank, of the 2nd century BC. He was praetor peregrinus in 189 BC, responsible for Roman interests in foreign affairs; and consul in 186 BC. In his consulship the Senatus consultum de Bacchanalibus was passed, reforming the mystery cult of Bacchus in Rome and among her close allies on the Italian mainland. In Livy's account, this was a reaction to various abominable crimes committed by members of the cult, and its threat to the Roman state. More likely, the legislation represents an attempt by Postumius and the senate to impose traditional Roman values and collective authority over a well organised, unofficial civil and religious association that seemed dangerously popular, widespread and potentially subversive. The legislation followed close after a particularly traumatic and turbulent period in Rome's history; Postumius was also an augur, which gave him a degree of religious authority. He died in 179 BC at an advanced age.

== See also ==
- Postumia gens

Political offices
Preceded by M. Aemilius Lepidus; G. Flaminius	Roman consul 186 BC; With: Q. Marcius Philippus	Succeeded by Ap. Claudius Pulcher; M. Sempronius Tuditanus
