= Marcus Valerius Messalla (consul 188 BC) =

Marcus Valerius Messalla served as prefect of the fleet in Sicily in 210 BC, the ninth year of the Second Punic War, carried out a successful raid on the countryside around Utica. He was nominated dictator, but his appointment was annulled. Messalla was praetor peregrinus in 194 BC, and Roman consul for 188 BC, together with Gaius Livius Salinator.

Political offices
Preceded by Gnaeus Manlius Vulso and Marcus Fulvius Nobilior	Consul of the Roman Republic with Gaius Livius Salinator; 188 BC	Succeeded by Marcus Aemilius Lepidus and Gaius Flaminius
