= Marcus Baebius Tamphilus =

Roman consul in 181 BC

Marcus Baebius Tamphilus was a consul of the Roman Republic in 181 BC along with P. Cornelius Cethegus. Baebius is credited with reform legislation pertaining to campaigns for political offices and electoral bribery (ambitus). The Lex Baebia was the first bribery law in Rome and had long-term impact on Roman administrative practices in the provinces.

Baebius played an important diplomatic and military role in the Roman-Syrian War. In carrying out the deportation of the Apuani of Liguria for the purpose of occupying their territory, Baebius is also a significant figure in tracing the history of Roman expansionism.

== Family ==
During the Republican era, all men with the family name Baebius who are known to have held the highest magistracies belong to the branch distinguished by the cognomen Tamphilus. Marcus's brother Gnaeus was consul in 182 BC, in an unusual instance of two brothers holding the office in succession. Their father, Quintus, was a praetor; the Q. Baebius Tamphilus who was tribune of the plebs in 200 may have been the eldest of his sons.

== Early career ==
M. Baebius Tamphilus was a tribune of the plebs in 194. In that same year, he served on a three-man commission (triumviri coloniae deducendae) with an otherwise unknown Decimus Junius Brutus and the Marcus Helvius who was praetor in 197, for the purpose of establishing a Roman colony at Sipontum in southern Italy.

== Roman-Syrian War ==
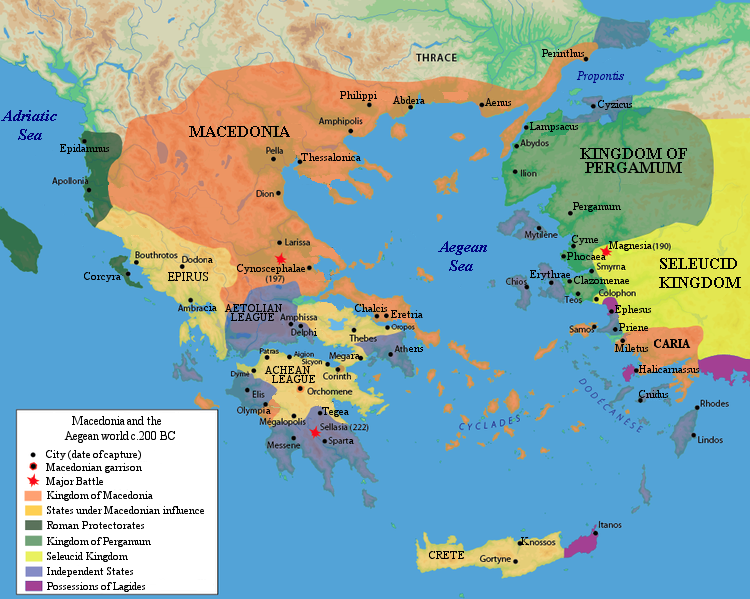
Baebius’s theater of operations: Macedonia and the Aegean, c. 200 BC

See Roman–Syrian War for background on Baebius's military and diplomatic activities.

In November 193 BC, Baebius was elected praetor for the following year. In the sortition to allot provinces Baebius drew Hispania Citerior and Atilius Serranus got Hispania Ulterior. Although the sequence of events and thus reconstructions of causation differ among scholars, the Roman Senate decided to override the lots, a constitutional procedure that during this period required a senatorial decree and a vote in the people's assembly. The senate is sometimes thought to have reacted to news at Rome that Antiochus III of Syria had invaded Greece by crossing to Demetrias, but this report was likely not delivered until mid-year. At any rate, the senate awarded Atilius the dual provinciae of Macedonia and the Roman fleet, with orders to build 30 quinqueremes and to man them with sailors from the allies, and sent him in the spring of 192 to the Peloponnese. Baebius was given a provincia over the Bruttii, in modern-day Calabria, with command of two legions, 15,000 Italian allied infantry, and 500 Italian allied cavalry. The Bruttii had sided with Hannibal and the Carthaginians until their defeat by the Romans; during the previous year, three Roman colonies had been established in their confiscated territory, which was not yet regarded as secure. Later that year, Baebius and his troops were moved to Tarentum and Brundisium, where he prepared for a crossing to Epirus. During this same time, the consul L. Quinctius Flamininus levied troops in preparation for war the following year. From 192 to 190, praetors were regularly dispatched to southern Italy to guard the coastline against rumored attack and to ensure the continued loyalty of Roman allies. Baebius's assignment from the senate was "to guard the entire coast in the vicinity of Tarentum and Brundisium."

As propraetor for the following year, Baebius was assigned to Macedonia and Greece. These territories had not been annexed under Roman rule at the time, and the assignment was a military command. The provinciae of Baebius and Atilius in the East overlap, but their missions differ. Atilius was charged with defending Roman allies with his fleet, ostensibly against Nabis of Sparta, who in any event had died before the praetor's arrival. Baebius's smaller force, shipped out in September or October, held the region around Apollonia.

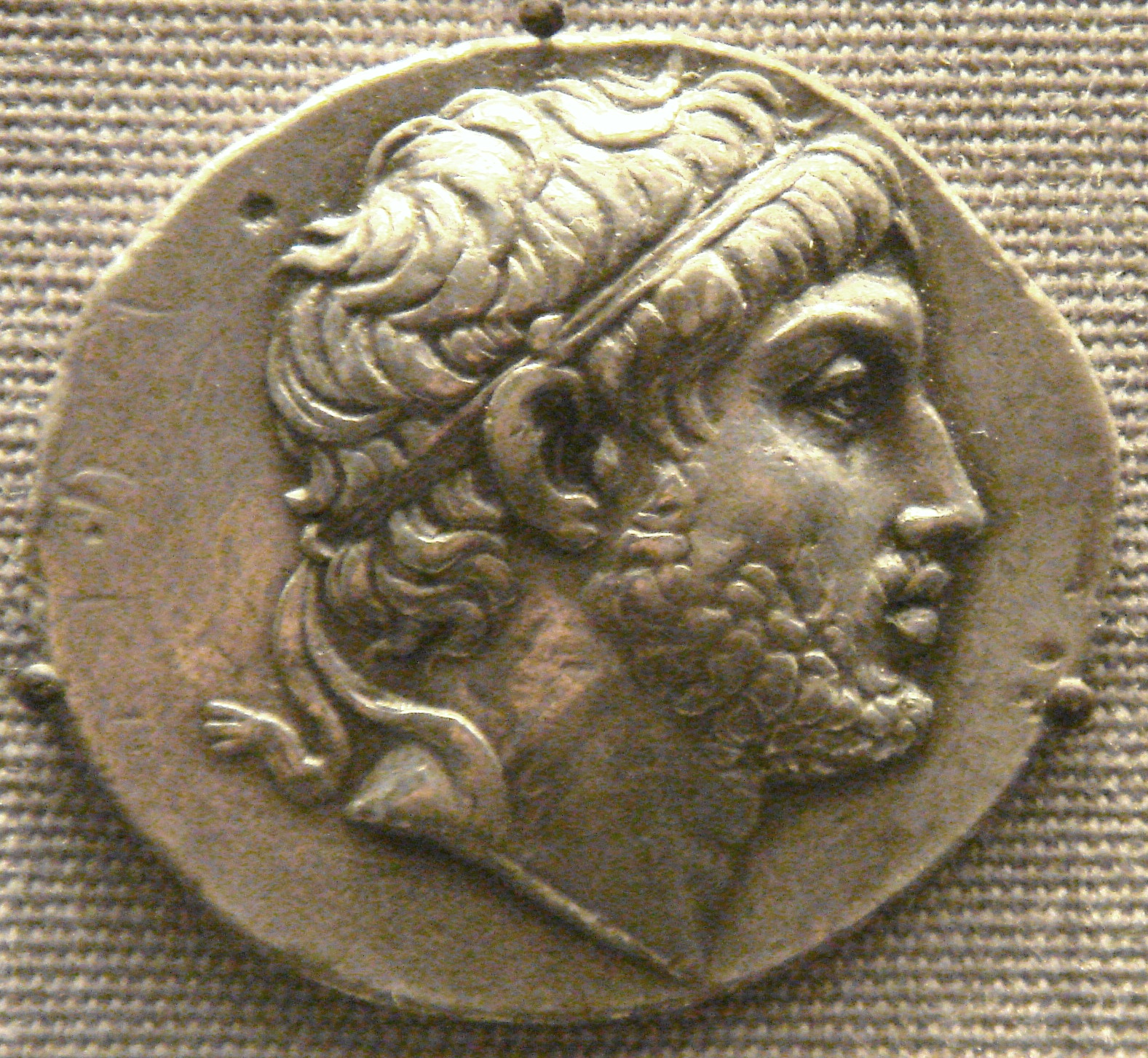
Tetradrachm of Philip V of Macedon (British Museum)

During the winter of 191, Baebius negotiated at Dassaretis with Philip V of Macedon, who was increasingly ill-disposed toward Antiochus. Only the city of Demetrias and the Aetolians were supporting Antiochus. Baebius agreed that Philip should keep any territories he captured from the Aetolians and their allies, and Baebius himself garrisoned the strategically located Thessalian city of Larisa in time to prevent its capture by Antiochus. Before the arrival of the new consul M'. Acilius Glabrio in April, Philip and Baebius had conducted "devastatingly swift" operations in Thessaly that regained most of the towns the Aetolians had taken in the previous year, leaving little that Glabrio would be required to do. The consul's arrival precipitated the surrender of most of Antiochus's allies, and left the forces of the East outnumbered militarily by a two-to-one margin. Facing either retreat to Asia or a battle on his own terms, Antiochus chose to fight at Thermopylae, in the hope of using the terrain to compensate for his disadvantages. After an overwhelming defeat, he was compelled to abandon Greece, and returned to Ephesus. The entire campaign lasted only about six months.

Although Antiochus's invasion had failed, the need to respond to it had shown the Roman senate the vulnerability of the settlement arrived at in Greece in 194, which diplomatic missions had hoped to address. "The conclusion was typical," notes a historian of the period, "not that the settlement was wrong in principle, but that the general conditions under which it had been implemented were too uncertain. Rome needed to ensure that no major threat to the peace existed, not merely in the Balkans, but in the whole Aegean area, including Asia Minor. … It was necessary to redefine, but this time not just in terms of physical geography but in terms of geo-politics." As a result, L. Cornelius Scipio, consul for 190, was given Greece as his province, with the understanding that he should cross into Asia as he deemed necessary.

== Diplomatic missions ==
From 185 to 184, Baebius was one of the ambassadors (legati) sent to negotiate disputes between Philip, his former joint commander in the Roman-Syrian War, and surrounding Greek polities, who had lodged complaints about Philip's occupation of Aenus and Maroneia. At a hearing, Philip himself testified on the question of whether Rome had agreed that he could hold any cities he had captured during the campaign of 191, or only those cities that had been "originally" Aetolian. Although Baebius should have been able to answer that question conclusively, he appears not to have, and the commission arrived at no summation: "The hearing was in fact a farce."

The delegation also met with Achaean magistrates to discuss Achaean treatment of Sparta.

== Consulship and triumph ==
Marcus Baebius succeeded his brother Gnaeus in the consulship. Family influence was perhaps not absent in the election, since it fell to Gnaeus as presiding magistrate to select rogatores, the election officials to whom voters voiced their choice, and to declare the winners.

The consular colleague of Baebius in 181 was P. Cornelius Cethegus. Both consuls were assigned to Liguria as their province. Their efforts to levy troops were hampered by a plague, and this delay kept them from coming to the aid of the proconsul L. Aemilius Paullus, who was under siege. Paullus managed a victory without their relief, took an impressive number of prisoners of war, and earned a triumph.

Other Ligures sent peace envoys to Rome, and while their overtures were rejected by the distrustful senate, Cornelius and Baebius faced no military challenges in their province. Their imperium was nevertheless prorogued for the following year. The senate's instructions were that they should await their successors and then dismiss their troops and return to Rome, but when the plague claimed the life of one of the consuls for 180, public business was suspended, and the two proconsuls decided to march against the Ligurian Apuani, presumably without authorization. The Apuani, who had no reason to expect an attack from Rome after extending an offer of peace, were caught by surprise and effected an immediate surrender (deditio).

The senate then approved a plan for removing the Apuani from their land and allocated "sizable" public funds for that purpose. The proconsuls forced thousands of families to leave their homes in the mountains and resettled them in territory which formerly belonged to the Samnites and which was now ager publicus, land held in common ostensibly for the benefit of the Roman people. It was claimed that this action reduced the Apuanian threat to the security of the Republic, and the senate voted Cornelius and Baebius a triumph without controversy, though others had been denied under similar circumstances for insufficient hostages or booty for the treasury. The Augustan historian Livy, however, later said that this was the first triumph awarded nullo bello gesto, "without a war waged." The policy of deportation continued to be carried out by consuls assigned to Liguria for several years, and substantial populations from among the Ligures were moved to central Italy.

=== Electoral reform ===
It was Baebius's task also to hold elections for the next year. Rome's expansionist activities had created a culture of ambition that threatened to corrupt the electoral process. A flurry of legislation in the 190s and 180s attempted to address these growing problems. Advancement through the political career track had not been regularized before the 190s; the consulship and praetorship might be held in either order, without prerequisites. At the beginning of the Republic, imperium had been granted to the two consuls and a sole praetor; by 197 BC, there were six praetors. The annexation of territories had led to a shortage of personnel qualified to hold imperium and meet administrative and military demands in the new provinces, and commands were frequently extended (prorogatio) beyond the annual magistracy. A law dating to ca. 196 BC began to require that candidates for the consulship must first have served as praetors, and fiercer competition for the praetorship stimulated campaign corruption and bribery (ambitus).

Baebius spearheaded legislation to crack down on ambitus. Anyone convicted of bribery was disqualified from holding public office for ten years. This law was accompanied by an attempt to regulate prorogation. The Lex Baebia et Cornelia of 181 devised a complicated system aimed at limiting the number of ex-praetors vying for the consulship. In the sortition for provinciae, the two Spains were to be left out in odd-numbered years, and only four praetorships would be available in those years. In effect, a provincial appointment in Spain meant automatic prorogation, resulting in a two-year term. The Lex Baebia thus marks the constitutionalized acceptance of routinely extending commands past the year of the elected magistracy. This law was supported by M. Porcius Cato, the famous legislative and moral reformer. But because this limit only decreased the number of administrators available for other provinces, resulting in further use of prorogation, six praetors became the norm again in the mid-170s, and the moral issues were set aside.

These laws should also be viewed in the context of other legislation during the Middle Republic that was aimed at disrupting the hold of factions and dynasties on political power. The extra-constitutional activities of Cornelius and Baebius in Liguria may cast doubt on the extent to which personal probity underlay their efforts at reform. A law proposed in 151 BC and also supported by Cato forbade reelection to the consulship after M. Claudius Marcellus held his third term; the early 20th-century historian G.W. Botsford observed that while Cato may have intended to help "new men" (novi homines) advance, in practice "the measure contributed to the further subordination of the individual to the plutocratic machine." Botsford held that the Baebian bribery law was put forward "in the same partisan spirit rather than in the interest of political morality," and that it failed to achieve its aim. Another consular Lex de ambitu in 159 is sometimes thought to have carried the death penalty, but in practice the punishment was exile, and "this law had no more effect than the earlier."

== See also ==
- Baebia gens

== Selected bibliography ==
- Brennan, T. Corey. The Praetorship in the Roman Republic. Oxford University Press, 2000. Limited preview online.
- Grainger, John D. The Roman War of Antiochos the Great. Brill, 2002. Limited preview online.

Political offices
Preceded by L. Aemilius Paullus; Gn. Baebius Tamphilus	Roman consul 181 BC with P. Cornelius Cethegus	Succeeded by A. Postumius Albinus Luscus; G. Calpurnius Piso
