= Quintus Petillius Spurinus =

Roman politician (2nd century BC)

Quintus Petillius Spurinus was a Roman politician in the second century BC.

== Career ==
Quintus Petillius served as Tribune of the plebs in 187 BC, accusing Lucius Cornelius Scipio Asiaticus of embezzlement. In 181 BC, he instigated the burning of the recently discovered writings of Numa Pompilius. In 176 BC, he was elected consul together with Gnaeus Cornelius Scipio Hispallus as his colleague. After the sudden death of Hispallus of illness, Petillius held elections, in which Gaius Valerius Laevinus was appointed suffect consul. He then begun an expedition against the Ligurians, falling in battle.
