= Marcus Junius Brutus (consul) =

Roman consul 178 BC

Marcus Junius Brutus was a Roman politician in the second century BC.

== Career ==
In 195 BC, Brutus, serving in the capacity of tribune of the plebs, together with consul Marcus Porcius Cato, unsuccessfully attempted to stop the repeal of the Lex Oppia. In 193 BC, he served as aedile. In 191 BC, he dedicated the Temple of Cybele and started the regular annual celebration of the Megalesia as praetor urbanus. In 178 BC, Brutus was elected consul together with Aulus Manlius Vulso. Brutus fought against the Ligurians, then helped his colleague, who was fighting in Histria. Both consuls continued to fight against Histria in the following year. In 169 BC, Brutus unsuccessfully ran as a candidate for censor. In 164 BC, he was sent as an ambassador to King Ariathes V to settle his war with the Galatians.
