= Gaius Livius Salinator =

Roman consul in 188 and praetor in 193 and 191 BC

Gaius Livius Salinator (died c. 170 BC) was a Roman consul in the year 188 BC and general who fought during the Antiochene war.

Salinator was the son of the Marcus Livius Salinator who was twice consul (219 and 207 BC) and censor in 204 BC. Gaius Salinator was inducted into the pontifices by 211 BC and served until around 170 BC. He held the curule aedileship in 204 BC and was elected to a praetorship two years later in 202; he served the year in Bruttium. He may have been a legate, commanding a fleet in Greece, during the Second Macedonian War from 199 to 198 before being relieved by Lucius Quinctius Flaminius. In 193 BC, he was a cavalry prefect under the consul Lucius Cornelius Merula in Gaul, during which he engaged in a battle near Mutina against the Boii.

Salinator was elected as praetor in the year 191 BC, during which he was assigned to command a Roman fleet in the Aegean during the war on Antiochus. There, he defeated Antiochus' fleet near Corycus. He was prorogued into 190 BC before being succeeded by Lucius Aemilius Regillus, one of the praetors of that year; he then completed a mission to Lycia and headed an embassy to Bithynia before returning home. Elected to the consulship of 188 BC, Salinator was assigned to Gaul but three days before he left, on 17 July under the proleptic Julian calendar, a total solar eclipse placed Rome into darkness. During his time in Gaul he founded the city of Forum Livii.

Political offices
Preceded by Gnaeus Manlius Vulso and Marcus Fulvius Nobilior	Consul of the Roman Republic with Marcus Valerius Messalla; 188 BC	Succeeded by Marcus Aemilius Lepidus and Gaius Flaminius
