= Aulus Manlius Vulso (consul 178 BC) =

2nd-century BC Roman senator

Aulus Manlius Vulso (fl. 194–177 BC) was a Roman senator. From 194 to 192 BC, he was a member of a board assigned to colonize the area around Thurii and Castrum Frentinum. He may have served as suffect praetor in 189 BC and was elected consul in 178 BC.

As consul, he was assigned to govern Cisalpine Gaul. He invaded Istria and defeated the Istri, suffering some initial setbacks. His command and that of his colleague, Marcus Junius Brutus, were prorogued to the following year, and they quarreled with the succeeding consul, Gaius Claudius Pulcher, who then took over command of their troops.

Preceded by Quintus Fulvius Flaccus; Lucius Manlius Acidinus Fulvianus	Roman consul 178 BC; With: Marcus Junius Brutus	Succeeded by Gaius Claudius Pulcher; Tiberius Sempronius Gracchus
