= Aulus Postumius Albinus Luscus =

Roman senator

Aulus Postumius Albinus Luscus was a politician of Ancient Rome, of patrician rank, of the 2nd century BC. He was curule aedile in 187 BC, when he exhibited the Great Games, praetor in 185 BC, and consul in 180 BC. In his consulship he conducted the war against the Ligurians.

He was censor in 174 BC with Quintus Fulvius Flaccus. Their censorship was a severe one; they expelled nine members from the Roman Senate, and degraded many of equestrian rank. They enacted, however, many public works. He was elected in his censorship one of the decemviri sacrorum in the place of Lucius Cornelius Lentulus. In 175 BC he was sent into northern Greece to inquire into the truth of the representations of the Dardanians and Thessalians about the Bastarnae and Perseus of Macedon. In 171 BC he was sent as one of the ambassadors to Crete; and after the conquest of Macedonia in 168 BC he was one of the ten commissioners appointed to settle the affairs of the country with Lucius Aemilius Paullus Macedonicus. Livy not infrequently calls him "Luscus", from which it would seem that he was blind in one eye.

== Family ==
He was probably a brother of Spurius Postumius Albinus Paullulus and Lucius Postumius Albinus, and father of Aulus Postumius Albinus.

== See also ==
- Postumia gens

Political offices
Preceded by Publius Cornelius Cethegus; Marcus Baebius Tamphilus	Roman consul 180 BC; With: Gaius Calpurnius Piso; Quintus Fulvius Flaccus	Succeeded by Quintus Fulvius Flaccus; Lucius Manlius Acidinus Fulvianus
