= Apuani =

Ancient Ligurian people of north-west Italy

The Apuani or Ligures Apuani were a Ligurian people who in the Iron Age and the Roman period inhabited the mountainous country of north-western Tuscany and the lower valley of the Magra river, around the Apuan Alps. They are known mainly for their part in the wars between Rome and the Ligurians of the early 2nd century BC, in the course of which the Roman Republic removed some 40,000 of them to Samnium in 180 BC and a further 7,000 in 179 BC. Resistance among the south-eastern Ligurians was not finally broken until 155 BC.

== Name ==
The Apuani are named almost exclusively by Livy, who calls them Ligures Apuani or simply Apuani and records them by name from the campaign of 187 BC. Pliny names not the people but their deported descendants, the Ligures Baebiani et Corneliani of Samnium.

The ethnonym Apuani is formed with the suffix -ano- on a toponymic base *apua. Through its primary suffix -uo-, this base parallels other pre-Roman place-names of northern Italy such as Genua, Adua and Padua. Giulia Petracco Sicardi takes Apua- to be a toponymic base built on a root ap-, for which no further Indo-European etymology has been proposed. The same root may be preserved in the sequence read apus on one of the inscribed statue-stelae of the Lunigiana, the so-called Filetto II stele.

== Geography ==
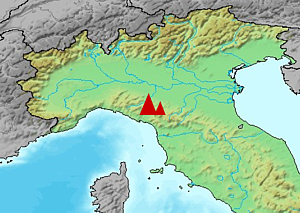
Location of the Alpi Apuane in Italy

The Apuani held the high country on the Tyrrhenian side of the northern Apennines, between the Arno and the Magra: the hills above Pistoia, the Garfagnana, the upper Versilia and the Magra valley, around the mountain bastion of the Apuan Alps. On the opposite, Emilian slope of the same range lay the Friniates, with whom they were closely linked and with whom the sources often associate them.

The Ligurians had taken the plain of the Lunigiana and pressed southward against the territory of the Etruscan city of Pisa, which extended towards the Serchio, before the end of the 3rd century BC. The land at the mouth of the Magra on which Rome was later to found the colony of Luna had belonged to the Etruscans before it was Ligurian. The finer internal organisation of the Apuani is poorly documented: ancient authors describe them as one of the more powerful confederations of the eastern Ligurians, but modern reconstructions of a hierarchy of castella and pagi, such as that proposed by Gambaro, rest on weak evidence.

== History ==
=== Origins ===
The material culture of the territory between the Arno and the Magra in the early Hellenistic age is largely homogeneous and shows strong links with regions much further to the north-west, in particular the archaic Golasecca culture. Adriano Maggiani reads this as an archaeological confirmation of the ancient view that the Ligurians were novi advenae, recent arrivals in a land that had previously been Etruscan, and infers a movement of population southward from the heart of Liguria proper around the 5th century BC, set off by the collapse of Etruscan Padania under the Gallic invasion.

=== Wars with Rome ===
After the Second Punic War Rome turned to the subjugation of the Ligurians. It has been suggested that the first Roman campaigns in the region, between 238 and 233 BC, were already directed in part against the Apuani. In 193 BC a large Ligurian force attacked Pisa and the territory of Luni, and the consul Quintus Minucius Thermus drove it back. The Apuani and Friniates were the object of a major offensive in 187 BC by the consuls Gaius Flaminius and Marcus Aemilius Lepidus. Further campaigns followed: in 186 BC the consul Quintus Marcius Philippus was ambushed in Apuani country and lost some 4,000 men, at a place thereafter called the Saltus Marcius, and in 185 BC the consul Sempronius forced a passage through to the Magra.

=== Deportation to Samnium (180–179 BC) ===
In 180 BC the proconsuls Publius Cornelius Cethegus and Marcus Baebius Tamphilus, whose command in Liguria had been prorogued, received the surrender of about 12,000 Apuani. With the authorisation of the Senate, obtained by letter, they removed the Apuani from their mountains and resettled them on public land in Samnium, the ager Taurasinus which had formerly belonged to the Taurasini, judging this the only way to bring the Ligurian war to an end. About 40,000 free persons, "with women and children" (cum feminis puerisque), were transferred at public expense and given 150,000 (in silver) towards their establishment, and a board of five commissioners was appointed to allot the land. Because the surrender had been peaceful, the proconsuls celebrated a triumph without captives or spoils. In 179 BC the consul Quintus Fulvius Flaccus transferred a further 7,000 Apuani from around the Magra to be settled near the earlier group. (Note: Whether the two figures represent two separate transfers or a single transfer counted twice is disputed, and the combined total of about 47,000 has been thought too high.) The deportees, settled in the Samnite and Hirpinian country, were long distinguished as the Ligures Baebiani et Corneliani. The settlement of the Baebiani has been located near Circello. (Note: The location is fixed by the Tabula alimentaria of the Ligures Baebiani, from near Circello; the settlement of the Ligures Corneliani is less securely identified.)

The episode belongs to a period of institutional change at Rome, and coincided with the lex Villia annalis of 180 BC and with a law, perhaps of about 179 BC, that for the first time appears to have set a minimum of 5,000 enemy killed as a condition for a triumph at public expense. The reported figure of 40,000 has been much debated. Mattia Balbo argues that it is a Roman estimate, obtained by multiplying the 12,000 who first surrendered by roughly three, on the model of the family units settled in colonies, so that the transfer may have been reckoned and organised in the same way as a colonial foundation. (Note: It is disputed whether the 40,000 includes the 12,000 who first surrendered, giving a total of about 40,000, or whether cum feminis puerisque means "together with" women and children in addition, which would raise the total considerably; a much higher figure is difficult to reconcile with estimates of the manpower of Republican Italy.)

The political character of the transfer is contested. Alberto Barzanò interpreted it not as a punitive deportation but as a settlement accepted, or even sought, by the Ligurians under a foedus. Against this it has been argued that the Livian account does not permit so favourable a reading, and Balbo prefers the neutral term "transfer". Ancient writers contrast the relatively mild treatment of the Apuani in 180–179 with the harshness of Marcus Popilius Laenas towards the Statielli in 173–172 BC, whose enslavement the Senate disowned.

=== Final subjugation (155 BC) ===
The transfers of 180–179 BC did not end Ligurian resistance, and the region was not fully pacified until 155 BC, when the consul Marcus Claudius Marcellus campaigned against the Apuani and celebrated a triumph over them. That a triumph could still be won over the Apuani at that date, together with archaeological traces of surviving Ligurian and Boian communities, indicates that the deportations had removed only part of the people.

== Settlement and material culture ==
The archaeological record allows a settlement history to be traced in outline. In the later 4th and early 3rd centuries BC, settlements and cemeteries were concentrated in the northern part of the territory: a strong nucleus at Ameglia, near the mouth of the Magra, profited from maritime trade, while other groups occupied naturally strong inland sites in the upper Garfagnana, such as Monte Pisone, Colle delle Carbonaie and Villa Collemandina. In the course of the 3rd century Ameglia was largely abandoned, perhaps as Rome's interest in the anchorage at the Magra mouth grew, while Ligurian settlement spread through the Versilia and Garfagnana, marked by small cemeteries of cist (a cassetta) graves.

The necropolis of Cafaggio at Ameglia, in use in the late 4th and 3rd centuries BC, has yielded some fifty-four tombs: male cremation graves furnished with spears, swords and helmets, including sheaths decorated in the La Tène manner, and female burials with gold jewellery of Etruscan inspiration. The site appears to have been an emporium through which Etruscan and Greek goods passed. The ethnic attribution of the Ameglia community is debated, the group having been assigned either to the Apuani or to the neighbouring Tigulli. (Note: For Maggiani the attribution is uncertain, some scholars assigning the Ameglia group to the Tigullii; Mees treats the Ameglia inscriptions as Apuani.)

The oldest written records from the territory are the inscribed statue-stelae of the Lunigiana, carved in an Etruscan-derived alphabet and dated to the end of the 7th and the middle of the 6th century BC, long before the Apuani appear in the historical record. They are funerary monuments that seem to record little more than the names of the warriors depicted on them.

The Apuani also used the Etruscan-derived script to mark the ownership of personal possessions: two such owner's inscriptions, of the 4th and 3rd centuries BC, are known from bowls in the Cafaggio necropolis at Ameglia, of which only one appears to be linguistically Ligurian and the other Etruscan.

== Baebiani and Corneliani ==
The Apuani deported to Samnium in 180–179 BC were settled on the ager Taurasinus, public land north-east of the Latin colony of Beneventum that had belonged to the Samnite town of Taurasia, taken by Rome in 298 BC. Whether the transfer created one community or two is disputed. On the traditional view two distinct cities were founded, the Ligures Baebiani and the Ligures Corneliani, named after the two commanders, Baebius and Cornelius, the existence of the Corneliani being attested by an inscription from Allifae naming a curator Ligurum Cornelianorum. John R. Patterson argued instead for a single city bearing both their names, the Ligures Baebiani et Corneliani, a reading that would account for the near-silence of the sources on the Corneliani and for the difficulty of locating them.

Survey of the territory by the Ligures Baebiani Project in the 1980s found no trace of a settlement hierarchy. The land appears to have been distributed in lots of roughly equal size, with no larger holdings reserved for a Ligurian elite. The settlers left so little material trace that they remained archaeologically almost invisible for about a century and a half. The land was poor and largely pastoral, crossed by a transhumance route that may already have been in use under the pre-Roman town of Taurasia.

The community survived into the Empire. Part of its territory was absorbed by Beneventum at the triumviral colonisation of 42 BC, and veterans were settled there under Augustus. It still possessed public and rural land when its bronze Tabula alimentaria was set up, in AD 101.
