= Marcus Manlius Vulso (consular tribune 420 BC) =

Consular tribune of the Roman Republic

Marcus Manlius Vulso was a consular tribune of the Roman Republic in 420 BC.

Manlius belonged to the Manlia gens, an ancient and influential patrician family. Manlius was the son of a Gnaeus Manlius Vulso, who should probably be identified with the consul of 474 BC or an otherwise unattested son of the consul. If the consul is his father then Aulus Manlius Vulso, the decemviri of 451 BC, would have been his brother. Filiations indicate that Publius Manlius Vulso, consular tribune in 400 BC, was the son of Manlius.

== Consular tribune ==
In 420 BC Manlius was elected as consular tribune together with Lucius Furius Medullinus, Aulus Sempronius Atratinus and either Lucius Quinctius Cincinnatus or his brother Titus Quinctius Poenus Cincinnatus (see their individual articles for discussion in regards to identification). This was the first time Manlius held imperium but his colleagues were all experienced holders, having all been consulars previously. For reasons unknown the election of these four consular tribunes were not held by the consuls of the previous year, but rather by a interrex, Lucius Papirius Mugillanus. The year was a year of trials; one against a former consular, Gaius Sempronius Atratinus, cousin of Manlius colleague, and another against Postumia, a vestal virgin. The vestal was tried for misconduct and was acquitted in the presence of the Pontifex maximus, Spurius Minucius. While the former consul, Sempronius, was convicted and forced to heavy fines by the joined efforts of the plebeian tribunes, Aulus Antistius, Sextus Pompilius and Marcus Canuleius. The actions of Manlius and his colleagues during these trials are unknown, but the trial against Sempronius was partially fueled by the actions of his cousin, Manlius colleague, who had presided over the election of the Quaestors and there, in the opinion of the plebeian tribunes, misconducted.

== See also ==
- Manlia gens – Roman family

Political offices
| Preceded by Numerius Fabius Vibulanus; Titus Quinctius Capitolinus Barbatus as Consuls | Consular tribune of the Roman Republic with Lucius Quinctius Cincinnatus, Lucius Furius Medullinus and Aulus Sempronius Atratinus; 420 BC | Succeeded by Agrippa Menenius Lanatus; Publius Lucretius Tricipitinus; Spurius Nautius Rutilus; Gaius Servilius Axilla |
