= Publius Lucretius Tricipitinus (consular tribune 419 BC) =

5th-century BC Roman consular tribune

Publius Lucretius Tricipitinus was a consular tribune of the Roman Republic in 419 and 417 BC.

Lucretius belonged to the Lucretia gens, one of the oldest patrician families. The family had, according to legend, taken part in the overthrow of the Roman monarchy and the establishment of the Republic. Lucretius was the son of Hostus Lucretius Tricipitinus, the consul of 429 BC, and possibly himself the father of Lucius Lucretius Tricipitinus Flavus, the consul of 393 BC.

== Career ==
Lucretius first held the imperium in 419 BC as one of four consular tribunes. His colleagues in the office were Agrippa Menenius Lanatus, Spurius Nautius Rutilus and Gaius Servilius Axilla. Little is recorded of the events during this year.

Similarly little is known of Lucretius second term as consular tribune which he shared with Agrippa Menenius Lanatus, Gaius Servilius Axilla and Spurius Veturius Crassus Cicurinus (or possibly Spurius Rutilius Crassus) in 417 BC.

Lucretius, it can be assumed, would have been occupied in his role as consular tribune in both 419 and 417 by the many conflicts that Rome were embroiled in during this period in time, such as the war with the Aequi and rising tension in regards to calls for new Agrarian laws by the tribunes of the plebs.

== See also ==
- Lucretia gens – Ancient Roman family

Political offices
Preceded by Lucius Quinctius Cincinnatus III or Titus Quinctius Poenus Cincinnatus II; Lucius Furius Medullinus III; Marcus Manlius Vulso; Aulus Sempronius Atratinus II	Military Tribunes with Consular power with Agrippa Menenius Lanatus, Gaius Servilius Axilla, and Spurius Nautius Rutilus; 419 BC	Succeeded by Lucius Sergius Fidenas III; Marcus Papirius Mugillanus; Gaius Servilius Axilla II
Preceded by Lucius Sergius Fidenas; Marcus Papirius Mugillanus; Gaius Servilius Axilla	Military Tribunes with Consular power with Agrippa Menenius Lanatus, Gaius Servilius Axilla, and Spurius Veturius Crassus Cicurinus; 417 BC	Succeeded by Aulus Sempronius Atratinus; Marcus Papirius Mugillanus; Quintus Fabius Vibulanus; Spurius Nautius Rutilus
