= Quintus Fabius Vibulanus (consul 423 BC) =

5th-century BC Roman consul and consular tribune

Quintus Fabius Vibulanus was a consul of the Roman Republic in 423 BC and a consular tribune in 416 and 414 BC.

Fabius belonged to the patrician Fabia gens and the branch known as the Fabii Vibulani, one of the republics oldest and most successful consular families. Fabius it seems was the son of Quintus Fabius Vibulanus, the consul of 467 BC, who had been forced into exile after the fall of the Decemvirate in 449 BC. If this is the case then filiations indicate that Marcus Fabius Vibulanus, consul in 442 BC and Numerius Fabius Vibulanus, consul in 421 BC were his brothers. Marcus Fabius Ambustus, the pontifex maximus mentioned in 390 BC, could possibly be a son of Fabius.

== Career ==
In 423 BC Fabius was elected as consul together with Gaius Sempronius Atratinus. Fabius' colleague Sempronius fought against the Volscians and failed to the extent that he would later be put to trial for "endangering his army". It remains unclear what role Fabius played during this episode and Sempronius was later convicted and fined after a long trial ending in 420 BC.

In 416 BC Fabius was elected as consular tribune together with Aulus Sempronius Atratinus (cousin of his former colleague), Marcus Papirius Mugillanus and Spurius Nautius Rutilus. The actions of the consular tribunes during the year are unknown, the main event described being the failed attempt by the plebeian tribunes, Spurius Maecilius and Marcus Metilius, to enact a new agrarian law.

In 414 BC Fabius was elected for a second time as consular tribune, his third time holding the imperium. His colleagues were Gnaeus Cornelius Cossus, Lucius Valerius Potitus and Publius Postumius Albus Regillensis. The year saw war with the Aequi and initial success for the Romans as Fabius' colleague Postumius captured the city of Bolae. Rising conflict involving a plebeian tribune, Marcus Sextius, and new agrarian reforms resulted in a mutiny against Postumius and the death of both the consular tribune and one of the quaestors, Publius Sestius.

In the year following his second term as consular tribune, Fabius was appointed as Interrex to hold the comitia, resulting in the election of consuls instead of the increasingly common colleges of consular tribunes.

There is a possibility that Fabius, in 412 BC, was once again elected consul. His colleague would have been Gaius Furius Pacilus and little is known of the events during the consulship with the exception of a proposal for an agrarian law put forward by the plebeian tribune Lucius Icilius. The discussion surrounding this consulship is whether the Fabius mentioned as consul is Quintus Fabius Vibulanus, the consul of 423 BC, or another otherwise unattested Fabius, Quintus Fabius Ambustus Vibulanus. The classicist Münzer suggested that both consulships were held by Quintus Fabius Vibulanus while later scholars such as Degrassi and Broughton identify the consuls as two different individuals.

Political offices
Preceded by Appius Claudius Crassus; Lucius Sergius Fidenas II; Spurius Nautius Rutilus; Sextus Julius Iullus as Consular Tribunes	Consul of the Roman Republic; 423 BC; With: Gaius Sempronius Atratinus	Succeeded by Lucius Manlius Capitolinus; Quintus Antonius Merenda; Lucius Papirius Mugillanus as Consular tribunes
Preceded by Publius Lucretius Tricipitinus II; Agrippa Menenius Lanatus II; Gaius Servilius Axilla III; Spurius Veturius Crassus Cicurinus	Military Tribune with Consular power with Spurius Nautius Rutilus II, Marcus Papirius Mugillanus II and Aulus Sempronius Atratinus III; 416 BC	Succeeded by Publius Cornelius Cossus; Gaius Valerius Potitus Volusus; Numerius (or Gnaeus) Fabius Vibulanus; Quintus Quinctius Cincinnatus
Preceded by Publius Cornelius Cossus; Gaius Valerius Potitus Volusus; Numerius (or Gnaeus) Fabius Vibulanus; Quintus Quinctius Cincinnatus	Military Tribune with Consular power II with Gnaeus Cornelius Cossus, Lucius Valerius Potitus and Publius Postumius Albus Regillensis; 414 BC	Succeeded by Aulus (or Marcus) Cornelius Cossus; Lucius Furius Medullinus as Consuls
