= Aulus Sempronius Atratinus (consular tribune 425 BC) =

5th century BC Roman consular tribune and consul

Aulus Sempronius Atratinus was a consular tribune of the Roman Republic in 425, 420, 416 BC and possibly consul in 428 BC.

Sempronius belonged to the patrician branch of the Sempronia gens. He was the son of Lucius Sempronius Atratinus, consul in 444 BC and one of the first censors of the Republic. Gaius Sempronius Atratinus, consul in 423 BC and a contemporary relative was probably a cousin (son of Aulus Sempronius Atratinus) or a younger brother.

== Career ==
In 428 or 427 BC Sempronius held the consulship together with Lucius Quinctius Cincinnatus. This consulship is dubious as it is only mentioned by Diodorus Siculus and is placed in-between the consuls of 428, Aulus Cornelius Cossus and Titus Quinctius Poenus Cincinnatus, and the consuls of 427 BC, Gaius Servilius Structus Ahala and Lucius Papirius Mugillanus. It is possible that they were suffect consuls replacing the college of 428 BC or that all four consuls mentioned in 428 were consular tribunes. All events described by other ancient authors are ascribed to the ordinary consuls of 428 BC.

Sempronius was elected as consular tribune in 425 BC together with (possibly his former consular colleague) Lucius Quinctius Cincinnatus, Lucius Furius Medullinus and Lucius Horatius Barbatus. They oversaw the signing of a twenty year truce with Veii and a three year truce with the Aequi.

Sempronius was re-elected as consular tribune in 420 BC, sharing it with two of his former colleagues, Furius and Quinctius, and a consular newcomer, Marcus Manlius Vulso. In some sources the Quinctius who shared in the college was not Lucius Quinctius, but instead his brother Titus Quinctius Poenus Cincinnatus. Little is known of the events during the year other than that Sempronius presided over the election of the Quaestors.

Sempronius again held the imperium as consular tribune in 416 BC. His colleagues were Marcus Papirius Mugillanus, Quintus Fabius Vibulanus and Spurius Nautius Rutilus. The only known event during the year was the proposal of an agrarian law by two of the Tribunes of the Plebs, which was vetoed by their own colleagues.

== See also ==
- Sempronia gens – Ancient Roman family

Political offices
Preceded by Aulus Cornelius Cossus; Titus Quinctius Poenus Cincinnatus II	Consul (?) of the Roman Republic with Lucius Quinctius Cincinnatus (?); 428 BC (?)	Succeeded by Gaius Servilius Axilla; Lucius Papirius Mugillanus
Preceded by Titus Quinctius Poenus Cincinnatus; Gaius Furius Pacilus Fusus; Marcus Postumius Albinus Regillensis; Aulus Cornelius Cossus	Military Tribunes with Consular power with Lucius Quinctius Cincinnatus II, Lucius Furius Medullinus II and Lucius Horatius Barbatus; 425 BC	Succeeded by Appius Claudius Crassus; Spurius Nautius Rutilus; Lucius Sergius Fidenas II; Sextus Julius Iullus
Preceded by Numerius (or Gnaeus) Fabius Vibulanus; Titus Quinctius Capitolinus Barbatus as Consuls	Military Tribunes with Consular power II with Lucius Quinctius Cincinnatus III or Titus Quinctius Poenus Cincinnatus II, Lucius Furius Medullinus III and Marcus Manlius Vulso; 420 BC	Succeeded by Agrippa Menenius Lanatus; Publius Lucretius Tricipitinus; Spurius Nautius Rutilus; Gaius Servilius Axilla
Preceded by Publius Lucretius Tricipitinus II; Agrippa Menenius Lanatus II; Gaius Servilius Axilla III; Spurius Veturius Crassus Cicurinus	Military Tribunes with Consular power III with Marcus Papirius Mugillanus II, Quintus Fabius Vibulanus and Spurius Nautius Rutilus II; 416 BC	Succeeded by Publius Cornelius Cossus; Gaius Valerius Potitus Volusus; Numerius (or Gnaeus) Fabius Vibulanus; Quintus Quinctius Cincinnatus
