= Lucius Furius Medullinus (consular tribune 432 BC) =

5th-century BC Roman politician and consular tribune

Lucius Furius Medullinus was a Roman politician active during the 5th century BC, and was consular tribune in 432, 425, and 420 BC.

== Family ==
He was a member of the Furii Medullini, a branch of the gens Furia. He was the son of Spurius Furius Medullinus Fusus, consul in 464 BC and the father of Lucius Furius Medullinus, consul in 413 and 409 BC, and of Marcus Furius Camillus, twice consular tribune in 403 and 381 BC. His complete name is Lucius Furius Sp. f. Medullinus.

== Biography ==
=== First consular tribunate ===
Medullinus was elected military tribune with consular power in 432 BC with two others: Lucius Pinarius Mamercinus and Spurius Postumius Albus Regillensis. According to Livy, the three tribunes were all newly made patricians. (Note: Livy, Roman History, IV. 25) The plague did not seem to take many lives and because wheat was imported the year passed without the risk of famine. Nevertheless, social tensions remained a concern and the plebs regretted that no plebeian had been elected as a consular tribune so even that the institution of that new judiciary must have responded in kind. At the end of their term the differences between plebeian and patrician candidates was made clear: the consular tribunes had signed in a new law, the Lex Pinaria Furia Postumia, which forced all candidates to carry a toga, the distinctive mark linked to their social rank. They organized the consular elections for the following year in the continuation of a Senatus consultum. (Note: Livy, Roman History, IV. 25.14)

=== Second consular tribunate ===
In 425 BC, Medullinus was again made military tribune with consular power, with Lucius Quinctius Cincinnatus, Aulus Sempronius Atratinus, and Lucius Horatius Barbatus. Veientes had agreed to a twenty-year truce whereas which the Aequi obtained three years of peace. (Note: Livy, Roman History, IV. 35)

=== Third consular tribunate ===
In 420 BC, Medullinus was elected consular tribune for the third time, once again with Lucius Quinctius Cincinnatus and Aulus Sempronius Aratinus, and with a new colleague, Marcus Manlius Vulso, all patricians. The election of the quaestors was conducted and overseen by Aulus Sempronius Atratinus who had opened the election to patrician candidates, which provoked the anger of tribunes of the plebs Aulus Antistius, Sextus Pompilius, and Marcus Canuleius. They moved to punish Gaius Sempronius Atratinus (consul in 423 BC), the cousin of Aulus Sempronius Atratinus, for his conduct of the election for quaestors. (Note: Livy, Roman History, IV. 44) The tribunes reproached Sempronius with the errors committed during the war against the Volsci at the time of his consulship and made him pay amends with a fine of 15,000 asses.

It is during the third tribunal of Lucius Furius that Medullinus held the trial of the Vestal Postumia, suspected of deviant behavior, but who was finally acquitted.

== Bibliography ==
=== Ancient authors ===
- Titus Livius in Roman History book 4.

=== Modern authors ===
- Broughton, Thomas Robert Shannon (1951), The Magistrates of the Roman Republic, Philological Monograph No. 15, New York: American Philological Association, ISBN 0-89130-811-3
- Forsythe, Gary (2005), A Critical History of Early Rome: From Prehistory to the First Punic War, University of California Press, ISBN 0520249917

Political offices
Preceded by Marcus Fabius Vibulanus; Marcus Foslius Flaccinator; Lucius Sergius Fidenas	Roman consular tribune 432 BC with Lucius Pinarius Mamercinus, Spurius Postumius Albus Regillensis	Succeeded by Titus Quinctius Poenus Cincinnatus; Gaius Julius Mento as consuls
Preceded by Gaius Furius Pacilus Fusus; Titus Quinctius Poenus Cincinnatus; Marcus Postumius Albinus Regillensis; Aulus Cornelius Cossus	Roman consular tribune II; 425 BC with Aulus Sempronius Atratinus, Lucius Quinctius Cincinnatus II, Lucius Horatius Barbatus	Succeeded by Appius Claudius Crassus; Spurius Nautius Rutilus; Lucius Sergius Fidenas; Sextus Julius Iullus
Preceded by Numerius Fabius Vibulanus; Titus Quinctius Capitolinus Barbatus as consuls	Roman consular tribune III; 420 BC with Quinctius Cincinnatus, Marcus Manlius Vulso, Aulus Sempronius Atratinus	Succeeded by Agrippa Menenius Lanatus; Publius Lucretius Tricipitinus; Spurius Nautius Rutilus; Gaius Servilius Axilla
