= Marcus Papirius Mugillanus =

5th century BC Roman consul

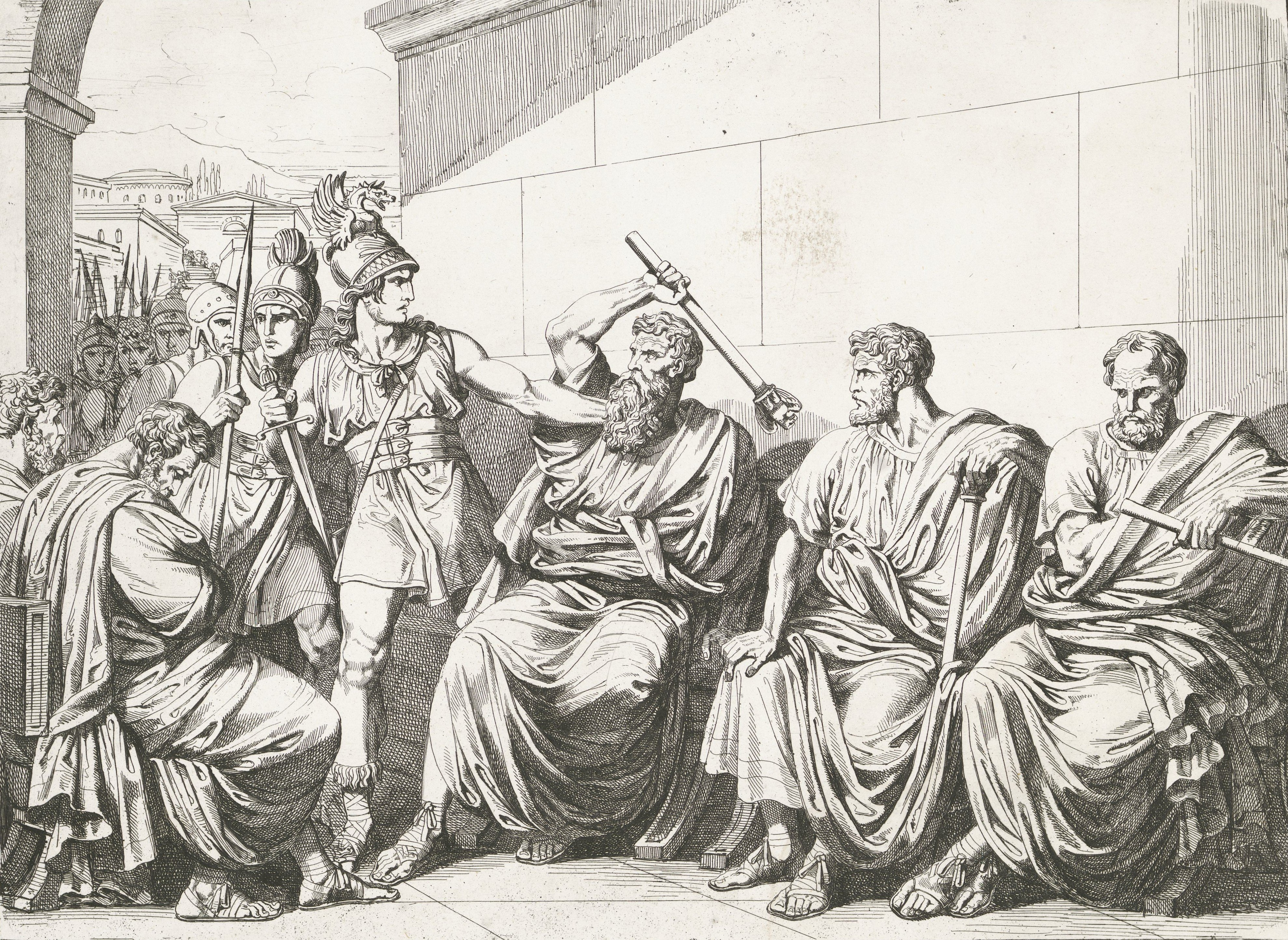
Death of Marcus Papirius by Gauls (Bartolomeo Pinelli, 1818)

Marcus Papirius Mugillanus was a consular tribune in 418 and 416 BC, and perhaps consul of the Roman Republic in 411.

Papirius belonged to the Papiria gens, one of the oldest patrician families. The family had, according to legend, been among the first families to hold the most prestigious religious offices, such as Pontifex maximus and Rex Sacrorum. Papirius was the son of Lucius Papirius Mugillanus, the consul of 427 BC, and possibly himself the father of Lucius Papirius Mugillanus, the consular tribune in 382, 380 and 376 BC.

== Career ==
Papirius first held the imperium in 418 BC as one of three consular tribunes. His colleagues in the office were Lucius Sergius Fidenas and Gaius Servilius Axilla, both experienced generals and repeated consulars. The year saw war against the Aequi and the Labici which resulted, after the defeat of Papirius colleague Sergius, to the appointment of a dictator, Quintus Servilius Priscus Fidenas. Servilius, the dictator, appointed his relative, Axilla, to the office of magister equitum, and together they defeated both their enemies resulting in the capture of Labici. Papirius father, the consul of 427 BC, was elected as censor during this year.

Papirius was again elected as consular tribune in 416 BC, this time sharing the office with Aulus Sempronius Atratinus, Quintus Fabius Vibulanus and Spurius Nautius Rutilus. The whole college was exceptionally experienced and consisted solely of former consulars. The year saw the proposal of a new agrarian law by the plebeian tribunes, Spurius Maecilius and Marcus Metilius, which was vetoed by their own colleagues.

== Mugillanus or Atratinus? - Consulship of 411 BC ==
There exists some conflicting traditions in regards to the cognomen of the consul in 411 BC. The consul has the cognomen of Mugillanus in both the Chronograph of 354 and the Fasti Hydatius; however, the ancient historian Livy, drawing on an ancient document known as the libri lintei, reports the consul of that year as having the cognomen Atratinus. No help can be gained from the Fasti Capitolini as it is not preserved for this year. While the Classicist Broughton argues that the evidence of Mugillanus in the two later fasti is an indication that the Fasti Capitolini would have had the same name, names the consul of 411 BC as Marcus Papirius Mugillanus and concludes he is the same person as the consular tribune of 418 and 416 BC. In opposition R.M. Ogilvie, noting that the cognomen of Atratinus is otherwise unattested among the Papiria and seems to be exclusively used by another gens, the Sempronia, argues that the source of the Fasti Capitolini is corrupt at this point and "the original list of 411 will have been a college of three consular tribunes, Papirius, Sempronius and Nautius". The identity of the Papirius of 411 BC will most likely remain unrecoverable. If Mugillanus is to be identified as the consul in 411 BC he would have shared the office with his former colleague Nautius in a consulship beset by pestillence and famine.

== See also ==
- Papiria gens – Ancient Roman family

Political offices
| Preceded by Agrippa Menenius Lanatus; Publius Lucretius Tricipitinus; Spurius Nautius Rutilus; Gaius Servilius Axilla | Military Tribunes with Consular power with Lucius Sergius Fidenas III and Gaius Servilius Axilla II; 418 BC | Succeeded by Agrippa Menenius Lanatus II; Publius Lucretius Tricipitinus II; Spurius Veturius Crassus Cicurinus; Gaius Servilius Axilla III |
| Preceded by Publius Lucretius Tricipitinus II; Agrippa Menenius Lanatus II; Gaius Servilius Axilla III; Spurius Veturius Crassus Cicurinus | Military Tribunes with Consular power II with Spurius Nautius Rutilus II, Quintus Fabius Vibulanus and Aulus Sempronius Atratinus III; 416 BC | Succeeded by Publius Cornelius Cossus; Gaius Valerius Potitus Volusus; Numerius (or Gnaeus) Fabius Vibulanus; Quintus Quinctius Cincinnatus |
| Preceded by Quintus Fabius Vibulanus Ambustus; Gaius Furius Pacilus | Consul with Spurius Nautius Rutilus; 411 BC | Succeeded by Manius Aemilius Mamercinus; Gaius Valerius Potitus Volusus |
