= Quintus Quinctius Cincinnatus (consular tribune 415 BC) =

5th century BC Roman Republican consular tribune

Quintus Quinctius Cincinnatus was a consular tribune in 415 and 405 BC of the Roman Republic.

Quinctius belonged to the Quinctia gens, one of the oldest and possibly the most influential and powerful patrician gens of the early Republic. Quinctius branch, the Cincinnati, traced their descent from the legendary dictator Lucius Quinctius Cincinnatus. His father was the son of the dictator and also named Lucius Quinctius Cincinnatus. No filiations survive in our sources in regards to Quinctius relation to later Quinctia but there is a possibility that his namesake Quintus Quinctius Cincinnatus, consular tribune in 369 BC, is a son or grandson.

== Career ==
Quinctius first held the imperium in 415 BC as one of four consular tribunes. His colleagues in the office were Publius Cornelius Cossus, Numerius Fabius Vibulanus and Gaius Valerius Potitus Volusus, with the exception of Fabius, all the consular tribunes were newcomers to the imperium. The actions of the consular tribunes is little known but there was a proposal by the tribune of the plebs, Lucius Decius, to colonize Bolae which was vetoed by his own colleagues.

Quinctius became consular tribune for a second time in 405 BC as part of a large and experience consular college. His colleagues were Titus Quinctius Capitolinus Barbatus (a distant relative), Gaius Julius Iulus, Aulus Manlius Vulso Capitolinus, Lucius Furius Medullinus and Manius Aemilius Mamercinus. The consular tribunes continued the war against the Veii that had begun the previous year and succeeded in surrounding and besieging the city. This siege, known as the Siege of Veii, would last for ten years.

== Conflicting traditions & Lustrum XV ==
Diodorus Siculus in his Bibliotheca historica does not name Quinctius as one of the six consular tribunes of 405 BC. Diodorus' account only includes three names, Capitolinus, Furius and Aemilius, but mentions that the college consisted of six members. As other sources agree on the number of consular tribunes and on the three remaining names not listed by Diodorus, it can therefore be assumed that Quinctius should be included in the college of 405 BC.

Quinctius could have been one of the unknown censors who completed the lustrum in between 417 BC and 404 BC as suggested by the classicist Jaakko Suolahti. Suolahti, drawing from the fact that the census described in 403 BC is numbered lustrum XVI and counting from lustrum X which was held in 459 BC only gives us four pairs of censors (in 443, 435, 430 and 418 BC), thus a missing lustrum XV. Additionally drawing upon a gap in the Fasti Capitolini from 414 to 410 BC the censorship can likely be placed within this timeframe, with Suolahti leaning towards the year 410 BC. Suolahti's main suggestions for these unknown censors are Spurius Nautius Rutilus and Manius Aemilius Mamercinus but adds Quinctius, as one of a few viable candidates. While Suolahti argues for the existence of these unknown censors and lustrum XV, it is noted by the author himself that these possible candidates are simply educated guesses based on the suitability of the candidates to the office and are in the author's words "mere suppositions".

== See also ==
- Quinctia gens – Ancient Roman family

Political offices
Preceded by Aulus Sempronius Atratinus; Marcus Papirius Mugillanus; Quintus Fabius Vibulanus; Spurius Nautius Rutilus	Consular tribune of the Roman Republic with Numerius Fabius Vibulanus; Publius Cornelius Cossus; Gaius Valerius Potitus Volusus; 415 BC	Succeeded by Gnaeus Cornelius Cossus; Lucius Valerius Potitus; Quintus Fabius Vibulanus; Publius Postumius Albus Regillensis
Preceded by Publius Cornelius Rutilus Cossus; Gnaeus Cornelius Cossus; Numerius Fabius Ambustus; Lucius Valerius Potitus	Consular tribune of the Roman Republic with Titus Quinctius Capitolinus Barbatus; Gaius Julius Iulus; Aulus Manlius Vulso Capitolinus; Lucius Furius Medullinus; Manius Aemilius Mamercinus; 405 BC	Succeeded by Gaius Valerius Potitus Volusus; Manius Sergius Fidenas; Publius Cornelius Maluginensis; Gnaeus Cornelius Cossus; Caeso Fabius Ambustus; Spurius Nautius Rutilus
