= Foslia gens =

Ancient Roman family

The gens Foslia, later Folia, was a patrician family at ancient Rome. The first of the gens to appear in history was Marcus Foslius Flaccinator, consular tribune in 433 BC.

== Praenomina used ==
The only praenomina known to have been used by the Foslii are Marcus and Gaius.

== Branches and cognomina ==
The only family name of the Foslia gens appearing in history was Flaccinator. This family was extinct at an early date.

== Members ==
This list includes abbreviated praenomina. For an explanation of this practice, see filiation.

- Marcus Foslius Flaccinator, tribunus militum consulari potestate in 433 BC.
- Marcus Foslius Flaccinator, grandfather of the consul of 318 BC.
- Gaius Foslius M. f. Flaccinator, father of the consul of 318 BC.
- Marcus Foslius C. f. M. n. Flaccinator, magister equitum in 320 BC, he and the dictator Gaius Maenius were accused of conspiring against the Republic, and resigned, but were acquitted by the consuls. Foslius was consul in 318, and was nominated magister equitum a second time in 314. The details of his service differ between Livy and the consular fasti.

== See also ==
- List of Roman gentes
