= Agrippa Menenius Lanatus (consul 439 BC) =

Roman senator, consul in 439 BC

Agrippa Menenius Lanatus was consul of the Roman Republic in 439 BC and possibly the consular tribune of 419 and 417 BC.

Menenius belonged to the Menenia gens. His father was Titus Menenius Lanatus, consul in 477 BC. Following filiations he was probably the brother of Lucius Menenius Lanatus, consul in 440 BC, and uncle of Licinius Menenius Lanatus.

== Career ==
Menenius was one of three patricians sent to lead the colonization of Ardea by the orders of the consuls Marcus Fabius Vibulanus and Postumus Aebutius Helva Cornicen in 442 BC. The two other members of the triumviri coloniae deducendae were Titus Cloelius Siculus and Marcus Aebutius Helva.

In 439 BC Menenius was elected consul together with the elderly Titus Quinctius Capitolinus Barbatus. The year saw a large conspiracy led by Spurius Maelius and the appointment of Lucius Quinctius Cincinnatus as dictator for a second and final time.

Twenty years later in 419 BC, Menenius or possibly another Agrippa Menenius Lanatus, son of Titus Menenius Lanatus, consul in 452 BC, was elected as consular tribune. This consular tribune was re-elected in 417 BC.

== See also ==
- Menenia gens

Political offices
Preceded by Proculus Geganius Macerinus; Lucius Menenius Lanatus	Roman consul 439 BC; With: Titus Quinctius Capitolinus Barbatus VI	Succeeded by Mamercus Aemilius Mamercinus; Lucius Quinctius Cincinnatus; Lucius Julius Iullus as consular tribunes
Preceded by Lucius Quinctius Cincinnatus III or Titus Quinctius Poenus Cincinnatus II; Lucius Furius Medullinus III; Marcus Manlius Vulso; Aulus Sempronius Atratinus II	Military Tribunes with Consular power with Publius Lucretius Tricipitinus, Spurius Nautius Rutilus and Gaius Servilius Axilla; 419 BC	Succeeded by Lucius Sergius Fidenas; Marcus Papirius Mugillanus; Gaius Servilius Axilla
Preceded by Lucius Sergius Fidenas; Marcus Papirius Mugillanus; Gaius Servilius Axilla	Military Tribunes with Consular power with Publius Lucretius Tricipitinus, Spurius Veturius Crassus Cicurinus and Gaius Servilius Axilla; 417 BC	Succeeded by Aulus Sempronius Atratinus (consular tribune 428 BC); Marcus Papirius Mugillanus; Quintus Fabius Vibulanus (consul 423 BC); Spurius Nautius Rutilus (consular tribune 419 BC)
