= Spurius Nautius Rutilus (consular tribune 419 BC) =

Roman patrician and consular tribune

Spurius Nautius Rutilus was a consul of the Roman Republic in 411 and a consular tribune in 419, 416 and 404 BC.

Nautius belonged to the Nautia gens, an old but rather small patrician family. Nautius was the son of a Spurius Nautius Rutilus, the consular tribune in 424 BC and probably the forefather of later Nautia such as Spurius Nautius Rutilus, consul in 316 BC.

== Career ==
Nautius first held the imperium in 419 BC as one of four consular tribunes. His colleagues in the office were Agrippa Menenius Lanatus, Publius Lucretius Tricipitinus and Gaius Servilius Axilla. In this year, there was a conspiracy among the slaves of the city to revolt and take the Capitoline hill, but it was revealed to the senate and tribunes by two slaves who were accomplices in the plot. The ringleaders of the conspiracy were crucified and as a reward for their loyal service, the two slaves who had divulged the plot were given their freedom as well as a considerable sum of money.

Nautius was elected for a second term as consular tribune in 416 BC together with Aulus Sempronius Atratinus, Marcus Papirius Mugillanus and Quintus Fabius Vibulanus. The year saw the proposal of a new agrarian law by the tribunes of the plebs, Spurius Maecilius and Marcus Metilius, which was vetoed by their own colleagues. The actions of the consulars in regards to this law is unknown.

In 411 BC Nautius was elected together with his former colleague Papirius to the consulship. As consuls they oversaw Rome during a period of famine and pestilence. Little is recorded of the events during this year but it was in the middle of a period of strife in Rome in regards to cries for agrarian reforms and wars against the Aequi and the Volscians.

Nautius would be elected for a third and final term as consular tribune in 404 BC. His colleagues were Gaius Valerius Potitus Volusus, Manius Sergius Fidenas, Publius Cornelius Maluginensis, Gnaeus Cornelius Cossus and Caeso Fabius Ambustus. The year saw war with the Volscians and Veii. The Volscians were defeated and the city of Artena was captured while the siege of Veii, which had begun the previous year, was maintained. In addition to their successful enterprises in the wars an expedition was sent to colonize Velitrae.

== Conflicting traditions ==
There exists some uncertainty if Spurius Nautius Rutilus was the consul of 411 BC or if that office should be ascribed to an otherwise unattested brother of his, Gaius Nautius Rutilus. The ancient records disagree in regards to the praenomen of the consul with Livy and Cassiodorus having him named Gaius while Diodorus Siculus has him named Spurius. The name of the consular tribune is attested as Spurius as shown in the Fasti Capitolini and the works of Livy and Diodorus. The Fasti is not preserved for the year 411 BC and other sources does not specify a praenomen. Following this the classicist Broughton identifies the consul of 411 as the same individual as the consular tribune of 419 BC.

== See also ==
- Nautia gens – Roman gens

Political offices
Preceded by Lucius Quinctius Cincinnatus or Titus Quinctius Poenus Cincinnatus; Lucius Furius Medullinus; Marcus Manlius Vulso; Aulus Sempronius Atratinus	Military Tribunes with Consular power with Publius Lucretius Tricipitinus, Agrippa Menenius Lanatus, and Gaius Servilius Axilla; 419 BC	Succeeded by Lucius Sergius Fidenas; Marcus Papirius Mugillanus; Gaius Servilius Axilla
Preceded by Publius Lucretius Tricipitinus; Agrippa Menenius Lanatus; Gaius Servilius Axilla; Spurius Veturius Crassus Cicurinus	Military Tribunes with Consular power with Marcus Papirius Mugillanus, Quintus Fabius Vibulanus, and Aulus Sempronius Atratinus; 416 BC	Succeeded by Publius Cornelius Cossus; Gaius Valerius Potitus Volusus; Numerius Fabius Vibulanus; Quintus Quinctius Cincinnatus
Preceded by Quintus Fabius Vibulanus Ambustus; Gaius Furius Pacilus	Consul with Marcus Papirius Atratinus or Marcus Papirius Mugillanus; 411 BC	Succeeded by Manius Aemilius Mamercinus; Gaius Valerius Potitus Volusus
Preceded by Titus Quinctius Capitolinus Barbatus, Aulus Manlius Vulso Capitolinus, Quintus Quinctius Cincinnatus II, Lucius Furius Medullinus II, Gaius Iulius Iullus II, Manius Aemilius Mamercinus	Military Tribunes with Consular power with Gaius Valerius Potitus Volusus III, Gnaeus Cornelius Cossus II, Manius Sergius Fidenas, Publius Cornelius Maluginensis, and Caeso Fabius Ambustus; 404 BC	Succeeded by Manius Aemilius Mamercinus II, Marcus Quinctilius Varus, Lucius Valerius Potitus III, Lucius Iulius Iullus, Appius Claudius Crassus Inregillensis, Marcus Furius Fusus
