= Quintus Antonius Merenda =

Roman consular tribune in 422 BC

Quintus Antonius Merenda was a consular tribune of the early Roman Republic in 422 BC.

Antonius belonged to the Antonia gens. Antonius was the son of Titus Antonius Merenda, one of the decemviri who were forced into exile in 449 BC after the overthrow of the second decemvirate.

== Consular tribune ==
In 422 BC Antonius was elected as consular tribune together with Lucius Manlius Capitolinus and Lucius Papirius Mugillanus. The year saw the beginning of the trial against the former consul Gaius Sempronius Atratinus, who had in 423 BC unsuccessfully fought against the Volscians. The trial was led by the plebeian tribunes and the prosecutor Lucius Hortentius. The trial would drag on and not reach a conclusion until 420 BC. The actions of the consular tribunes of this year was not recorded.

== Was Antonius a plebeian or a patrician? ==
There exists some discussion about whether Antonius was a plebeian or a patrician, as the gens, the Antonii, is an plebeian gens in the late Republic. The two known Antonii of the early Republic, Quintus and his father Titus, are traditionally seen as patricians, as there were no plebeian consuls prior to 366 BC. Titus, the decemvir, is not listed by Dionysius as plebeian, but three of his colleagues are mentioned as plebeian. The classicist Broughton argues that Titus and another colleague from the gens Rabuleia, Manius Rabuleius, both should be considered plebeians, and that the second decemvirate consisted of equal proportions of patricians and plebeians. Secondly, even though Livy reaffirms that the first consular tribune of plebeian origin was elected in 400 BC there are indications of several plebeian names among the consular tribunes prior to this. This has led several classicists, such as Broughton, to consider Quintus and his father as plebeians and that no patrician branch of the Antonia gens ever existed.

== See also ==
- Manlia gens – Roman family

Political offices
Preceded by Gaius Sempronius Atratinus; Quintus Fabius Vibulanus as Consuls	Consular tribune of the Roman Republic with Lucius Manlius Capitolinus; Lucius Papirius Mugillanus; 422 BC	Succeeded by Numerius Fabius Vibulanus; Titus Quinctius Capitolinus Barbatus as Consuls
