= Appius Claudius Crassus (consular tribune 424 BC) =

5th-century BC patrician and consular tribune

Appius (or Titus) Claudius Crassus was a consular tribune of the Roman Republic in 424 BC.

Claudius belonged to the patrician Claudia gens. He was the son of the infamous Appius Claudius Crassus, who had been the leading figure of the group known as the Decemviri from 451 to 449 BC before taking his life after they were overthrown. Following filiations Claudius is the father of Appius Claudius Crassus, consular tribune in 403 BC. Claudius also had a younger brother named Publius Claudius Crassus.

== Career ==
In 424 BC Claudius was elected as consular tribune together with Spurius Nautius Rutilus, Lucius Sergius Fidenas and Sextus Julius Iullus. Claudius remained in Rome while his colleagues led armies in the field, thus Claudius held and completed the election of the consuls of the following year. During his year in office he was a fierce opponent of the plebeians and their tribunes. There is some uncertainty in regards to his praenomen, Livy names him Appius and Didorus Siculus has him named Titus.

== See also ==
- Claudia gens – Ancient Roman family

Political offices
Preceded by Aulus Sempronius Atratinus; Lucius Quinctius Cincinnatus II; Lucius Furius Medullinus II; Lucius Horatius Barbatus as Consular Tribunes	Consular tribune of the Roman Republic with Spurius Nautius Rutilus; Lucius Sergius Fidenas; Sextus Julius Iulus; 424 BC	Succeeded by Gaius Sempronius Atratinus; Quintus Fabius Vibulanus as Consuls
