= Gaius Furius Pacilus =

Gaius Furius Pacilus may refer to:

- Gaius Furius Pacilus (consul 251 BC), Roman consul
- Gaius Furius Pacilus (consul 412 BC), Roman consul
- Gaius Furius Pacilus Fusus, Roman statesman

== See also ==
- Gaius Furius Sabinius Aquila Timesitheus, Roman imperial officer
- Gaius Furius Chresimus, Greek farmer and Roman freedman
