= Menenia gens =

Ancient Roman family

The gens Menenia was an ancient and very illustrious patrician house at ancient Rome from the earliest days of the Roman Republic to the first half of the fourth century BC. The first of the family to obtain the consulship was Agrippa Menenius Lanatus in 503 BC. The gens eventually drifted into obscurity, although a few Menenii are still attested in the epigraphy of the late Republic and imperial times.

== Origin ==
During the first secession of the plebs in 493 BC, Agrippa Menenius Lanatus, the former consul, was despatched by the Senate as an emissary to the plebeians, who were gathered on the Mons Sacer. He said that he was sprung from the plebs, although he and several generations of his descendants held the consulship at a time when, according to the historians of the late Republic, it was open only to the patricians. This suggests that the Menenii had recently been made patricians, probably during the reign of one of the later Roman kings.

== Praenomina ==
The Menenii are known to have used the praenomina Agrippa, Gaius, Titus and Lucius. Together with the gens Furia, they were amongst the only patrician families to make regular use of the praenomen Agrippa, which was later revived as a cognomen in many families. For this reason, later sources erroneously refer to members of this gens as Menenius Agrippa.

Licinus, the praenomen of one of the Menenii, was likewise a rare name, meaning upturned, originally refererring to the bearer's nose. This was ordinarily a cognomen, or surname, though here used as a praenomen. It is frequently confused with the nomen Licinius, which was probably derived from it, although perhaps connected to the Etruscan lecne, which seems to have been its equivalent. Licinus is expressly given in the Fasti Capitolini, while Livy renders it as Licinius, and some later historians have amended it to the more common praenomen Lucius.

== Branches and cognomina ==
The only cognomen associated with the Menenii of the early Republic is Lanatus. This surname is derived from the Latin adjective, meaning "wooly", and perhaps originally referred to a person with particularly fine, curly, or abundant hair.

== Members ==
This list includes abbreviated praenomina. For an explanation of this practice, see filiation.

- Gaius Menenius Lanatus, father of Agrippa Menenius Lanatus, the consul of 503 BC.
- Agrippa Menenius C. f. Lanatus, consul in 503 BC, and emissary to the plebeians during the first secession in 493.
- Titus Menenius Agripp. f. C. n. Lanatus, consul in 477 BC, failed to intervene on behalf of the Fabii at the Battle of the Cremera.
- Agrippa Menenius Agripp. f. C. n. Lanatus, father of Titus Menenius Lanatus, the consul of 452 BC.
- Titus Menenius Agripp. f. Agripp. n. Lanatus, consul in 452 BC.
- Lucius Menenius T. f. Agripp. n. Lanatus, possibly consul in 440 BC. (Note: Livy and Cassiodorus give him the praenomen Lucius. Diodorus names him Titus, and the Chronograph of 354 says this was his second consulship, which would make him identical to the consul of 452.)
- Agrippa Menenius T. f. Agripp. n. Lanatus, consul in 439 BC, and consular tribune in 419 and 417 BC.
- Titus Menenius T. f. Agripp. n. Lanatus, father of Licinus Menenius Lanatus, the consular tribune of 387 BC.
- Licinus Menenius T. f. T. n. Lanatus, consular tribune in 387, 380, 378, and 376 BC. (Note: Livy gives his praenomen as Licinius, apparently confusing the rare praenomen with the common nomen gentilicium. Diodorus, apparently unfamiliar with the name, amends it to Lucius, and in one passage to Gaius.)
- Menenius, proscribed by the triumvirs in 43 BC, but rescued from death by the self-devotion of one of his slaves.

=== Others ===
- Gaius Menenius C. f., one of several equites named in an inscription from Samothrace in Thracia, dating from 100 BC.
- Gaius Menenius C. f. Priscus, a native of Luca in Etruria, a soldier in the tenth urban cohort at Rome during the consulship of Rufinus and Quadratus, AD 142. He served in a century led by a centurion named Spurius.
- Menenius Adjutor, a soldier in the Legio XXII Primigenia, along with Gaius Appuleius Saturninus made an offering in honour of the Lares at Mogontiacum in Germania Superior, according to an inscription from the first half of the third century.

=== Undated Menenii ===
- Lucius Menenius L. l. Antiochus, a freedman buried at Rome, along with several others, including the freedmen Lucius Menenius Demetrius and Lucius Menenius Stabilio.
- Menenius Crescens, buried at Castellum Phuensium in Numidia.
- Lucius Menenius Ɔ. l. Demetrius, a freedman buried at Rome, along with several others, including the freedmen Lucius Menenius Antiochus and Lucius Menenius Stabilio.
- Aulus Menenius Hippolytus, dedicated a tomb at Rome for his wife, Nymphidia Margaris. The inscription may be a forgery.
- Menenius Rufus, buried at Rome, was perhaps related to Publius Clodius Rufus, named immediately before him in the same inscription.
- Lucius Menenius L. l. Stabilio, a freedman buried at Rome, along with several others, including the freedmen Lucius Menenius Antiochus and Lucius Menenius Demetrius.
- Menenia Urbica, buried at Rome, aged thirty years, eight months, and twenty-two days, in a tomb built by her husband, Marcus Aurelius Eutyches.

== See also ==
- List of Roman gentes

== Bibliography ==
- Diodorus Siculus, Bibliotheca Historica (Library of History).
- Titus Livius (Livy), Ab Urbe Condita (History of Rome).
- Dionysius of Halicarnassus, Romaike Archaiologia.
- Appianus Alexandrinus (Appian), Bellum Civile (The Civil War).
- Aulus Gellius, Noctes Atticae (Attic Nights).
- Joannes Zonaras, Epitome Historiarum (Epitome of History).
- Luigi Lanzi, Saggio di Lingua Etrusca e di Altre Antiche d'Italia (The Study of Etruscan and other Ancient Italian Languages), Stamperia Pagliarini, Rome (1789).
- Dictionary of Greek and Roman Biography and Mythology, William Smith, ed., Little, Brown and Company, Boston (1849).
- Theodor Mommsen et alii, Corpus Inscriptionum Latinarum (The Body of Latin Inscriptions, abbreviated CIL), Berlin-Brandenburgische Akademie der Wissenschaften (1853–present).
- René Cagnat et alii, L'Année épigraphique (The Year in Epigraphy, abbreviated AE), Presses Universitaires de France (1888–present).
- George Davis Chase, "The Origin of Roman Praenomina", in Harvard Studies in Classical Philology, vol. VIII (1897).
- Broughton, T. Robert S. (1952–1986). The Magistrates of the Roman Republic. American Philological Association.
