= Lucius Quinctius Cincinnatus (consular tribune) =

5th century BC consular tribune of the Roman Republic

Personal details
- Born: Unknown Ancient Rome
- Died: Unknown Ancient Rome
- Children: Quintus Quinctius Cincinnatus; Lucius Quinctius Cincinnatus (father of the consular tribune of 386 BC)
- Parent: Lucius Quinctius Cincinnatus

Lucius Quinctius Cincinnatus was a consular tribune of the Roman Republic in 438, 425, 420 BC and possibly consul in 428 BC.

Quinctius belonged to the powerful Quinctia gens and was the son of one of the early republic's most famous figures, the twice appointed dictator Lucius Quinctius Cincinnatus. He was probably the elder brother of Titus Quinctius Poenus Cincinnatus, consul in 431 BC. Filiations indicate that he was the father of Quintus Quinctius Cincinnatus, consular tribune in 415 BC, and possibly a Lucius Quinctius Cincinnatus who was father to Lucius Quinctius Cincinnatus, consular tribune in 386, 385 and 377 BC.

== Career ==
Quinctius was elected consular tribune in 438 BC together with Mamercus Aemilius Mamercinus and Lucius Julius Iullus. They continued hostilities against the Fidenates and their leader Lars Tolumnius, which would result in the death of four Roman legates sent as ambassadors. The four legates, Gaius Fulcinius, Cloelius Tullus, Spurius Antius and Lucius Roscius, would later be honoured with statues on the Rostra.

In the following year, the war with the Fidenates was escalated and a dictator was appointed to handle the crisis. The dictator was the former consular colleague of Quinctius, Mamercus Aemilius Mamercinus. Aemilius selected Quinctius to be his second-in-command as magister equitum. They fought and defeated the Veii, Falerii and Fidenae, and Aemilius was granted a triumph.

In 428 or 427 BC Quinctius held the consulship together with Aulus Sempronius Atratinus. This consulship is dubious as it is only mentioned by Diodorus Siculus and is placed in between the consuls of 428 BC, Aulus Cornelius Cossus and Titus Quinctius Poenus Cincinnatus, and the consuls of 427 BC, Gaius Servilius Structus Ahala and Lucius Papirius Mugillanus. It is possible that they were suffect consuls replacing the college of 428 BC or that all four consuls mentioned in 428 BC were consular tribunes. All events described by other ancient authors are ascribed to the ordinary consuls of 428 BC.

Quinctius was re-elected as consular tribune in 425 BC together with Aulus Sempronius Atratinus, Lucius Furius Medullinus and Lucius Horatius Barbatus. They oversaw the signing of a twenty year truce with Veii and a three year truce with the Aequi.

Quinctius, or his brother Titus, was elected as consular tribune in 420 BC. Livy and the Chronograph of 354 has Lucius Quinctius, while the Fasti Capitolini points towards Titus. Scholars generally favour Lucius Quinctius as the consular tribune of 420 BC and that the Fasti has confused the two brothers. The college, including Quinctius, consisted of two of his former colleagues from 425, Furius and Sempronius, and a consular newcomer, Marcus Manlius Vulso. Little is known about the events of the year other than that Sempronius presided over the election of the Quaestors.

== See also ==
- Quinctia gens – Ancient Roman family

Political offices
Preceded by Agrippa Menenius Lanatus (consul 439 BC); Titus Quinctius Capitolinus Barbatus as Consuls	Military Tribunes with Consular power with Mamercus Aemilius Mamercinus and Lucius Julius Iulus (consul 430 BC); 438 BC	Succeeded by Marcus Geganius Macerinus; Lucius Sergius Fidenas as Consuls
Preceded by Aulus Cornelius Cossus; Titus Quinctius Poenus Cincinnatus	Consul of the Roman Republic with Aulus Sempronius Atratinus (consular tribune 425 BC); 428 BC	Succeeded by Gaius Servilius Structus Ahala (consul 427 BC); Lucius Papirius Mugillanus (consul 427 BC)
Preceded by Titus Quinctius Poenus Cincinnatus; Gaius Furius Pacilus Fusus; Marcus Postumius Albinus Regillensis; Aulus Cornelius Cossus	Military Tribunes with Consular power with Aulus Sempronius Atratinus (consular tribune 425 BC), Lucius Furius Medullinus (consular tribune) and Lucius Horatius Barbatus; 425 BC	Succeeded by Appius Claudius Crassus (consular tribune 424 BC); Spurius Nautius Rutilus (consular tribune 424 BC); Lucius Sergius Fidenas; Sextus Julius Iullus
Preceded by Numerius Fabius Vibulanus; Titus Quinctius Capitolinus Barbatus (consul 421 BC) as Consuls	Military Tribunes with Consular power with Aulus Sempronius Atratinus (consular tribune 425 BC), Lucius Furius Medullinus (consular tribune) and Marcus Manlius Vulso; 420 BC	Succeeded by Agrippa Menenius Lanatus (consul 439 BC); Publius Lucretius Tricipitinus; Spurius Nautius Rutilus (consular tribune 419 BC); Gaius Servilius Axilla
