= Quintillus (cognomen) =

Quintillus is an ancient Roman cognomen. Notable people with this cognomen include:

- Marcus Aurelius Claudius Quintillus (died 270), Roman emperor
- Marcus Peducaeus Plautius Quintillus (died 205), Roman noble
- Plautius Quintillus (died by 175), Roman senator

== See also ==
- Quinctia gens
