= Quinctia gens =

Ancient Roman family

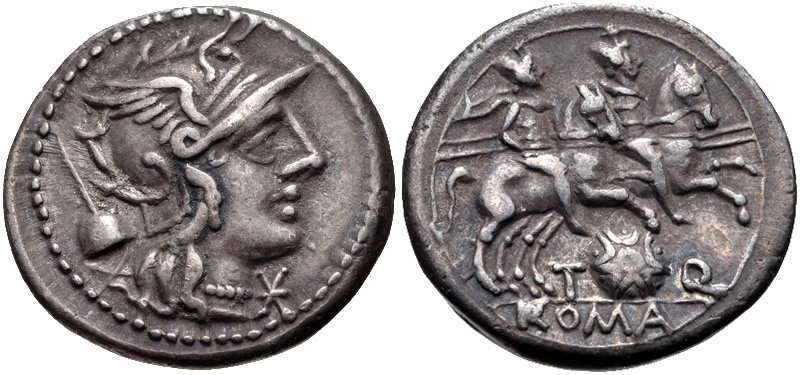
Denarius of Titus Quinctius Flamininus, 126 BC. On the obverse is the head of Roma, with the apex of the Flamen Dialis behind, alluding to his cognomen. The reverse shows the Dioscuri riding right, with a Macedonian shield below, which is a reference to the Battle of Cynoscephalae won by his great-grandfather in 197 BC.

The gens Quinctia, sometimes written Quintia, was a patrician family at ancient Rome. Throughout the history of the Republic, its members often held the highest offices of the state, and it produced some men of importance even during the imperial period. For the first forty years after the expulsion of the kings the Quinctii are not mentioned, and the first of the gens who obtained the consulship was Titus Quinctius Capitolinus Barbatus in 471 BC; but from that year their name constantly appears in the Fasti consulares.

As with other patrician families, in later times there were also plebeian Quinctii. Some of these may have been the descendants of freedmen of the gens, or of patrician Quinctii who had voluntarily gone over to the plebs. There may also have been unrelated persons who happened to share the same nomen.

Pliny the Elder relates that it was the custom in the Quinctia gens for even the women not to wear any ornaments of gold.

== Origin ==
The Quinctia gens was one of the Alban houses removed to Rome by Tullus Hostilius, and enrolled by him among the patricians. It was consequently one of the minores gentes. The nomen Quinctius is a patronymic surname based on the praenomen Quintus. The spelling Quintius is common in later times, but Quinctius is the ancient and more correct form, which occurs on coins and in the Fasti Capitolini.

== Praenomina ==
The main praenomina used by the Quinctii were Lucius and Titus. The family also used the names Caeso, Gnaeus, and Quintus. All were very common throughout Roman history, except Caeso, which initially was principally borne among the patrician Fabii. Ernst Badian therefore suggests that the use of Caeso may reflect an old family connection between the Fabii and the Quinctii. Other praenomina were used by the plebeian Quinctii, such as Decimus, Titus, or Publius.

== Branches and cognomina ==
The three great patrician families of the Quinctia gens bore the cognomina Capitolinus, Cincinnatus, and Flamininus. Besides these we find Quinctii with the surnames Atta, Claudus, Crispinus, Hirpinus, Scapula, Trogus, and Valgus. A few members of the gens bore no cognomen. The only surname that occurs on coins is that of Crispinus Sulpicianus, which is found on coins struck in the time of Augustus. The cognomen Flamininus is also implied on a denarius.

The eldest branches of the gens, those that bore the surnames Capitolinus and Cincinnatus, may have sprung from two brothers, Titus Quinctius Capitolinus Barbatus, six times consul, and Lucius Quinctius Cincinnatus, twice dictator, two of the greatest men of their age. The Fasti show that both men were the son and grandson of Lucius, and the two were well acquainted with one another.

The cognomen Capitolinus is derived from the Mons Capitolinus, or Capitoline Hill, one of the famous seven hills of Rome. The agnomen Barbatus of this family means "bearded". The surname Cincinnatus refers to someone with fine, curly hair, as does the agnomen Crispinus, which belonged to the later Capitolini. A few of the Quinctii bear both the surnames Cincinnatus and Capitolinus, and men of both families also bore the cognomen Pennus (sometimes found as Poenus). According to Isidore, this surname had the meaning of "sharp": "pennum antiqui acutum dicebant." Alternately the name could be connected with penna, a feather, or wing.

Claudus appeared in the beginning of the third century, but was rapidly replaced by Flamininus, which derived from flamen, and also gave rise to the gens Flaminia. This cognomen was likely adopted by the descendants of Lucius Quinctius, who was Flamen Dialis during the third quarter of the third century BC. The family remained prominent over the next century; their most famous member was Titus Quinctius Flamininus, who defeated Philip V of Macedon in 197 BC.

== Members ==
This list includes abbreviated praenomina. For an explanation of this practice, see filiation.

=== Quinctii Capitolini et Crispini ===
- Titus Quinctius L. f. L. n. Capitolinus Barbatus, consul in 471, 468, 465, 446, 443, and 439 BC.
- Titus Quinctius T. f. L. n. Capitolinus Barbatus, consul in 421 BC.
- Titus Quinctius T. f. T. n. Capitolinus Barbatus, consular tribune in 405 BC.
- Titus Quinctius (T. f. L. n. Cincinnatus) Capitolinus, tribunus militum consulari potestate in 385 BC, and magister equitum in the same year to the dictator Aulus Cornelius Cossus.
- Gnaeus Quinctius Capitolinus, one of the first two Curule aediles elected in 366 BC.
- Titus Quinctius T. f. Pennus Capitolinus Crispinus, dictator in 361 BC, and consul in 354 and 351.
- Gnaeus Quinctius T. f. T. n. Capitolinus, dictator clavi figendi causa in 331 BC.
- Titus Quinctius L. f. L. n. Crispinus, praetor in 209 BC, then consul in 208 with Marcus Claudius Marcellus, during the Second Punic War; wounded near Tarentum, and died at the close of the year.
- Lucius Quinctius Crispinus, praetor in 186 BC, was assigned Hither Spain as his province.
- Titus Quinctius T. f. Crispinus Sulpicianus, consul in 9 BC.
- Titus Quinctius T. f. T. n. Crispinus Valerianus, consul suffectus in AD 2, and a member of the Arval Brethren from at least AD 14 to after 21.

=== Quinctii Cincinnati ===
- Lucius Quinctius L. f. L. n. Cincinnatus, consul in 460 BC, and dictator in 458 and 439.
- Caeso Quinctius L. f. L. n. Cincinnatus, son of the dictator, died in exile.
- Lucius Quinctius L. f. L. n. Cincinnatus, consular tribune in 438, 425, and 420 BC, and magister equitum in 437.
- Titus Quinctius L. f. L. n. Cincinnatus Pennus, consul in 431 and 428 BC, and consular tribune in 426.
- Quintus Quinctius L. f. L. n. Cincinnatus, consular tribune in 415 and 405 BC.
- Titus Quinctius T. f. L. n. Cincinnatus Capitolinus, consular tribune in 388 and 384 BC, and dictator in 380.
- Lucius Quinctius (L. f. L. n.) Cincinnatus, consular tribune in 386, 385, and 377 BC.
- Gaius Quinctius Cincinnatus, consular tribune in 377 BC.
- Quintus Quinctius Cincinnatus, consular tribune in 369 BC.
- Titus Quinctius Pennus Cincinnatus Capitolinus, consular tribune in 368 BC, and magister equitum in 367.

=== Quinctii Claudi et Flaminini ===
- Lucius Quinctius Cn. f. T. n. (Claudus), a military tribune in 326 BC under Quintus Publilius Philo. He was probably the son of Gnaeus Quinctius Capitolinus, dictator in 331, and the father of Caeso Quinctius Claudus, consul in 271.
- Caeso Quinctius L. f. Cn. n. Claudus, consul in 271 BC.
- Lucius Quinctius K. f. L. n. (Claudus), Flamen Dialis during the third quarter of the third century BC. He was probably a son of Caeso Quinctius Claudus, consul in 271.
- Titus Quinctius L. f. K. n. Flamininus, son of Lucius Quinctius, the Flamen Dialis, and father of Titus and Lucius Quinctius Flamininus, the consuls of 198 and 192 BC.
- Caeso Quinctius L. f. K. n. Flamininus, one of the duumviri ordered to contract for the building of the temple of Concordia, in 217 BC.
- Quinctius L. f. K. n. Claudus Flamininus, (Note: His name is found under a completely corrupted form in the manuscripts of Livy, as "Quintus Claudius Flamen". Badian has shown that since his praenomen was not recorded, later historians amended his name to fit into a plausible tria nomina.) praetor in 208 BC, sent to Tarentum, where he stayed as propraetor until 205. He was either the third son of Lucius Quinctius, the Flamen Dialis, or the same man as Caeso Quinctius Flamininus, the duumvir of 217.
- Titus Quinctius T. f. L. n. Flamininus, consul in 198 BC, and censor in 189; defeated Philip V of Macedon at the Battle of Cynoscephalae.
- Lucius Quinctius T. f. L. n. Flamininus, a general under his elder brother, Titus, during the war against Philip, and consul in 192 BC. He was created augur in 212 BC.
- Caeso Quinctius K. f. L. f. Flamininus, (Note: His praenomen is often found as Gaius, but Badian has shown that it is a corruption in the manuscript of Livy.) praetor peregrinus in 177 BC. He was the likely son of Caeso Quinctius Flamininus, the duumvir of 217.
- Titus Quinctius T. f. Flamininus, ambassador to Cotys, the King of Thrace, in 167 BC; elected augur the same year.
- Titus Quinctius T. f. T. n. Flamininus, consul in 150 BC.
- Titus Quinctius T. f. T. n. Flamininus, consul in 123 BC.
- Titus Quinctius T. f. T. n. Flamininus, triumvir monetalis in 126 BC. He was probably the son of the consul of 123.

=== Others ===
- Decimus Quinctius, a man of obscure birth, but great military reputation, commanded the Roman fleet at Tarentum in 210 BC, during the Second Punic War, and was slain in a naval engagement that year.
- Titus Quinctius Trogus, accused by the quaestor Marcus Sergius.
- Titus Quinctius Atta, a Roman comic poet, who died in 78 BC.
- Publius Quinctius, defended by Cicero in his first major oration, Pro Quinctio, in 81 BC.
- Lucius Quinctius, praetor in 67 BC, an opponent of the constitution of Sulla, and a rival of Lucius Licinius Lucullus.
- Titus Quinctius Scapula, a partisan of Gnaeus Pompeius during the Civil War.
- Quinctius Hirpinus, a friend of the poet Horace.
- Gaius Quinctius Atticus, consul suffectus in November and December in AD 69.
- Publius Quinctius Scapula, mentioned by Pliny the Elder as an instance of sudden death.

== See also ==
- List of Roman gentes

== Bibliography ==
=== Ancient sources ===
- Marcus Tullius Cicero, Cato Maior de Senectute, Epistulae ad Atticum, Pro Quinctio.
- Diodorus Siculus, Bibliotheca Historica (Library of History).
- Marcus Terentius Varro, De Lingua Latina (On the Latin Language).
- Quintus Horatius Flaccus (Horace), Carmen Saeculare, Epistulae.
- Titus Livius (Livy), History of Rome.
- Valerius Maximus, Factorum ac Dictorum Memorabilium (Memorable Facts and Sayings).
- Gaius Plinius Secundus (Pliny the Elder), Historia Naturalis (Natural History).
- Flavius Magnus Aurelius Cassiodorus Senator, Chronica.
- Isidorus Hispalensis, Origines.
- Joannes Zonaras, Epitome Historiarum (Epitome of History).

=== Modern sources ===
- Badian, E. (1971). "The Family and Early Career of T. Quinctius Flamininus". The Journal of Roman Studies. 61: 102–111. doi:10.2307/300009. ISSN 0075-4358. JSTOR 300009.
- Broughton, Thomas Robert Shannon (1952). The magistrates of the Roman republic. Vol. 2. New York: American Philological Association.
- Chase, George Davis (1897). "The Origin of Roman Praenomina". Harvard Studies in Classical Philology. 8: 103–184. doi:10.2307/310491. ISSN 0073-0688. JSTOR 310491.
- Michael Crawford, Roman Republican Coinage, Cambridge University Press (1974, 2001).
- Joseph Hilarius Eckhel, Doctrina Numorum Veterum (The Study of Ancient Coins, 1792–1798).
- Barthold Georg Niebuhr, The History of Rome, Julius Charles Hare and Connop Thirlwall, trans., John Smith, Cambridge (1828).
- Martha W. Hoffman Lewis, The Official Priests of Rome under the Julio-Claudians, American Academy, Rome (1955).
- Friedrich Münzer, Roman Aristocratic Parties and Families, translated by Thérèse Ridley, Johns Hopkins University Press, 1999 (originally published in 1920).
- Jörg Rüpke, Anne Glock, David Richardson (translator), Fasti Sacerdotum: A Prosopography of Pagan, Jewish, and Christian Religious Officials in the City of Rome, 300 BC to AD 499, Oxford University Press, 2008.
- D. P. Simpson, Cassell's Latin and English Dictionary, Macmillan Publishing Company, New York (1963).
- William Smith, ed., Dictionary of Greek and Roman Biography and Mythology, Little, Brown and Company, Boston (1849).
- Syme, Ronald (1986). The Augustan aristocracy. Oxford: Clarendon press. ISBN 978-0-19-814859-3.
