= Gnaeus Genucius Augurinus =

Gnaeus Genucius Augurinus (died 396 BC) came from the ancient plebeian gens Genucia and was a high magistrate of the early Roman Republic.

According to the Fasti Capitolini, Genucius' father and grandfather bore the praenomen Marcus.

Genucius was consular tribune for the first time in 399 BC,. In 396 BC, he held the consular tribunate for the second time. Together with his colleague Lucius Titinius Pansa Saccus, he is said to have gone to war as commander-in-chief of a Roman army against the Falisci and Capenates. Due to their rashness, the two high military leaders were ambushed, and in the ensuing battle Genucius, who was fighting in the front ranks, was killed. Titinius gathered his forces on a hill, but did not dare to climb back down to the plain and renew the battle. It is possible that the depiction of Genucius' death is a duplicate of the death of Lucius Genucius Aventinensis, who died in 362 BC. He is said to have fallen as a consul in the fight against the Hernici. Genucius could be identical to the homonym mistakenly referred to as tribune by Gaius Gracchus in a speech to the people.
