= Titus Quinctius Poenus Cincinnatus =

5th century BC Roman politician and soldier

Personal details
- Born: Unknown Ancient Rome
- Died: Unknown Ancient Rome
- Children: Titus Quinctius Cincinnatus Capitolinus
- Parent: Lucius Quinctius Cincinnatus

Titus Quinctius Poenus (or Pennus) Cincinnatus was a consul of the Roman Republic in 431 and 428 BC and a consular tribune in 426 BC. He might have been consular tribune again in 420 BC.

Quinctius belonged to the powerful Quinctia gens and was the son of one of the early republic's most famous figures, the twice appointed dictator Lucius Quinctius Cincinnatus. He was probably the younger brother of Lucius Quinctius Cincinnatus, consular tribune in 431 BC. Filiations indicate that he is the father of Titus Quinctius Cincinnatus Capitolinus, consular tribune in 388 BC.

== Career ==
Quinctius was elected consul in 431 BC together with Gaius Julius Mento. Escalations of Rome's war with the Aequi and Volsci led to the appointment of a dictator, Aulus Postumius Tubertus, who successfully defeated their combined forces at Mount Algidus. Quinctius held the command of one of the legions under the dictator, while his colleague Julius remained in the city.

Quinctius was elected consul for a second time in 428 BC. Ancient accounts of the consulship focus mostly on his colleague Aulus Cornelius Cossus, winner of the spoila opima and a triumph. Plutarch and Festus say that Cossus achieved these honors while he was consul, while most other ancient authors, such as Livy, place the event in 437 BC. According to Livy, the chief political event of 428 BC was the appointment of a special commission to investigate the participation of Fidenae in the Veientane raids on Roman territory. The commission consisted of Lucius Sergius Fidenas, Quintus Servilius Priscus Structus Fidenas and Mamercus Aemilius Mamercinus.

Cossus and Quinctius were elected as consular tribunes in 426 BC, together with Gaius Furius Pacilus Fusus and Marcus Postumius Albinus Regillensis. The year saw the continuation of the war with Veii and Fidenae and the appointment of a dictator, Mamercus Aemilius Mamercinus. During the dictatorship Quinctius was a legatus and led troops against Veii. The war was successful for the Romans and Fidenae was recaptured, earning a triumph for Aemilius.

Quinctius, or his brother Lucius, was elected as consular tribune in 420 BC. Livy and the Chronograph of 354 have Lucius Quinctius, while the Fasti Capitolini points towards Titus Quinctius. Scholars generally favor Lucius Quinctius as the consular tribune of 420 BC, and say that the Fasti has confused the two brothers. The college, including Quinctius, consisted of Lucius Furius Medullinus, Aulus Sempronius Atratinus and Marcus Manlius Vulso. Little is known of the events during the year other than that Sempronius presided over the election of the Quaestors.

== See also ==
- Quinctia gens – Ancient Roman family

Political offices
| Preceded by Lucius Pinarius Mamercinus; Lucius Furius Medullinus; Spurius Postumius Albus Regillensis as Consular Tribunes | Consul of the Roman Republic with Gaius Julius Mento; 431 BC | Succeeded by Lucius Papirius Crassus; Lucius Julius Iullus as Consuls |
| Preceded by Hostus Lucretius Tricipitinus; Lucius Sergius Fidenas | Consul of the Roman Republic with Aulus Cornelius Cossus; 428 BC | Succeeded by Gaius Servilius Structus Ahala; Lucius Papirius Mugillanus |
| Preceded by Gaius Servilius Structus Ahala; Lucius Papirius Mugillanus as Consuls | Military Tribunes with Consular power with Gaius Furius Pacilus Fusus; Marcus Postumius Albinus Regillensis and Aulus Cornelius Cossus; 426 BC | Succeeded by Aulus Sempronius Atratinus; Lucius Quinctius Cincinnatus; Lucius Furius Medullinus; Lucius Horatius Barbatus |
| Preceded by Numerius Fabius Vibulanus; Titus Quinctius Capitolinus Barbatus as Consuls | Military Tribunes with Consular power with Aulus Sempronius Atratinus, Lucius Furius Medullinus and Marcus Manlius Vulso; 420 BC | Succeeded by Agrippa Menenius Lanatus; Publius Lucretius Tricipitinus; Spurius Nautius Rutilus; Gaius Servilius Axilla |
