= Titus Quinctius Capitolinus Barbatus (consul 421 BC) =

5th-century BC Roman Republican consul

Titus Quinctius Capitolinus Barbatus was a consul of the Roman Republic in 421 BC.

Quinctius belonged to the Quinctia gens, one of the early Republics most influential patrician families. Quinctius was the son of Titus Quinctius Capitolinus Barbatus, a six time consul, and nephew of the famous dictator Lucius Quinctius Cincinnatus.

== Consulship ==
In 421 BC Quinctius was elected as consul together with Numerius Fabius Vibulanus. The year saw war against the Aequi and great military success for Quinctius's colleague Fabius, who celebrated an ovatio (minor triumph) for his victories. The year also saw the consuls overseeing the institution of a new law increasing the number of Quaestors from two to four.

== Consular tribune ==
In 405 BC, sixteen years after his consulship, Quinctius was elected as one of the Consular tribunes as the most senior member of the consular college. His colleagues was Quintus Quinctius Cincinnatus, cousin once removed to Quinctius, Gaius Julius Iulus, Aulus Manlius Vulso Capitolinus, Lucius Furius Medullinus and Manius Aemilius Mamercinus. The consulars continued the war started with Veii in 406, succeeding with surrounding the city and beginning the Siege of Veii which would last for ten years.

== Two Individuals? ==
It is unclear if the consul of 421 and the consular tribune of 405 BC should be considered as the same individual or as father and son. Broughton in Magistrates of the Roman Republic treats both posts as being held by the same individual while the large encyclopedia Dictionary of Greek and Roman Biography and Mythology treat them as two different individuals with the father holding the consulship and his son being the consular tribune. An objection towards treating the consul and the consular tribune as the same individual lies in the chronology, if the consul was born by the time of his fathers first consulship in 471 BC he would be close to fifty by the time of his consulship in 421 and approaching his seventies by the time of his role as consular tribune.

Suolahti, in his research on the Roman Censors, treats the consul and the consular tribune as the same individual in his speculation in regards to the missing censors of the lumstrum XV. Where the main argument for the inclusion of Quinctius as a viable candidate for having held the censorship lies with him being a repeated consular and politically active in the period 417 to 404 BC in which the lustrum XV was held. Suolahti, drawing from the fact that the census described in 403 is numbered lustrum XVI and counting from lustrum X which was held in 459 BC only gives us four pairs of censors (in 443, 435, 430 and 418 BC), thus a missing lustrum XV. Additionally drawing upon a gap in the Fasti Capitolini from 414 to 410 BC the censorship can likely be placed within this time frame, with Suolahti leaning towards the year 410 BC. Suolahti's main suggestions for these unknown censors are Spurius Nautius Rutilus and Manius Aemilius Mamercinus but adds Quinctius, among a few others, as one of the viable options. While Suolahti argues for the existence of these unknown censors and lustrum XV, these possible candidates should be noted, and is noted by the author himself, are simply educated guesses based on the suitability of the candidates to the office and are in the authors words "mere suppositions". Considering the already existing doubt in regards to the identity of Quinctius second imperium, his potential for being censor should be equally doubted.

== See also ==
- Quinctia gens – Ancient Roman family

Political offices
| Preceded by Lucius Manlius Capitolinus; Lucius Papirius Mugillanus; Quintus Antonius Merenda | Consul of the Roman Republic with Numerius Fabius Vibulanus; 421 BC | Succeeded by Titus Quinctius Poenus Cincinnatus or Lucius Quinctius Cincinnatus; Lucius Furius Medullinus; Marcus Manlius Vulso; Aulus Sempronius Atratinus |
| Preceded by Publius Cornelius Rutilus Cossus; Gnaeus Cornelius Cossus; Numerius Fabius Ambustus; Lucius Valerius Potitus | Consular tribune of the Roman Republic with Quintus Quinctius Cincinnatus; Gaius Julius Iulus; Aulus Manlius Vulso Capitolinus; Lucius Furius Medullinus; Manius Aemilius Mamercinus; 405 BC | Succeeded by Gaius Valerius Potitus Volusus; Manius Sergius Fidenas; Publius Cornelius Maluginensis; Gnaeus Cornelius Cossus; Caeso Fabius Ambustus; Spurius Nautius Rutilus |
