= Aulus Cornelius Cossus =

5th-century BC Roman general

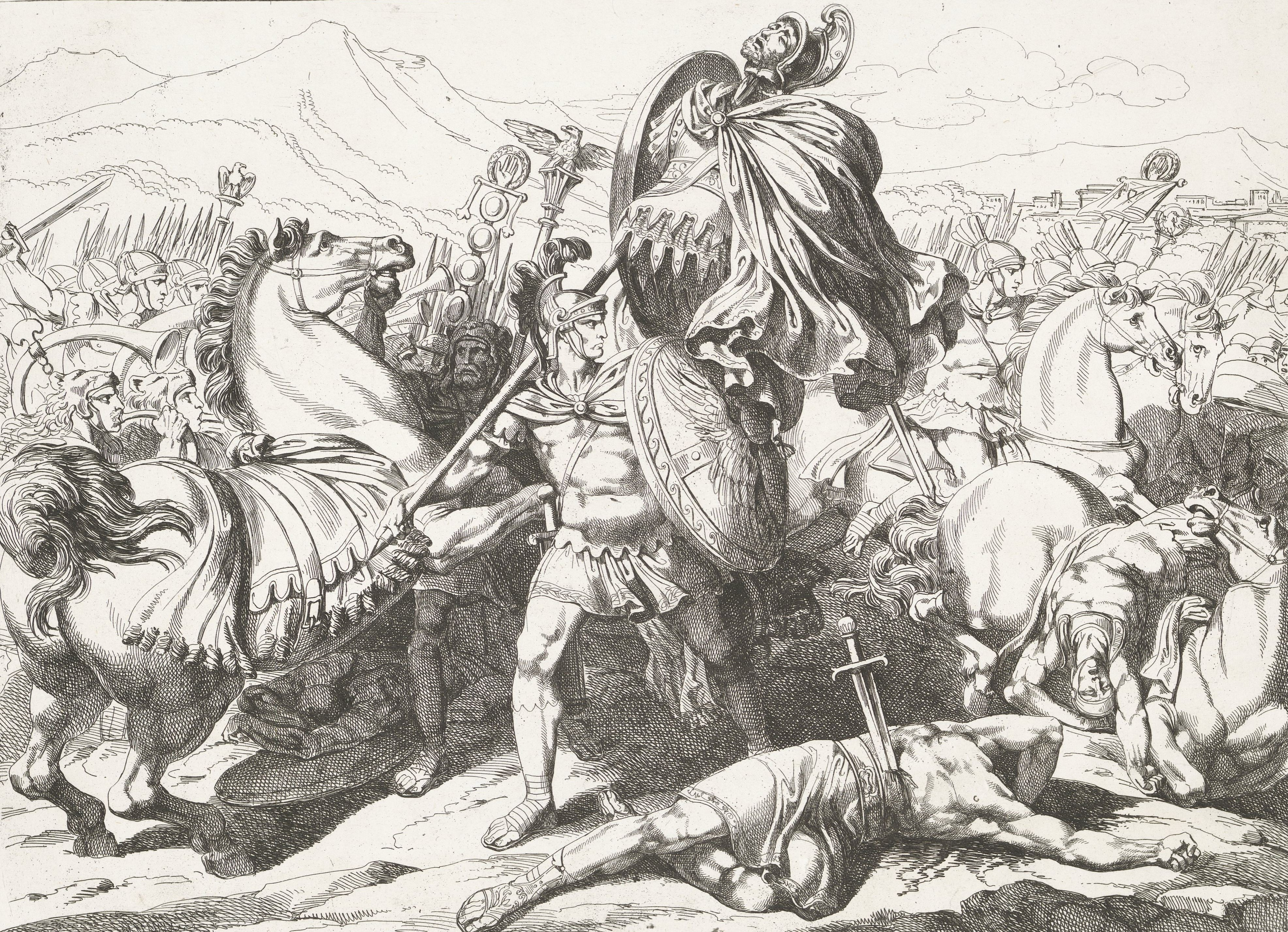
Aulus Cornelius Cossus carries the head of the Etruscan king Lars Tolumnius during the Battle of Fidenae

Aulus Cornelius Cossus was a Roman general in the early Republic. He is famous for being the second Roman, after Romulus, to be awarded the spolia opima, Rome's highest military honour, for killing the commander of an enemy army in single combat. Only three Romans ever achieved this feat, but a fourth winner was officially denied the honour by a jealous Consul Caesar Octavianus (later Augustus) who insisted the honour was limited exclusively to Roman commanders. Cornelius Cossus proved otherwise.

The achievement happened at the Battle of Fidenae in 437 BC when Rome faced the forces of Fidenae (a Roman colony in revolt) allied with both the Falerii and Veii, among Rome's most long-standing and powerful enemies. The Romans fought under the command of Dictator Mamercus Aemilius Mamercinus; the enemy fought under the command of King Lars Tolumnius of Veii.

According to Livy's account, the "remarkably handsome" cavalry officer Cornelius Cossus identified the king during battle and promptly charged him, unhorsing him with his spear. Cornelius Cossus nimbly used the spear to vault off his own horse, and as Lars Tolumnius attempted to get back on his feet, Cornelius Cossus smashed him back to the ground with the boss of his shield. As the king sprawled on the ground, Cornelius Cossus speared him several times, killing him. He then decapitated the king, spiked his head on his spear and paraded it before his now-leaderless enemy army, which panicked and fled.

The Senate agreed to award dictator Mamercus Aemilius Mamercinus a triumph for the victory, but Aulus Cornelius Cossus, winner of the spolia optima, became the triumph's central focus. Following Romulus' example, Cornelius Cossus solemnly placed his spolia optima secunda (a display of the king's sword, shield, and armour) near Romulus' spolia optima prima inside the Temple of Jupiter Feretrius on the Capitoline Hill.

Cossus was elected consul in 428 BC, a year mostly known for a horrible drought and plague. A prolonged absence of rain caused streams and lakes to dry up, and even the Tiber barely flowed. Many cattle died of thirst, and their corpses created unsanitary conditions in which both humans and the surviving cattle were ravaged by disease. Religious charlatans took advantage of the general misery; concerned by an influx of foreign superstitions, the government ordered the aediles to ensure that only Roman gods were worshipped, and that the worship was conducted in the prescribed and traditional manner.

In 426 BC Cornelius Cossus was elected one of four consular tribunes (tribunus militum consulari potestate) a wartime senior magistracy, abolished in 367 BC by the Lex Licinia Sextia. Cossus was to hold Rome while the other three consular tribunes (Gaius Furius Pacilus Fusus, Marcus Postumius and Titus Quinctius Pennus Cincinnatus) led the Roman army to attack Veii. The trio of commanders lost the ensuing battle, mainly through their own unwillingness to work together.

The people were in a state of panic and demanded a dictator to avenge the defeat. So Consular Tribune Cornelius Cossus nominated his commander Mamercus Aemilius Mamercinus from the Battle of Fidenae. Since his triumph, Mamercinus had his citizenship degraded by the censors in retribution for reducing their terms. The Senate agreed with the nomination and appointed Mamercinus dictator. He, in turn, appointed Cornelius Cossus his second-in-command, i.e., magister equitum (master of the horse).

The dictator recalled the army home from Veii and ordered them to set up a fortified position outside the Colline gate. A garrison was placed on the city walls, the city was shut down, and Mamercinus called for a public assembly. He gave a speech framing the prior defeat as nothing more than an insignificant reversal of fortune and reproached everyone for getting carried away with their emotions. He explained that the loss was not because of any deficiency of the Roman army, or any great accomplishment by the enemy but a mere failure of leadership, and reminded Rome that they had beaten the Veientines already six times; they had captured Fidenae as often as it had been attacked. He reminded them that he had already defeated a combined force of Veii, Fidenae, and Faliscans and his lieutenant was Cornelius Cossus, hero of Rome, the man who had been awarded the spolia opima. He concluded by enumerating the crimes and outrages of the enemy and promised that when he attacked the enemy he would guarantee the Roman people a far better outcome than the censors who had attacked him.

On the following day, the Romans marched to within a mile of Fidenae and the battle was joined. Things were going well for the Romans until a huge army flooded out of the city gates and drove into the Roman army. The Romans panicked, but Aemilius Mamercinus regained control and then ordered the Roman cavalry to attack. Cornelius Cossus had already ordered his cavalry to remove the bits from their horses, and between the dust they kicked up and the smoke, the horses could not see the fire, much less be afraid of it. The Romans took the enemy camp, then the city and looted them both. Aemilius Mamercinus and Cornelius Cossus were able to return to Rome at the head of victorious Roman army.

Livy notes that a Cornelius Cossus was elected consul in 413 BC, but doesn't identify him as being the man who was awarded the spolia optima; this person may have been Cornelius Cossus' son. Diodorus Siculus and Cassiodorus say it was not Aulus Cornelius Cossus, but rather his son Marcus Cornelius Cossus. This year is missing from the Fasti Capitolini list of Rome's highest magistrates.

== Sources ==
- T. R. S. Broughton, The Magistrates of the Roman Republic. Vol. 1: 509 B.C. – 100 B.C., Case Western Reserve University Press, Cleveland/Ohio, 1951.
- Anthony Everitt, The Rise of Rome. The making of the Worlds's Greatest Empire, 2012. ISBN 978 90 263 2618 9
- L. Richardson, jr, A New Topographical Dictionary of Ancient Rome, Baltimore - London, 1992. p. 219 ISBN 0801843006
- Livy - Ad Urbe Condita

Political offices
Preceded by Lucius Sergius Fidenas II; Hostus Lucretius Tricipitinus	Roman consul 428 BC with Titus Quinctius Poenus Cincinnatus II	Succeeded by Gaius Servilius Axilla; Lucius Papirius Mugillanus
Preceded by Gaius Servilius Axilla; Lucius Papirius Mugillanus as consuls	Roman consular tribune 426 BC with Titus Quinctius, Gaius Furius, Marcus Postumius	Succeeded by Aulus Sempronius; Lucius Quinctius II; Lucius Furius II; Lucius Horatius
