= Gaius Furius Pacilus (consul 412 BC) =

Consul of the Roman Republic in 412 BC

Gaius Furius Pacilus was a consul of the Roman Republic in 412 BC.

Furius belonged to the Furia gens, a patrician family which was at its height of its power at this time in the Republic. Furius' father was Gaius Furius Pacilus Fusus, consul in 441 BC. Furius had no known children, but the later Gaius Furius Pacilus, consul in 251 BC, is most likely a descendant. The Pacili relationship to the other Furii is unknown, but there is a possibility, considering his father's cognomen, that the Furii Fusi belong to the same branch.

== Career ==
Furius was elected as one of the consuls in 412 BC, sharing the office with Quintus Fabius Vibulanus Ambustus. Both consuls held the imperium for the first time in that year. Little of note has been recorded during the year they were consuls (with the exception of an agrarian law being proposed by one of the plebeian tribunes) and both consuls do not appear in subsequent records following their consulship.

== See also ==
- Furia gens – Ancient Roman family

Political offices
Preceded by Aulus Cornelius Cossus; Lucius Furius Medullinus	Roman Consul with Quintus Fabius Vibulanus Ambustus; 412 BC	Succeeded by Marcus Papirius Atratinus or Marcus Papirius Mugillanus; Spurius Nautius Rutilus
