= Marcus Foslius Flaccinator =

5th-century BC Roman statesman

Marcus Foslius Flaccinator was a Roman statesman who served as a member of the tribuni militum consulari potestate in 433 BC alongside Marcus Fabius Vibulanus and Lucius Sergius Fidenas. He later served as Pontifex Maximus.
