= Lucius Papirius Mugillanus (consul 427 BC) =

Roman senator and consul in 427 BC

Lucius Papirius Mugillanus was a consul of the Roman Republic in 427 BC, consular tribune in 422 BC and censor in 418 BC.

Papirius belonged to the patrician Papiria gens. He was the son of Lucius Papirius Mugillanus, consul suffect in 444 and censor in 443 BC. Marcus Papirius Mugillanus, consul in 418 BC, would have been a younger brother or son of Papirius, while later Papirii Mugillani, such as Lucius Papirius Mugillanus, consular tribune in 382 BC, should probably be considered grandchildren or grand-nephews.

== Career ==
In 427 BC Papirius held the consulship together with Gaius Servilius Structus Ahala. Nothing is known of the events during their consulship.

Five years later, in 422 BC, Papirius would again reach the imperium, this time as a consular tribune together with Lucius Manlius Capitolinus and Quintus Antonius Merenda. There is little recorded of the actions of the consular college, but the year saw a large trial being held against the former consul Gaius Sempronius Atratinus. Sempronius had the previous year held command against the Volscians and was being prosecuted for needlessly endangering his legion. The prosecution was led by the Tribunes of the Plebs, of which Lucius Hortensius was the main prosecutor. Sempronius had succeeded with getting four of his former officers elected as Tribunes of the Plebs to oppose Hortensius. The tactic only partially worked and simply delayed his conviction, which came in 420 BC in the form of heavy fines.

In the same year as the conviction fell for Sempronius, 420 BC, Papirius was appointed as Interrex to hold the comitia. In this role he most likely oversaw the change from consuls in the previous year to a return to the use of consular tribunes.

Papirius was elected as one of two censors in 418 BC. His colleague in the office is not known. This was the first year of consular office for his son or brother Marcus Papirius Mugillanus and the second term as consular tribune for his former consular colleague Servilius. The actions of the censors are not recorded as ancient chroniclers instead focused on the events relating to the war with the Aequi and Labici.

== Conflicting Traditions ==
The Papirius who held the consulship in 427 BC can not be certified to be a different individual from that of Lucius Papirius Mugillanus, suffect consul in 444 BC, nor can the consular tribune of 422 BC with certainty be identified as the same person as the consul of 427 BC. The classicist scholar Münzer notes uncertainty with the identification while the later scholar Degrassi points towards the lack of iteration in the ancient records indicates them as being two different individuals (one consul in 444 BC and a son of this consul in 427 BC). Broughton follows Degrassi and adds that "it is reasonable to suppose that the consul of 427 and the military tribune of 422 were the same person".

== See also ==
- Papiria gens

Political offices
Preceded by Aulus Cornelius Cossus; Titus Quinctius Poenus Cincinnatus	Roman consul 427 BC; With: Gaius Servilius Axilla	Succeeded by consular tribunes
Preceded by Gaius Sempronius Atratinus; Quintus Fabius Vibulanus as consuls	Roman consular tribune 422 BC; With: Lucius Manlius Capitolinus; Quintus Antonius Merenda	Succeeded by Titus Quinctius Capitolinus Barbatus; Numerius Fabius Vibulanus as consuls
