= Veturia gens =

Ancient Roman family

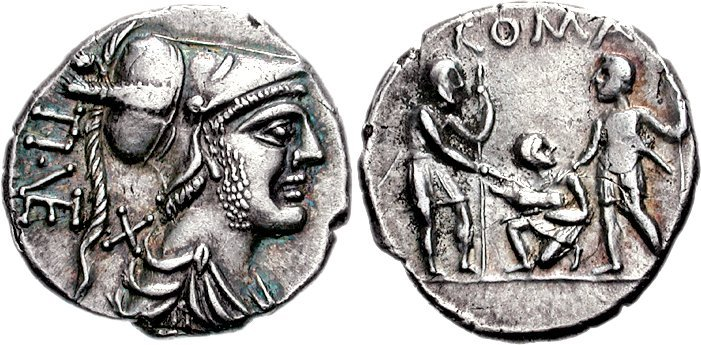
Denarius of Tiberius Veturius, 137 BC. On the obverse is the head of Mars, a possible allusion to Tiberus Veturius Philo, the flamen martialis. The reverse depicts an oath: a Samnite (left) and Roman (right) touch with their swords a pig held by a kneeling man, who is about to sacrifice the animal in order to sanctify the oath.

The gens Veturia, originally Vetusia, was an ancient patrician family of the Roman Republic. According to tradition, the armourer Mamurius Veturius lived in the time of Numa Pompilius, and made the sacred ancilia. The Veturii occur regularly in the Fasti Consulares of the early Republic, with Gaius Veturius Geminus Cicurinus holding the consulship in 499 BC. Like other old patrician gentes, the Veturii also developed plebeian branches. The family declined in the later Republic, with the last consular Veturius holding office in 206 BC, during the Second Punic War.

== Origin ==
The nomen Veturius belongs to a class of gentilicia in which the old, medial 's' has been replaced by 'r', as in Valesius, Fusius, Papisius, and Numesius, which in later times were Valerius, Furius, Papirius, and Numerius. Some scholars suppose, both from the fact that Mamurius Veturius had two gentile names, and from his connection with Numa, that the Veturii were of Sabine origin; but Chase classifies the name with those that were either of Latin origin, or which cannot be shown to have originated elsewhere; he derives the name from vetus, "old".

Veturia was one of the 35 tribes of Rome, principally named after ancient patrician families, but it was originally spelled Voturia, perhaps an initial variant of the name. Lily Ross Taylor mentions that the gens were from the region of Ostia, on the left bank of the Tiber, as there was a shrine of the Veturii there.

== Praenomina ==
The main praenomina of the Veturii were Gaius, Titus, Spurius, and Lucius, but there are also examples of Publius, Tiberius, Marcus, and Postumus. Publius seems to have been one of the earliest names of this gens, but it does not appear in later generations, while Tiberius and Marcus appear in one family of the Veturii Crassi. Lucius, which seems to have been the dominant praenomen of the later Veturii, first appears in the second century of the Republic. Postumus was an uncommon praenomen, presumably because its original meaning, "hindmost, last", referring to a youngest child, was easily confused with the similar sounding post humus, "after burial", with the implication that the child's father was dead.

== Branches and cognomina ==
The main family of the Veturii bore the cognomen Cicurinus, which the antiquarian Varro derived from cicur, quiet or patient. The Veturii who occur in the fasti from the outset of the Republic to the middle of the fifth century BC bore the additional surname of Geminus, a twin. From the time of the Decemvirs, this surname was replaced by Crassus, thick, sometimes with the implication of "dull" or "stupid". The Veturii Cicurini flourished down to the middle of the fourth century BC. Calvinus, bald or balding, occurs in the latter part of the fourth century BC, after which the Veturii fell into obscurity until the Second Punic War, when the surname Philo, one of the earliest cognomina borrowed from Greek, briefly appears. After this, the Veturii vanish from the consular fasti. The last Veturii appearing in history came from the Sempronii Gracchi, whose cognomen they adopted; they were thus plebeian.

Coins of this gens bear no cognomen. One curious example, issued by Tiberius Veturius Gracchus, depicts the head of a helmeted man on the obverse, and on the reverse, two men with staves and swords, on either side of a kneeling man holding a pig. The coin seems to commemorate a treaty, but the precise occasion is unknown. Michael Crawford suggests that the coin depicts an oath, adding that it might be a reference to the treaty made by Titus Veturius Calvinus with the Samnites at the Caudine Forks, as an example of Roman integrity. He also links the scene depicted to the treaty of 137 negotiated by Tiberius Sempronius Gracchus, the moneyer's cousin, during the Numantine War, although this view is disputed.

== Members ==
This list includes abbreviated praenomina. For an explanation of this practice, see filiation.

- Mamurius Veturius, or Veturius Mamurius, made the sacred ancilia in the reign of Numa Pompilius, the second King of Rome.
- Veturia, the mother of Gaius Marcius Coriolanus.

=== Veturii Gemini Cicurini ===
- Publius Veturius Cicurnus, quaestor in 509 BC, possibly the same as the consul of 499 BC
- Gaius Veturius Geminus Cicurinus, consul in 499 BC, possibly quaestor in 509 BC as well
- Titus Veturius Geminus Cicurinus, consul in 494 BC, proceeded against the Aequi, who retreated into the mountains at his approach.
- Titus Veturius T. f. Geminus Cicurinus, consul in 462 BC, defeated the Volsci, and received an ovation.
- Gaius Veturius P. f. Geminus Cicurinus, consul in 455 BC, defeated the Aequi.

=== Veturii Crassi Cicurini ===
- Spurius Veturius P. f. (Crassus) Cicurinus, father of the decemvir.
- Spurius Veturius Sp. f. P. n. Crassus Cicurinus, one of the decemvirs appointed to codify the first ten tables of Roman law, in 451 BC.
- Spurius Veturius Sp. f. Sp. n. Crassus Cicurinus, consular tribune in 417 BC.
- Tiberius Veturius Sp. f. Crassus Cicurinus, father of the consular tribune of 399 BC.
- Marcus Veturius Ti. f. Sp. n. Crassus Cicurinus, consular tribune in 399 BC, the only patrician elected this year; his five colleagues were all plebeians.
- Lucius Veturius Sp. f. Crassus Cicurinus, father of the consular tribune of 368 and 367 BC.
- Gaius Veturius (L. f. Sp. n.) Crassus Cicurinus, consular tribune in 377 and 369 BC.
- Lucius Veturius L. f. Sp. n. Crassus Cicurinus, consular tribune in 368 and 367 BC.

=== Veturii Philones ===
- Postumus Veturius Philo, grandfather of the consul of 220 BC.
- Lucius Veturius Post. f. Philo, father of the consul of 220 BC.
- Lucius Veturius L. f. Post. n. Philo, consul in 220 BC, dictator in 217 and censor in 210 BC.
- Lucius Veturius L. f. L. n. Philo, consul in 206 BC, and subsequently accompanied Scipio on his African campaign.
- Tiberus Veturius Philo, flamen martialis from 204 BC.
- Lucius Veturius Philo, quaestor circa 102 BC; his nomen is uncertain, and might be Publilius.

=== Veturii Gracchi ===
- Tiberius Veturius Gracchus Sempronianus, one of the Sempronii, who had been adopted into the gens Veturia, and was subsequently elected augur to fill the vacancy caused by the death of Tiberius Sempronius Gracchus in 174 BC.
- Tiberius Veturius T. f. Gracchus, triumvir monetalis in 137 BC.
- Tiberius Veturius T. f. T. n., mentioned in a consilium of Pompeius Strabo in 89 BC, likely the grandson of the moneyer.

=== Others ===
- Titus Veturius Calvinus, consul in 334 and 321 BC, during the Second Samnite War, defeated at the Caudine Forks.

== See also ==
- List of Roman gentes

== Bibliography ==
- Diodorus Siculus, Bibliotheca Historica (Library of History).
- Dionysius of Halicarnassus, Romaike Archaiologia (Roman Antiquities).
- Titus Livius (Livy), History of Rome.
- Quintus Asconius Pedianus, Commentarius in Oratio Ciceronis Pro Cornelio (Commentary on Cicero's Oration Pro Cornelio).
- Joseph Hilarius Eckhel, Doctrina Numorum Veterum (The Study of Ancient Coins, 1792–1798).
- Dictionary of Greek and Roman Biography and Mythology, William Smith, ed., Little, Brown and Company, Boston (1849).
- George Davis Chase, "The Origin of Roman Praenomina", in Harvard Studies in Classical Philology, vol. VIII (1897).
- T. Robert S. Broughton, The Magistrates of the Roman Republic, American Philological Association (1952–1986).
- Attilio Degrassi, Inscriptiones Latinae Liberae Rei Publicae (abbreviated ILLRP), Florence (1957–1963).
- Lily Ross Taylor, The Voting Districts of the Roman Republic, University of Michigan Press (1960).
- Michael Crawford, "Foedus and Sponsio", Papers of the British School at Rome, Vol. 41 (1973), pp. 1–7; Roman Republican Coinage, Cambridge University Press (1974, 2001).
- Clive Stannard, "Numismatic evidence for relations between Spain and Central Italy at the turn of the second and first centuries BC", in Schweizerische Numismatische Rundschau 84, 2005, pp. 47–80.
