= Numerius Fabius Vibulanus =

5th-century BC Roman senator and general

- Years active: fl. c. 421–407 BC
- Office: Consul (421 BC); Consular tribune (415, 407 BC)

Numerius (or Gnaeus) Fabius Vibulanus (fl. c. 421–407 BC) was a Roman senator and military commander. As consul in 421 BC, he campaigned successfully against the Aequi, for which he was awarded an ovation. During his term in office, Fabius and his colleague, Titus Quinctius, also carried a law which increased the number of quaestors from two to four.

Fabius was later a consular tribune in 415 and 407 BC. In 407 BC, Fabius and the other tribunes oversaw the loss of Verrugo to the Volscians.

== Censor? ==
Fabius could have been one of the unknown censors who completed the lustrum in between 417 and 404 BC as suggested by the classicist Jaakko Suolahti. Suolahti, drawing from the fact that the census described in 403 is numbered lustrum XVI and counting from lustrum X which was held in 459 BC only gives us four pairs of censors (in 443, 435, 430 and 418 BC), thus a missing lustrum XV. Additionally drawing upon a gap in the Fasti Capitolini from 414 to 410 BC the censorship can likely be placed within this timeframe, with Suolahti leaning towards the year 410 BC. Suolahti's main suggestions for these unknown censors are Spurius Nautius Rutilus and Manius Aemilius Mamercinus but adds Fabius as one of the viable options. While Suolahti argues for the existence of these unknown censors and lustrum XV, these possible candidates should be noted, and is noted by the author himself, are simply educated guesses based on the suitability of the candidates to the office and are in the authors words "mere suppositions".

== Name ==
The ancient sources exhibit confusion about Fabius's first name. The Fasti Capitolini, a list of Roman magistrates compiled during the time of Emperor Augustus, says Fabius's forename was Numerius, while the historian Livy calls him Gnaeus (or the corruption Marcus), and Diodorus Siculus has both Numerius (407 BC) and Gaius (415 BC). The Fabii are the only known patrician house to have used the rare name "Numerius", and there was a legend according to which the Fabii acquired the name as part of a marriage pact with a Samnite noble named Numerius Otacilius, in the fifth century BC. This story as a whole is unhistorical since there was no significant contact between Rome and Samnium during that period.

Münzer accepted the essence of the tale as correct, but redated the marriage alliance to the mid-third century BC in order to explain the two families' political successes during the period. By implication then, Fabius Vibulanus, the consul of 421 BC, was not called "Numerius", since, according to Münzer's theory, he predates the marriage alliance on which the name is contingent. Ogilvie thought "Gnaeus" more likely than "Numerius", thinking that Livy represented an older and more reliable tradition. Costa also preferred "Gnaeus", suggesting that its variant "Naeus" was confused with "Numerius" when the forenames were (as was common) abbreviated. Pinsent, on the other hand, rejected "Gnaeus", which he though is simply a corruption of text in Livy's manuscript, and accepted "Numerius", dismissing the story of the marriage alliance and its association with the name as later fabrications.

== Endnotes ==
Political offices
Preceded by Lucius Manlius; Lucius Papirius; Quintus Antonius as tribunes	Roman consul with Titus Quinctius; 421 BC	Succeeded by Quinctius Cincinnatus; Lucius Furius; Marcus Manlius; Aulus Sempronius as tribunes
Preceded by Aulus Sempronius; Marcus Papirius; Quintus Fabius; Spurius Nautius	Roman consular tribune with Publius Cornelius; Gaius Valerius; Quintus Quinctius; 415 BC	Succeeded by Gnaeus Cornelius; Lucius Valerius; Quintus Fabius; Publius Postumius
Preceded by Gaius Julius; Publius Cornelius; Gaius Servilius	Roman consular tribune with Lucius Furius; Gaius Valerius; Gaius Servilius; 407 BC	Succeeded by Publius Cornelius; Gnaeus Cornelius; Numerius Fabius; Lucius Valerius
