= Friedrich Münzer =

German historian and classical philologist (1868–1942)

Friedrich Münzer (22 April 1868 – 20 October 1942) was a German classical scholar noted for the development of prosopography, particularly for his demonstrations of how family relationships in ancient Rome connected to political struggles. He died in Theresienstadt concentration camp.

== Biography ==
He was born at Oppeln, Silesia (now Opole, Poland), into a Jewish merchant family, went to Leipzig University and then in 1887 to Berlin University, where he wrote his thesis De Gente Valeria under the supervision of Otto Hirschfeld. In 1893 he traveled to Rome, where Georg Wissowa recruited him to write biographical articles for the Realencyclopädie der classischen Altertumswissenschaft. From there he went to Athens and participated in excavations on the Acropolis. He also met Clara Engels there; they were married two years later, on 4 September 1897.

Meanwhile, Münzer had been appointed as an unsalaried lecturer at University of Basel in 1896; he and Clara were supported by their parents and his article-writing. (When applying for the job, he reported himself as a member of the Evangelical Lutheran Church; three years earlier his CV had said he was of Jewish faith.) He was promoted to the second chair in classical philology in 1902. In 1912 he accepted a post at Königsberg, which made him an official in the German civil service.

Clara died in the Spanish flu pandemic on 15 December 1918; and in 1921, the widower took up a post at the University of Münster. His greatest work, Römische Adelsparteien und Adelsfamilien (Roman noble parties and noble families") had appeared in 1920 and brought him fame for the first time.

He was appointed a dean at the university in 1923, and in 1924 married a widow, Clara Lunke née Ploeger, becoming a stepfather to two teenagers.

=== Nazi persecution ===
Münzer was generally apolitical, but politics began to catch up with him in 1933 in the form of the law that sought to dismiss Communists, "non-Aryans", and opponents of the Nazi Party. Civil servants appointed before 1914 were officially exempt, but his biographers attribute his continued employment to the intercession of influential colleagues and former students. In January 1935 a new law required the removal of all lecturers and professors over the age of 65 (a move to make available more posts for Nazi sympathizers), and Münzer formally retired on 23 July 1935.

His wife died in 1935 as well, and on 14 November of that year he was officially classified as Jewish, upon which many colleagues and acquaintances distanced themselves from him. Nevertheless, he continued to write biographical articles for Pauly-Wissowa, and they continued to accept them, in spite of a law forbidding Jews to publish. In 1938 a new law compelled him to adopt a Jewish middle name, and he became officially known as "the Jew Friedrich Israel Münzer". In a letter of 12 December 1938 to Ronald Syme, he wrote that the changed situation "deeply depressed" him, but that he still considered himself better off than many others.

Despite the urgings of some friends, he refused to emigrate. But in July 1942 he was taken by the Gestapo to the Theresienstadt concentration camp. His adopted daughter Margerete won some privileges for him, such as the right to send and receive letters, and to receive his suitcase intact, and ultimately a release from Theresienstadt. But an epidemic of enteritis had been sweeping through the camp, and he succumbed to it the very same day that Margerete received the notice that her father was to be released.

== Works ==
- De Gente Valeria ("The Valeria gens, Berlin Dissertation, published Oppeln, 1891)
- Die Entstehung der Historien des Tacitus ("The Origin of the Histories of Tacitus", 1901)
- Cacus der Rinddieb ("Cacus the cattle thief", 1911)
- Roman Aristocratic Parties and Families (The Johns Hopkins University Press, 1999), Thérèse Ridley translation of the original Römische Adelsparteien und Adelsfamilien (J. B. Metzler, Stuttgart, 1920), adding sketches of the work's content and significance, and author biography: Ronald T. Ridley "Friedrich Münzer's Roman Aristocratic Parties and Families", XIX-XXXVIII; Thérèse Ridley "The Fate of a Historian", XXXIX-LVII; and a photograph of Münzer opposite the title page translation
- Die Entstehung des römischen Principats ("The Origin of Imperial Rome", 1927)
- thousands of biography articles in the Pauly-Wissowa RE: nomina gentilicia from C to P
