= Gaius Servilius Axilla =

5th-century BC Roman statesman and senator

- Office: Consul (427 BC); Consular tribune (419–417 BC); Magister equitum (418 BC)

Gaius Servilius Axilla (or Servilius Structus; fl. c. 427–417 BC) was a Roman aristocrat and statesman during the early Republic. He held the senior executive offices of consul in 427 BC and consular tribune in 419, 418 and 417 BC. He also served as master of the horse (magister equitum), or deputy, to the dictator Quintus Servilius Priscus Fidenas in 418 BC, when the latter had been appointed to wage war against the Aequi.

== Conflicting traditions ==
Ancient sources present confused and conflicting accounts of the identity of Servilius and the offices he held. In the tradition of the Fasti Capitolini, a list of Roman magistrates compiled during the rule of emperor Augustus, one single person, Servilius Axilla, held the offices of consul in 427 BC, consular tribune in 419–417 and magister equitum in 418. In the histories of Livy and Diodoros, there is no mention of any Servilius as tribune in 419 BC. For 418, Livy gives the tribune no surname at all and identifies him as a son of the dictator Servilius Priscus Fidenas, but is unsure whether he or one other Servilius Ahala held the office of magister equitum that year. Finally, for 417, Livy has one Servilius Structus holding office of tribune for the second time, though he does not specify when the first time was. Weber thought that Livy preserved a more genuine tradition and that the official Fasti had been tampered with, but Mommsen and Münzer, followed by Broughton, have preferred to follow the evidence of the Fasti, identifying all of the recorded officeholders as one person and explaining variations in the narrative as the result of interpolation by annalists.

Servilius's surname is also confused in the sources. The Fasti call him Gaius Servilius Axilla, son of Quintus and grandson of Gaius. Livy uses the more common variant Ahala, while some other sources offer the surname Structus instead. Mommsen and Münzer partly explained the problem by again postulating annalistic interpolations, but Weber here argues that Structus, and not Axilla or Ahala, is more likely to be correct. Weber suggests that later sources mistakenly applied the surname Axilla and its variant Ahala to the consul of 427 BC by confusing him with a later relative who had a similar career, Gaius Servilius Ahala, consular tribune and magister equitum in 408. Weber also proposed, against Mommsen, identifying Servilius 'Axilla' with Gaius Servilius Ahala, the famous murderer of Spurius Maelius.

== Endnotes ==
Political offices
Preceded by Aulus Cornelius Cossus; Titus Quinctius Poenus Cincinnatus	Roman consul 427 BC; With: Lucius Papirius Mugillanus	Succeeded by consular tribunes
