= Patrician (ancient Rome) =

Hereditary nobility of ancient Rome

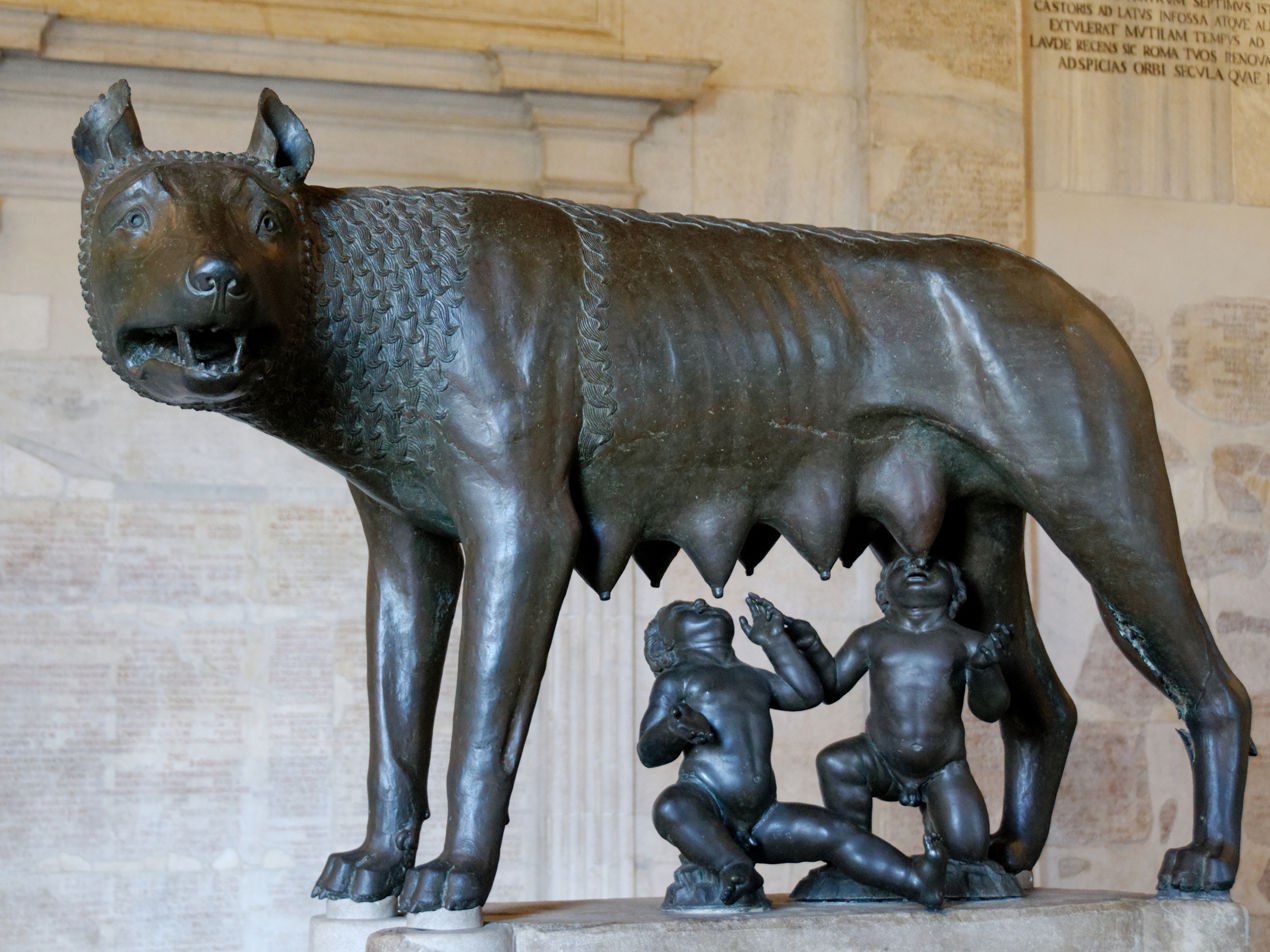
Romulus and his brother, Remus, with the she-wolf. Romulus is credited with creating the patrician class.

The patricians (from Latin: patricius) were originally a group of ruling class families in ancient Rome. The distinction was highly significant in the Roman Kingdom and the early Republic, but its relevance waned after the Conflict of the Orders (494 BC to 287 BC). By the time of the late Republic and Empire, membership in the patriciate was of only nominal significance. The social structure of ancient Rome revolved around the distinction between the patricians and the plebeians. The status of patricians gave them more political power than the plebeians, but the relationship between the groups eventually caused the Conflict of the Orders. In this period the social structure of ancient Rome changed.

After the Western Empire fell, the term "patrician" continued as a high honorary title in the Eastern Empire. In many medieval Italian republics, especially in Venice and Genoa, medieval patrician classes were once again formally defined groups of leading families. In the Holy Roman Empire, the Grand Burgher families had a similar meaning. Subsequently, "patrician" became a vague term used to refer to aristocrats and the higher bourgeoisie in many countries, and "plebeian" came to be used for people of lower social classes.

== Origin ==
According to Livy, the first hundred men appointed senators by Romulus were referred to as "fathers" (Latin patres), and the descendants of those men became the patrician class. This account is also described by Cicero. The appointment of these one hundred men into the Senate gave them a noble status. That status is what separated the patricians from the plebeians. Some accounts detail that the one hundred men were chosen because of their wisdom. This would coincide with the idea that ancient Rome was founded on a merit-based ideal. According to other opinions, the patricians (patricii) were those who could point to fathers, i.e., those who were members of the clans (gentes) whose members originally comprised the whole citizen body.

Other noble families that came to Rome during the time of the kings were also admitted to the patriciate, including several who emigrated from Alba Longa, after that city was destroyed by Tullus Hostilius. The last-known instance of a gens being admitted to the patriciate prior to the first century BC was when the Claudii were added to the ranks of the patricians after coming to Rome in 504 BC, five years after the establishment of the Republic.

The criteria applied by Romulus to choose certain men for this class remain contested by academics and historians, but the importance of the patrician/plebeian distinction is accounted by all as paramount to ancient Roman society. The distinction between the noble class, the patricians, and the Roman populace, the plebeians, existed from the beginning of ancient Rome. This distinction became increasingly important in the society until the period of the late republic.

The patricians were given noble status when named to the Senate, giving them wider political influence than the plebeians, at least in the times of the early Republic. The patricians in ancient Rome were of the same status as aristocrats in Greek society. Being of the noble class meant that patricians were able to participate in government and politics, while the plebeians could not. This privilege was important in ancient Roman history and eventually caused a large divide between the two classes.

During the middle and late Republic, as this influence gradually eroded, plebeians were granted equal rights in most areas, and even greater in some. For example, only plebeians could serve as the tribune of the plebs. There were quotas for official offices. One of the two consulships was reserved for plebeians. Although being a patrician remained prestigious, it was of minimal practical importance. With the exception of some religious offices which were devoid of political power, plebeians were able to stand for all of the offices that were open to patricians. Plebeians of the senatorial class were no less wealthy than patricians at the height of the republic. Originally patrician, Publius Clodius Pulcher willingly arranged to be adopted by a plebeian family in order to qualify to be appointed as the tribune of the plebs.

== Roman Republic and Empire ==
=== Status ===
Patricians historically had more privileges and rights than plebeians. This status difference was marked at the beginning of the Republic: patricians were better represented in the Roman assemblies, and only patricians could hold high political offices, such as dictator, consul, and censor, and all priesthoods (such as pontifex maximus) were closed to non-patricians. There was a belief that patricians communicated better with the Roman gods, so they alone could perform the sacred rites and take the auspices.

Additionally, not only were the patricians of higher status in political offices but they also had the best land in ancient Rome. Having the best land allowed the patrician class to have more opportunities, such as being able to produce better agriculture. This view had political consequences, since in the beginning of the year or before a military campaign, Roman magistrates used to consult the gods. Livy reports that the first admission of plebeians into a priestly college happened in 300 BC with the passage of the Lex Ogulnia when the College of Augurs raised their number from four to nine. After that, plebeians were accepted into the other religious colleges. By the end of the Republic, only priesthoods with limited political importance, such as the Salii, the Flamines, and the Rex Sacrorum, were filled exclusively by patricians.

While it was not illegal for a plebeian to run for political office, a plebeian would not have had the backing needed to win a seat. Since society was organized in this way, the patrician class was essentially in control of ancient Rome's government. In Cassius' accounts of ancient Rome, he details how important and advantaged the patrician class was over the plebeian class. He indicates the status difference between patricians and plebeians by detailing the specific shoes the patricians wore. Cassius states, "For the shoes worn by the patricians in the city were ornamented with laced straps and the design of the letter, to signify that they were descended from the original hundred men that had been senators." It is clear through Cassius' account that these details mattered and represented the differentiation between classes.

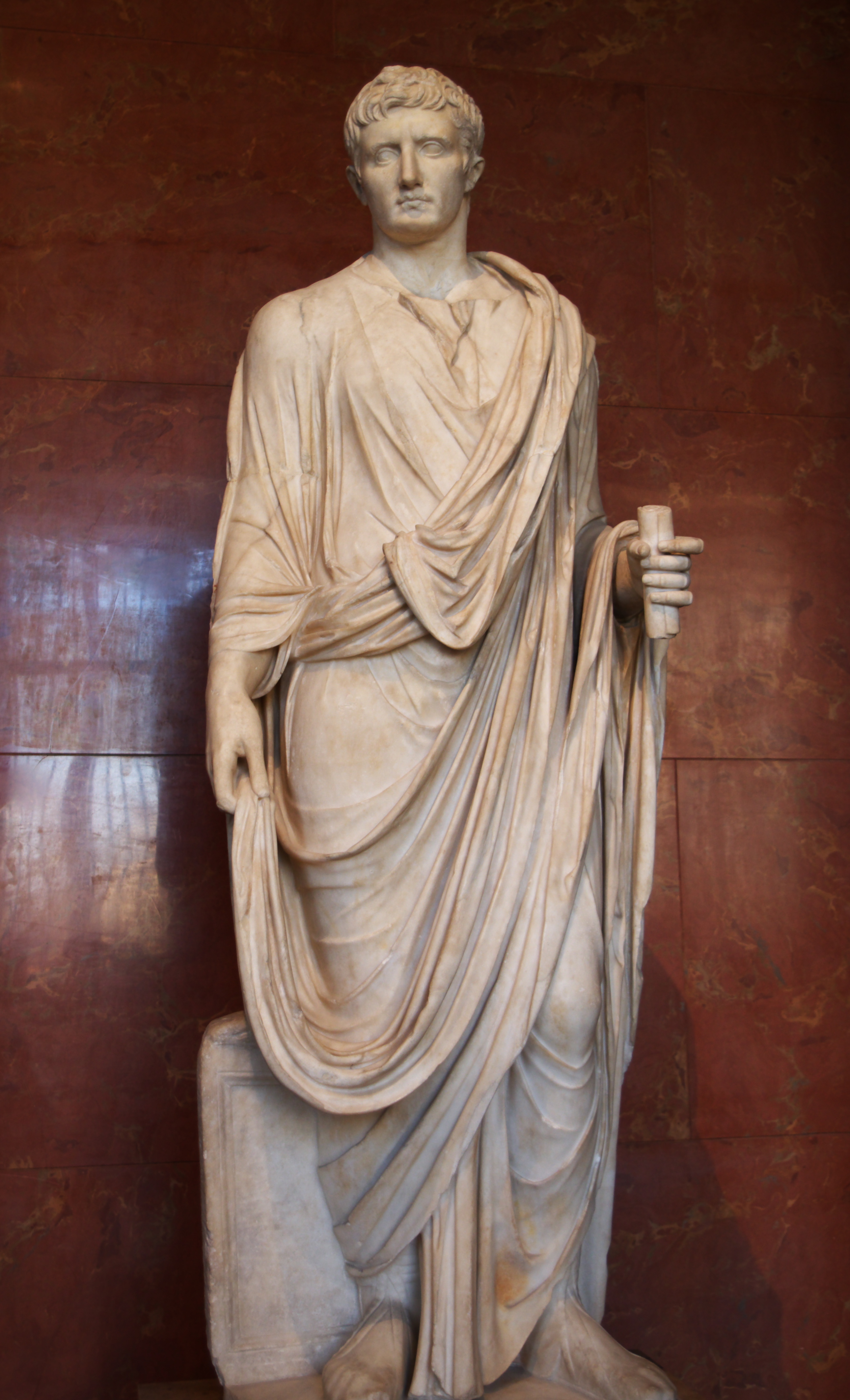
Statue of Augustus (Louvre). Born into an equestrian family of the gens Octavia, he was later adopted by Julius Caesar into the patrician Julii.

Few plebeian names appear in lists of Roman magistrates during the early Republic. Two laws passed during the fourth century BC began the gradual opening of magistrates to the plebeians: the Lex Licinia Sextia of 367 BC, which established the right of plebeians to hold the consulship; and the Genucian Law of 342 BC, which required that at least one of the consuls be a plebeian (although this law was frequently violated for several decades).

Many of the ancient patrician gentes whose members appear in the founding legends of Rome disappeared as Rome acquired its empire, and new plebeian families rose to prominence. A number of patrician families such as the Horatii, Lucretii, Verginii and Menenii rarely appear in positions of importance during the later republic. Many old families had patrician and plebeian branches, of which the patrician lines frequently faded into obscurity, and were eclipsed by their plebeian namesakes.

The decline accelerated toward the end of the Republic, principally because of the civil wars, from the Social War to the proscriptions of the Triumvirs, which took a heavy toll on them. As a result, several illustrious patrician houses were on the verge of extinction during the first century BC, sometimes only surviving through adoptions, such as:

- Julii Caesares
- Manlii Torquatii
- Cornelii Scipiones
- Papirii Masones
- Postumii Albini
- Servilii Caepiones

However, large gentes with multiple stirpes seem to have coped better; the Aemilii, Claudii, Cornelii, Fabii, Sulpicii, and Valerii all continued to thrive under the Principate.

=== Patricians vs. plebeians ===
The distinction between patricians and plebeians in ancient Rome was based purely on birth. Although modern writers often portray patricians as rich and powerful families who managed to secure power over the less-fortunate plebeian families, plebeians and patricians among the senatorial class were equally wealthy. As civil rights for plebeians increased during the middle and late Roman Republic, many plebeian families had attained wealth and power while some traditionally patrician families had fallen into poverty and obscurity. However, no amount of wealth could change one's class.

=== Marriage ===
A marriage between a patrician and a plebeian was the only way to legally integrate the two classes. However, when the Twelve Tables were written down, the marriage between the two classes was prohibited. This was repealed in 445 BC with the Lex Canuleia. If a marriage was to occur between a patrician and a plebeian, the children of that marriage would then be given patrician status. This law was created to prevent the classes from mixing. However, according to Mathisen, having a recognized marriage, so not illegally marrying into the other class, was important. Having a legally recognized marriage ensured that the children born from the marriage were given Roman citizenship and any property they might inherit.

=== Conflict of the Orders ===
Eventually, the plebeians became unsatisfied with being the lower class and not having the same rights and privileges as the patricians. This time in Roman history is called the Conflict of the Orders, which took place between 500 and 287 BC. Due to the patricians having the political status, the plebeian class had no representation in the government to advocate for their interests. By not having anyone advocating for their interests, this also meant that the plebeians did not always know the laws by which they had to abide. Since the patricians were of high social status, they did not want to lose this status; they were not in agreement with changing the structure of society by giving plebeians more status. Eventually, the plebeian class created their own governing body, the Council of the Plebs.

Another advancement that came from the Conflict of the Orders was the Twelve Tables. At this time in ancient Rome, the monarchy had been overthrown. The plebeians wanted to know the laws, which resulted in the written form of laws: the Twelve Tables. Even once these laws were written down, and the new Centuriate Assembly was created, the patrician class remained in power. The assembly separated citizens into classes, however, the top two classes, Equites and Patricians, controlled the majority of the vote. This meant, that while the plebeians were able to vote, if the patrician classes voted together, they could control the vote. Ancient Rome, according to Ralph Mathisen, author of Ancient Roman Civilization: History and Sources, made political reforms, such as the introduction of the Council of the Plebs and the tribunes of the plebs. These two political bodies were created to give the plebeians a voice. After the Conflict of the Orders, according to Mathisen, Plebeians were able to rise in politics and become members of the Senate, which previously had been exclusively for patricians.

=== Fading of distinction ===
A series of laws diminished the distinction between the two classes, including Lex Canuleia (445 BC; which allowed the marriage—ius connubii—between patricians and plebeians), Leges Liciniae Sextiae (367 BC; which made restrictions on possession of public lands—ager publicus—and also made sure that one of the consuls was plebeian), Lex Ogulnia (300 BC; plebeians received access to priest posts), and Lex Hortensia (287 BC; verdicts of plebeian assemblies—plebiscita—now bind all people). Gradually, by the late Republic, most distinctions between patricians and plebeians had faded away.

By Julius Caesar's time so few of the patriciate were left that a special law was made, the Lex Cassia, for the enrollment of new patricians. This was followed by Augustus under the Lex Saenia, and continued by later emperors such as Claudius. The last patrician families of the Republic went extinct in the Imperial period, and the latest known members of the "original" patrician houses are Servius Cornelius Dolabella Metilianus Pompeius Marcellus or possibly the Cornelii Scipiones Salvidieni Orfiti.

=== Patrician families ===
The following gentes were regarded as patrician, although they may have had plebeian members or branches.

- Aebutia
- Aemilia
- Aquillia
- Aternia
- Claudia
- Cloelia
- Cornelia
- Curtia
- Fabia
- Foslia
- Furia
- Gegania
- Genucia
- Herminia
- Horatia
- Julia
- Lartia
- Lucretia
- Manlia
- Menenia
- Nautia
- Numicia
- Papiria
- Pinaria
- Postumia
- Potitia
- Quinctia
- Quinctilia
- Romilia
- Sempronia
- Sergia
- Servilia
- Sestia
- Sulpicia
- Tarpeia
- Tarquitia
- Tullia
- Valeria
- Verginia
- Veturia
- Vitellia
- Volumnia

A number of other gentes originally belonged to the patricians but were known chiefly for their plebeian branches.

- Antonia
- Atilia
- Cassia
- Cominia
- Curiatia
- Hostilia
- Junia
- Marcia
- Metilia
- Minucia
- Mucia
- Pollia
- Tarquinia

==== Gentes maiores et minores ====
Among the patricians, certain families were known as the gentes maiores, the greatest or perhaps the most noble houses. The other patrician families were called the gentes minores. Whether this distinction had any legal significance is not known, but it has been suggested that the princeps senatus, or Speaker of the Senate, was traditionally chosen from the gentes maiores.

No list of the gentes maiores has been discovered, and even their number is unknown. It has been suggested that the Aemilii, Claudii, Cornelii, Fabii, Manlii, and Valerii were amongst them. The Dictionary of Greek and Roman Biography and Mythology suggests that the gentes maiores consisted of families that settled at Rome in the time of Romulus, or at least before the destruction of Alba Longa. The noble Alban families that settled in Rome in the time of Tullus Hostilius then formed the nucleus of the gentes minores. These included the Julii, Tulii, Servilii, Quinctii, Geganii, Curtii, and Cloelii.

However, Harper's Dictionary of Classical Antiquities suggests that the Alban families were also included among the gentes maiores, and that the gentes minores consisted of the families admitted to the patriciate under the Tarquins and in the early years of the Republic. In any case, the distinction cannot have been based entirely on priority, because the Claudii did not arrive at Rome until after the expulsion of the kings.

=== Patrician demographics until the end of the Roman Republic ===
By the end of the Roman Republic in the late first century BC, however, the patriciate had undergone a profound numerical and political decline, becoming a small, socially prestigious but largely symbolic elite within a broader ruling class dominated by the senatorial nobility (nobiles).

Because no comprehensive census of patrician households survives, modern estimates of patrician numbers are reconstructed from literary sources, magistrate and priesthood lists, inscriptions, and prosopographical analysis. Although precise figures cannot be established, there is broad scholarly agreement that the patriciate experienced a long-term demographic contraction from the archaic period through the civil wars of the late Republic.

==== Background and definition ====
In Roman usage, patrician status was hereditary and restricted to families traditionally believed to descend from the original patres (senators) of the early Roman state. During the monarchy and early Republic, patricians monopolised the highest magistracies, major priesthoods, and legal authority.

By the middle Republic, however, elite status increasingly depended on public distinction and access to high office rather than birth alone. Membership in the ruling aristocracy was expressed through the concept of nobilitas, meaning public recognition derived from holding senior magistracies through the cursus honorum. Both patricians and plebeians could belong to the nobiles once their families had achieved such offices.

==== Cause 1. Decline of political power ====
During the Conflict of the Orders (fifth–third centuries BC), plebeians gradually obtained full access to political offices, priesthoods, and legal protections. By the middle Republic, the Senate rather than the patrician order had become the central governing institution, and elite status was increasingly defined by wealth, military achievement, and senatorial rank rather than by patrician birth alone.

By the late Republic, many of Rome’s most influential figures—including Cicero and Pompey—were plebeians or novi homines rather than patricians. Patrician birth continued to confer social prestige but no longer guaranteed political dominance.

==== Cause 2. Demographic contraction of patrician families ====
Over several centuries, the number of surviving patrician families declined sharply. Contributing factors included:

- Extinction of male family lines
- Low aristocratic birth rates
- The high financial and social costs of participation in the cursus honorum
- Political violence, assassinations, and exile
- Proscriptions during periods of civil war, notably under Sulla and the Second Triumvirate

The civil wars of the first century BC were particularly destructive. Large numbers of senators and aristocrats were executed or compelled to commit suicide, resulting in the permanent extinction of numerous ancient families. Ronald Syme characterises this period as one of systematic attrition of Rome’s ancient nobility, culminating in the near disappearance of many of the oldest patrician houses by the time of Augustus.

==== Number of patricians over time to the end of the Republic ====
Estimated number of surviving patrician gentes over time
Period	Approximate date	Estimated patrician gentes	Notes
Founding era	c. 753 BC	50–150	Traditional accounts; legendary period
Early Republic	fifth century BC	40–120	Gradual attrition during the Conflict of the Orders
Middle Republic	third century BC	30–90	Expansion and social mobility reduce patrician dominance
Late Republic	second century BC	25–60	Decline accelerates amid political instability
End of Republic	27 BC	30–40	Civil wars and proscriptions; patriciate becomes rare

==== Estimated population at the end of the Republic ====
Because no complete census of patrician families survives, historians reconstruct population estimates using magistrate lists, priesthood records, epigraphic evidence, and genealogical reconstructions. Modern scholarship suggests that by the final decades of the Republic:

- Approximately 30–40 patrician gentes still survived (e.g. the Claudians, Julians, and Cornelians).
- The number of adult male patricians likely ranged between 100 and 200
- The total patrician population, including women and children, was probably between 300 and 800 individuals

By comparison, the Roman citizen population numbered in the millions, while the Senate alone comprised about 600 members, the majority of whom were plebeian nobiles (coming from Nobiles, i.e. indicating that one was "well known"). The nobiles were patrician or plebeian, and were defined by their accession to the high offices of state as pursued through the Cursus honorum. The increasing dominance of non-patrician senatorial families is well documented in studies of political mobility during this period.

==== Religious and symbolic significance ====
Despite their political eclipse, patricians retained exclusive access to certain ancient priesthoods, reinforcing their ceremonial importance within Roman society. Livy’s narrative emphasises the early monopoly of patricians over religious and political offices, a dominance that steadily eroded over time.

By the late Republic, patrician status functioned primarily as an honorary marker of antiquity rather than a determinant of real power.

==== Transition into the Empire ====
By the establishment of the Roman Empire in 27 BC, the patrician class had become so numerically reduced that Augustus—himself adopted into the patrician gens Julia but born into the plebeian Octavii—deliberately replenished the order by granting patrician rank to selected families. Under the Principate, the patriciate became a largely imperial honorific rather than an autonomous political class.

==== Significance ====
The long-term demographic decline of the patricians illustrates a central transformation in Roman society: the shift from a narrow hereditary aristocracy to a broader, more flexible ruling elite. While patrician lineage retained symbolic value, political power in the late Republic and early Empire rested primarily on senatorial office, wealth, ability, and imperial favour rather than ancient birth.

== Late Roman and Byzantine period ==
Portrait of a Noblewoman, a funerary portrait of a woman from Roman Egypt, second century AD

Patrician status still carried a degree of prestige at the time of the early Roman Empire, and Roman emperors routinely elevated their supporters to the patrician class en masse. This prestige gradually declined further, and by the end of the Crisis of the Third Century patrician status, as it had been known in the Republic, ceased to have meaning in everyday life. The emperor Constantine the Great (r. 306–337) reintroduced the term as the empire's senior honorific title, not tied to any specific administrative position, and from the first limited to a very small number of holders. The historian Zosimus states that in Constantine's time, the holders of the title ranked even above the praetorian prefects. Under Constantine, the title was for life and not hereditary.

In the late Western Roman Empire, the title was sparingly used and retained its high prestige, being awarded, especially in the fifth century, to the powerful magistri militum who dominated the state, such as Stilicho, Constantius III, Flavius Aetius, Comes Bonifacius, and Ricimer. The patrician title was occasionally used in Western Europe after the end of the Roman Empire; for instance, Pope Stephen II granted the title "Patricius of the Romans" to the Frankish ruler Pepin the Short. The revival of patrician classes in medieval Italian city-states, and also north of the Alps, is covered in patricianship.

The eastern emperor Zeno (r. 474–491) granted it to Odoacer to legitimize the latter's rule in Italy after his overthrow of the rebellious magister militum Orestes and his son Romulus Augustulus in 476. In the Eastern Empire, Theodosius II (r. 408–450) barred eunuchs from holding it, although this restriction had been overturned by the sixth century. Under Justinian I (r. 527–565), the title proliferated and was consequently somewhat devalued, as the emperor opened it to all those above illustris rank, i.e. the majority of the Senate.

Roman mosaic depicting a noblewoman as Venus, assisted by two maidservants, from the Sidi Ghrib baths in Tunisia, fifth century AD

In the eighth century, in the Eastern Roman Empire, the title was further lowered in the court order of precedence, coming after the magistros and the anthypatos. However it remained one of the highest in the imperial hierarchy until the eleventh century, being awarded to the most important strategoi (provincial governors and generals, allies) of the Empire. In the court hierarchy, the eunuch patrikioi enjoyed higher precedence, coming before even the anthypatoi-Latn. The title was also granted to important allied foreign rulers, as the early Bulgarian ruler Kubrat, whose ring A was inscribed in Greek XOBPATOY and ring C was inscribed XOBPATOY ПATPIKIOY, indicating the dignity of Patrikios (Patrician) that he had achieved in the Byzantine world.

According to the late ninth-century Kletorologion, the insignia of the dignity were ivory inscribed tablets. During the eleventh century, the dignity of patrikios followed the fate of other titles: extensively awarded, it lost in status, and disappeared during the Komnenian period in the early twelfth century. The title of prōtopatrikios (πρωτοπατρίκιος, "first patrician") is also evidenced in the East from 367 to 711, possibly referring to the senior-most holder of the office and leader of the patrician order (taxis). The feminine variant patrikia (πατρικία) denoted the spouses of patrikioi; it is not to be confused with the title of zostē patrikia ("girded patrikia"), which was a unique dignity conferred on the ladies-in-waiting of the empress.

== See also ==
- Nobility
- Aristocracy
- Nederland's Patriciaat

== Sources ==
- Bury, J. B.; Philotheus (1911). The Imperial Administrative System of the Ninth Century (With a Revised Text of the Kletorologion of Philotheos). London: Oxford University Press.
- Clay, Agnes Muriel (1911). "Patricians" . In Chisholm, Hugh (ed.). Encyclopædia Britannica. Vol. 20 (11th ed.). Cambridge University Press. pp. 931–933.
- Kazhdan, Alexander, ed. (1991). Oxford Dictionary of Byzantium. Oxford University Press. ISBN 978-0-19-504652-6.
- Kardaras, Georgios (2018). Byzantium and the Avars 6th-9th Century AD. Brill. pp. 99–100. ISBN 9789004382268.
- Vachkova, Veselina (2008). "Danube Bulgaria and Khazaria as part of the Byzantine oikoumene". In Curta, Florin; Kovalev, Roman (eds.). The Other Europe in the Middle Ages: Avars, Bulgars, Khazars and Cumans. Brill. pp. 339–362. ISBN 9789004163898.
