= Consular tribune =

Putative archaic Roman executive magistracy

A consular tribune was putatively a type of magistrate in the early Roman Republic. According to Roman tradition, colleges of consular tribunes held office throughout the fifth and fourth centuries BC during the so-called "Conflict of the Orders". The ancient historian Livy offered two explanations: the Roman state could have needed more magistrates to support its military endeavors; alternatively, the consular tribunate was offered in lieu of the ordinary consulship to plebeians so as to maintain a patrician lock on the consulship.

Modern views have challenged this account for various reasons. No consular tribune ever celebrated a triumph, and appointment of military dictators was unabated through this period. Furthermore, the vast majority of consular tribunes elected were patrician. Some modern scholars believe the consular tribunes were elected to support Rome's expanded military presence in Italy or otherwise to command detachments and armies. More critical views believe the consular tribunate is an invention of later Roman historians meant to explain the appointment of multiple military commanders in the early republic while also trying to reconcile that with a preconceived notion of a permanent two-man consulship.

== Name ==
Roman sources used a variety of names to refer to consular tribunes. Livy called them tribuni militum (tribunes of the soldiers) or tribuni militares (military tribunes) consulari potestate (with consular power), but also as tribunes pro consulibus or pro consule, as well as simply tribuni consulares (consular tribunes). The emperor Claudius and Aulus Gellius called them tribunes consulari imperio (with consular imperium).

== Traditional account ==
Under Roman tradition, starting in 444 BC, consular tribunes were elected in place of consuls as chief magistrates in fifty-one elections between 444 and 367 BC (seventy per cent of the time) and even more commonly between 408 and 367 BC. Livy offered two explanations: that increased demands for military leadership meant more magistrates were necessary or that it was a political tactic related to the Conflict of the Orders in which patricians prevented plebeians from holding the consulship by substituting this tribunate.

Livy states then that the choice of whether a collegium of consular tribunes or consuls were to be elected for a given year was made by a decree of the Senate, producing an annual dispute as to which set of magistrates ought to be elected. The number of consular tribunes varied between three and six, and because they were considered colleagues of the two censors, there is sometimes mention of the "eight tribunes".

Originally patrician office holders, they were referred to as military tribunes and were responsible for leading the armies into battle. It was only much later that they were given the anachronistic addition of "with consular power", in an attempt to distinguish them from the military tribunes who were the legionary officers of the middle and late Republic.

The tribunes, like their consular predecessors, exercised consular potestas, indicating they must have been elected by the comitia centuriata, and that the current needs of the state could not be served by the previous consular system. From their initial number of three, the consular tribunes were increased to four for the first time in 426 BC in response to the military situation which saw the Roman state capture and annex Fidenae.

Then in 405 BC, the number of consular tribunes was increased to six for the first time; following that, various sources report show normal elections—when tribunes were elected rather than consuls – of six consular tribunes except in 380 and 376 when nine and four were elected, respectively. The increase was due to the need for the consular tribunes to not only handle the military affairs of Rome but also the administrative needs of the city as well. The Roman state was led by six consular tribunes for almost every year down to the dissolution of the office and the reintroduction of the consulship and the creation of the praetorship with the Sextian-Licinian Rogations.

== Modern views ==
The traditional account of the early Republic has come under substantial attack that "it was a literary creation of the late Republic" with little value for reconstructing the actual history of the early republic. As to the consular tribunes specifically, the traditional account in Livy may be reflection of his reliance on Licinius Macer, a previous annalist "fond of finding political motives where none had existed in the earlier historical tradition". Moreover, the early history of Roman military command may reflect annalists "massaging their evidence to make it fit their preconceptions about the structure of Rome's early government", reflecting Romans' common anachronistic and unhistorical treatment of the past.

The specific chronology in Livy also is questioned: "according to a tradition found in Eutropius, the first consular tribunes did not hold office until as late as 389 [BC]". Scholars also question whether tradition has confused cases where two consular tribunes were elected (due to fluctuation in numbers) with election of "consuls". All in all, it appears "suspiciously like these [traditional] explanations are simply inferences made from the most obvious differences between the two magistracies [the consular tribunate and the consulship]".

=== Military need ===
Scholars also have rejected the emergence of the consular tribunate from the Conflict of the Orders: "Long ago [i.e., 1924], Meyer rejected Livy's assertion that the consular tribunate was a product of the Conflict of the Orders and instead suggested that increasing competition among patrician families drove up the annual number of commanders". The explanation that the consular tribunate was created to provide plebeians with access to the highest magistracy by a different name also is unconvincing insofar as those plebeians elected are few and late in this tribunate's history. In fact, after the institution of the consular tribunate, no plebeians appear in the fasti for 43 years from 444 to 401 BC.

Some modern scholars hold that the selection of consular tribunes reflected Rome's expanded military and administrative needs: that the consular tribunes, elected from the three ancient tribes of the Titienses, Ramnenses, and Luceres, were part of an overall redesign of the military structure of the Roman state to maximize military efficiency, which included the creation of the censorship (responsible for taking the census to identify the numbers of men capable of military duty) and the quaestorship (responsible for the supply of money and goods for the armies). Their appointment coincides with Roman expansion into central Italy; election of larger boards of consular tribunes may have been driven by military necessity. This explanation, however, is also somewhat incompatible with the continued appointing of military dictators, election of consular tribunes at time of peace, and their general lack of success in the field.

=== Private aristocrats ===
More recently, some authors have argued that consular tribunes may have merely been aristocrats leading their own clients and retainers as private warbands or raiding parties before the Roman state developed its monopoly on military activity. R. Ross Holloway suggests that individual warlords, whose names and deeds (whether real or fictitious) would have been preserved in family traditions and records, were later anachronistically labeled "tribunes" (or consuls) by compilers who lived in a time when public office and military command went hand in hand.

Fred Drogula argued that consular tribunes and fictitious proconsulships were imputed into the early republic by historians like Livy and Dionysius (or their sources) to rationalise the number of reported officeholders with their preconceived notion of a permanent two-man consulship. Holloway, who is of the view that early Roman history was built upon synchronisms with Greek history – eg the fall of the monarchy being dated to around the same time as the expulsion of the tyrant Hippias from Athens, c. 509 BC – and that the number of consuls was not enough to match the number of years from the supposed beginning of the Republic, believes that consular tribunes were invented to fill the empty spaces in the records of yearly magistrates.

The end of the consular tribunate in 367 BC with the Sextian-Licinian rogations is also "undoubtedly" rejected as being caused by the Conflict of the Orders, attributed instead to increased demands for Roman government and the institutionalisation of military command over a previous system without a fixed number of annual magistrate-commanders.

== List of consular tribunes ==
Consular tribunes presented by Varronian chronology. For more information on deciphering early Roman names, see Roman names.
Date	Consular tribunes For more information on deciphering early Roman names, see Roman names.
Date	Consular tribunes
444 BC	A. Sempronius Atratinus; T. Atilius Luscus; T. Cloelius Siculus
438 BC	Mam. Aemilius Mamercinus; L. Quinctius Cincinnatus; L. Julius Iulus
434 BC	Ser. Cornelius Cossus; M. Manlius Capitolinus; Q. Sulpicius Camerinus Praetextatus
433 BC	M. Fabius Vibulanus; M. Folius Flaccinator; L. Sergius Fidenas
432 BC	L. Pinarius Mamercinus; L. Furius Medullinus; Sp. Postumius Albus Regillensis
426 BC	T. Quinctius Poenus Cincinnatus; C. Furius Pacilus Fusus; M. Postumius Albinus Regillensis; A. Cornelius Cossus
425 BC	A. Sempronius Atratinus; L. Quinctius Cincinnatus; L. Furius Medullinus; L. Horatius Barbatus
424 BC	Ap. Claudius Crassus; Sp. Nautius Rutilus; L. Sergius Fidenas; Sex. Julius Iulus
422 BC	L. Manlius Capitolinus; Q. Antonius Merenda; L. Papirius Mugillanus
420 BC	L. Quinctius Cincinnatus; L. Furius Medullinus; M. Manlius Vulso; A. Sempronius Atratinus
419 BC	Agrippa Menenius Lanatus; P. Lucretius Tricipitinus; Sp. Nautius Rutilus; C. Servilius Axilla
418 BC	L. Sergius Fidenas; M. Papirius Mugillanus; C. Servilius Axilla
417 BC	P. Lucretius Tricipitinus; Agrippa Menenius Lanatus; C. Servilius Axilla; Sp. Rutilius Crassus
416 BC	A. Sempronius Atratinus; M. Papirius Mugillanus; Q. Fabius Vibulanus; Sp. Nautius Rutilus
415 BC	P. Cornelius Cossus; C. Valerius Potitus Volusus; N. Fabius Vibulanus; Q. Quinctius Cincinnatus
414 BC	Cn. Cornelius Cossus; L. Valerius Potitus; Q. Fabius Vibulanus; P. Postumius Albinus Regillensis
408 BC	C. Julius Iulus; P. Cornelius Cossus; C. Servilius Ahala
407 BC	L. Furius Medullinus; C. Valerius Potitus Volusus; N. Fabius Vibulanus; C. Servilius Ahala
406 BC	P. Cornelius Rutilus Cossus; Cn. Cornelius Cossus; N. Fabius Ambustus; L. Valerius Potitus
405 BC	T. Quinctius Capitolinus Barbatus; Q. Quinctius Cincinnatus; C. Julius Iulus; A. Manlius Vulso Capitolinus; L. Furius Medullinus; M'. Aemilius Mamercinus
404 BC	C. Valerius Potitus Volusus; M'. Sergius Fidenas; P. Cornelius Maluginensis; Cn. Cornelius Cossus; K. Fabius Ambustus; Sp. Nautius Rutilus
403 BC	M'. Aemilius Mamercinus; L. Valerius Potitus; Ap. Claudius Crassus Inregillensis; M. Quinctilius Varus; L. Julius Iulus; M. Furius Fusus; M. Postumius Albinus Regillensis; M. Postumius
402 BC	C. Servilius Ahala; Q. Servilius Fidenas; L. Verginius Tricostus Esquilinus; Q. Sulpicius Camerinus Cornutus; A. Manlius Vulso Capitolinus; M'. Sergius Fidenas
401 BC	L. Valerius Potitus; M. Furius Camillus; M'. Aemilius Mamercinus; Cn. Cornelius Cossus; K. Fabius Ambustus; L. Julius Iulus
400 BC	P. Licinius Calvus Esquilinus; P. Manlius Vulso; L. Titinius Pansa Saccus; P. Maelius Capitolinus; Sp. Furius Medullinus; L. Publilius Philo Vulscus
399 BC	Cn. Genucius Augurinus; L. Atilius Priscus; M. Pomponius Rufus; C. Duillius Longus; M. Veturius Crassus Cicurinus; Volero Publilius Philo
398 BC	L. Valerius Potitus; M. Valerius Lactucinus Maximus; M. Furius Camillus; L. Furius Medullinus; Q. Servilius Fidenas; Q. Sulpicius Camerinus Cornutus
397 BC	L. Julius Iulus; L. Furius Medullinus; L. Sergius Fidenas; A. Postumius Albinus Regillensis; P. Cornelius Maluginensis; A. Manlius Vulso Capitolinus
396 BC	L. Titinius Pansa Saccus; P. Licinius Calvus Esquilinus; P. Maelius Capitolinus; Q. Manlius Vulso Capitolinus; Cn. Genucius Augurinus; L. Atilius Priscus
395 BC	P. Cornelius Cossus; P. Cornelius Scipio; K. Fabius Ambustus; L. Furius Medullinus; Q. Servilius Fidenas; M. Valerius Lactucinus Maximus
394 BC	M. Furius Camillus; L. Furius Medullinus; C. Aemilius Mamercinus; L. Valerius Publicola; Sp. Postumius Albinus Regillensis; P. Cornelius
391 BC	L. Lucretius Tricipitinus Flavus; Ser. Sulpicius Camerinus; L. Aemilius Mamercinus; L. Furius Medullinus; Agrippa Furius Fusus; C. Aemilius Mamercinus
390 BC	Q. Fabius Ambustus; K. Fabius Ambustus; N. Fabius Ambustus; Q. Sulpicius Longus; Q. Servilius Fidenas; P. Cornelius Maluginensis
389 BC	L. Valerius Publicola; L. Verginius Tricostus; P. Cornelius; A. Manlius Capitolinus; L. Aemilius Mamercinus; L. Postumius Albinus Regillensis
388 BC	T. Quinctius Cincinnatus Capitolinus; Q. Servilius Fidenas; L. Julius Iulus; L. Aquilius Corvus; L. Lucretius Flavus Tricipitinus; Ser. Sulipicius Rufus
387 BC	L. Papirius Cursor; Cn. Sergius Fidenas Coxo; L. Aemilius Mamercinus; Licinus Menentius Lanatus; L. Valerius Publicola; L. Cornelius
386 BC	M. Furius Camillus; Ser. Cornelius Maluginensis; Q. Servilius Fidenas; L. Quinctius Cincinnatus; L. Horatius Pulvillus; P. Valerius Potitus Publicola
385 BC	A. Manlius Capitolinus; P. Cornelius; T. Quinctius Cincinnatus Capitolinus; L. Quinctius Cincinnatus Capitolinus; L. Papirius Cursor; Cn. Sergius Fidenas Coxo
384 BC	Ser. Cornelius Maluginensis; P. Valerius Potitus Publicola; M. Furius Camillus; Ser. Sulpicius Rufus; C. Papirius Crassus; T. Quinctius Cincinnatus Capitolinus
383 BC	L. Valerius Publicola; A. Manlius Capitolinus; Ser. Sulpicius Rufus; L. Lucretius Flavus Tricipitinus; L. Aemilius Mamercinus; M. Trebonius
382 BC	Sp. Papirius Crassus; L. Papirius Mugillanus; Ser. Cornelius Maluginensis; Q. Servilius Fidenas; C. Sulpicius Camerinus; L. Aemilius Mamercinus
381 BC	M. Furius Camillus; A. Postumius Albinus Regillensis; L. Postumius Albinus Regillensis; L. Furius Medullinus; L. Lucretius Tricipitinus Flavus; M. Fabius Ambustus
380 BC	L. Valerius Publicola; P. Valerius Potitus Publicola; Ser. Cornelius Maluginensis; Licinus Menentius Lanatus; C. Sulpicius Peticus; L. Aemilius Mamercinus; Cn. Sergius Fidenas Coxo; Ti. Papirius Crassus; L. Papirius Mugillanus
379 BC	P. Manlius Capitolinus; C. Manlius; L. Julius Iulus; C. Sextilius; M. Albinius; L. Antistius
378 BC	Sp. Furius; Q. Servilius Fidenas; Licinus Menenius Lanatus; P. Cloelius Siculus; M. Horatius; L. Geganius Macerinus
377 BC	L. Aemilius Mamercinus; P. Valerius Potitus Publicola; C. Veturius Crassus Cicurinus; Ser. Sulpicius Rufus; L. Quinctius Cincinnatus; C. Quinctius Cincinnatus
376 BC	L. Papirius Mugillanus; Licinus Menenius Lanatus; Ser. Cornelius Maluginensis; Ser. Sulpicius Praetextatus
370 BC	L. Furius Medullinus; A. Manlius Capitolinus; Ser. Sulpicius Praetextatus; Ser. Cornelius Maluginensis; P. Valerius Potitus Publicola; C. Valerius Potitus
369 BC	Q. Servilius Fidenas; C. Veturius Crassus Cicurinus; A. Cornelius Cossus; M. Cornelius Maluginensis; Q. Quinctius Cincinnatus; M. Fabius Ambustus
368 BC	T. Quinctius Cincinnatus Capitolinus; Ser. Cornelius Maluginensis; Ser. Sulpicius Praetextatus; Sp. Servilius Structus; L. Papirius Crassus; L. Veturius Crassus Cicurinus
367 BC	A. Cornelius Cossus; M. Cornelius Maluginensis; M. Geganius Macerinus; P. Manlius Capitolinus; L. Veturius Crassus Cicurinus; P. Valerius Potitus Publicola

== See also ==
- Constitution of the Roman Republic
