= Proculus Verginius Tricostus =

5th century BC consul of the Roman Republic

Proculus (or Lucius) Verginius Tricostus was a consul of the Roman Republic in 435 BC. He was possibly re-elected as consul in 434 BC.

Verginius belonged to the patrician Verginia gens which had flourished in the early years of the Republic but would fade into obscurity in the early 4th century BC. Verginius was most likely a grandson or great-grandson of Opiter Verginius Tricostus, consul in 502 BC, but as no filiation has survived in our sources it is impossible to trace his descent. If his praenomen is Lucius, there is a possibility that he can be identified as the father to Lucius Verginius Tricostus Esquilinus, the consular tribune in 402 BC.

== Career ==
Verginius was elected consul in 435 BC together with Gaius Julius. The year was occupied by the rising threat from the Fidenates and a dictator was appointed to resolve the situation. The dictator, Servilius Fidenas, saw great success in the war and Fidenae itself was captured. The year also saw the election of two censors, Gaius Furius Pacilus Fusus and Marcus Geganius Macerinus, who for the first time held the census at the Villa Publica in the Campus Martius.

In some traditions, Verginius and his colleague was re-elected to the consulship the following year and would again relinquish their imperium in favor of another appointment of a dictator. The new dictator, Mamercus Aemilius Mamercinus, fought the Falerii and Etruria and enacted a law limiting the censorship down to a term of one and half year from the previous term of five years.

The tradition placing Verginius as consul re-elect in 434 BC is based mainly on Livy who in turn cites Licinius Macer. Livy also provides a second tradition placing Marcus Manlius Capitolinus Vulso and Quintus Sulpicius Camerinus Praetextatus as consuls for the year, this based on the writings of Valerius Antias and Aelius Tubero. As the writings of Licinius, Valerius and Aelius are all lost, we can only base it on the references given by Livy. A third version of the college of 434 is provided by Diodorus Siculus who lists both Manlius and Sulpicius and a third individual, Servius Cornelius Cossus, as consular tribunes, not consuls, during the year. The modern consensus generally favor the second or third tradition, with the classicist Broughton commenting that the re-election of the consuls of 435 remains the least likely version.

Political offices
Preceded by Cornelius Maluginensis; Lucius Papirius Crassus	Roman consul 435 BC with Gaius Julius	Succeeded by Marcus Manlius; Quintus Sulpicius; Servius Cornelius Cossus as consular tribunes
