= Gaius Julius Mento =

5th-century BC Roman politician and consul

Gaius Julius Mento (Note: Livy calls him Gnaeus Julius Mento, but Diodorus gives Gaius; the praenomen Gnaeus is not known to have been used by the Julii.), a member of the patrician gens Julia, held the consulship in 431 BC.

== Family ==
As Mento's filiation has not been preserved, it is not clear how he was related to other members of the Julia gens. He could perhaps have been a son of Vopiscus Julius Iulus, consul in 473 BC. He had a brother named Gaius, and his known sons included Lucius Julius Iulus, who was consular tribune in 438 and consul in 430, and Spurius, whose sons held three tribuneships between 408 and 403 BC. Sextus Julius Iulus who was consular tribune in 424 might also have been his son. Perhaps less likely, Mento could have been the son of Gaius Julius Iulus, the consul of 447 and 435 BC. It is equally possible that Mento was not descended from the Julii Iuli at all, but rather from a more obscure line of the Julii, who by tradition had lived in Rome for a century and a half before the first of them held a Roman magistracy.

== Career ==
Consul in 431 BC with Titus Quinctius Pennus Cincinnatus, Mento quickly found himself at odds with his colleague. During their year of office, the Aequi and the Volsci fortified a position on Mount Algidus, with some chroniclers reporting that the consuls attempted to dislodge them, but were defeated. Owing to this situation, as well as the unease caused by an ongoing epidemic in Rome, the senate directed the consuls to appoint a dictator.

On one thing Mento and Cincinnatus could agree on was they did not want to appoint a dictator. Nevertheless, the clamour to do so was widespread, leading to the tribunes of the plebs threatening to imprison the consuls if they refused to do so. Even as they complained bitterly about the oppression of the masses compelling the action of the consuls by threat of jail, the consuls preferred to yield to popular demands than to the senate. But they could not agree on a dictator, and so drew lots for the nomination, which fell to Cincinnatus. He named his father-in-law, Aulus Postumius Tubertus, to be dictator. Postumius then chose Lucius Julius Iulus to be his magister equitum.

After raising his army, Postumius, together with Cincinnatus, marched towards the Aequi and Volsci leaving the two Julii behind in charge of Rome's defences. The magister equitum manned the city walls, while Mento oversaw domestic affairs. The fighting at Mount Algidus was fierce; the dictator was wounded in the shoulder, and the consul Cincinnatus lost an arm; but the Romans won a decisive victory.

While the army was away, Mento dedicated the Temple of Apollo Medicus, which had been vowed two years earlier in response to the plague that was ravaging the city, and which had continued into Mento's consulship. Ordinarily, the two consuls would have drawn lots for the honour of dedicating the temple, but in the absence of Cincinnatus, the duty fell to Mento. Nonetheless, upon the army's return, Cincinnatus lodged a complaint against Mento in the senate; but the senate took no action.

== See also ==
- Julia (gens)

== Bibliography ==
- Titus Livius (Livy), Ab Urbe Condita (History of Rome).
- Diodorus Siculus, Bibliotheca Historica (Library of History).
- "Mento, C. Julius", in the Dictionary of Greek and Roman Biography and Mythology, William Smith, ed., Little, Brown and Company, Boston (1849).
- T. Robert S. Broughton, The Magistrates of the Roman Republic, American Philological Association (1952).

Political offices
Preceded by Lucius Pinarius Mamercinus, Spurius Postumius Albus Regillensis, and Lucius Furius Medullinus as Military Tribunes with Consular power	Consul of the Roman Republic; 431 BC with Titus Quinctius Poenus Cincinnatus	Succeeded by Lucius Papirius Crassus II, and Lucius Julius Iulus
