= Lucius Julius Iullus (consul) =

Roman consul in 430 BC

- Office: Consular tribune (438 BC); Magister equitum (431 BC); Consul (430 BC)
- Children: Lucius

Lucius Julius Iullus (Note: The original form of his surname was Iullus, which is supported by the literary tradition and is used by all modern sources. The spelling Iulus, with a single 'l', was adopted by the Fasti Capitolini probably after Vergil used it in his Aeneid.) (fl. c. 438–430 BC) was a member of the ancient patrician gens Julia. He was one of the consular tribunes of 438 BC, magister equitum in 431, and consul in 430 BC.

== Family ==
Lucius was the son of Vopiscus Julius Iulus, who had been consul in 473 BC, (Note: Some sources identify Opiter Verginius Tricostus as the consul of 473 BC, in place of Vopiscus Julius.) and grandson of the Gaius Julius Iulus who had been consul in 489. His uncle Gaius was consul in 482 BC, and the Gaius Julius Iulus who was consul in 447 and again in 435 was his cousin. He was the father of Lucius Julius Iulus, consular tribune in 401 and 397 BC. (Note: The Dictionary of Greek and Roman Biography and Mythology identifies Gaius Julius Iulus, consular tribune in 408 and 405 BC, and censor in 393, as Lucius' son, but his filiation in the Fasti Capitolini identifies him as the son of Spurius Julius Iulus, Lucius' brother, and this is followed by Broughton.) The Sextus Julius Iulus who was consular tribune in 424 might have been Lucius' younger brother, or perhaps a cousin.

== Career ==
=== Consular tribune ===
The year before his election, Rome suffered through a severe grain shortage, and in order to forestall famine, a wealthy plebeian merchant named Spurius Maelius, who had purchased large stores of grain, sold it to the people at a low price. The patrician Lucius Minucius Augurinus, who was praefectus annonae, or president of the grain market, accused Maelius of conspiring to overthrow the state, and Lucius Quinctius Cincinnatus was nominated dictator to deal with the emergency. Cincinnatus summoned Maelius to appear before him and answer the charges, and when he refused the merchant was cut down by Gaius Servilius Ahala, the magister equitum. To the plebeians, the accusation and killing of Maelius was nothing short of the murder of someone who had come to their aid, and they refused to permit the election of consuls for the following year. (Note: The plebeians and their tribunes had a very important reason for favouring the election of consular tribunes in place of consuls. While it has been argued that a few of the early consuls were plebeians, none of the consuls elected after the promulgation of the Twelve Tables of Roman Law in BC 451 and 450 came from families traditionally recognized as plebeian (the second decemvirate had pushed through a law forbidding the intermarriage of patricians and plebeians, and may also have formally limited the consulship to patricians), and until the passage of the Licinian Rogations in 367 BC, the consulship was closed to the plebeians. But from the inception of their office, the consular tribunes could be chosen from either order; in practice all of the early tribunes were still patricians, but their election improved the plebeians' chances of magistrates sympathetic to their cause, and eventually plebeians were elected to the office.)

In place of consuls, three men were elected consular tribunes: Mamercus Aemilius Mamercinus, whom Livy calls "a man of high distinction", received the most votes, probably reflecting the confidence the plebeians had in his even-handedness, followed by Lucius Quinctius Cincinnatus, son of the dictator, presumably representing the aristocratic party, and Lucius Julius Iulus. (Note: Diodorus, however, says he was Gaius Julius.) During their year of office, the Latin city of Fidenae, long dominated by Rome, gave its allegiance to the Etruscan Lars Tolumnius, King of Veii. Four envoys were sent to the Fidenates to demand an explanation, and were murdered, ostensibly on the orders of Tolumnius. (Note: Livy is skeptical of a popular story that the ambassadors were killed as the result of an accidental misunderstanding.) The breaking of the alliance and murder of the Roman envoys prompted the Senate to declare war against Veii and its allies, although hostilities would not begin until the following year. The Romans were victorious, and Tolumnius was slain in battle.

=== Magister equitum ===
Seven years later, as Rome was emerging from one of its periodic epidemics, word arrived from Rome's neighbors, the Hernici, that the Aequi and Volsci were rising in arms, and fortifying a position on Mount Algidus. According to some of Livy's sources, the consuls, Titus Quinctius Cincinnatus Pennus and Gaius Julius Mento, engaged the Aequi and Volsci at Mount Algidus and were defeated. Either because of this, or the general state of disarray at Rome, in which the consuls were in perpetual disagreement, a group of moderates urged the tribunes of the plebs to pressure the consuls to name a dictator. The Senate was opposed to this plan, but even as they railed against the presumption of the tribunes to compel the consuls to take action or face imprisonment, Quinctius and Mento preferred to throw in their lot with the people than with the Senate.

Predictably, the consuls could not agree on a candidate, and so the choice fell to Quinctius by lot. He nominated his father-in-law, Aulus Postumius Tubertus, who named Lucius Julius Iulus his master of the horse. Postumius ordered the Latins and Hernici to raise troops, while he assembled a Roman army. When all three forces were ready, the dictator marched for the enemy camp, leaving the Magister Equitum and the consul Julius to defend the city. The battle was extremely fierce; the dictator was wounded in the shoulder, while his cousin, Spurius Postumius Albus, who had been consul the previous year, left the field when his skull was fractured by a rock. The consul Quinctius lost an arm in the fighting, and Marcus Fabius Vibulanus, who in charge of the cavalry, had his thigh pinned to his horse by a lance. But the Romans were victorious, and all of the surviving enemies except for their senators were sold into slavery.

=== Consul ===
In the following year, 430, Lucius was elected consul, together with Gaius Papirius Crassus, over the opposition of the tribunes of the plebs, who had sought to elect consular tribunes instead. (Note: Diodorus Siculus here calls him "Lucius Junius", which is obviously a mistake.) During their year of office, the Aequi sent a delegation to the Senate, requesting a treaty, and were granted an eight-year truce. The Volsci were occupied by internal dissension, and so Rome was at peace. The domestic harmony was threatened, however, when the censors, Lucius Papirius and Publius Pinarius, levied numerous fines, payable only in cattle under the terms of the Lex Aternia Tarpeia of 454 BC, thereby depriving numerous citizens of their cattle in order to enrich the state. The plebeian tribunes intended to propose a law converting the fine from one that was literally pecuniary to one payable in money, (Note: The Dictionary of Greek and Roman Biography and Mythology describes the proposed legislation as "imposing a pecuniary fine instead of the one in cattle", which is ironic given that the word pecuniary is derived from pecus, "cattle", which as a measurement of value predated money; thus a "pecuniary" fine is literally one payable in cattle!) a measure that the people greatly desired. But when one of the tribunes informed the consuls of this plan, Lucius and Papirius anticipated the scheme by proposing the law themselves, thereby depriving the tribunes of what might have been seen as a victory over the patricians.

== See also ==
- Julia gens

== Bibliography ==
- Titus Livius (Livy), Ab Urbe Condita (History of Rome).
- Diodorus Siculus, Bibliotheca Historica (Library of History).
- Marcus Tullius Cicero, De Republica.
- Barthold Georg Niebuhr, The History of Rome, Julius Charles Hare and Connop Thirlwall, trans., John Smith, Cambridge (1828).
- Dictionary of Greek and Roman Biography and Mythology, William Smith, ed., Little, Brown and Company, Boston (1849).
- T. Robert S. Broughton, The Magistrates of the Roman Republic, American Philological Association (1952).

Political offices
Preceded by Titus Quinctius Capitolinus Barbatus VI; Agrippa Menenius Lanatus as consuls	Roman consular tribune 438 with Mamercus Aemilius Mamercinus; Lucius Quinctius Cincinnatus	Succeeded by Marcus Geganius Macerinus III; Lucius Sergius Fidenas as consuls
Preceded by Titus Quinctius Poenus Cincinnatus; Gaius Julius Mento	Roman consul 430 with Gaius Papirius Crassus	Succeeded by Lucius Sergius Fidenas II; Hostus Lucretius Tricipitinus
