= Marcus Fabius Vibulanus (consul 442 BC) =

5th-century BC Roman statesman and consul

Consul of the Roman Republic
- In office 442 – 441 BC Serving with Postumus Aebutius Helva Cornicen
- Preceded by: Marcus Geganius Macerinus; Titus Quinctius Capitolinus Barbatus
- Succeeded by: Gaius Furius Pacilus Fusus; Manius Papirius Crassus

Consular Tribune of the Roman Republic
- In office 433 – 432 BC Serving with Marcus Foslius Flaccinator, Lucius Sergius Fidenas
- Preceded by: Servius Cornelius Cossus; Marcus Manlius Capitolinus Vulso; Quintus Sulpicius Camerinus Praetextatus
- Succeeded by: Lucius Pinarius Mamercinus; Lucius Furius Medullinus; Spurius Postumius Albus Regillensis (consul 432 BC)

Personal details
- Born: Unknown; Ancient Rome
- Died: Unknown; Ancient Rome
- Children: Quintus Fabius Ambustus (tribune)? Numerius Fabius Ambustus? Caeso Fabius Ambustus?
- Parent: Quintus Fabius Vibulanus

Marcus Fabius Vibulanus was consul of the Roman Republic in 442 BC and consular tribune in 433 BC.

Marcus belonged to the influential Fabia gens and was the son of one of the early republic's leading men, Quintus Fabius Vibulanus, consul in 467, 465 and 459 BC. He was probably the elder brother of Quintus Fabius Vibulanus, consul in 423 BC, and Gnaeus Fabius Vibulanus, consul in 421 BC. Filiations indicate that he, or an otherwise unattested Marcus Fabius Ambustus, pontifex maximus in 390 BC, is the father of the three brothers and consular tribunes Caeso Fabius Ambustus, Numerius Fabius Ambustus and Quintus Fabius Ambustus.

== Career ==
Marcus was elected consul in 442 BC together with Postumus Aebutius Hela Cornicen. Their year of office was peaceful and they enacted measures to send commissioners to establish a colony at Ardea. Many Romans wanted the colony to receive the majority of the land distributed, but it was decided to allot it first to the Rutuli, who were native to Ardea, and give the Roman colonists the remaining land.

In 437 BC Rome was involved with wars against the Veii, Falerii and the Fidenae, A dictator, Mamercus Aemilius Mamercinus, was appointed to handle the crisis. Marcus was one of the legates under the dictator and led armies against the Veii.

In 433 BC, Marcus was elected to hold imperium once more, as consular tribune, together with Marcus Folius Flaccinator and Lucius Sergius Fidenas.

Two years later, in 431 BC, he was again appointed legate, serving under the dictator Aulus Postumius Tubertus against the Aequi and Volsci.

Political offices
Preceded by Marcus Geganius Macerinus; Titus Quinctius Capitolinus Barbatus	Consul of the Roman Republic with Postumus Aebutius Helva Cornicen; 442 BC	Succeeded by Gaius Furius Pacilus Fusus; Manius Papirius Crassus
Preceded by Servius Cornelius Cossus; Marcus Manlius Capitolinus Vulso; Quintus Sulpicius Camerinus Praetextatus	Military Tribunes with Consular power with Marcus Foslius Flaccinator and Lucius Sergius Fidenas; 433 BC	Succeeded by Lucius Pinarius Mamercinus; Lucius Furius Medullinus; Spurius Postumius Albus Regillensis (consul 432 BC)
