= Quintus Sulpicius Camerinus Praetextatus =

5th century BC Roman consul

Quintus Sulpicius Camerinus Praetextatus was a consul or consular tribune of the Roman Republic in 434 BC.

Sulpicius belonged to the patrician Sulpicia gens. Sulpicius is the first named member of the branch within the gens known as the Praetextati. Sulpicius was possibly the son of Servius Sulpicius Camerinus Cornutus, consul in 461 and decemvir in 451 BC. Filiations indicate either Praetextatus or Quintus Sulpicius Camerinus Cornutus, consular tribune 402 and 398 BC, as the father of Servius Sulpicius Camerinus, consul suffect in 393 BC and consular tribune in 391 BC. A later Praetextatus named Servius Sulpicius Praetextatus, consular tribune in 377, 376, 370 and 368 BC, is probably a descendant of Quintus Sulpicius.

== Career ==
Sulpicius was elected consul or consular tribune in 434 BC. Livy, basing his account on the writings of Valerius Antias and Aelius Tubero, lists Sulpicius together with Marcus Manlius, as the consuls of 434 BC. This Livy writes next to a secondary and contradictory tradition based on the writings of Licinius Macer, which places Gaius Julius and Proculus Verginius as being re-elected as consuls after having held the consulship the previous year. Diodorus Siculus provides a third narrative which includes both Manlius and Sulpicius together with a third individual, Servius Cornelius Cossus, but as consular tribunes, not consuls. Modern consensus generally favor either of traditions including Manlius and Sulpicius, with the classicist Broughton commenting that the re-election of the consuls of 435 remains the least likely version.

In either case, the actions of the consuls or consular tribunes of 434 BC is not well documented and they relinquished their imperium in favor of the appointment of a dictator. The dictator, Mamercus Aemilius Mamercinus, fought the Falerii and Etruria and enacted a law limiting the term of the censorship to one and a half year, down from the previous five years.

Sulpicius was appointed as one of the legates under the dictator Aulus Postumius Tubertus in 431 BC. They successfully fought the Aequi and Volsci and defeated them at Mount Algidus. The dictator, Tubertus, had previously been the magister equitum in 434 BC under Aemilius.

Political offices
Preceded by Gaius Julius; Proculus Verginius as consuls	Roman consular tribune 434 BC with Marcus Manlius and Servius Cornelius Cossus	Succeeded by Marcus Fabius; Marcus Folius; Lucius Sergius
