= Manius Papirius Crassus =

Consul of the Roman republic in 441 BC

Manius Papirius Crassus was consul of the Roman Republic in 441 BC.

Papirius belonged to the patrician Papiria gens. He was probably a brother or close relative to Lucius Papirius Crassus, consul in 436 BC, and Gaius Papirius Crassus, consul in 430 BC. Livy has his praenomen as Marcus instead of Manius.

== Career ==
If Papirius had the praenomen Marcus as Livy suggests, it is possible that he is the same individual as the Pontifex maximus who, as Asconius Pedianus writes, presided over the election of the Tribunes of the Plebs in 449 BC.

Papirius was elected consul together with Gaius Furius Pacilus Fusus in 441 BC. Close to nothing is known of this consulship.

== See also ==
- Papiria gens – Ancient Roman family

Political offices
Preceded by Marcus Fabius Vibulanus (consul 442 BC); Postumus Aebutius Helva Cornicen	Consul of the Roman Republic with Gaius Furius Pacilus Fusus; 441 BC	Succeeded by Proculus Geganius Macerinus; Lucius Menenius Lanatus (consul 440 BC) or Titus Menenius Lanatus (consul 452 BC)
