= Hostus Lucretius Tricipitinus =

Roman consul in 429 BC

Hostus Lucretius Tricipitinus was a consul of the Roman Republic in 429 BC.

Lucretius belonged to the ancient patrician Lucretia gens whose ancestors had been among the first consuls of the Republic. Lucretius was (presumably) the son of Lucius Lucretius Tricipitinus, consul in 462 BC, and the father of Publius Lucretius Tricipitinus, consular tribune in 419 BC.

Diodorus Siculus has his praenomen as Opiter, while both Livy and Cassiodorus has him named Hostus.

== Career ==
Lucretius was elected consul in 429 BC together with Lucius Sergius Fidenas. This was the second consulship of Sergius and third time he held the imperium. The two classical scholars R. S. Conway and C. F. Walters proposed that the events described by Livy for the year 428 BC should be ascribed to 429 BC. The events described by Livy include raids by the Veientane on Roman territory, the appointment of a commission to investigate the participation of Fidenae in these raids, and a severe drought. The commission sent consisted of the consul, Sergius, and two former dictators, Quintus Servilius Priscus Structus Fidenas and Mamercus Aemilius Mamercinus. Lucretius's role in the events remain obscure and other ancient writers do not comment on the actions of the consuls of 429 BC.

== See also ==
- Lucretia gens – Ancient Roman family

Political offices
Preceded by Lucius Papirius Crassus, Lucius Julius Iullus	Roman consul of the Roman Republic; 429 BC with Lucius Sergius Fidenas	Succeeded by Titus Quinctius Poenus Cincinnatus, Aulus Cornelius Cossus
