= Spurius Nautius Rutilus (consular tribune 424 BC) =

5th-century BC Roman patrician and consular tribune

Spurius Nautius Rutilus was a consular tribune of the Roman Republic in 424 BC.

Nautius belonged to the patrician Nautia gens. Filiations indicate that he was the son, or more likely the grandson of Spurius Nautius Rutilus, the consul of 488 BC. Nautius himself seems to be the father of Spurius Nautius Rutilus, consular tribune in 419, 416 and 404 BC, and Gaius Nautius Rutilus, consul in 411 BC.

== Consular tribune ==
In 424 BC Nautius was elected as consular tribune together with Appius Claudius Crassus, Lucius Sergius Fidenas and Sextus Julius Iullus. Nautius seems to have spent most of his consular time outside of Rome, probably leading armies in the field, as Livy mentions that only his colleague Claudius remained in Rome for the comitia and the election of the consular college of 423 BC. Nautius is not mentioned after 424 BC but both his sons, Spurius and Gaius, became successful politicians, achieving consular powers in 419 and 411 BC respectively.

Livy in reporting the consular college of 424 BC has Nautius named Naevius, a plebeian gens, but soon after confirms that all the consular tribunes of 424 were patricians and in a later chapter has him named Nautius. As other sources, such as Diodorus Siculus, also has him named Nautius, it is most likely that the Naevius mentioned by Livy is a mistake on the part of the ancient historian or later transcribers.

== See also ==
- Nautia gens

Political offices
Preceded by Aulus Sempronius Atratinus; Lucius Quinctius Cincinnatus II; Lucius Furius Medullinus II; Lucius Horatius Barbatus as Consular Tribunes	Consular tribune of the Roman Republic with Appius Claudius Crassus; Lucius Sergius Fidenas; Sextus Julius Iullus; 424 BC	Succeeded by Gaius Sempronius Atratinus; Quintus Fabius Vibulanus as Consuls
