= Gaius Papirius Crassus =

Roman senator, consul in 430 BC

Gaius Papirius Crassus (fl. c. 430 BC) was a Roman senator who held the executive state office of consul in 430 BC, as the colleague of Lucius Julius. During their year in office, an eight year long truce may have been signed with the Aequi, but this is uncertain. The consuls also enacted a law which allowed for the payment of fines in cash instead of livestock, in response to some heavy fines levied by the censors, Lucius Papirius and Publius Pinarius. Although the initiative for this law had come from the plebeian tribunes, the consuls preempted them by introducing the measure themselves.

The ancient sources disagree on the first name of Papirius Crassus. Livy (4.30.1), followed by Cassiodorus, names him Lucius Papirius, while Diodorus (12.72.1) calls him Gaius and Cicero (De re publica 2.60), Publius. The consul of 430 BC is not given an iteration number anywhere, which speaks against identifying him with Lucius Papirius Crassus, the consul of 436 BC. It is likely that the sources have confused the names of the consuls with those of the censors in 430 BC, Lucius Papirius and Publius Pinarius. The consul of 436 BC, Lucius Papirius Crassus, might then be identical with the censor and not the consul of 430 BC, especially since Lucius Papirius Mugillanus, the other candidate for the position, was censor later, in 418 BC. This leaves Diodorus's Gaius Papirius as the most likely identification with the consul of 430 BC. This is accepted by Frier.

Political offices
Preceded by Titus Quinctius Poenus Cincinnatus; Gaius Julius Mento	Roman consul with Lucius Julius Iullus; 430 BC	Succeeded by Lucius Sergius Fidenas II; Hostus Lucretius Tricipitinus
