= Lucius Sergius Fidenas =

5th-century BC Roman consul and military tribune

Lucius Sergius Fidenas was a Roman politician during the 5th century BC, and was elected consul in 437 and 429 BC. In 433, 424, and 418 BC he was military tribune with consular power.

== Family ==
He was a member of the Sergii Fidenates, a branch of the gens Sergia. His complete name was Lucius Sergius C.f. C.n. Fidenas.

== Career ==
In 437 BC, Sergius was elected consul with Marcus Geganius Macerinus. The year before, Fidenae had revolted against Rome and joined Lars Tolumnius, king of the Veientians. Roman ambassadors Gaius Fulcinius, Tullus Cloelius, Spurius Antius, and Lucius Roscius were sent to Fidenae, and were put to death by order of king Tolumnius. Statues of the ambassadors were set up in the rostra at the public's expense. This began the second war between Rome and Veii, which marked the first time that Rome defeated the army of king Tolumnius on their side of the river Anio, but with heavy losses. For his accomplishments in the war, Sergius earned the cognomen Fidenas.

In 433 BC, Sergius was elected military tribune with consular power alongside Marcus Fabius Vibulanus and Marcus Folius Flaccinator. That year saw a pestilence. According to Diodorus Siculus, Athens was affected harshly by that plague which he says killed over 10,000 people there. A temple was vowed to Apollo, which was completed two years later and dedicated to Apollo Medicus.

Sergius was elected consul again in 429 BC, with Hostus Lucretius Tricipitinus. During their term, Roman territory was raided by the Veientians. In 428 BC, Sergius was selected by the senate, with Quintus Servilius Priscus Fidenas and Mamercus Aemilius Mamercinus to investigate Fidenae and remove some of its people to Ostia.

Again in 424 BC, Sergius was elected military tribune with consular power, with Appius Claudius Crassus, Spurius Nautius Rutilus, and Sextus Julius Iullus. Grand games were organised to celebrate Rome's victory over Veii and Fidenae. Appius Claudius was left in charge of the city and held elections for the next consulship.

In 418, Sergius was elected military tribune with consular power for the third time, with Gaius Servilius Axilla and Marcus Papirius Mugillanus. A new enemy, the Labiciani, had allied themselves with the Aequi and they had pillaged the fields of Tusculum in the previous year. Upon coming to power, the military tribunes declared war and raised a levy. Sergius took command against the Aequi and fought a battle near their camp on disadvantageous ground, during which he lost his life. In response to his death, Quintus Servilius Priscus Fidenas was made dictator by the senate.

== Sources ==
=== Ancient ===
- Titus Livius in Roman History book 4.
- Diodorus Siculus in Bibliotheca Historica books 12 and 13.

=== Modern ===
- Broughton, Thomas Robert Shannon (1951), The Magistrates of the Roman Republic, Philological Monograph No. 15, New York: American Philological Association, ISBN 0-89130-811-3
- Coarelli, Filippo (2007), Rome and Environs : an Archaeological Guide, University of California Press, ISBN 978-0-520-07961-8

Political offices
Preceded by Mamercus Aemilius Mamercinus, Lucius Julius Iullus, and Lucius Quinctius Cincinnatus as Military Tribunes with Consular power	Consul of the Roman Republic; 437 BC with Marcus Geganius Macerinus	Succeeded by Lucius Papirius Crassus and Marcus Cornelius Maluginensis
Preceded by Servius Cornelius Cossus; Marcus Manlius Capitolinus; Quintus Sulpicius Camerinus Praetextatus	Consular Tribune of the Roman Republic; 433 BC with Marcus Fabius Vibulanus and Marcus Foslius Flaccinator	Succeeded by Lucius Pinarius Mamercinus, Spurius Postumius Albus Regillensis, and Lucius Furius Medullinus
Preceded by Lucius Julius Iullus, and Gaius Papirius Crassus	Consul of the Roman Republic; 429 BC with Hostus Lucretius Tricipitinus	Succeeded by Titus Quinctius Poenus Cincinnatus II and Aulus Cornelius Cossus
Preceded by Lucius Furius Medullinus II, Aulus Sempronius Atratinus, Lucius Quinctius Cincinnatus II, and Lucius Horatius Barbatus	Consular Tribune of the Roman Republic; 424 BC with Appius Claudius Crassus, Spurius Nautius Rutilus, and Sextus Julius Iullus	Succeeded by Gaius Sempronius Atratinus and Quintus Fabius Vibulanus as Consul of the Roman Republic
Preceded by Agrippa Menenius Lanatus, Spurius Nautius Rutilus, Publius Lucretius Tricipitinus, and Gaius Servilius Axilla	Consular Tribune of the Roman Republic; 418 BC with Gaius Servilius Axilla and Marcus Papirius	Succeeded by Publius Lucretius Tricipitinus II, Agrippa Menenius Lanatus II, and Spurius Veturius Crassus
