= Gaius Julius Iullus (consul 447 BC) =

Roman statesman, consul in 447 and 435 BC

- Office: Consul (447, 435 BC)

Gaius Julius Iullus was consul in 447 BC, and again in 435.

== Family ==
Julius was the son of the Gaius Julius Iullus who had been consul in 482 BC, and a member of the first decemvirate in 451. He was probably the grandson of the Gaius Julius Iulus who held the consulship in 489. Julius' uncle, Vopiscus Julius Iullus, was consul in 473. Some of the Julii Iulli who followed Gaius in the chief magistracies over the next several decades may have been his descendants, but the only ones who attained the consulship and whose filiations are known were his uncle's son and grandson.

== Career ==
Consul for the first time in BC 447, Julius and his colleague, Marcus Geganius Macerinus, inherited a state still rife with tension between the aristocratic party in the Roman Senate, and the people, whose chief defenders were the tribunes of the plebs. The consuls were directed to recruit soldiers to fight the Aequi and the Volsci, an action that was certain to inflame the populace; but as no threat appeared imminent, they suspended the order, reasoning that unrest in the city would only encourage Rome's enemies. Despite their measures to keep the peace, the consuls were unable to prevent the more extreme elements of the aristocratic faction from banding together to harass and intimidate the tribunes, until in fear of their very lives they became utterly ineffectual.

In Julius' second consulship, BC 435, Rome was in the midst of an epidemic that had started the previous year. Ordinary plans to raise an army against rival cities had to be abandoned, giving an opening to the men of Fidenae. Aided by the Veientes, the Fidenates took the field and advanced deep into Roman territory, according to Livy advancing almost within sight of the Colline Gate. Julius took what soldiers he could and manned the city walls, while his colleague, Proculus Verginius Tricostus, convened the senate in the temple of Quirinus, and then nominated Quintus Servilius Priscus as dictator.

Servilius and his magister equitum, Postumus Aebutius Elva, called a muster of all able-bodied men outside the Colline Gate, and immediately took the field. Alarmed by the Roman activity, the Fidenates and their allies retreated, and were harried by the dictator's army until they took refuge within the walls of Fidenae. Lacking the resources to maintain a long siege, Servilius entrenched his men and gave the impression of a siege, while sappers dug a passage under the city wall and into the citadel, which Servilius then captured, earning for himself the surname Fidenas.

Julius and Verginius served out the remainder of their term uneventfully. The only other event of note was the holding of a census in the Campus Martius for the first time; one of the censors was Marcus Geganius Macerinus, who had been consul with Julius twelve years earlier.

The historian Licinius Macer reported that Julius and Verginius were elected consuls again for the following year; but Valerius Antias and Aelius Tubero gave the consuls as Marcus Manlius Capitolinus and Quintus Sulpicius Camerinus Praetextatus, while Macer and Tubero each mentioned alternative traditions by which Manlius and Sulpicius were consular tribunes, together with Servius Cornelius Cossus. Diodorus agrees with the latter account.

== See also ==
- Julia gens

== Bibliography ==
- Titus Livius (Livy), Ab Urbe Condita (History of Rome).
- Diodorus Siculus, Bibliotheca Historica (Library of History).
- "Julus" (no. 4) in the Dictionary of Greek and Roman Biography and Mythology, William Smith, ed., Little, Brown and Company, Boston (1849).
- T. Robert S. Broughton, The Magistrates of the Roman Republic, American Philological Association (1952).

Preceded by Lars Herminius Aquilinus; T. Verginius Tricostus Caeliomontanus	Roman consul 447 BC; With: Marcus Geganius Macerinus	Succeeded by T. Quinctius Capitolinus Barbatus; Agrippa Furius Fusus
Preceded by Lucius Papirius Crassus; Marcus Cornelius Maluginensis	Roman consul 435 BC; With: Verginius Tricostus	Succeeded by M. Manlius Capitolinus Vulso; Q. Sulpicius Camerinus Praetextatus
