= Gaius Furius Pacilus Fusus =

5th-century BC Roman statesman and consul

Gaius Furius Pacilus Fusus was a Roman statesman of the early Republic. He was a descendant of the ancient patrician house of the Furii, which filled the highest offices of the Roman state from the early decades of the Republic to the first century AD. He was probably closely related to Quintus Furius Pacilus Fusus, whom Livy mentions as Pontifex Maximus in 449 BC, and was likely the father of Gaius Furius Pacilus, consul in 412 BC.

Furius is first mentioned in 441 BC, when he was consul with Manius Papirius Crassus; their year of office was uneventful. In 435, Furius was censor alongside Marcus Geganius Macerinus, who had been consul in 447, 443, and 437. The two colleagues approved the construction of the Villa Publica in the Campus Martius, using the new building to conduct the census; based on a passage in Livy apparently indicating that the "first" census was held in the year of its construction, Mommsen regards the censorship of Furius and Geganius to be the first "authentic" example of that magistracy, although multiple sources, including Livy, name Lucius Papirius Mugillanus and Lucius Sempronius Atratinus as the first censors, appointed in 443 BC.

Furius was one of four consular tribunes elected in place of consuls in 426. His colleagues were Titus Quinctius Poenus Cincinnatus, Marcus Postumius Albinus Regillensis, and Aulus Cornelius Cossus. Furius was defeated in a battle against Veii, leading to the appointment of Mamercus Aemilius Mamercinus as dictator to conduct the war. Furius' colleagues Quinctius and Postumius served under the dictator, while Cossus was named magister equitum. The dictator defeated Veii and captured Fidenae, for which he was awarded a triumph.

== Bibliography ==
- Diodorus Siculus, Bibliotheca Historica (Library of History).
- Titus Livius (Livy), History of Rome.
- Flavius Magnus Aurelius Cassiodorus, Chronica.
- Fasti Hydatiani.
- Chronicon Paschale (Fasti Siculi).
- Dictionary of Greek and Roman Biography and Mythology, William Smith, ed., Little, Brown and Company, Boston (1849).
- Theodor Mommsen, Römisches Staatsrecht (Roman Constitutional Law), S. Hirzel, Leipzig (1871–1876).
- August Pauly, Georg Wissowa, et al., Realencyclopädie der Classischen Altertumswissenschaft (Scientific Encyclopedia of the Knowledge of Classical Antiquities, abbreviated PW), J. B. Metzler, Stuttgart (1894–1980).
- Attilio Degrassi, "Fasti Consulares et Triumphales" ("Consular and Triumphal Fasti"), in Inscriptiones Italiae, vol. XIII, pp. 1 ff., Rome (1947).
- T. Robert S. Broughton, The Magistrates of the Roman Republic, American Philological Association (1952–1986).

Political offices
Preceded by Marcus Fabius Vibulanus; Postumus Aebutius Helva Cornicen	Consul of the Roman Republic with Manius Papirius Crassus; 441 BC	Succeeded by Proculus Geganius Macerinus; Menenius Lanatus
