= Lucius Papirius Crassus =

Lucius Papirius Crassus may refer to:

- Lucius Papirius Crassus (consul 436 BC)
- Lucius Papirius Crassus (consul 336 BC)
