= Lucius Pinarius Mamercinus =

Roman consular tribune in 432 BC

Lucius Pinarius Mamercinus was a consular tribune of the Roman Republic in 432 BC.

== Background ==
Pinarius belonged to the ancient patrician Pinaria gens which would fall into obscurity in the middle of the 4th century BC. Pinarius was the son of Lucius Pinarius Mamercinus Rufus, consul in 472 BC and grandson of Publius Pinarius Mamercinus Rufus, consul in 489 BC. He might have had a brother named Publius Pinarius, censor in 430 BC. Pinarius was the last known member of the Pinarii Mamercini and it is unknown of his relationship to later Pinarii, such as Lucius Pinarius Natta, praetor in 349 BC.

== Career ==
Pinarius was elected consular tribune in 432 BC together with Lucius Furius Medullinus and Spurius Postumius Albus Regillensis. While previous years and the following year contained several important events and wars with the Aequi, Volsci, Falerii and Etruria, Livy and other ancient authors mentions nothing of the events in 432 BC and of the actions of the consular tribunes.

Pinarius, or possibly an otherwise unattested brother named Publius, was elected as censor in 430 BC together with a Lucius Pinarius (probably Lucius Papirius Crassus, consul in 436 BC). The censors levied heavy fines which resulted in the enactment of new laws which allowed for the payment of fines with coin instead of livestock.

== See also ==
- List of Roman consuls

Political offices
Preceded by Marcus Fabius Vibulanus, Lucius Sergius Fidenas, Marcus Foslius Flaccinator as Consular tribunes	Consular tribune of the Roman Republic; 432 BC with Spurius Postumius Albus Regillensis, Lucius Furius Medullinus	Succeeded by Titus Quinctius Pennus Cincinnatus, Gaius Julius Mento as Consuls
