= Vopiscus Julius Iullus =

Roman senator, consul in 473 BC

- Office: Consul (473 BC)
- Children: Lucius and Spurius

Vopiscus Julius Iullus (Note: The original spelling of his surname was Iullus, which is supported by the whole body of literary tradition and is used by all modern sources. Vergil in his Aeneid later popularized the spelling Iulus, with a single 'l', which was adopted by the Fasti Capitolini.) (fl. c. 473 BC) was a Roman statesman, who held the consulship in 473 BC, a year in which the authority of the Roman magistrates was threatened after the murder of a tribune of the plebs. (Note: Livy reports an alternative tradition, in which the consul was not Vopiscus Julius, but Opiter Verginius.)

== Family ==
Vopiscus was the son of Gaius and grandson of Lucius. His father is usually supposed to be the same Gaius Julius Iullus who had been consul in 489 BC. He was the brother of Gaius Julius, the consul of 482. He had at least two sons: Lucius, who was magister equitum to the dictator Aulus Postumius Tubertus in 431, and held the consulship in the following year; and Spurius, who seems not to have held any magistracies, but who was the father of Gaius Julius, consular tribune in 408 and 405, and Lucius Julius, consular tribune in 403. Sextus Julius Iulus, who was consular tribune in 424, may have been a younger son of Vopiscus, or perhaps the son of his nephew, Gaius, who was consul in 447.

== Career ==
The year before Vopiscus' election, the consuls Lucius Furius Medullinus Fusus and Gnaeus Manlius Vulso, had blocked all attempts at agrarian reform, and no sooner had they left office than they were summoned to account for their conduct by the tribune Gnaeus Genucius. He had previously brought to trial Titus Menenius Lanatus, whose failure to intervene in the Battle of the Cremera during his consulship in 477 had led to the utter destruction of the Fabii and the loss of an important strategic position, and Spurius Servilius Structus, who as consul in 476 recklessly attacked a Veientine force that had taken the Janiculum, and only been rescued from disaster by the arrival of his colleague. Menenius had escaped with a fine and his life, but soon sickened and died; while Servilius was acquitted due to the boldness of his defense, and the support of his colleague, Aulus Verginius Tricostus Rutilus.

As Vopiscus and his colleague, Lucius Aemilius Mamercus, who had previously been consul in 484 and 478, took office, their predecessors dressed in mourning, and bewailed their fate as they walked through the streets, claiming that to be elected to high office was to be doomed to destruction by the tyranny of the plebeian tribunes. But on the morning of the trial, Genucius was found murdered in his house. The remaining tribunes were cowed, and the ex-consuls escaped prosecution. But flush with their apparent victory, the senate called for a levy of troops, which the consuls immediately undertook.

When a former centurion by the name of Volero Publilius refused to be conscripted as an ordinary soldier, the consuls ordered a lictor to arrest him. Brought before the consuls in the forum, he appealed to the tribunes of the plebs, who were too fearful to intervene. But before he could be scourged, Publilius broke free of the lictors with the help of the crowd, whose support he elicited, and whose sympathy he was able to arouse. Vopiscus and his colleague, protected only by their twenty-four lictors, all of them plebeians, and some of them already being manhandled by the people, were forced from the forum and took refuge in the senate-house until the anger of the crowd died down. Although the more aristocratic senators urged harsh tactics for dealing with the situation, calmer heads seeking to avoid further strife between the orders prevailed, and an uneasy truce saw out the year.

As Aemilius and Vopiscus prepared to depart the consulship, Publilius was elected tribune for the following year, and the year after. In 471 BC, he carried a law allowing the concilium plebis to assemble by tribe, rather than by wards, and granting them the power to elect their own tribunes, giving the plebeians a new measure of political independence.

Friedrich Münzer considers the account of the political turmoil during Vopiscus's consulship to be unhistorical.

== See also ==
- Julia gens

== Bibliography ==
- Titus Livius (Livy), Ab Urbe Condita (History of Rome).
- Dionysius of Halicarnassus, Romaike Archaiologia.
- Diodorus Siculus, Bibliotheca Historica (Library of History).
- Aulus Gellius, Noctes Atticae (Attic Nights).
- "Vopiscus Julius C. f. L. n. Iulus" (no. 3) in the Dictionary of Greek and Roman Biography and Mythology, William Smith, ed., Little, Brown and Company, Boston (1849).
- T. Robert S. Broughton, The Magistrates of the Roman Republic, American Philological Association (1952).

Political offices
Preceded by Lucius Furius Medullinus; Aulus Manlius Vulso	Roman consul 473 BC with Lucius Aemilius Mamercus III	Succeeded by Lucius Pinarius Mamercinus Rufus; Publius Furius Medullinus Fusus
