= Gaius Sempronius Atratinus =

5th-century BC Roman consul

Gaius Sempronius Atratinus was a consul of the Roman Republic in 423 BC.

Sempronius belonged to the patrician Sempronia gens and the branch known as the Sempronii Atratini, one of the republic's oldest consular families, having reached the consulship in 497 BC. He is the first known Gaius among the Sempronia, but the praenomen would become increasingly common within the gens during the 3rd and 2nd century BC. As no filiations have survived it remains unclear how Sempronius was connected with the other contemporary Sempronia during this period, but it is likely that Aulus Sempronius Atratinus, consular tribune in 444 BC was his father. This would make Aulus Sempronius Atratinus, consular tribune in 425 BC his cousin. Aulus Sempronius Atratinus, magister equitum in 380 BC, is most likely a son of either Sempronius or his cousin, the consular tribune of 425 BC.

== Consulship and Trial ==
In 423 BC Sempronius was elected as consul together with Quintus Fabius Vibulanus. Sempronius fought against the Volscians during the consulship and failed in this endeavour to such an extent that he was placed on trial the following year for "endangering his army". The trial came after the tribune of the plebs, Gaius Junius, started the prosecution in 423 BC, before the case went to trial in 422 BC. The prosecution was handed over to Junius' successor in the tribuneship, Lucius Hortenius, while the defence was led by Sextus Tempanius, a former cavalry decurio under Sempronius, who had been elected plebeian tribune for the sole reason of defending Sempronius. The defence seems to have been a partial success as no conviction was made during the year or the following. Eventually, in 420 BC, through the combined effort of three plebeian tribunes, Aulus Antistius, Sextus Pompilius and Marcus Canuleius, the former consul was convicted and forced to pay heavy fines. This late conviction was primarily as retaliation for the actions of Sempronius' cousin, Aulus Sempronius Atratinus, whose conduct as consular tribune during the election of the Quaestors that year had angered the plebeian tribunes. Sempronius trial and eventual conviction seems to have severely affected his career as he does not appear in sources after this, while both his cousin, Aulus Sempronius, and his former consular colleague, Quintus Fabius, went on to have lucrative careers that involved holding the imperium on a number of occasions.

== See also ==
- Sempronia gens – Ancient Roman family

Political offices
Preceded by Appius Claudius Crassus; Lucius Sergius Fidenas II; Spurius Nautius Rutilus; Sextus Julius Iullus as Consular tribunes	Consul of the Roman Republic; 423 BC with Quintus Fabius Vibulanus	Succeeded by Lucius Manlius Capitolinus; Quintus Antonius Merenda; Lucius Papirius Mugillanus as Consular tribunes
