= Gyas =

Trojan sailor in Virgil's Aeneid

Gyas, a character in Virgil's Aeneid, features most extensively as one of the captains in the boat race in Book 5. He also appears (briefly) in Books 1 and 12. He was claimed as the eponymous ancestor of the Gegania gens, a patrician family of the Roman Republic.

== Occurrences ==
=== Book 1 ===
Gyas is introduced to the reader after Aeneas has landed on the coast of Libya, after the storm dispersed and, he fears, wrecked his fleet. "Intrepid Gyas" is one of the captains whose presumed death he mourns (Aeneid 1.222).

=== Book 5 ===
Gyas is one of the four captains in the boat race in Book 5 of the Aeneid; he commands the Chimaera, and after gaining an early lead, at the halfway point he orders Menoetes, his helmsman, to steer in tightly, but Menoetes, afraid of hitting the reef, takes a wider turn and the Chimaera is passed on the inside by Cloanthus in the Scylla. In anger, Gyas throws Menoetes overboard, to the amusement of the spectators.

Gyas flew out to see first, slipping by others
in all the noise and confusion.
...
...Reaching the marker,
the leading captain, Gyas, seawater swirling
around him, called to the ship's helmsman, Menoetes:
"Why so far to starboard? Alter your course there,
hug that rock....
...
...he grabbed a fretful Menoetes,
forgot good grace and the safety of crewmen,
and threw him headlong down from the high stern in the water. (Aeneid 5.151-152; 159-63; 173-175.)

==== Commentary ====
Gyas, through his "extraordinary" and "ill-considered" action, forces himself to take up two roles: captain and helmsman. In doing so, he prefigures Aeneas, who will have to do the same thing at the end of Book 5, after Palinurus falls overboard and drowns. According to Joseph Farrell, the comparison favors Aeneas.

The swimming ability of "old man" Menoetes to swim to shore fully clothed, and without the assistance of a magical veil, contrasts with Odysseus's swim to shore and avoidance of the sort of rocks at Phaeacia that Menoetes clambered up onto unaided.

Gyas was considered the eponymous ancestor of the Gegania gens (the link was made by Maurus Servius Honoratus, a fifth-century grammarian and commentator of Virgil), but Virgil lists the other three captains (Mnestheus, Sergestus, Cloanthus) along with the families they supposedly founded (the Memmia gens, the Sergia gens, and the Cluentians, respectively), the Gegania, which would have been much less familiar to Virgil's audience than the other families, get no such credit, which John Conington found "singular". David Ross, professor of classics at the University of Michigan, also noted Gyas was not directly connected to a gens, and also characterized the description of the Chimaera as "decidedly odd", seeming to be "an aircraft carrier, racing against destroyers".

Joseph Addison wrote in issue 279 of The Spectator that "Sentiments which raise laughter can very seldom be admitted with any decency into an heroic poem [...] I remember but one laugh in the whole Aeneid, which rises in the fifth book upon Menoetes, where he is represented as thrown overboard, and drying himself upon a rock.". David Ross observed that it is, however, "the laughter of mockery and derision". Professor of Latin at University College London Malcolm M. Willcock concurred that it is "insensitive" and that "[t]o laugh at the unmerited misfortune of another human being is not the highest moral reaction", observing that Menoetes had done nothing deserving of such a reaction from spectators. Addison's recollection notwithstanding, a second instance of the same mocking laughter occurs when Sergestus brings his boat in.

=== Book 10, possibly ===
Through the word "clavus" meaning both tiller and club, the "huge" namesake in 10.317–322 who lays his foes low with a club that belongs to Hercules is linked by scholars to the ship's captain.

=== Book 12 ===
In Book 12.460, Gyas beheads Ufens (Aeneid 12.460).

== Later commentary and references ==
- Minor planet 5637 was discovered by C. S. Shoemaker and E. M. Shoemaker in 1988 and named for Gyas.
- Edwin Arlington Robinson's sonnet titled "Menoetes", first published in the Harvard Advocate of 1892-03-15, is based upon this incident: "Who is this fellow floundering in the wave / Flung from the Trojan galley thundering by?"
- Richard Anthony Salisbury chose Gyas as the name for a botanical genus, naming orchid species such as Gyas verecunda, Gyas florida, and Gyas humilis. However, this was superseded by Robert Brown's name Bletia.

== Bibliography ==
- Conington, John (1876). Commentary on Vergil's Aeneid. Vol. 1. London: Whittaker and Co.
- Drapiez, Pierre-Auguste-Joseph (1853). "Gyas". Les trois règnes de la nature: dictionnaire classique des sciences naturelles (in French). Vol. 5. Brussels: Meline, Cans et Ce, libraires-éditeurs.
- Farrell, Joseph (2021). Juno's Aeneid: A Battle for Heroic Identity. Martin Classical Lectures. Vol. 1. Princeton University Press. ISBN 9780691211176.
- Fratantuono, Lee M.; Smith, R. Alden (2015). Virgil, Aeneid 5: Text, Translation and Commentary; Mnemosyne, Supplements. Brill. ISBN 9789004301283.
- Gale, Robert L. (2006). "Meonoetes". An Edwin Arlington Robinson Encyclopedia. McFarland & Company. ISBN 9780786422371.
- Ganiban, Randall T., ed. (2013). Aeneid 1–6. The Focus Vergil Aeneid Commentaries. Hackett. ISBN 9781585106387.
- Haan, Estelle (2005). Vergilius Redivivus: Studies in Joseph Addison's Latin Poetry. Transactions of the American Philosophical Society. Vol. 95. American Philosophical Society. ISBN 9780871699527. ISSN 0065-9746.
- Harper, William Rainey; Miller, Frank Justus, eds. (1892). "Book V". Six books of the Aeneid of Vergil. American Book Company.
- Lowe, Dunstan (2015). Monsters and Monstrosity in Augustan Poetry. University of Michigan Press. ISBN 9780472119516.
- McManamon, John M. (2021). "Neither Letters nor Swimming": The Rebirth of Swimming and Free-diving. Brill's Studies in Maritime History. Brill. ISBN 9789004446199.
- Robinson, Edwin Arlington (1975). Cary, Richard (ed.). Uncollected Poems and Prose of Edwin Arlington Robinson. Colby College Press. ISBN 9780910394130.
- Ross, David O. (2008). "Virgil's Troy". Virgil's Aeneid: A Reader's Guide. John Wiley & Sons. ISBN 9780470777312.
- Salisbury, R. A. (1812-03-03). "On the cultivation of rare plants, especially such as have been introduced since the death of Mr Philip Miller". Transactions of the Horticultural Society of London. 1. Horticultural Society of London: 299–300.
- Schmadel, Lutz D. (2013). Dictionary of Minor Planet Names (3rd ed.). Springer Science + Business Media. doi:10.1007/978-3-540-29925-7_5342. ISBN 9783662066157.
- Virgil (1995). The Aeneid. Translated by McCrorie, Edward. University of Michigan Press. ISBN 9780472065950.
- Willcock, Malcolm M. (1988). "Homer's Chariot Race and Virgil's Boat Race". In Huxley, Herbert H. (ed.). Proceedings of the Virgil Society (PDF). Vol. 19.
