= Lucius Valerius Poplicola Potitus =

5th-century BC Roman senator and consul

- Office: Consul (449 BC)
- Children: Lucius Valerius Potitus

Lucius Valerius Poplicola Potitus (fl. c. 450–446 BC) was a patrician who, together with Marcus Horatius Barbatus, opposed the second decemvirate in 449 BC when that body showed despotic tendencies. In honor of their efforts, the pair were elected consuls for the remainder of that year.

== Potitus and the Decemvirate ==
The two men were patricians who stood up when a plebeian was being abused by the despotic second decemvirate, spoke critically of the decemviri and showed sympathy towards the plebeians. When the plebeians rebelled in the second plebeian secession they were chosen as negotiators because their previous actions had put them in a favourable light in the eyes of the plebeians, who felt that they were trustworthy. When the demands of the plebeians were met and the secession was called off, both men were elected as consuls. They passed the Valerio-Horatian Laws (Leges Veleriae-Horatiae). The first law established that the resolutions (plebiscites) of the Plebeian Council were binding on whole people, including the patricians. The second law restored the right of appeal to the people which had been suspended during the two decemvirates and added the provision that no official exempt from the right of appeal was to be appointed and in the case of such an appointment anyone could lawfully kill him. The third law put the principle of the inviolability (sacrosanctity) of the plebeian tribunes (the representatives of the plebeians) into the statutes. Previously, this principle was only enshrined in the religious sanction of the lex sacrata.

Both the story of the first and the second decemvirates have been questioned by some modern historians who think that the second decemvirate was a fiction. This would put into question the historicity of the second plebeian secession, the consulship of Lucius Valerius and his colleague and the Valerio-Horatian Laws. Mommsen and Cornell are among the historians who defend the historicity of at least the core of the story. The Valerio-Horatian Laws have also been questioned. Regarding the law on the right of appeal, there were two other such laws by consuls from the Valeria family (dated 509 BC and 300 BC) and the argument is that only the last one is historical. Regarding the law of the resolution of the Plebeian Council, there were two other laws with the same provision, the Lex Publilia of 339 BC and the Lex Hortensia of 287 BC. Again, it is argued that only the last law is historical. Other historians have defended the historicity of these laws.

== Quaestorship ==
Three years after his consulship, in 446 BC, Valerius was elected Quaestor together with Mamercus Aemilius Mamercinus. They were, according to Tacitus, the first elected quaestors of the Republic.

Political offices
Preceded by Decemviri	Roman consul 449 BC with Marcus Horatius Barbatus	Succeeded by Lars Herminius; Titus Verginius
