= Nautia gens =

The gens Nautia was an old patrician family at ancient Rome. The first of the gens to obtain the consulship was Spurius Nautius Rutilus in 488 BC, and from then until the Samnite Wars the Nautii regularly filled the highest offices of the Roman Republic. After that time, the Nautii all but disappear from the record, appearing only in a handful of inscriptions, mostly from Rome and Latium. A few Nautii occur in imperial times, including a number who appear to have been freedmen, and in the provinces.

== Origin ==
Little is known about the origin of the nomen Nautius, or whether it has any connection with nauta, a sailor. The Nautii themselves claimed to be descended from Nautes or Nautius, a companion of Aeneas, who brought the Palladium, a sacred statue of Athena from Troy. His descendants, the Nautii, were said to have protected and maintained the Palladium into Roman times.

== Praenomina ==
All of the Nautii known from the early Republic bore the praenomina Spurius or Gaius. The later Nautii used Marcus, Gaius, Publius, Lucius, and Quintus, all of which were very common names throughout Roman history.

== Branches and cognomina ==
All of the Nautii mentioned in history bore the surname Rutilus, which means "reddish", and probably signified that one of the early Nautii had red hair.

== Members ==
This list includes abbreviated praenomina. For an explanation of this practice, see filiation.

=== Early Nautii ===
- Spurius Nautius Sp. f. (Sp. n.) Rutilus, a distinguished young patrician at the time of the first secession of the plebs, in 493 BC. During his consulship in 488, Coriolanus marched against Rome at the head of a Volscian army. Nautius and his colleague saw to the city's defenses while various envoys attempted to negotiate with Coriolanus.
- Gaius Nautius Sp. f. Sp. n. Rutilus, consul in 475 BC, had the conduct of the war against the Volsci. Unable to force a confrontation, he ravaged their territory. During his second consulship in 458, he fought successfully against the Sabines, but when his colleague was defeated by the Aequi, he was asked to nominate Roman dictator, and chose Cincinnatus.
- Spurius Nautius Sp. f. Rutilus, consular tribune in 424 BC.
- Spurius Nautius Sp. f. Sp. n. Rutilus, consular tribune in 419, 416, and 404 BC. (Note: Under 404 BC, Livy describes Rutilus as consular tribune for the second time, although he also described the two prior occasions.)
- Gaius Nautius Sp. f. Sp. n. Rutilus, (Note: Broughton notes that this Nautius is only named Gaius in Livy; in other sources he is Spurius, and Broughton identifies him with the consular tribune of 419, 416, and 404.) consul in 411 BC.
- Spurius Nautius Sp. f. Sp. n. Rutilus, consul in 316 BC.
- Spurius Nautius Rutilus, an officer serving under the consul Lucius Papirius Cursor in 293, was rewarded for his bravery against the Samnites at Aquilonia.
- Gaius Nautius Rutilus, consul in 287 BC.
- Nautius (Rutilus), a military tribune in 256 BC, during the First Punic War, opposed the plan of the consul Marcus Atilius Regulus the war to Africa, but Regulus threatened him with death if he did not obey his orders.

=== Later Nautii ===
- Gaius Nautius Q. f., a senator in 129 BC.
- Marcus Nautius, quaestor during the late Republic or the early decades of the Empire, according to an inscription at Gabii.
- Gaius Nautius Amphio, one of the curators of a monument erected at Rome in AD 9.
- Gaius Nautius Nicanor, mentioned in an inscription from Rome.
- Gaius Nautius Philoxenus, mentioned in an inscription from Rome.
- Publius Nautius Auctus, mentioned in an inscription from Rome.
- Gaius Nautius Syntropus, mentioned in an inscription from Cumae concerning those serving under the quindecimviri sacris faciundis, guardians of the Sibylline Books, which were said to have come from Cumae during the reign of Tarquin the Proud.
- Gaius Nautius C. l. Trupho, a freedman named in an inscription from Tarracina.
- Publius Nautius Apollinaris, erected a monument at Rome to Lucius Lusius Petellinus.
- Marcus Nautius, named in an inscription from Lilybaeum.
- Lucius Nautius, named in an inscription from Lilybaeum.
- Quintus Nautius Secundus, a soldier from Carthage in the second legion at Nicopolis in Epirus Vetus, according to an inscription dating to the middle of the second century.

== See also ==
- List of Roman gentes

== Bibliography ==
- Publius Vergilius Maro, Aeneid.
- Titus Livius (Livy), Ab Urbe Condita (History of Rome).
- Dionysius of Halicarnassus, Romaike Archaiologia.
- Lucius Annaeus Florus, Epitome de T. Livio Bellorum Omnium Annorum DCC (Epitome of Livy: All the Wars of Seven Hundred Years).
- Lucius Cassius Dio Cocceianus (Cassius Dio), Roman History.
- Maurus Servius Honoratus, Ad Virgilii Aeneidem Commentarii (Commentary on Vergil's Aeneid).
- Dictionary of Greek and Roman Biography and Mythology, William Smith, ed., Little, Brown and Company, Boston (1849).
- Theodor Mommsen et alii, Corpus Inscriptionum Latinarum (The Body of Latin Inscriptions, abbreviated CIL), Berlin-Brandenburgische Akademie der Wissenschaften (1853–present).
- René Cagnat et alii, L'Année épigraphique (The Year in Epigraphy, abbreviated AE), Presses Universitaires de France (1888–present).
- George Davis Chase, "The Origin of Roman Praenomina", in Harvard Studies in Classical Philology, vol. VIII (1897).
- T. Robert S. Broughton, The Magistrates of the Roman Republic, American Philological Association (1952).
- Robert K. Sherk, "The Text of the Senatus Consultum De Agro Pergameno", in Greek, Roman, and Byzantine Studies, vol. 7, pp. 361–369 (1966).
