= Maxima auspicia =

Concept in ancient Roman law

In ancient Roman religion and law, the auspicia maxima (also maxima auspicia) were the "greatest auspices," conferred on senior magistrates who held imperium: "auspicium and imperium were the twin pillars of the magistrate's power" (potestas). Only magistrates who had auspicia maxima were entitled to begin a war and, if victorious, to celebrate a triumph. The auspicia maxima were reserved primarily for consuls and censors, but these were two different types of auspices. Consuls and censors were not colleagues, and the censors lacked military auspices (auspicia militiae). Praetors, however, held a form of auspicia maxima and could also lead an army, though their imperium was lesser than that of the consuls.
