= Lars Herminius Aquilinus =

5th-century BC Roman politician and consul

Lars Herminius Aquilinus was consul in 448 BC with Titus Verginius Tricostus Caeliomontanus (consul 448). Their year of office was relatively peaceful, as neither consul took sides in the conflict between the patricians and the plebeians.

Lars' filiation, "T. f.", indicates that his father was named Titus. He may have been the son, or perhaps the grandson, of Titus Herminius, one of the heroes of the Republic, who was famous for his stand at the Sublician bridge in 508 BC, and who fell in the Battle of Lake Regillus.

The consul's praenomen is given differently by various authorities. The historian Livius calls him Spurius, while Cassiodorus calls him Lucius. Diodorus Siculus gives "Λαρινος", and Dionysius "Λαρος". These agree with the treatise, De Praenominibus, of uncertain authorship (usually appended to Valerius Maximus), which, however, gives the unusual spelling Lar. Lars is a common Etruscan praenomen, apparently meaning lord. Lars is the usual form of the name in Latin. Some sources give his cognomen as Coritinesanus.

== See also ==
- Herminia gens

== Footnotes ==
Political offices
Preceded by Lucius Valerius Potitus; Marcus Horatius Barbatus	Roman consul 448 BC with Titus Verginius Tricostus Caeliomontanus	Succeeded by Marcus Geganius Macerinus; Gaius Julius Iulus
