= Marcus Geganius Macerinus =

5th-century BC Roman statesman and consul

Consul of the Roman Republic
- In office 13 December 447 BC – 12 December 446 Serving with Gaius Julius Iulus (consul 447 BC)
- Preceded by: Lars Herminius Aquilinus, Titus Verginius Tricostus Caeliomontanus (consul 448)
- Succeeded by: Titus Quinctius Capitolinus Barbatus, Agrippa Furius Fusus
- In office 13 December 443 BC – 12 December 442 BC Serving with Titus Quinctius Capitolinus Barbatus
- Preceded by: Lucius Papirius Mugillanus, Lucius Sempronius Atratinus (consul 444 BC)
- Succeeded by: Marcus Fabius Vibulanus (consul 442 BC), Postumus Aebutius Elva Cornicen
- In office 13 December 437 BC – 12 December 436 BC Serving with Lucius Sergius Fidenas
- Preceded by: Mamercus Aemilius Mamercinus, Lucius Julius Iulus (consul 430 BC), Lucius Quinctius Cincinnatus
- Succeeded by: Lucius Papirius Crassus, Marcus Cornelius Maluginensis

Personal details
- Born: Unknown; Ancient Rome
- Died: Unknown; Ancient Rome

Marcus Geganius Macerinus was a Roman statesman who served as Consul in 447, 443, and 437 BC, and as Censor in 435 BC.

== Family ==
Geganius came from the rather small patrician Gegania gens, which had only once before risen to the consulship, this when Titus Geganius Macerinus held it in 492 BC. Geganius shares his praenomen with that of his father, an otherwise unattested Marcus Geganius who should probably be seen as a descendant of the consul of 492 or his brother, Lucius Geganius Macerinus. He had a (younger) brother, Proculus Geganius Macerinus, who became consul in 440 BC. His grandsons (or grandnephews), Lucius Geganius Macerinus and Marcus Geganius Macerinus, would become consular tribunes in 378 and 367 BC respectively.

== Career ==
Geganius was elected as consul in 447 BC together with Gaius Julius Iulus. According to Livy, he and his colleague concerned themselves with easing the tensions between the classes. They also carried out a war against the Volscians.

Geganius held the consulship for a second time in 443 BC, this time together with another repeated consular, Titus Quinctius Capitolinus Barbatus. Geganius relieved Ardea from Volscian attacks and made Cloelius, the Volscian commander, his prisoner. For this he was awarded and celebrated a triumph. A new magistrate was created during this year, that of the censorship, to free the consuls from the holding of the census and to focus on military affairs.

Geganius held a third and final consulship in 437 BC with first time consul Lucius Sergius Fidenas. Geganius fought the Veientes south of the Anio, and although he defeated his foe the victory came at heavy loss for the Romans. His co-consular Sergius gained his cognomen Fidenas for his victories against the Fidenae. Possibly because of the heavy losses against the Veientes or for reasons otherwise unknown, Geganius abdicated his consulship and was replaced by Marcus Valerius Lactuca Maximus. The year would see further changes within the Roman leadership as a dictator, Mamercus Aemilius Mamercinus, was appointed. Aemilius successfully fought the Veii, Falerii and Fidenae.

Geganius' last known major magistracy is that of censor in 435 BC together with Gaius Furius Pacilus Fusus. They approved the construction of the Villa Publica in the Campus Martius and when finished they completed the census there. A new law was approved during their censorship which limited the term to one and a half year, down from the previous term of five years. The classicist scholar Mommsen argues that with the erection and approval of the Villa Publica that Geganius and Furius should be considered the first historically authentic censors.

Geganius would later serve under the dictator Aulus Postumius Tubertus, fighting against the Aequi and Volsci at Mount Algidus in 431 BC; he might have served as a Legatus, but his exact title and role in the fighting is not known.

== See also ==
- Gegania (gens)

Political offices
Preceded by Lars Herminius Aquilinus and Titus Verginius Tricostus Caeliomontanus	Consul of the Roman Republic; 447 BC with Gaius Julius Iulus	Succeeded by Titus Quinctius Capitolinus Barbatus IV and Agrippa Furius Fusus
Preceded by Lucius Papirius Mugillanus and Lucius Sempronius Atratinus	Consul of the Roman Republic; 443 BC with Titus Quinctius Capitolinus Barbatus V	Succeeded by Marcus Fabius Vibulanus and Postumus Aebutius Helva Cornicen
Preceded by Mamercus Aemilius Mamercinus, Lucius Julius Iulus, and Lucius Quinctius Cincinnatus as Military Tribunes with Consular power	Consul of the Roman Republic; 437 BC with Lucius Sergius Fidenas	Succeeded by Lucius Papirius Crassus and Marcus Cornelius Maluginensis
