= Titus Verginius Tricostus Caeliomontanus (consul 448 BC) =

5th century BC Roman patrician, consul in 448 BC

Consul of the Roman Republic
- In office 13 December 448 BC – 12 December 447 BC Serving with Lars Herminius Aquilinus
- Preceded by: Lucius Valerius Potitus, Marcus Horatius Barbatus
- Succeeded by: Marcus Geganius Macerinus, Gaius Julius Iulus

Personal details
- Born: Unknown; Ancient Rome
- Died: Unknown; Ancient Rome

Titus Verginius Tricostus Caeliomontanus was consul of the Roman Republic in 448 BC with Lars Herminius Aquilinus. Little is known about his life.

== Family background ==
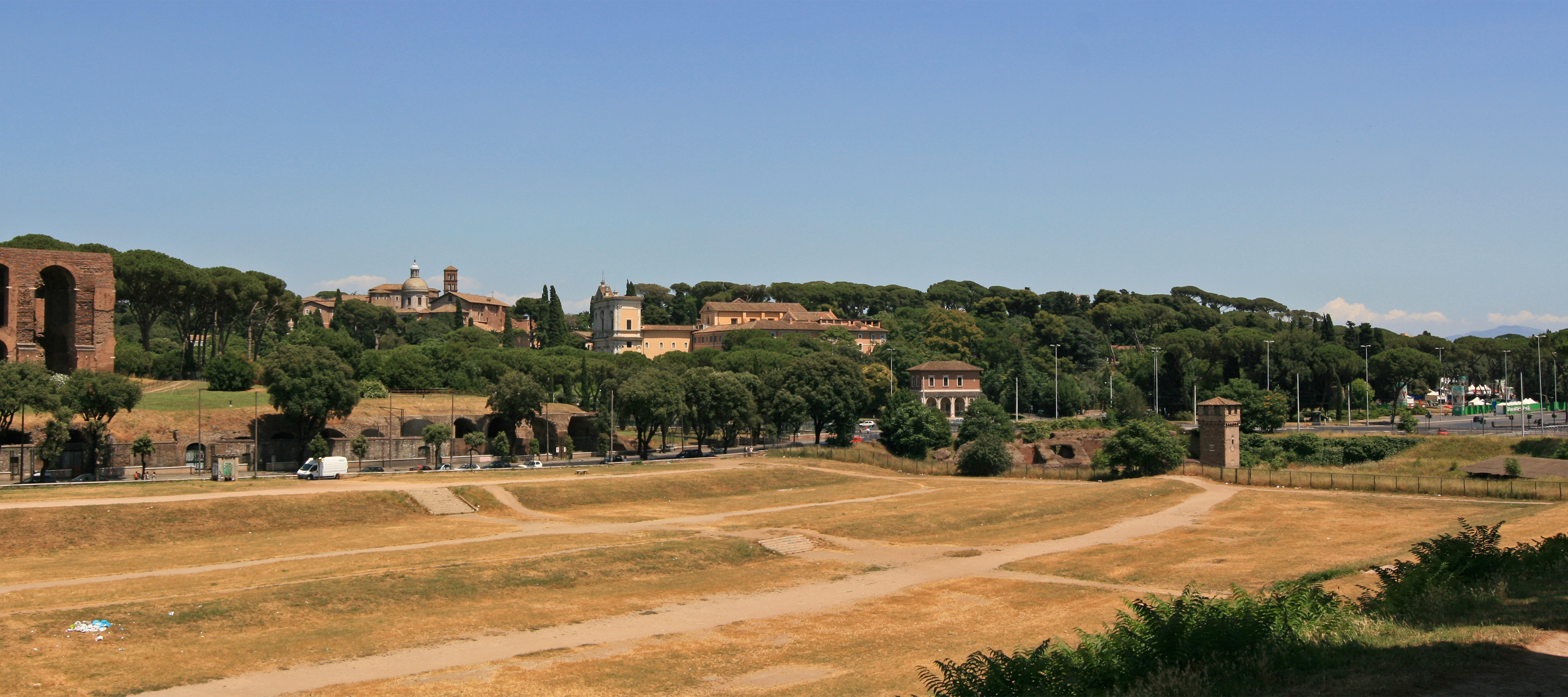
The Caelian Hill, which gave its name to Caeliomontanus.

Caeliomontanus belonged to the patrician gens Verginia, which was of Etruscan origin, arriving to Rome with the Tarquins. They originally only bore the cognomen Tricostus. The first member of the family to reach the consulship was Opiter Verginius Tricostus in 502, in the early years of the Roman Republic. The patrician Verginii soon separated in two branches, one living on the Esquiline Hill, the other on the Caelian Hill, thus taking the additional cognomen Esquilinus and Caeliomontanus.

The Fasti Capitolini are missing between 449 and 423, so Caeliomontanus' filiation has not been preserved. Friedrich Münzer and Hans Georg Gundel thought he was the son of Spurius Verginius Tricostus Caeliomontanus, consul in 456, but it is improbable that he was consul just 8 years before his son. Robert Maxwell Ogilvie suggested instead Aulus Verginius, consul in 469, as his father, with a more credible 21 years gap between them.

== Career ==
Caeliomontanus' career is completely unknown apart from his consulship. He was elected consul posterior in 448, with Lars Herminius Aquilinus as consul prior, which means the Centuriate Assembly elected Aquilinus before Caeliomontanus.

Their year of office was relatively peaceful, as neither consul took sides during the Conflict of the Orders, the social struggle that opposed patricians and plebeians during the first two centuries of the Republic. Livy adds that they did not wage any military campaign.

== Bibliography ==
=== Ancient sources ===
- Dionysius of Halicarnassus, Romaike Archaiologia (English translation on LacusCurtius).
- Livy, Ab Urbe Condita (English translation by Rev. Canon Roberts on Wikisource).

=== Modern sources ===
- T. Robert S. Broughton, The Magistrates of the Roman Republic, American Philological Association, 1951–1952.
- Attilio Degrassi, Fasti Capitolini recensuit, praefatus est, indicibus instruxit Atilius Degrassi, Turin, 1954.
- Robert Maxwell Ogilvie, Commentary on Livy, books 1–5, Oxford, Clarendon Press, 1965.
- August Pauly, Georg Wissowa, Friedrich Münzer, et alii, Realencyclopädie der Classischen Altertumswissenschaft (abbreviated PW), J. B. Metzler, Stuttgart, 1894–1980.
- Lily Ross Taylor and T. Robert S. Broughton, "The Order of the Two Consuls' Names in the Yearly Lists", Memoirs of the American Academy in Rome, 19 (1949), pp. 3–14.

Political offices
Preceded by Lucius Valerius Potitus, and Marcus Horatius Barbatus	Consul of the Roman Republic; 448 BC with Lars Herminius Aquilinus	Succeeded by Marcus Geganius Macerinus, and Gaius Julius Iulus
