= Ufens =

Character in Virgil's Aeneid

Ufens is a character in Virgil's The Aeneid as well as Silius' Punica. According to The Aeneid:

Next Ufens, mountain-bred, from Nersae came
to join the war; of goodly fame was he
for prosperous arms: his Aequian people show
no gentle mien, but scour the woods for prey,
or, ever-armed, across the stubborn glebe
compel the plough; though their chief pride and joy
are rapine, violence, and plundered store."

In The Aeneid 12.460, Gyas beheads Ufens.
