= Gegania gens =

Ancient Roman family

The gens Gegania was an old patrician family at ancient Rome, which was prominent from the earliest period of the Republic to the middle of the fourth century BC. The first of this gens to obtain the consulship was Titus Geganius Macerinus in 492 BC. The gens fell into obscurity even before the Samnite Wars, and is not mentioned again by Roman historians until the final century of the Republic.

== Origin ==
The Geganii claimed to be descended from Gyas, who accompanied Aeneas to Italy. They were said to be one of the noblest families of the Alban aristocracy, and were incorporated into the Roman state after that city's destruction by Tullus Hostilius. However, according to Plutarch, even before this a Gegania is supposed to have been one of the first Vestal Virgins, appointed by Numa Pompilius. Elsewhere, Plutarch describes a Gegania who was the wife of Servius Tullius, although Dionysius makes her the wife of Lucius Tarquinius Priscus. A third Gegania is mentioned by Plutarch during the time of Lucius Tarquinius Superbus.

== Praenomina ==
The Geganii mentioned in history bore the common praenomina Lucius, Marcus, and Titus, with one example of the rare praenomen Proculus. Those found in inscriptions mostly bore the names Lucius, Sextus, and Marcus, although other praenomina are occasionally found, including Aulus, Publius, and Quintus. As the inscription naming the priest Clesipus Geganius cannot be securely dated, it is unclear what sort of name "Clesipus" is, although it may be a cognomen being used in place of a praenomen, or an instance of the sort of polyonymous nomenclature that was typical of Imperial times.

== Branches and cognomina ==
The only family of the Geganii during the early Republic bore the cognomen Macerinus, a diminutive of Macer, meaning "lean" or "skinny". Epigraphic sources mention a number of Geganii living under the early Empire, bearing a variety of surnames, but there is no evidence of how they were related to their Republican forebears.

== Members ==
This list includes abbreviated praenomina. For an explanation of this practice, see filiation.

- Gegania, one of the first Vestal Virgins, selected by Numa Pompilius, the second king of Rome.
- Gegania, according to one tradition, the wife of Servius Tullius, the sixth King of Rome. Dionysius makes Gegania the wife of Lucius Tarquinius Priscus, the fifth king of Rome. However, according to most traditions, Tarquin's wife, Tanaquil, survived him and ensured the succession of Servius Tullius.
- Gegania, the mother of Pinarius, lived during the time of Lucius Tarquinius Superbus, the seventh and last king of Rome; her quarrel with her daughter-in-law Thalaea was cited by Plutarch as a rare example of domestic disharmony at early Rome.
- Titus Geganius Macerinus, consul in 492 BC, faced a severe famine, which was blamed on the first secession of the plebeians. He dispatched his brother, Lucius, to Sicily in order to acquire grain.
- Lucius Geganius Macerinus, brother of Titus Geganius Macerinus, the consul of 492 BC, sent to Sicily in hopes of obtaining grain.
- Marcus Geganius M. f. Macerinus, consul in 447, 443, and 437 BC, and censor in 435. During his second consulship, he defeated the Volscians, and was awarded a triumph.
- Proculus Geganius (M. f.) Macerinus, consul in 440 BC.
- Lucius Geganius Macerinus, consular tribune in 378 BC.
- Marcus Geganius Macerinus, consular tribune in 367 BC, the year that the lex Licinia Sextia was passed into law, admitting plebeians to the consulship, and abolishing the consular tribunate.
- Lucius Geganius, together with Gnaeus Cornelius Dolabella, was killed in the unrest instigated by Lucius Appuleius Saturninus in 100 BC.
- Sextus Geganius P. f. Galle, buried at Tuscania in Etruria, aged seventy, in a tomb dating from the second quarter of the first century BC.
- Lucius Geganius Philargyrus, named in an early first-century inscription from Rome.
- Lucius Geganius Romulus, one of the curatores sociorum at Rome, along with Publius Decimius Tritus, dedicated a gift of six pots, according to an inscription dating from the first half of the first century.
- Gegania L. l. Sopatra, a freedwoman who built a tomb at Fundi in Latium, dating to the first half of the first century, for herself and Diodorus, the overseer of Vipsanius.
- Quintus Geganius L. f., a haruspex and one of the seviri Augustales, buried at Florentia in Etruria, in a mid-first century tomb built at public expense, along with his wife, Vibia Tertulla, and mother, Vettia.
- Gegania, named in an inscription from Pompeii in Campania.
- Lucius Geganius Anthus, named in a sepulchral inscription from Rome, dating from the early or mid-first century.
- Lucius Geganius Hymenaeus, named in a mid-first century sepulchral inscription from Pompeii.
- Aulus Geganius Ma[...], named in an inscription from Pompeii.
- Geganius Romulus, named in a first-century inscription from Pompeii.
- Geganius Nicomachus, named in a first-century inscription from Rome.
- Gegania Prima, buried in a first-century sepulchre at Rome, built by her husband, Gnaeus Pompeius Olympicus, for their family.
- Geganius Facundus, an eques named in a dedicatory inscription from Fanum Fortunae in Umbria, dating from the late first or early second century.
- Lucius Geganius, named in a first- or second-century sepulchral inscription from Rome, along with Gerinia Tertia.
- Sextus Geganius Sex. f. Festus, a boy buried at Pisaurum in Umbria, aged eleven years, fifty days, in a tomb dedicated by his parents, Gaius Mutteius Eurus and Disidia Lanthanusa.
- Lucius Geganius Philargyrus, buried in a first- or second-century tomb at Rome, built by Lucius Geganius Stephanus for himself and his family.
- Lucius Geganius Stephanus, dedicated a first- or second-century tomb at Rome for himself and his family, including Lucius Geganius Philargyrus.
- Lucius Geganius L. l. Eros Crispus, a freedman who dedicated a tomb at Rome for himself, the freedwoman Gegania Hierissa, and their family, dating to the late first or early second century.
- Gegania L. l. Hierissa, a freedwoman buried at Rome, in a tomb built by Lucius Geganius Eros Crispus.
- Sextus Geganius Chrstus, buried at Praeneste in Latium, in a tomb built by his sister, Gegania Vitalis, dating to the first half of the second century.
- Gegania Vitalis, dedicated a second-century tomb at Praeneste for her brother, Sextus Geganius Chrestus.
- Sextus Geganius Gegula, a native of Praeneste, was leader of the first cohort of Lusitanian auxiles, a cavalry unit serving in an uncertain province in AD 151, during the reign of Antoninus Pius.
- Lucius Geganius Victorinus, a soldier in the ninth cohort of the Praetorian Guard, buried at Praeneste, aged twenty-nine, in a tomb built by his parents, and dating from the second century, or the second half of the first.

=== Undated Geganii ===
- Clesipus Geganius, master of the Luperci, a priestly order, buried at Ulubrae in Latium.
- Lucius Geganius, a potter whose maker's mark was found at Antium in Latium.
- Sextus Geganius, the former master of Palladius, a freedman mentioned in an inscription from Etruria.
- Lucius Geganius Acutus, built a sepulchre at Rome for the child Lucius Geganius Primus, on behalf of Lucius Geganius Hilarus.
- Gegania Arsine, named in a sepulchral inscription from Rome.
- Marcus Geganius M. l. Demetrius, a freedman, dedicated a tomb at Rome for the freedwoman Caesia Prima.
- Sextus Geganius Fimbria, one of the municipal duumvirs at Praeneste, where he served alongside Publius Annius Septimus.
- Gegania Graphe, named in a sepulchral inscription from Rome.
- Gegania L. l. Hilara, a freedwoman named in a sepulchral inscription from Rome, along with the freedman Gaius Julius Tertius.
- Lucius Geganius Hilarus, named in a sepulchral inscription from Rome, from a tomb built by Lucius Geganius Acutus for the child Lucius Geganius Primus.
- Lucius Geganius Ɔ. l. Januarius, a freed child buried at Rome, aged two.
- Marcus Geganius Pamphilus, named in an inscription from Narbo in Gallia Narbonensis.
- Lucius Geganius Ɔ. l. Primus, a freed child buried at Rome, aged two years, six months, in a tomb built by Lucius Geganius Acutus on behalf of Lucius Geganius Hilarus.

== See also ==
- List of Roman gentes

== Bibliography ==
- Diodorus Siculus, Bibliotheca Historica (Library of History).
- Dionysius of Halicarnassus, Romaike Archaiologia (Roman Antiquities).
- Titus Livius (Livy), History of Rome.
- Plutarchus, Lives of the Noble Greeks and Romans, De Fortuna Romanorum.
- Paulus Orosius, Historiarum Adversum Paganos (History Against the Pagans).
- Maurus Servius Honoratus (Servius), Ad Virgilii Aeneidem Commentarii (Commentary on Vergil's Aeneid).
- Joannes Zonaras, Epitome Historiarum (Epitome of History).
- Dictionary of Greek and Roman Biography and Mythology, William Smith, ed., Little, Brown and Company, Boston (1849).
- Theodor Mommsen et alii, Corpus Inscriptionum Latinarum (The Body of Latin Inscriptions, abbreviated CIL), Berlin-Brandenburgische Akademie der Wissenschaften (1853–present).
- Notizie degli Scavi di Antichità (News of Excavations from Antiquity, abbreviated NSA), Accademia dei Lincei (1876–present).
- René Cagnat et alii, L'Année épigraphique (The Year in Epigraphy, abbreviated AE), Presses Universitaires de France (1888–present).
- George Davis Chase, "The Origin of Roman Praenomina", in Harvard Studies in Classical Philology, vol. VIII (1897).
- T. Robert S. Broughton, The Magistrates of the Roman Republic, American Philological Association (1952–1986).
- Olli Salomies, “Adoptive and Polyonymous Nomenclature in the Roman Empire—Some Addenda”, in Epigrafie e Ordine Senatorio, 30 Anni Dopo, Edizioni Quasar, Rome, pp. 511–536 (2014).
