= Aerarii =

Class of Roman citizens

The aerarii (from Lat. aes, "bronze" or "money" in its subsidiary sense of "poll tax") were a class of Roman citizens not included in the thirty wards of Servius Tullius, and subject to a poll-tax arbitrarily fixed by the censor. They were:

- The inhabitants of conquered towns which had been deprived of local self-government, who possessed the jus conubii (right of legal marriage) and jus commercii (right to engage in lawful business), but no political rights. Caere is said to have been the first example of this (353 BC). Hence the expression "in tabulas Caeritum referre" came to mean " to degrade to the status of an aerarius."
- Full citizens subjected to civil degradation (infamia) as the result of following certain professions (primarily the performing arts), of dishonourable acts in private life (for instance stuprum) or of conviction for certain crimes.
- Persons "branded" (stigmatized by receiving a nota, essentially a "black mark") by the censor.

Those who were thus excluded from the tribes and centuries had no vote were incapable of filling Roman magistracies, and could not serve in the army. According to Theodore Mommsen, the aerarii were originally the non-assidui (non-holders of land), excluded from the tribes, the comitia and the army. By a reform of the censor Appius Claudius Caecus in 312 BC these non-assidui were admitted into the tribes, and the aerarii as such disappeared. But in 304, Fabius Rullianus limited them to the four city tribes, and from that time the term meant a man degraded from a higher (rural) to a lower (urban) tribe, but not deprived of the right of voting or of serving in the army.

The expressions tribu movere and aerarium facere, regarded by Mommsen as identical in meaning ("to degrade from a higher tribe to a lower"), are explained by Greenidge the first as relegation from a higher to a lower tribe or total exclusion from the tribes, the second as exclusion from the centuries. Other views of the original aerarii are that they were: artisans and freedmen (Niebuhr); inhabitants of towns united with Rome by a hospitium publicum, who had become domiciled on Roman territory (Lange); only a class of degraded citizens, including neither the cives sine suffragio nor the artisans (according to Johan Nicolai Madvig); identical with the capite censi of the Servian constitution (Belot, Greenidge).
