= Capture of Fidenae (435 BC) =

Battle between the Fidenates and Rome

- Part of Rome's early Italian campaigns
Date	435 BC
Location	Fidenae, about 8 km north of Rome
Result	Roman victory

Belligerents
Roman Republic	Fidenae

Commanders and leaders
Quintus Servilius Priscus Structus Fidenas; Postumus Aebutius Helva Cornicen	Unknown

The Capture of Fidenae was a battle fought in 435 BC between the Fidenates and the Roman Republic under dictator Quintus Servilius Priscus Structus Fidenas.

== Background ==
Following an incident earlier in 435 BC in which Fidenates entered Roman territory and ravaged it, Priscus was appointed dictator for the year by the Senate. Priscus chose former consul Postumus Aebutius Helva Cornicen to join him as his magister equitum.

== Battle ==
Priscus ordered that all men strong enough to bear arms were to muster at the Porta Collina. From there they marched north in the direction of Fidenae. They first engaged the Fidenates past Fidenae near Nomentum, and the Fidenates were driven southwards back into Fidenae. Priscus built circumvallation around the town. Because of the town's elevation and its bountiful resources and supplies, Priscus decided not to lay siege or charge into the city. He instead decided to exploit the natural fortifications on the opposite side of town in order to enter it. He divided his army in such a way that certain groups would be able to constantly attack the walls of the town while another would be able to work on tunnelling through the hill. When the hill was finally tunnelled through, the Romans entered the town, taking the Fidenates, who had been preoccupied with the attackers at the walls, by surprise.

== Aftermath ==
Priscus was given the cognomen "Fidenas" because of his victory.
