= Spurius Postumius Albus Regillensis (consular tribune 432 BC) =

Roman consular tribune in 432 BC

Spurius Postumius Albus Regillensis, apparently the son of the Spurius Postumius Albus Regillensis who was consul in 466 BC, was a patrician politician of ancient Rome. He was appointed consular tribune in 432 BC, and served as legatus in the war in the following year, under the dictator Aulus Postumius Tubertus. Livy mentions him leading a group of reinforcements at a critical moment.

== See also ==
- Postumia gens
- Albinus (cognomen)

Political offices
Preceded by Marcus Fabius Vibulanus, Lucius Sergius Fidenas, Marcus Foslius Flaccinator as Consular tribunes	Consular tribune of the Roman Republic; 432 BC with Lucius Pinarius Mamercinus, Lucius Furius Medullinus	Succeeded by Titus Quinctius Poenus Cincinnatus, Gaius Julius Mento as Consuls
