= Postumus Aebutius Helva Cornicen =

5th-century BC Roman senator and general

Postumus Aebutius Helva Cornicen (fl. c. 442–435 BC) was consul at Rome in 442 BC, and magister equitum in 435.

== Consulship ==
Aebutius was elected consul for the year 442, with Marcus Fabius Vibulanus. Their year of office was peaceful, and commissioners were appointed to establish a colony at Ardea. Many Romans wanted the colony to receive the majority of the land distributed, but it was decided to allot it first to the Rutuli, who were native to Ardea, and give the Roman colonists the remaining land. One of the commissioners was Marcus Aebutius Helva, probably a relative of the consul.

== Magister Equitum ==
In 435, a force of Fidenates, with re-inforcements from Veii, took advantage of a pestilence at Rome. They entered Roman territory, and crossing the Anio, advanced almost as far as the Colline Gate, when Quintus Servilius Priscus was appointed dictator. Postumus Aebutius was named magister equitum, and the two gathered a volunteer force just outside the gate. This induced the Fidenates to retreat, but Servilius and Postumius pursued them to Fidenae. Finding that normal siege tactics would be ineffective against the fortified hilltop, the Romans breached the walls with sappers, and took the citadel, bringing Fidenae under Roman control.

== See also ==
- Aebutia gens – Ancient Roman family
- Capture of Fidenae

Political offices
Preceded by Marcus Geganius Macerinus; Titus Quinctius Capitolinus Barbatus	Roman consul with Marcus Fabius Vibulanus; 442 BC	Succeeded by Gaius Furius Pacilus Fusus; Manius Papirius Crassus
