= Quintus Servilius Priscus Fidenas =

5th century BC Roman senator, dictator and general

Quintus Servilius Priscus Fidenas (prior to 463 BC – 390 BC) was a political figure and military leader in the Roman Republic who served as dictator in 435 BC and in 418 BC.

== Family ==
Servilius belonged to the large and influential Servilia gens. Through his filiation he was the son of Publius Servilius Priscus, consul in 463 BC, and possibly grandson of Spurius Servilius Structus, consul in 476 BC. He is most likely the father of Quintus Servilius Fidenas who was elected six times as consular tribune.

== Career ==
=== Augur/Pontifex ===
Servilius was appointed to replace Spurius Postumius Albus Regillensis in his religious functions, when the later died in 439 BC. As the only two sources mentioning this event are in disagreement if the office was that of an Augur or that of a Pontifex maximus it remains unclear which religious office Servilius held.

=== First Dictatorship ===
Although he had never held the consulship Servilius was appointed as dictator in 435 BC. The year had seen the escalation of the war with the Fidenates and a dictator was deemed necessary to finish the war. He selected the former consul Postumus Aebutius Helva Cornicen as his magister equitum, or vice-dictator, and successfully defeated and captured Fidenae.

=== Commission of 428 BC ===
Servilius career would remain closely attached to Fidenae and when the Fidenates were suspected of having supported the Veientane in raids against Rome in 428 BC, Servilius were appointed by the senate to be part of a special commission sent to investigate the matter. He was joined in this commission by former consul Lucius Sergius Fidenas and another former dictator, Mamercus Aemilius Mamercinus.

=== Second Dictatorship ===
In 418 BC Servilius was appointed to his second dictatorship. The appointment came after his former commission colleague, Lucius Sergius Fidenas, had been defeated by the combined forced of the Aequi and Labicani. Servilius appointed a relative and consular tribune of this year, Gaius Servilius Axilla, as his magister equitum. This dictatorship, like his first, was a great success, and Servilius went on to defeat the Aequi and capture Labici.

== Death ==
He is listed as having died in 390 BC and that he was succeeded by Marcus Furius Fusus in his religious office as augur or pontifex. Considering that 390 BC was in the close aftermath of the semi-legendary Battle of Allia, it is possible that Servilius was killed in the conflict or the following sack/siege of Rome, or that he simply died of unrelated causes in the same year as the events.

== See also ==
- Servilia gens
- Capture of Fidenae (435 BC)
