= Sextus Julius Iullus =

5th-century BC Roman patrician and consular tribune

Sextus Julius Iullus was a consular tribune of the Roman Republic in 424 BC.

Julius belonged to the patrician Julia gens and the branch known as the Julii Iulli, one of the early republics most influential families having produced five consuls prior to Sextus Julius. He is the first known Sextus among the Julii, a praenomen otherwise associated with a younger branch, the Julii Caesares, who appeared by the end of the 3rd century BC. As no filiations have survived it remains unclear of Julius connection to the other known Julii Iulli of the period, but there remains a possibility that Lucius Julius Iullus, consular tribune in 388 and 379 BC, was his son.

== Consular tribune ==
In 424 BC Julius was elected as consular tribune together with Appius Claudius Crassus, Lucius Sergius Fidenas and Spurius Nautius Rutilus. Julius seems to have spent most of his consular time outside of Rome, probably leading armies in the field, as Livy mentions that only his colleague Claudius remained in Rome for the comitia and the election of the consular college of 423 BC.

Livy in reporting the consular college of 424 BC has Julius with the cognomen of Tullus, a cognomen that is otherwise associated with the Volscatia, a contemporary gens to Livy who rose to prominence in the 1st century BC. This, in combination with that the other sources are in agreement of Iullus/Iulus, makes it likely that the ancient historian should be considered to have made a mistake here.

== See also ==
- Julia gens – Ancient Roman family

Political offices
Preceded by Aulus Sempronius Atratinus; Lucius Quinctius Cincinnatus II; Lucius Furius Medullinus II; Lucius Horatius Barbatus as Consular Tribunes	Consular tribune of the Roman Republic with Appius Claudius Crassus; Lucius Sergius Fidenas; Spurius Nautius Rutilus; 424 BC	Succeeded by Gaius Sempronius Atratinus; Quintus Fabius Vibulanus as Consuls
