= Lucius Papirius Crassus (consul 436 BC) =

Roman consul in 436 BC

Lucius Papirius Crassus was a consul of the Roman Republic in 436 BC and possibly a censor in 430 BC.

He belonged to the ancient Papiria gens, and more specifically to a relatively new branch of the Papiria known as the Crassi. The branch had first reached the consulship in 441 BC under the presumed brother of Lucius, a Manius Papirius Crassus. Another brother or relative would reach the consulship in 430 BC, Gaius Papirius Crassus.

== Career ==
Papirius was elected consul in 436 BC together with Marcus Cornelius Maluginensis. They led raids against the Veii and the Falisci. During their consulship the tribune of the plebs, Spurius Maelius, proposed a bill targeting two senators, Gaius Servilius Ahala and Lucius Minucius Esquilinus Augurinus. The goal was to confiscate the property of Ahala, mark him as a caedes civis indemnati (loosely translated: unlawful murderer) and to condemn Minucius for false accusation. Maelius, who was a son or close relative of Spurius Maelius who had been accused of attempting a uprising in 439 BC had been murdered by Ahala, and prior to this accused of the uprising by Minucius. The attempted bill by the tribune failed, and the two patricians were acquitted.

Papirius was elected as censor in 430 BC together with a Publius Pinarius (possibly Lucius Pinarius Mamercus). The censors enacted several fines which were so severe that the consuls passed a law allowing fines to be paid in coins instead of livestock.

== Conflicting identity ==
The different ancient sources covering the year 430 BC are in disagreement in regards to the identity of both the consuls and the censors of this year. The two consuls are traditionally identified as Gaius Papirius Crassus and Lucius Julius Iulus, the praenomens varies between sources. Cicero names them Publius Papirius and Gaius Julius; Diodorus names them Gaius Papirius and Lucius Junius; and Cassiodorus names them Lucius Papirius and Lucius Julius. The majority of our other sources do not specify a praenomen and only give the cognomen of Crassus and Iulus. If one follows Cassiodorus then this consul of 430 BC should probably be identified as the same person as our Lucius Papirius Crassus, the consul of 436 BC.

If this is the case, then another conflict arises, as he can not both be one of the consuls and one of the censors in 430 BC. The censors of 430 BC are named as Lucius Papirius and Publius Pinarius by both Cicero and Livy. As the other known Lucii Papirii (Lucius Papirius Mugillanus and Lucius Papirius Mugillanus) active in this period either held the censorship previously (443 BC) or would go on to hold it (418 BC) and the first and only known repeated censor is Gaius Marcius Rutilus Censorinus (censor in 294 and 265 BC); thus making Lucius Papirius Crassus the consul of 436 BC the most likely choice of censor.

== See also ==
- Papiria gens – Ancient Roman family

Political offices
Preceded by Marcus Geganius Macerinus; Lucius Sergius Fidenas	Roman Consul with Marcus Cornelius Maluginensis (consul 436 BC); 436 BC	Succeeded by Gaius Julius Iulus (consul 447 BC); Proculus Verginius Tricostus
