= Marcus Horatius Turrinus Barbatus =

5th-century BC Roman senator and consul

Marcus Horatius Turrinus Barbatus (fl. c. 450–449 BC) was a Roman senator from the early Republic, who served as consul in 449 BC alongside Lucius Valerius Poplicola Potitus. According to Roman historical tradition, he and Valerius played an important role in ending the Decemvirate and bringing harmony between the patrician and plebeian orders. To the two consuls are traditionally attributed the Valerio-Horatian Laws, which gave full force of law to measures passed by plebiscite, restored the right of any citizen to appeal to the people, and confirmed the sacrosanctity of plebeian tribunes. The historicity of these laws has been doubted.

During his consulship, Horatius also held a command against the Sabines, and celebrated a triumph, against the wishes of the Senate but supported by popular vote.

The pairing of Valerius and Horatius has raised doubts about their authenticity due to the similarity with the pair Publius Valerius Poplicola and Marcus Horatius Pulvillus in 509 and 507 BC, but Ogilvie accepts the historicity of Horatius Barbatus himself.

== Endnotes ==
Preceded by the Decemvirate	Roman consul 449 BC; With: Lucius Valerius	Succeeded by Lars Herminius; Titus Verginius
