= Mamercus Aemilius Mamercinus =

5th-century BC Roman consul and dictator

Mamercus Aemilius Mamercinus was a political figure in the Roman Republic, serving as consular tribune in 438 BC and dictator three times in 437, 434, and 426 BC.

Prior to gaining the imperium Aemilius was, in 446 BC, elected quaestor together with Lucius Valerius Potitus. They were, according to Tacitus, the first elected quaestors of the Republic.

His first and third dictatorships involved wars against the Veintines and Fidenates. He was victorious both times, capturing Fidenae in 426 BC.

His second dictatorship in 434 BC was occasioned by fear of an impending war with Etruria, but that war never materialized and Mamercinus instead used his office to propose cutting the term of the censors from five years to eighteen months. This change was submitted to the Tribal Assembly, which approved it, resulting in the lex Aemilia de censura minuenda. In retaliation, the censors used the power of their office to strike him from his tribe, increase his tax burden eight-fold, and brand him an aerarius.

Political offices
Preceded by Agrippa Menenius Lanatus, and Titus Quinctius Capitolinus Barbatus VI as Consuls of the Roman Republic	Consular Tribune of the Roman Republic; 438 with Lucius Julius Iulus; Lucius Quinctius Cincinnatus	Succeeded by Marcus Geganius Macerinus III, and Lucius Sergius Fidenas as Consuls of the Roman Republic
