= Aulus Postumius Tubertus =

Roman dictator in 431 BC

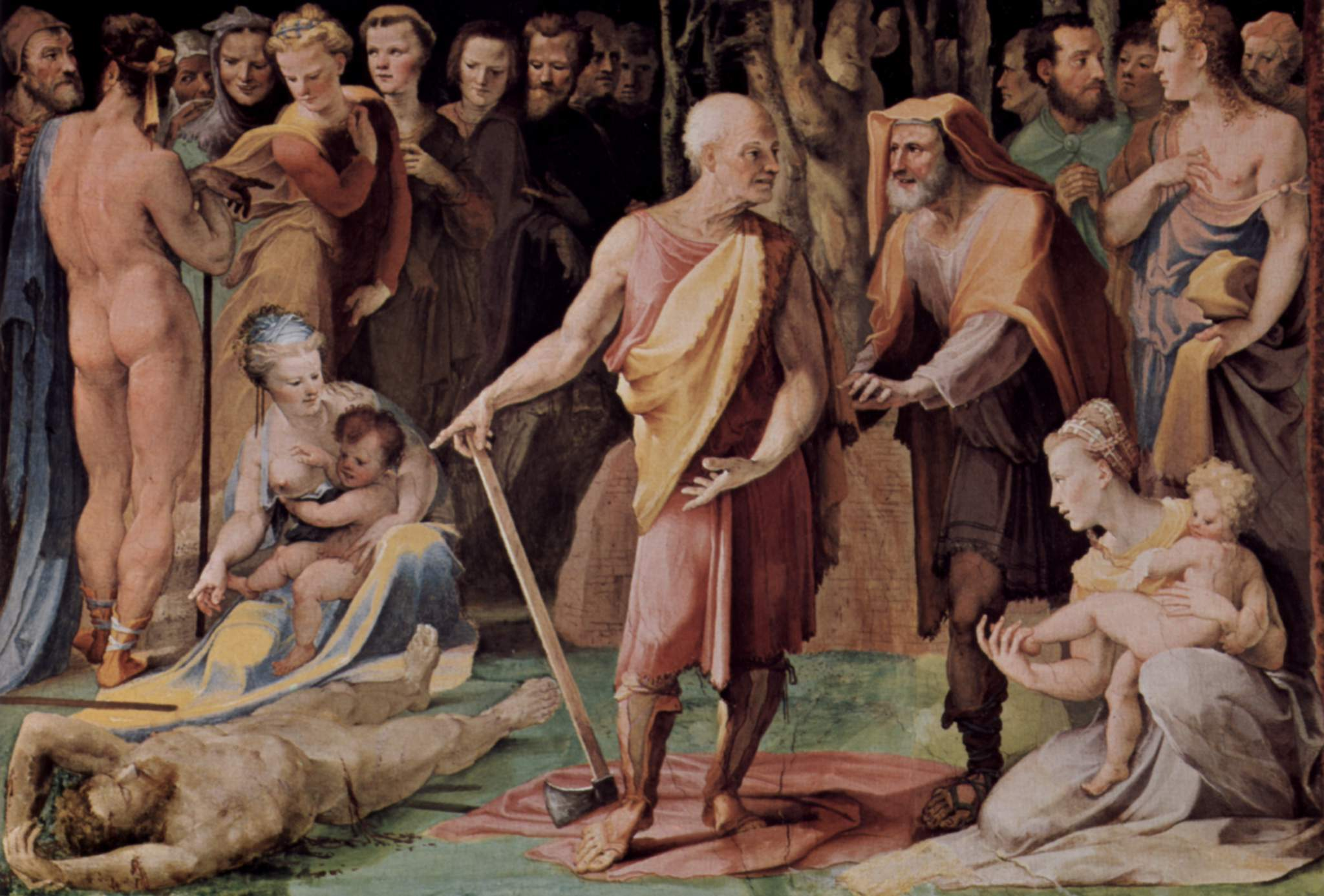
Postumius kills his son for betraying his orders by Beccafumi for Palazzo Pubblico in Siena

Aulus Postumius Tubertus was a Roman military leader in the wars with the Aequi and Volsci during the fifth century BC. He served as Magister Equitum under the dictator Mamercus Aemilius Mamercinus in 434 BC, and was dictator himself in 431.

Postumius' son-in-law was Titus Quinctius Cincinnatus Pennus, consul in 431 and 428 BC. When it was decided to appoint a dictator to undertake the war with the Aequi and Volsci in 431, the consuls could not agree, and by lot the choice fell to Cincinnatus, who nominated his father-in-law. The two men proceeded against the enemy, and on the 18th of June, won a great victory over the Aequi and Volsci at Mount Algidus. This was the site of a previous victory over the Aequi by the dictator Lucius Quinctius Cincinnatus in 458 BC. That of 431 was the last major battle between Rome and the Aequi, and on his return, Postumius received a triumph.

A well-known story tells that during this campaign, Postumius' son was so eager to engage the enemy that he quitted the post assigned him by his father, and that in consequence Postumius had him put to death. Livy doubted the truth of this account, noting that a similar and more infamous tradition was associated with Titus Manlius Torquatus, consul in 347, 344, and 340 BC. However, Niebuhr felt that Livy's reasoning was insufficient to dismiss the story.

== See also ==
- Postumia gens
- List of Roman dictators

== Bibliography ==
- Diodorus Siculus, Bibliotheca Historica (Library of History).
- Titus Livius (Livy), History of Rome.
- Publius Ovidius Naso (Ovid), Fasti.
- Valerius Maximus, Factorum ac Dictorum Memorabilium (Memorable Facts and Sayings).
- Plutarchus, Lives of the Noble Greeks and Romans.
- Aulus Gellius, Noctes Atticae (Attic Nights).
- Barthold Georg Niebuhr, The History of Rome, Julius Charles Hare and Connop Thirlwall, trans., John Smith, Cambridge (1828).
- Dictionary of Greek and Roman Biography and Mythology, William Smith, ed., Little, Brown and Company, Boston (1849).
