= Roman censor =

Roman magistrate and census administrator

The censor was a magistrate in ancient Rome who was responsible for maintaining the census, supervising public morality, and overseeing certain aspects of the government's finances.

Established under the Roman Republic, power of the censor was limited in subject matter but absolute within his sphere: in matters reserved for the censors, no magistrate could oppose his decisions, and only another censor who succeeded him could cancel those decisions. Censors were also given unusually long terms of office; unlike other elected offices of the Republic, which (excluding certain priests elected for life) had terms of 12 months or less, censors' terms were generally 18 months to 5 years (depending on the era). The censorate was thus highly prestigious, preceding all other regular magistracies in dignity if not in power and reserved with rare exceptions for former consuls. Attaining the censorship would thus be considered the crowning achievement of a Roman politician on the cursus honorum. However, the magistracy as a regular office did not survive the transition from the Republic to the Empire.

The censor's regulation of public morality is the origin of the modern meaning of the words censor and censorship.

== Early history of the magistracy ==
According to Livy's History of Rome, the census was first instituted by Servius Tullius, sixth king of Rome, c. 575–535 BC. After the abolition of the monarchy and the founding of the Republic in 509 BC, the consuls had responsibility for the census until 443 BC. In 444 BC, no consuls were elected, but tribunes with consular power were appointed instead. This was a move by the plebeians to try to attain higher magistracies: only patricians could be elected consuls, while some military tribunes were plebeians. To prevent the possibility of plebeians obtaining control of the census, the patricians removed the right to take the census from the consuls and tribunes, and appointed for this duty two magistrates, called censores (censors), elected exclusively from the patricians in Rome.

The magistracy continued to be controlled by patricians until 351 BC, when Gaius Marcius Rutilus was appointed the first plebeian censor. Twelve years later, in 339 BC, one of the Publilian laws required that one censor had to be a plebeian. Despite this, no plebeian censor performed the solemn purification of the people (the lustrum; Livy Periochae 13) until 280 BC. In 131 BC, for the first time, both censors were plebeians.

The reason for having two censors was that the two consuls had previously taken the census together. If one of the censors died during his term of office, another was chosen to replace him, just as with consuls. This happened only once, in 393 BC. However, the Gauls captured Rome in that lustrum (five-year period), and the Romans thereafter regarded such replacement as "an offense against religion". From then on, if one of the censors died, his colleague resigned, and two new censors were chosen to replace them.

The office of censor was limited to eighteen months by a law proposed by the dictator Mamercus Aemilius Mamercinus. During the censorship of Appius Claudius Caecus (312–308 BC) the prestige of the censorship massively increased. Caecus built the first-ever Roman road (the Via Appia) and the first Roman aqueduct (the Aqua Appia), both named after him. He changed the organisation of the Roman tribes and was the first censor to draw the list of senators. He also advocated the founding of Roman coloniae throughout Latium and Campania to support the Roman war effort in the Second Samnite War. With these efforts and reforms, Appius Claudius Caecus was able to hold the censorship for a whole lustrum (five-year period), and the office of censor, subsequently entrusted with various important duties, eventually attained one of the highest political statuses in the Roman Republic, second only to that of the consuls.

== Election ==
The censors were elected in the Centuriate Assembly, which met under the presidency of a consul. Barthold Niebuhr suggests that the censors were at first elected by the Curiate Assembly, and that the Assembly's selections were confirmed by the Centuriate, but William Smith believes that "there is no authority for this supposition, and the truth of it depends entirely upon the correctness of [Niebuhr's] views respecting the election of the consuls". Both censors had to be elected on the same day, and accordingly if the voting for the second was not finished in the same day, the election of the first was invalidated, and a new assembly had to be held.

The assembly for the election of the censors was held under different auspices from those at the election of the consuls and praetors, so the censors were not regarded as their colleagues, although they likewise possessed the maxima auspicia. The assembly was held by the new consuls shortly after they began their term of office; and the censors, as soon as they were elected and the censorial power had been granted to them by a decree of the Centuriate Assembly (lex centuriata), were fully installed in their office.

As a general principle, the only ones eligible for the office of censor were those who had previously been consuls, but there were a few exceptions. At first, there was no law to prevent a person being censor twice, but the only person who was elected to the office twice was Gaius Marcius Rutilus in 265 BC. In that year, he originated a law stating that no one could be elected censor twice. In consequence of this, he received the cognomen of Censorinus.

== Attributes ==
The censorship differed from all other Roman magistracies in the length of office. The censors were originally chosen for a whole lustrum (a period of five years), but as early as ten years after its institution (433 BC) their office was limited to eighteen months by a law of Dictator Mamercus Aemilius Mamercinus. The censors were also unique with respect to rank and dignity. They had no imperium, and accordingly no lictors. Their rank was granted to them by the Centuriate Assembly, and not by the curiae, and in that respect they were inferior in power to the consuls and praetors.

Notwithstanding this, the censorship was regarded as the highest dignity in the state, with the exception of the dictatorship; it was a "sacred magistracy" (sanctus magistratus), to which the deepest reverence was due. The high rank and dignity which the censorship obtained was due to the various important duties gradually entrusted to it, and especially to its possessing the regimen morum, or general control over the conduct and the morals of the citizens. In the exercise of this power, they were regulated solely by their own views of duty, and were not responsible to any other power in the state.

The censors possessed the official stool called a "curule chair" (sella curulis), but some doubt exists with respect to their official dress. A well-known passage of Polybius describes the use of the imagines at funerals; we may conclude that a consul or praetor wore the purple-bordered toga praetexta, one who triumphed the embroidered toga picta, and the censor a purple toga peculiar to him, but other writers speak of their official dress as being the same as that of the other higher magistrates. The funeral of a censor was always conducted with great pomp and splendour, and hence a "censorial funeral" (funus censorium) was voted even to the emperors.

== Abolition ==
The censorship continued in existence for 421 years, from 443 BC to 22 BC, but during this period, many lustra passed by without any censor being chosen at all. According to one statement, the office was abolished by Lucius Cornelius Sulla. Although the authority on which this statement rests is not of much weight, the fact itself is probable, since there was no census during the two lustra which elapsed from Sulla's dictatorship to Gnaeus Pompeius Magnus (Pompey)'s first consulship (82–70 BC), and any strict "imposition of morals" would have been found inconvenient to the aristocracy that supported Sulla.

If the censorship had been done away with by Sulla, it was at any rate restored in the consulship of Pompey and Marcus Licinius Crassus. Its power was limited by one of the laws of the tribune Publius Clodius Pulcher (58 BC), which prescribed certain regular forms of proceeding before the censors in expelling a person from the Roman Senate, and required that the censors be in agreement to exact this punishment. This law, however, was repealed in the third consulship of Pompey in 52 BC, on the urging of his colleague Q. Caecilius Metellus Scipio, but the office of the censorship never recovered its former power and influence.

During the civil wars which followed soon afterwards, no censors were elected; it was only after a long interval that they were again appointed, namely in 23 BC, when Augustus caused Lucius Munatius Plancus and Aemilius Lepidus Paullus to fill the office. This was the last time that such magistrates were appointed; the emperors in future discharged the duties of their office under the name of Praefectura Morum ("prefect of the morals").

Some of the emperors sometimes took the name of censor when they held a census of the Roman people; this was the case with Claudius, who appointed the elder Lucius Vitellius as his colleague, and with Vespasian, who likewise had a colleague in his son Titus. Domitian assumed the title of "perpetual censor" (censor perpetuus), but this example was not imitated by succeeding emperors. In the reign of Decius, the elder Valerian was nominated to the censorship, but declined the position.

== Duties ==
The duties of the censors may be divided into three classes, all of which were closely connected with one another:

1. The Census, register of all citizens and their property, confirmation or appointment of senators (lectio senatus, lit. 'reading of the Senate'), and recognition of those who qualified for the equestrian rank (recognitio equitum);
2. The Regimen Morum, keeping of public morals; and
3. The administration of the finances of the state, superintendence of public buildings, and erection of all new public works.

The original business of the censorship was at first of a much more limited kind, and was restricted almost entirely to taking the census, but the possession of this power gradually brought with it fresh power and new duties, as is shown below. A general view of these duties is briefly expressed in the following passage of Cicero: "Censores populi aevitates, soboles, familias pecuniasque censento: urbis templa, vias, aquas, aerarium, vectigalia tuento: populique partes in tribus distribunto: exin pecunias, aevitates, ordines patiunto: equitum, peditumque prolem describunto: caelibes esse prohibento: mores populi regunto: probrum in senatu ne relinquunto." This can be translated as: "The Censors are to determine the generations, origins, families, and properties of the people; they are to (watch over/protect) the city's temples, roads, waters, treasury, and taxes; they are to divide the people into three parts; next, they are to (allow/approve) the properties, generations, and ranks [of the people]; they are to describe the offspring of knights and footsoldiers; they are to forbid being unmarried; they are to guide the behavior of the people; they are not to overlook abuse in the Senate."

=== Census ===
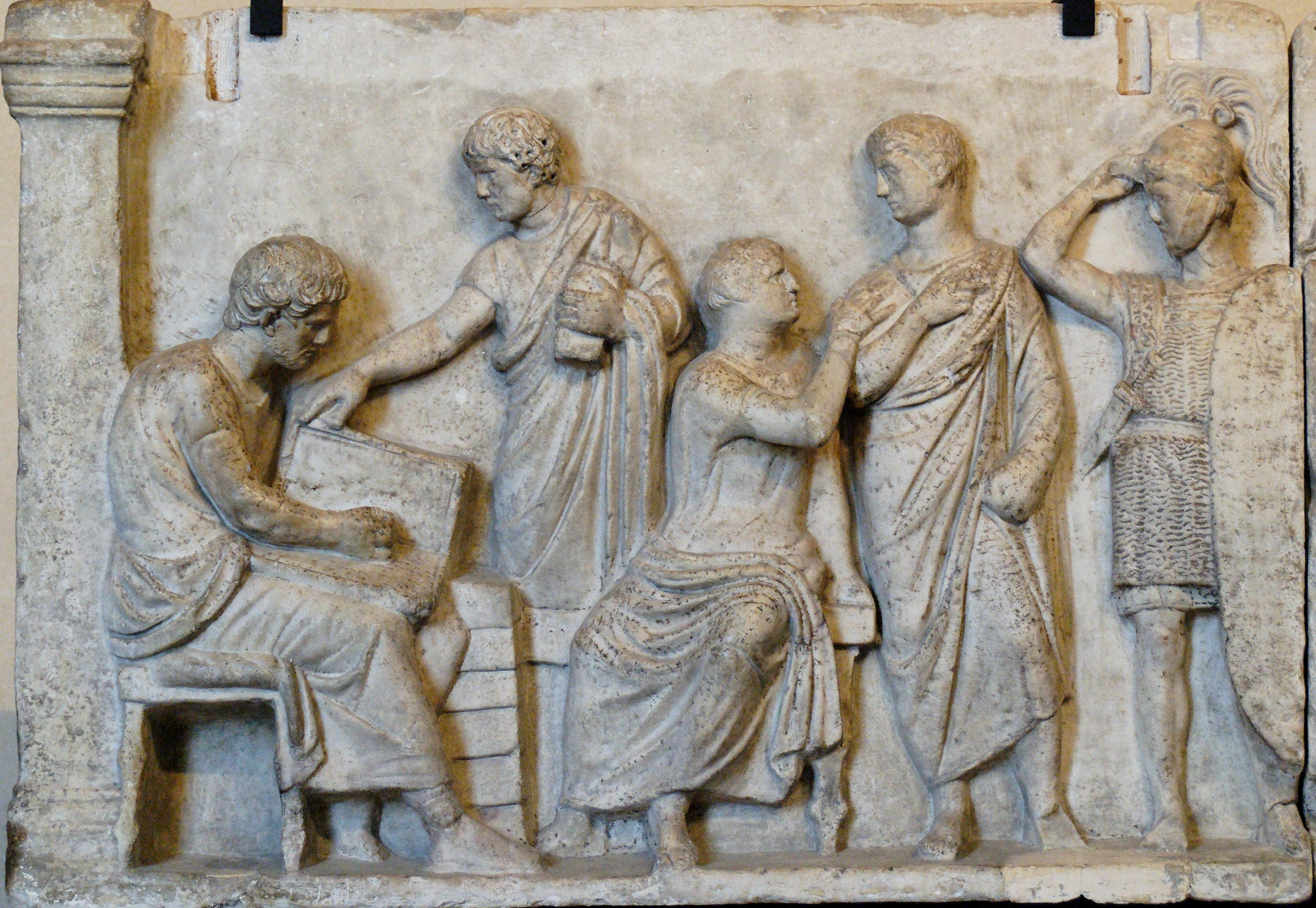
Scene of census-taking from the so-called Altar of Domitius Ahenobarbus, late 2nd century BC

The Census, the first and principal duty of the censors, was always held in the Campus Martius, and from the year 435 BC onwards, in a special building called Villa publica, which was erected for that purpose by the second pair of censors, Gaius Furius Pacilus Fusus and Marcus Geganius Macerinus. An account of the formalities with which the census was opened is given in a fragment of the Tabulae Censoriae, preserved by Varro. After the auspices had been taken, the citizens were summoned by a public crier to appear before the censors. Each tribe was called up separately, and the names in each tribe were probably taken according to the lists previously made out by the tribunes of the tribes. Every pater familias had to appear in person before the censors, who were seated in their curule chairs, and those names were taken first which were considered to be of good omen, such as Valerius, Salvius, Statorius, etc.

The Census was conducted according to the judgement of the censor (ad arbitrium censoris), but the censors laid down certain rules, sometimes called leges censui censendo, in which mention was made of the different kinds of property subject to the census, and in what way their value was to be estimated. According to these laws, each citizen had to give an account of himself, of his family, and of his property upon oath, "declared from the heart". First he had to give his full name (praenomen, nomen, and cognomen) and that of his father, or if he were a libertus ("freedman") that of his patron, and he was likewise obliged to state his age. He was then asked, "You, declaring from your heart, do you have a wife?" and if married he had to give the name of his wife, and likewise the number, names, and ages of his children, if any. Single women and orphans were represented by their guardians; their names were entered in separate lists, and they were not included in the sum total of heads.

After a citizen had stated his name, age, family, etc., he then had to give an account of all his property, so far as it was subject to the census. Only such things were liable to the census (censui censendo) as were property according to the Quiritary law. At first, each citizen appears to have merely given the value of his whole property in general without entering into details; but it soon became the practice to give a minute specification of each article, as well as the general value of the whole. Land formed the most important article of the census, but public land, the possession of which only belonged to a citizen, was excluded as not being Quiritarian property. Judging from the practice of the imperial period, it was the custom to give a most minute specification of all such land as a citizen held according to the Quiritarian law. He had to state the name and location of the land, and to specify what portion of it was arable, what meadow, what vineyard, and what olive-ground: and of the land thus described, he had to give his assessment of its value.

Slaves and cattle formed the next most important item. The censors also possessed the right of calling for a return of such objects as had not usually been given in, such as clothing, jewels, and carriages. It has been doubted by some modern writers whether the censors possessed the power of setting a higher valuation on the property than the citizens themselves gave, but given the discretionary nature of the censors' powers, and the necessity almost that existed, in order to prevent fraud, that the right of making a surcharge should be vested in somebody's hands, it is likely that the censors had this power. It is moreover expressly stated that on one occasion they made an extravagant surcharge on articles of luxury; and even if they did not enter in their books the property of a person at a higher value than he returned it, they accomplished the same end by compelling him to pay a tax upon the property at a higher rate than others. The tax was usually one per thousand upon the property entered in the books of the censors, but on one occasion the censors compelled a person to pay eight per thousand as a punishment.

A person who voluntarily absented himself from the census was considered incensus and subject to the severest punishment. Servius Tullius is said to have threatened such individuals with imprisonment and death, and in the Republican period he might be sold by the state as a slave. In the later period of the Republic, a person who was absent from the census might be represented by another, and be thus registered by the censors. Whether the soldiers who were absent on service had to appoint a representative is uncertain. In ancient times, the sudden outbreaks of war prevented the census from being taken, because a large number of the citizens would necessarily be absent. It is supposed from a passage in Livy that in later times the censors sent commissioners into the provinces with full powers to take the census of the Roman soldiers there, but this seems to have been a special case. It is, on the contrary, probable from the way in which Cicero pleads the absence of Archias from Rome with the army under Lucullus, as a sufficient reason for his not having been enrolled in the census, that service in the army was a valid excuse for absence.

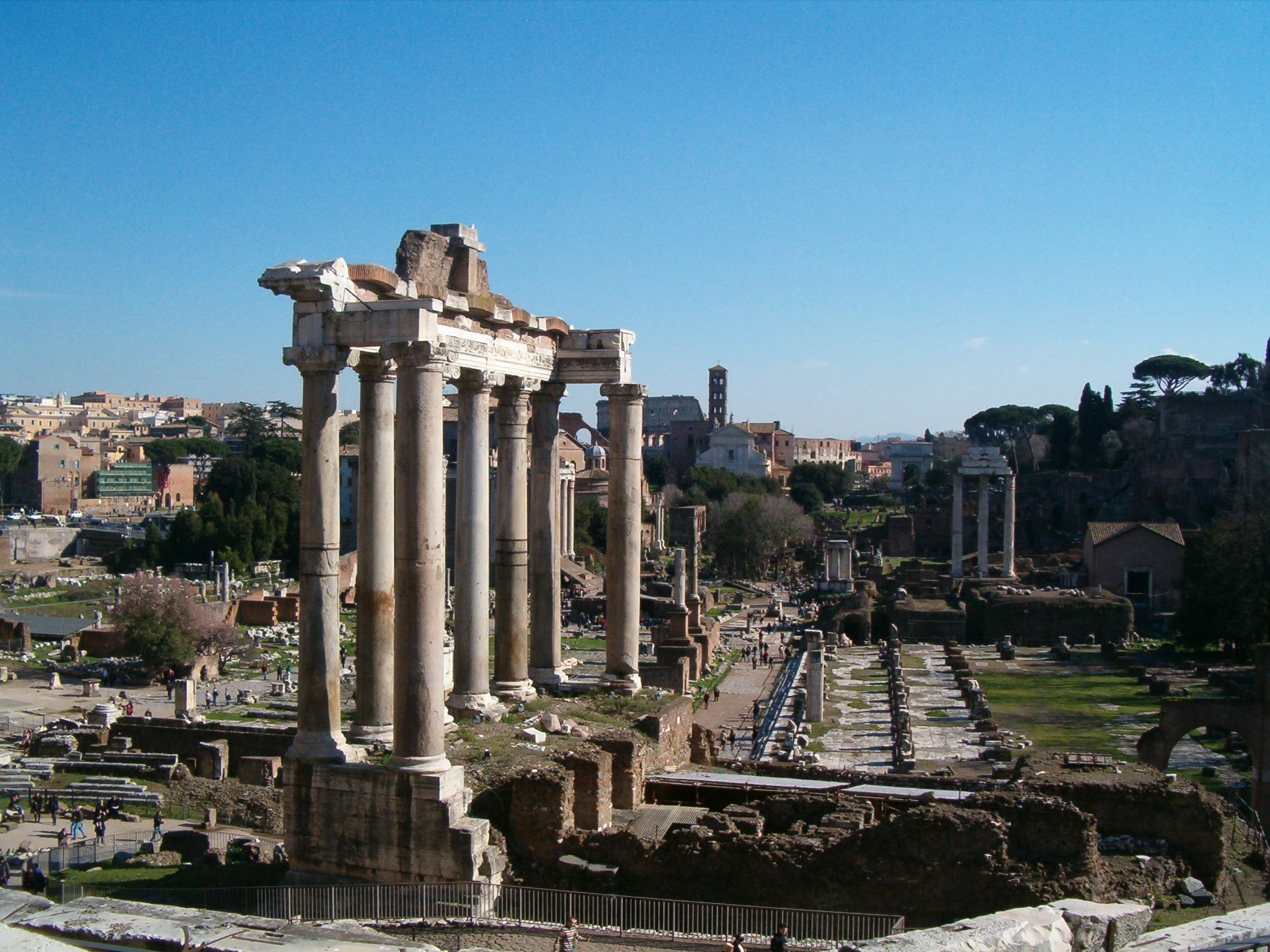
The Temple of Saturn, which housed the aerarium Saturni and the aerarium sanctum

After the censors had received the names of all the citizens with the amount of their property, they then had to make out the lists of the tribes, and also of the classes and centuries; for by the legislation of Servius Tullius the position of each citizen in the state was determined by the amount of his property (Comitia Centuriata). These lists formed a most important part of the Tabulae Censoriae, under which name were included all the documents connected in any way with the discharge of the censors' duties. These lists, insofar as they were connected with the finances of the state, were deposited in the aerarium, located in the Temple of Saturn; but the regular depository for all the archives of the censors was in earlier times the Atrium Libertatis, near the Villa publica, and in later times the temple of the Nymphs.

In addition to the division of the citizens into tribes, centuries, and classes, the censors had the power to confirm or revise the list of senators, striking out the names of such as they considered unworthy, and making additions to the body from those who were qualified. In the same manner, they held a review of the equites who received a horse from public funds (equites equo publico), and added and removed names as they judged proper. They also confirmed the princeps senatus, or appointed a new one. The princeps himself had to be a former censor. After the lists had been completed, the number of citizens was counted up, and the sum total announced. Accordingly, we find that in the account of a census, the number of citizens is likewise usually given. They are in such cases spoken of as capita ("heads"), sometimes with the addition of the word civium ("of the citizens"), and sometimes not. Hence, to be registered in the census was the same thing as "having a head" (caput habere).

==== Census beyond Rome ====
A census was sometimes taken in the provinces, even under the Republic. The emperor sent into the provinces special officers called censitores to take the census; but the duty was sometimes discharged by the Imperial legati. The censitores were assisted by subordinate officers, called censuales, who made out the lists, etc. In Rome, the census was still taken under the Empire, but the old ceremonies connected with it were no longer performed, and the ceremony of the lustratio was not performed after the time of Vespasian. The jurists Paulus and Ulpian each wrote works on the census in the imperial period; and several extracts from these works are given in a chapter in the Digest (50 15).

==== Other uses of census ====
The word census, besides the conventional meaning of "valuation" of a person's estate, has other meaning in Rome; it could refer to:

- the amount of a person's property (hence we read of census senatorius, the estate of a senator; census equestris, the estate of an eques).
- the lists of the censors.
- the tax which depended upon the valuation in the census. The Lexicons will supply examples of these meanings.

=== Regimen morum ===
Keeping the public morals (regimen morum, or in the Empire cura morum or praefectura morum) was the second most important branch of the censors' duties, and the one which caused their office to be one of the most revered and the most dreaded; hence they were also known as castigatores ("chastisers"). It naturally grew out of the right which they possessed of excluding persons from the lists of citizens; for, as has been well remarked, "they would, in the first place, be the sole judges of many questions of fact, such as whether a citizen had the qualifications required by law or custom for the rank which he claimed, or whether he had ever incurred any judicial sentence, which rendered him infamous: but from thence the transition was easy, according to Roman notions, to the decisions of questions of right; such as whether a citizen was really worthy of retaining his rank, whether he had not committed some act as justly degrading as those which incurred the sentence of the law."

In this manner, the censors gradually assumed at least nominal complete superintendence over the whole public and private life of every citizen. They were constituted as the conservators of public morality; they were not simply to prevent crime or particular acts of immorality, but rather to maintain the traditional Roman character, ethics, and habits (mos majorum)—regimen morum also encompassed this protection of traditional ways, which was called in the times of the Empire cura ("supervision") or praefectura ("command"). The punishment inflicted by the censors in the exercise of this branch of their duties was called nota ("mark, letter") or notatio, or animadversio censoria ("censorial reproach"). In inflicting it, they were guided only by their conscientious convictions of duty; they had to take an oath that they would act biased by neither partiality nor favour; and, in addition to this, they were bound in every case to state in their lists, opposite the name of the guilty citizen, the cause of the punishment inflicted on him, subscriptio censoria.

This part of the censors' office invested them with a peculiar kind of jurisdiction, which in many respects resembled the exercise of public opinion in modern times; for there are innumerable actions which, though acknowledged by everyone to be prejudicial and immoral, still do not come within the reach of the positive laws of a country; as often said, "immorality does not equal illegality". Even in cases of real crimes, the positive laws frequently punish only the particular offence, while in public opinion the offender, even after he has undergone punishment, is still incapacitated for certain honours and distinctions which are granted only to persons of unblemished character.

Hence, the Roman censors might brand a man with their "censorial mark" (nota censoria) in case he had been convicted of a crime in an ordinary court of justice, and had already suffered punishment for it. The consequence of such a nota was only ignominia and not infamia. Infamia and the censorial verdict was not a judicium or res judicata, for its effects were not lasting, but might be removed by the following censors, or by a lex (roughly "law"). A censorial mark was moreover not valid unless both censors agreed. The ignominia was thus only a transitory reduction of status, which does not even appear to have deprived a magistrate of his office, and certainly did not disqualify persons labouring under it for obtaining a magistracy, for being appointed as judices by the praetor, or for serving in the Roman army. Mamercus Aemilius Mamercinus was thus, notwithstanding the reproach of the censors (animadversio censoria), made dictator.

A person might be branded with a censorial mark in a variety of cases, which it would be impossible to specify, as in a great many instances it depended upon the discretion of the censors and the view they took of a case; and sometimes even one set of censors would overlook an offence which was severely chastised by their successors. But the offences which are recorded to have been punished by the censors are of a threefold nature.

1. Such as occurred in the private life of individuals:
  1. Living in celibacy at a time when a person ought to be married to provide the state with citizens. The obligation of marrying was frequently impressed upon the citizens by the censors, and the refusal to fulfil it was punished with a fine (aes uxorium).
  2. The dissolution of matrimony or betrothment in an improper way, or for insufficient reasons.
  3. Improper conduct towards one's wife or children, as well as harshness or too great indulgence towards children, and disobedience of the latter towards their parents.
  4. Inordinate and luxurious mode of living, or an extravagant expenditure of money. A great many instances of this kind are recorded. At a later time the leges sumptuariae were made to check the growing love of luxuries.
  5. Neglect and carelessness in cultivating one's fields.
  6. Cruelty towards slaves or clients.
  7. The carrying on of a disreputable trade or occupation, such as acting in theatres.
  8. Legacy-hunting, defrauding orphans, etc.
2. Offences committed in public life, either in the capacity of a public officer or against magistrates,
  1. If a magistrate acted in a manner not befitting his dignity as an officer, if he was accessible to bribes, or forged auspices.
  2. Improper conduct towards a magistrate, or the attempt to limit his power or to abrogate a law which the censors thought necessary.
  3. Perjury.
  4. Neglect, disobedience, and cowardice of soldiers in the army.
  5. The keeping of the equus publicus (a horse kept by patrician equestrian militia at public expense) in bad condition.
3. A variety of actions or pursuits which were thought to be injurious to public morality, might be forbidden by an edict, and those who acted contrary to such edicts were branded with the nota and degraded. For an enumeration of the offences that might be punished by the censors with ignominia, see Niebuhr.

A person who had been branded with a nota censoria, might, if he considered himself wronged, endeavour to prove his innocence to the censors, and if he did not succeed, he might try to gain the protection of one of the censors, that he might intercede on his behalf.

==== Punishments ====
The punishments inflicted by the censors generally differed according to the station which a man occupied, though sometimes a person of the highest rank might suffer all the punishments at once, by being degraded to the lowest class of citizens. The punishments are generally divided into four classes:

1. Motio ("removal") or ejectio e senatu ("ejection from the Senate"), or the exclusion of a man from the ranks of senators. This punishment might either be a simple exclusion from the list of senators, or the person might at the same time be excluded from the tribes and degraded to the rank of an aerarian. The latter course seems to have been seldom adopted; the ordinary mode of inflicting the punishment was simply this: the censors in their new lists omitted the names of such senators as they wished to exclude, and in reading these new lists in public, quietly omitted the names of those who were no longer to be senators. Hence the expression praeteriti senatores ("senators passed over") is equivalent to e senatu ejecti (those removed from the Senate). In some cases, however, the censors did not acquiesce to this simple mode of proceeding, but addressed the senator whom they had noted, and publicly reprimanded him for his conduct. As in ordinary cases an ex-senator was not disqualified by his ignominia for holding any of the magistracies which opened the way to the Senate, he might at the next census again become a senator.
2. The ademptio equi, or taking away of the publicly funded horse from an equestrian. This punishment might likewise be simple, or combined with the exclusion from the tribes and the degradation to the rank of an aerarian.
3. The motio e tribu, or the exclusion of a person from his tribe. This punishment and the degradation to the rank of an aerarian were originally the same, but when in the course of time a distinction was made between the rural or rustic tribes and the urban tribes, the motio e tribu transferred a person from the rustic tribes to the less respectable city tribes, and if the further degradation to the rank of an aerarian was combined with the motio e tribu, it was always expressly stated.
4. The fourth punishment was called referre in aerarios or facere aliquem aerarium, and might be inflicted on any person who was thought by the censors to deserve it. This degradation, properly speaking, included all the other punishments, for an equestrian could not be made an aerarius unless he was previously deprived of his horse, nor could a member of a rustic tribe be made an aerarius unless he was previously excluded from it.

It was this authority of the Roman censors which eventually developed into the modern meaning of "censor" and "censorship"—i.e., officials who review published material and forbid the publication of material judged to be contrary to "public morality" as the term is interpreted in a given political and social environment.

=== Administration of the finances of the state ===
The administration of the state's finances was another part of the censors' office. In the first place the tributum, or property-tax, had to be paid by each citizen according to the amount of his property registered in the census, and, accordingly, the regulation of this tax naturally fell under the jurisdiction of the censors. They also had the superintendence of all the other revenues of the state, the vectigalia, such as the tithes paid for the public lands, the salt works, the mines, the customs, etc.

The censors typically auctioned off to the highest bidder for the space of a lustrum the collection of the tithes and taxes (tax farming). This auctioning was called venditio or locatio, and seems to have taken place in the month of March, in a public place in Rome The terms on which they were let, together with the rights and duties of the purchasers, were all specified in the leges censoriae, which the censors published in every case before the bidding commenced. For further particulars see Publicani.

The censors also possessed the right, though probably not without the assent of the Senate, of imposing new vectigalia, and even of selling the land belonging to the state. It would thus appear that it was the duty of the censors to bring forward a budget for a five-year period, and to take care that the income of the state was sufficient for its expenditure during that time. In part, their duties resembled those of a modern minister of finance. The censors, however, did not receive the revenues of the state. All the public money was paid into the aerarium, which was entirely under the jurisdiction of the Senate; and all disbursements were made by order of this body, which employed the quaestors as its officers.

==== Overseeing public works ====
In one important department, the public works, the censors were entrusted with the expenditure of the public money (though the actual payments were no doubt made by the quaestors).

The censors had the general superintendence of all the public buildings and works (opera publica), and to meet the expenses connected with this part of their duties, the Senate voted them a certain sum of money or certain revenues, to which they were restricted, but which they might at the same time employ according to their discretion. They had to see that the temples and all other public buildings were in a good state of repair, that no public places were encroached upon by the occupation of private persons, and that the aqueducts, roads, drains, etc. were properly attended to.

The repairs of the public works and the keeping of them in proper condition were let out by the censors by public auction to the lowest bidder, just as the vectigalia were let out to the highest bidder. These expenses were called ultrotributa, and hence we frequently find vectigalia and ultrotributa contrasted with one another. The persons who undertook the contract were called conductores, mancipes, redemptores, susceptores, etc., and the duties they had to discharge were specified in the Leges Censoriae. The censors had also to superintend the expenses connected with the worship of the gods, even for instance the feeding of the sacred geese in the Capitol; these various tasks were also let out on contract. It was ordinary for censors to expend large amounts of money (“by far the largest and most extensive” of the state) in their public works.

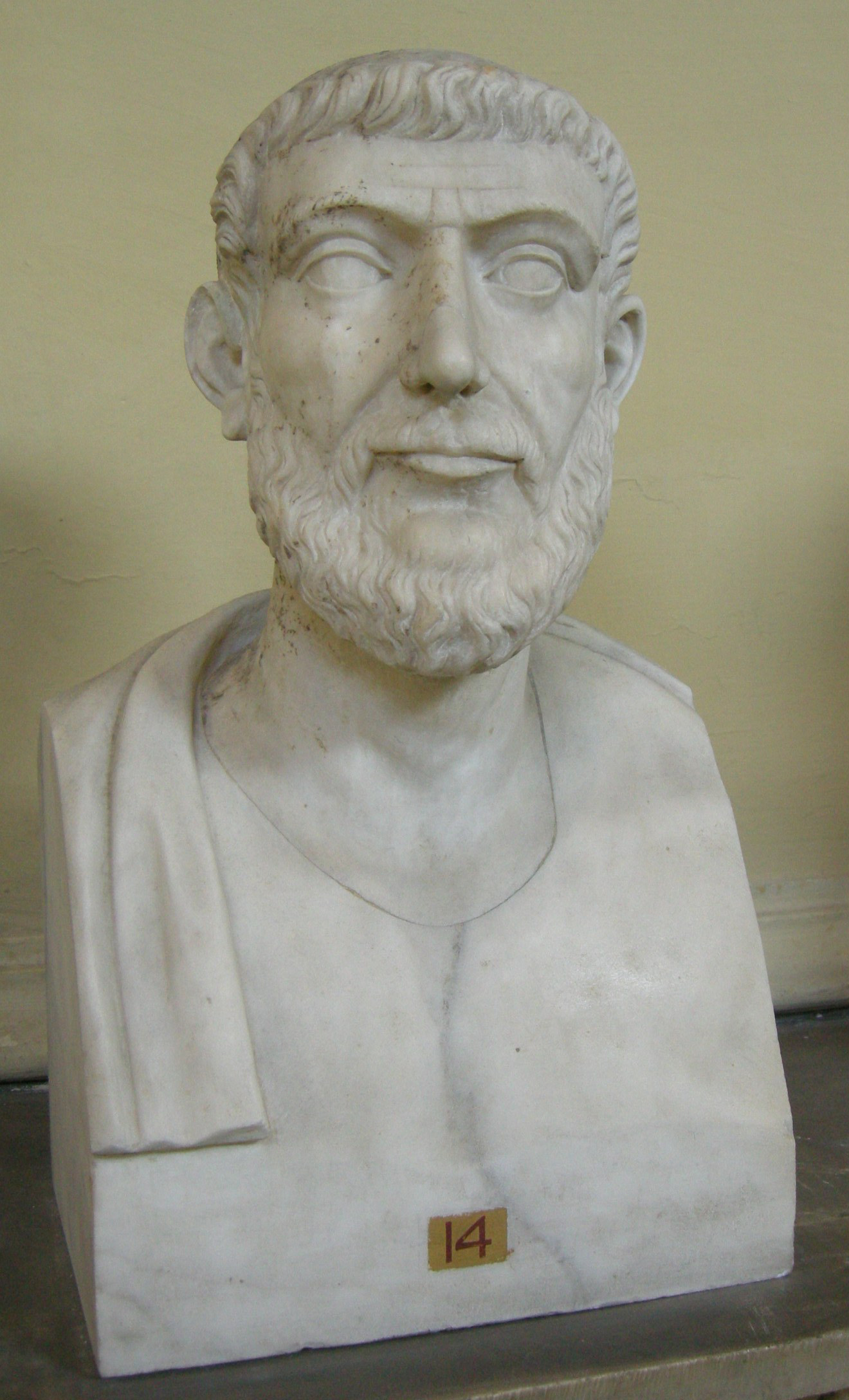
Appius Claudius Caecus, one of the most influential censors

Besides keeping existing public buildings and facilities in a proper state of repair, the censors were also in charge of constructing new ones, either for ornament or utility, both in Rome and in other parts of Italy, such as temples, basilicae, theatres, porticoes, fora, aqueducts, town walls, harbours, bridges, cloacae, roads, etc. These works were either performed by them jointly, or they divided between them the money, which had been granted to them by the Senate. They were let out to contractors, like the other works mentioned above, and when they were completed, the censors had to see that the work was performed in accordance with the contract: this was called opus probare or in acceptum referre.

The first ever Roman road, the Via Appia, and the first Roman aqueduct, the Aqua Appia, were all constructed under the censorship of Appius Claudius Caecus, one of the most influential censors.

The aediles had likewise a superintendence over the public buildings, and it is not easy to define with accuracy the respective duties of the censors and aediles, but it may be remarked in general that the superintendence of the aediles had more of a police character, while that of the censors were more financial in subject matter.

=== Lustrum ===
After the censors had performed their various duties and taken the five-yearly census, the lustrum, a solemn purification of the people, followed. When the censors entered upon their office, they drew lots to see which of them should perform this purification; but both censors were of course obliged to be present at the ceremony.

Long after the Roman census was no longer taken, the Latin word lustrum has survived, and been adopted in some modern languages, in the derived sense of a period of five years, i.e., half a decennium.

== Census statistics ==
Census	Number of Roman citizens	Economic crises	Wars	Epidemics
508 BC	130,000			
		505–504 BC		
503 BC	120,000			
		499 or 496 BC		
498 BC	150,700			
493 BC	110,000			
		492–491 BC		
		486 BC		
474 BC	103,000	474 BC	474 BC	
465 BC	104,714			
459 BC	117,319			
		456 BC		
		454 BC		454 BC
		440–439 BC		
		433 BC		433 BC
		428 BC		428 BC
		412 BC		412 BC
			400 BC	
			396 BC	
392 BC	152,573	392 BC		392 BC
390 BC		390 BC		
			387 BC	
		383 BC		383 BC
			343–341 BC	
340 BC	165,000		340–338 BC	
			326–304 BC	
323 BC	150,000			
		299 BC		
			298–290 BC	
294 BC	262,321			
				293/292 BC
289 BC	272,200			
			284 BC	
280 BC	287,222		281–275 BC	
276 BC	271,224			276 BC?
265 BC	292,234			
			264–241 BC	
252 BC	297,797			
		250 BC	250 BC	
247 BC	241,712			
241 BC	260,000			
234 BC	270,713			
		216 BC	216 BC	
		211–210 BC	211 BC	
209 BC	137,108			
204 BC	214,000	204 BC		
		203 BC		
		201 BC		
		200 BC	200–196 BC	
194 BC	143,704			
			192–188 BC	
189 BC	258,318			
				187 BC
				182–180 BC
179 BC	258,318			
				176–175 BC
174 BC	269,015			
			171–168 BC	
169 BC	312,805			
				165 BC
164 BC	337,022			
159 BC	328,316			
154 BC	324,000			
		153 BC		
147 BC	322,000			
142 BC	322,442			142 BC
		138 BC		
136 BC	317,933			
131 BC	318,823			
125 BC	394,736			
		123 BC		
115 BC	394,336			
		104 BC		
				87 BC
86 BC	463,000			
			80- 72 BC	
70 BC	910,000			
		67 BC		
		65 BC		
			53 BC	
			49– 45 BC	
		43 BC		
28 BC	4,063,000			
		23–22	23–22	
8 BC	4,233,000			
			5–6	
			10	
14 AD	4,937,000			

== See also ==
- Authoritarianism
- Birth registration in Ancient Rome
- Cursus honorum
- Lex Caecilia de censoria
- Outline of ancient Rome
- Political institutions of Rome
- Pauly–Wissowa
