= Grania gens =

Ancient Roman family

The gens Grania was a plebeian family at ancient Rome. Although none of them ever obtained the consulship, the family was of "senatorial rank", (Note: Also called "senatorian", an unofficial elite within the equestrian order during the later Republic, consisting of the senators and their offspring who were not patricians.) and was well known from the latter half of the second century BC. In Imperial times, a number of them became distinguished in military and provincial service.

== Origin ==
The Granii may have originated at Puteoli, where a Roman colony was established in 194 BC, although it is not known whether the ancestors of the gens were among the original colonists, or natives of the town who acquired Roman citizenship.

== Praenomina ==
The Granii of the Republic used the praenomina Quintus, Gnaeus, Gaius, Publius, and Aulus, all of which were common names throughout Roman history.

== Branches and cognomina ==
The only cognomen of the Granii under the Republic was Flaccus, in the time of Caesar. In imperial times, the surnames Licinianus, Marcellus, Marcianus, Serenus, and Silvanus are found.

== Members ==
This list includes abbreviated praenomina. For an explanation of this practice, see filiation.

- Quintus Granius, for many years a humble auction clerk at Rome, whose name became a by-word for wit and biting humour. His puns and verbal jabs at many of Rome's leading citizens, including Lucius Licinius Crassus the orator, the consul Publius Cornelius Scipio Nasica, the famous tribune of the plebs Marcus Livius Drusus, poet and statesman Quintus Lutatius Catulus, and the orator Marcus Antonius became the subject of numerous anecdotes by the satirist Lucilius, and later Cicero.
- Quintus Granius, a step-son of Gaius Marius. He and his brother, Gnaeus, were outlawed by Sulla when he occupied Rome in 88 BC. One of them accompanied Marius in his flight, and became separated from him near Minturnae. Escaping to the island of Aenaria, he later accompanied Marius to Africa.
- Gnaeus Granius, (Note: His existence is poorly attested. Appian mentions "Gnaeus and Quintus Granius" among the men whom Sulla outlawed in 88 BC, but elsewhere mentions only one (without specifying praenomen), and Plutarch is only aware of a single Granius. Münzer suggests that Appian mistook the former for Gnaeus Papirius Carbo, who, as a staunch enemy of Sulla later on, could be plausibly identified as one of the outlaws in 88.) a step-son of Marius. It is not certain whether it was he, or his brother, Quintus, who accompanied Marius on his flight from Rome in 88 BC.
- Gaius Granius, a dramatic poet of an uncertain age. According to Nonius, he was the author of a tragedy called Peliades.
- Granius, a decurion at Puteoli in 78 BC, who resisted imposing Sulla's levy on the municipia, intended to restore the Capitol at Rome, which had been burnt five years earlier during the civil war between Sulla and the supporters of Marius. News of Sulla's death was expected at any time, but instead, Sulla summoned Granius to his house at Cumae, where he ordered the decurion to be strangled in his presence.
- Publius Granius, a merchant from Puteoli who traded at Sicily. He gave evidence against Verres.
- Aulus Granius, an officer in Caesar's army, killed at Dyrrachium in 48 BC. He was a man of equestrian rank, and hailed from Puteoli.
- Granius Flaccus, a scholar of ancient Roman laws and religious rites, which he collected in a work called De Jure Papiriano, and perhaps also in De Indigitamentis, although these may have been different names for the same work. He was a contemporary of Caesar, to whom De Indigitamentis was dedicated.
- Granius Licinianus, the author of Fasti, a Latin work quoted by Macrobius. In the second book of Fasti, he described a sacrifice performed by the Flaminica Dialis, and thus he is probably the same Granius whom Festus cites for the meaning of the word rica, a sacred cloth worn by the Flaminica.
- Granius Marcellus, praetor of Bithynia during the reign of Tiberius, he was accused of treason and extortion. He was acquitted of the former charge, but convicted of extortion and fined.
- Quintus Granius, accused Lucius Calpurnius Piso of various plots against Tiberius in AD 24, and secured his conviction.
- Granius Marcianus, a senator accused of majestas by Gaius Sempronius Gracchus in AD 35; he took his own life rather than face execution.
- Granius Silvanus, (Note: "Gavius Silvanus" in some editions of Tacitus.) a praetorian tribune in AD 65, he was sent by the emperor Nero to question Seneca, after the discovery of the conspiracy of Piso. In fact, Silvanus was one of the conspirators, but acquitted, while Seneca was probably not involved, but the emperor ordered the philosopher to kill himself, and Silvanus chose to do the same.
- Granius Serenus, a legate of Hadrian in Asia, wrote to the emperor concerning the execution of Christians who had not been charged with or convicted of any crime. In response, the emperor ordered Gaius Minicius Fundanus, the governor of Asia, not to condemn any Christian who had not been convicted of a crime.

== See also ==
- List of Roman gentes

== Bibliography ==
- Marcus Tullius Cicero, Epistulae ad Familiares, Pro Plancio (Scholia Bobiensa, ed. Orelli), Brutus, Epistulae ad Atticum, De Oratore, In Verrem.
- Gaius Julius Caesar, Commentarii de Bello Civili (Commentary on the Civil War).
- Valerius Maximus, Factorum ac Dictorum Memorabilium (Memorable Facts and Sayings).
- Publius Cornelius Tacitus, Annales.
- Plutarchus, Lives of the Noble Greeks and Romans.
- Appianus Alexandrinus (Appian), Bellum Civile (The Civil War).
- Sextus Pompeius Festus, Epitome of De Verborum Significatu (On the Meaning of Words).
- Eusebius of Caesarea, Historia Ecclesiastica (History of the Church).
- Paulus Orosius, Historiarum Adversum Paganos (History against the Pagans).
- Macrobius Ambrosius Theodosius, Saturnalia.
- Friedrich Heinrich Bothe, Poetae Scenici Latinorum, Halberst (1822).
- Dictionary of Greek and Roman Biography and Mythology, William Smith, ed., Little, Brown and Company, Boston (1849).
- August Pauly; Georg Wissowa; Wilhelm Kroll; Kurt Witte; Karl Mittelhaus; Konrat Ziegler, eds. (1894–1980). Paulys Realencyclopädie der classischen Altertumswissenschaft. Stuttgart: J. B. Metzler.
