= Papiria gens =

Ancient Roman family

The gens Papiria was a patrician family at ancient Rome. According to tradition, the Papirii had already achieved prominence in the time of the kings, and the first Rex Sacrorum and Pontifex Maximus of the Republic were members of this gens. Lucius Papirius Mugillanus was the first of the Papirii to obtain the consulship in 444 BC. The patrician members of the family regularly occupied the highest offices of the Roman state down to the time of the Punic Wars. Their most famous member was Lucius Papirius Cursor, five times consul between 326 and 313 BC, who earned three triumphs during the Samnite Wars. Most of the Papirii who held office under the later Republic belonged to various plebeian branches of the family. Although the most illustrious Papirii flourished in the time of the Republic, a number of the family continued to hold high office during the first two centuries of the Empire.

== Origin ==
Cicero described the history of the Papirii to his friend, Papirius Paetus, a plebeian member of the family, who was unaware of the patrician origin of the family. According to Cicero, the Papirii were one of the gentes minores, the lesser of two divisions made amongst the patrician gentes at Rome. The gentes maiores were the greatest or most noble patrician houses, while the rest of the patrician families made up the gentes minores. The precise distinction between the two divisions is not known, nor have any lists of the families belonging to each survived from antiquity. However, it has been suggested that the gentes maiores consisted, at least in part, of the families who came to Rome in the time of Romulus, while the gentes minores consisted of the patrician families that were enrolled after the destruction of Alba Longa, or under the Tarquins.

The original form of the nomen Papirius was Papisius, and all of the early Papirii would have been known by this name, although in later times they were always referred to as Papirii. A number of other ancient nomina experienced the same evolution; Fusius becoming Furius, Valesius becoming Valerius, and Vetusius becoming Veturius. Cicero writes that the first of the Papirii to adopt the "modern" spelling was Lucius Papirius Crassus, consul in BC 336.

== Praenomina ==
The chief praenomina of the Papirii during the Republic were Lucius, Marcus, Gaius, Manius, and Spurius. The first three were the most common of all Roman names, while Manius and Spurius were much more distinctive. The only other praenomina found among the patrician Papirii are Tiberius, and perhaps Sextus or Publius, known from individual instances, but only Publius is known from the other members of the gens. The plebeian Papirii Carbones used primarily Gaius and Gnaeus; this last was a common name not found among the ancient patrician stirpes, but which was still used by the Papirii of imperial times.

== Branches and cognomina ==
From at least the time of the early Republic, the Papirii are divided into a number of branches, or stirpes, distinguished by their surnames. Cicero lists the patrician cognomina of the Papirii as Crassus, Cursor, Maso, and Mugillanus, while the plebeian families included those of Carbo, Paetus, and Turdus.

The Papirii Mugillani were the first of these families to obtain the consulship. Their surname was derived from an ancient city of Latium known as Mugilla, the ancestral home of the Papirii. According to Dionysius of Halicarnassus, Mugilla was conquered by Coriolanus after he was banished from Rome and went over to the Volsci. It must have been in the vicinity of the Volscian towns of Pollusca and Corioli, but it was evidently deserted at a very early date, as Pliny does not mention it among his list of former cities in Latium.

The Papirii Crassi appear almost simultaneously with the Mugillani, and remained a distinct family down to the Second Samnite War. Their surname, Crassus, which means "thick" or "fat", was common to a number of prominent gentes, including the Claudii and the Licinii.

Cursor, the surname of the third branch of the Papirii to achieve prominence, means "a runner", and was probably bestowed upon the dictator Lucius Papirius Cursor because of his speed. The Papirii Cursores appear in history from the early fourth century BC to the beginning of the third. The Cursores likely descended from the Mugillani, as Lucius Papirius Cursor, the dictator, is sometimes found with this cognomen. Friedrich Münzer writes that he was the first named Cursor, and his grandfather—the first with this name in the sources—actually bore the cognomen Mugillanus.

The surname Maso, sometimes spelled Masso, is derived from the Latin massa, a "mass" or "lump". The Papirii Masones were the last of the distinct patrician families of this gens, although some of the other Papirii were also patricians, including Lucius Papirius Praetextatus, censor in 272 BC. The Masones occur from the end of the fourth century BC down to the time of Cicero.

Among the plebeian branches of the Papiria gens, the most important was that surnamed Carbo, referring to a piece of coal or charcoal; metaphorically, something black, or of little value. The Papirii Carbones appear in the first half of the second century BC, and continued down to the time of Cicero.

Paetus, the surname of Cicero's plebeian friend, referred to a mild defect of vision, variously described as "blink-eyed", or "squinty". This common cognomen implied a lesser deficit than Strabo, "squinty", Luscus, "one-eyed", or Caecus, "blind", and could even be regarded as endearing; it was an epithet of Venus.

Cicero describes the Papirii Turdi as a plebeian family, although only one of them is mentioned in history: Gaius Papirius Turdus, tribune of the plebs in 177 BC. Their surname signified a thrush.

== Members ==
This list includes abbreviated praenomina. For an explanation of this practice, see filiation.

- Sextus Papirius, (Note: Or Publius.) collected the leges regiae, the laws of the Roman kings, which came to be known as the Ius Papirianum, (Note: Or Jus (Civile) Papirianum.) during the reign of Tarquinius Superbus. (Note: Or Tarquinius Priscus; Pomponius describes the king as "the son of Demaratus", which would refer to the elder Tarquin.)
- Gaius Papirius, Pontifex Maximus in 509 BC, collected the religious ordinances of Numa Pompilius, which Ancus Marcius had carved on oaken tablets, and placed in the Roman Forum. (Note: Münzer hypothesizes that the references to Sextus or Publius Papirius collecting the leges regiae in fact refer to Gaius Papirius, the Pontifex Maximus, who would then be the author of the Ius Papirianum.)
- Manius Papirius, appointed the first Rex Sacrorum in 509 BC, in order to carry out the religious duties that had previously been performed by the king.
- Lucius Papirius, a creditor, who accepted a boy, Gaius Publilius, as nexus, or collateral for his father's debt, in 326 BC. When his lustful advances toward the boy were rejected, Papirius caused the boy to be stripped and lashed; popular outrage led to the abolition of nexum by a law ironically named the lex Poetelia Papiria, after the consuls Gaius Poetelius Libo and Lucius Papirius Cursor.
- Lucius Papirius L. f. M. n. Praetextatus, (Note: Frontinus calls him Lucius Papirius Cursor, which some scholars have accepted, equating him with a brother of the consul of the same year, on the grounds that Praetextatus, named in the Capitoline Fasti, had not yet been consul. Broughton, following Degrassi, favours Praetextatus, noting that the censors of 318, 312, 209, and perhaps of 265 had not previously held the consulship. He suggests that Frontinus confused the censor with the consul.) censor in 272 BC, died in office.
- Lucius Papirius, a contemporary of Tiberius Sempronius Gracchus, father of the Gracchi. Cicero considered Papirius among the finest orators of his age, and mentions a speech that Papirius gave in the senate on behalf of the people of Fregellae and the Latin colonies.
- Papirius Potamo, a scriba and friend of Quintus Caecilius Niger, the quaestor of Verres, who became his employer when Caecilius left Sicily. Potamo became one of those through whom Verres worked his depredations upon the people, and was derided by Cicero for his role.
- Lucius Papirius Paetus, a friend of Cicero, who describes him as a learned man, and an Epicurean. He possessed little knowledge of his family, and did not realize that the Papirii were of patrician origin. In one letter, Cicero undertook to enlighten him, extolling the virtues of his patrician ancestors, whom he encouraged Paetus to emulate, while denigrating the follies of the plebeians.

=== Papirii Mugillani et Cursores ===
- Lucius Papirius Mugillanus, was elected consul suffectus in 444 BC, the year in which the first college of consular tribunes was obliged to resign due to a fault in the auspices. The following year, he was one of the first censors, together with Lucius Sempronius Atratinus, his colleague in the consulship.
- Lucius Papirius L. f. Mugillanus, (Note: Some authorities regard the consul of 427 as the same Lucius Papirius who had been consul in 444, and the consular tribune of 422 as his son. The strongest argument against this is that there is no indication in the Fasti that the consul of 427 had previously held the office.) consul in 427 BC, and consular tribune in 422. As interrex for holding the comitia in 420 BC, he authored a law permitting the election of plebeian quaestors. He was censor in 418.
- Marcus Papirius Mugillanus, consular tribune in 418 and 416 BC, and perhaps consul in 411.
- Lucius Papirius Mugillanus, (Note: Some authorities consider the consular tribune of 382 BC to have been Lucius Papirius Crassus. Broughton thinks it more likely he was the Lucius Papirius Mugillanus who held the office for a second time in 380, as the date of his first tribunate would not otherwise be accounted for. However, he notes that there must have been a Lucius Papirius Crassus in this generation, even if he is not to be identified with the consular tribune of 382.) consular tribune in 382, 380, and 376 BC.
- Lucius Papirius (Mugillanus), censor in 393 BC, and consular tribune in 387 and 385. (Note: Lucius Papirius Mugillanus according to Münzer.)
- Spurius Papirius L. f. (Mugillanus), father of the dictator Lucius Papirius Cursor.
- Lucius Papirius Sp. f. L. n. Cursor, was appointed magister equitum by his cousin, the dictator Lucius Papirius Crassus, in 340 BC. He was consul in 326, the first year of the Second Samnite War, and was nominated dictator the following year, in which he earned a triumph. (Note: In the Capitoline Fasti, no consuls are given for 324, and the Chronography of 354 explicitly states that none were elected, but that the dictator and magister equitum continued in office. This was the second of four "dictator years" occurring during the late fourth century BC, the authenticity of which has often been doubted, but which cannot actually be disproved. The others were 333, 309 (when Cursor is again said to have continued as dictator), and 301. See Broughton, vol. I, pp. 141, 148, 163, 171.) Consul again in 320 and 319, he earned a second triumph. He was consul twice more, in 315 and 313, and dictator for a second time in 310, following which he received a third triumph. (Note: Broughton doubts the authenticity of these victories.) (Note: Lucius Papirius Mugillanus Cursor according to Münzer.)
- Lucius Papirius L. f. S. n. Cursor, consul in 293 BC, during the Third Samnite War, together with his colleague, Spurius Carvilius Maximus, won several important victories and celebrated a triumph. The two were elected again in 272, during an insurrection in southern Italy, and obtained a second triumph over the Samnites, Lucani, and Bruttii. During his first consulship, Papirius is said to have erected the first public sundial at Rome.

=== Papirii Crassi ===
- Manius Papirius Crassus, (Note: Livy gives his praenomen as Marcus, but Diodorus gives Manius, which seems more probable given the frequency with which less common praenomina were changed into more common ones as a result of scribal error.) consul in 441 BC.
- Lucius Papirius Crassus, consul in 436 BC, carried on the war against Veii and Falerii. As the enemy refused to engage, Papirius and his colleague laid waste to the countryside around those cities. Papirius was censor in 430.
- Gaius Papirius Crassus, consul in 430 BC. (Note: Diodorus Siculus gives his name as Gaius, but Livy calls him Lucius, and Cicero Publius. Some authorities consider him the same as Lucius Papirius Crassus, the consul of 436. However, the censor of 430 was also named Lucius Papirius. He does not seem to be one of the Mugillani, as the elder Lucius Mugillanus is supposed to have been one of the first censors in 443, and the younger in 418; there is no indication that either of them held the office twice (but some scholars doubt whether the censorship was instituted in 443; if this date is inaccurate, it remains possible that the elder Mugillanus was the censor of 430). If the censor was not the elder Lucius Mugillanus, then he would seem to be either one of the Crassi, or an otherwise unknown Lucius Papirius. The consul of 430 cannot be the same man as the censor, suggesting that Diodorus is correct, and that the consul of this year was Gaius, rather than Lucius.) He and his colleague anticipated a popular law planned by the tribunes of the plebs, and passed it themselves.
- Lucius Papirius Crassus, grandfather of the consular tribune of 336 and 330 BC.
- Gaius Papirius Crassus, consular tribune in 384 BC.
- Spurius Papirius C. f. Crassus, consular tribune in 382 BC, fought successfully against the armies of Velitrae and Praeneste.
- Tiberius Papirius Crassus, consular tribune in 380 BC.
- Marcus Papirius Crassus, grandfather of the consul of 318 BC.
- Lucius Papirius L. f. Crassus, father of the consular tribune of 336 and 330 BC. Some authorities describe a Lucius Papirius Crassus of this generation as consular tribune in 382 and 376 BC, but that Papirius was probably one of the Mugillani.
- Lucius Papirius S. f. C. n. Crassus, consular tribune in 368 BC.
- Lucus Papirius M. f. Crassus, father of the censor of 318 BC.
- Lucius Papirius L. f. L. n Crassus, nominated dictator in 340 BC, to carry on the war against Antium. He was consul in 336, and fought against the Ausones at Cales. Consul for the second time in 330 BC, he defeated Vitruvius Flaccus of Privernum. In 325, he was praefectus urbi.
- Marcus Papirius L. f. L. n. Crassus, appointed dictator in 332 BC, amid panic over a Gallic invasion; but the rumoured invasion never materialized.
- Lucius Papirius L. f. M. n., censor in 318 BC.

=== Papirii Masones ===
- Lucius Papirius Maso, aedile circa 312 BC.
- Gaius Papirius L. f. Maso, father of the consul of 231 BC.
- Gaius Papirius C. f. L. n. Maso, consul in 231 BC, defeated the Corsicans, and used the spoils of war to dedicate a temple of Fontus. Refused a triumph by the senate, he became the first victorious general to celebrate one outside the city of Rome, which he did on the Alban mount. Maso was a pontifex, and was known for wearing a wreath of myrtle rather than one of laurel.
- Gaius Papirius Maso, according to Livy, one of the triumviri appointed in 218 BC to establish colonies at Placentia and Cremona in Cisalpine Gaul.
- Gaius Papirius L. f. Maso, one of the decemviri sacris faciundis, who died in 213 BC. He might perhaps be the same as the triumvir of 218.
- Lucius Papirius Maso, praetor urbanus in 176 BC, was perhaps the same as the Lucius Papirius, who when praetor, established that a child born within thirteen months of its possible conception could be recognized among a man's heirs.
- Marcus Papirius Maso, the brother of Aelius Ligur, one of the tribunes of the plebs in 58 BC, who opposed Cicero's recall from exile. According to Cicero, Maso disinherited his brother for his stance. He may be the same as the eques Marcus Papirius who was a friend of Pompeius, and was slain by Publius Clodius Pulcher during his fatal encounter with Titus Annius Milo along the Appian Way.
- Gaius Papirius Maso, accused of repetundae (Note: Extorting money from those under his administration.) by Titus Coponius of Tibur. He was condemned, and Coponius rewarded with Roman citizenship.

=== Papirii Turdi ===
- Gaius Papirius Turdus, tribune of the plebs in 177 BC, together with his colleague, Aulus Licinius Nerva, charged the proconsul Aulus Manlius Vulso with maladministration in Istria, but their attempt to recall him was thwarted by Quintus Aelius, another tribune.
- Papirius C. f. Turdus, triumvir monetalis between 169 and 158 BC, was probably the son of Gaius Papirius Turdus, tribune of the plebs in 177 BC.

=== Papirii Carbones ===
- Gaius Papirius Carbo, praetor in 168 BC, received the province of Sardinia, but the senate asked him to remain at Rome, and oversee a number of judicial claims.
- Gaius Papirius C. f. Carbo, a friend and ally of the Gracchi. As tribune of the plebs in 131 BC, he passed two important reforms. He was accused of having murdered Scipio Aemilianus, but after the death of Gaius Gracchus, Carbo was elected consul for 120. He suddenly distanced himself from the policies of his former friends, and having alienated both sides, was left vulnerable to an accusation the following year. He took his own life rather than be condemned. (Note: It is not entirely clear what Carbo was accused of. Valerius Maximus states that he went into exile.)
- Gnaeus Papirius C. f. Carbo, triumvir monetalis in 121, and consul in 113 BC. Sent against the Cimbri, who had entered Italy and Illyricum, he was defeated, and subsequently accused by Marcus Antonius. Like his brother, he took his own life rather than face condemnation. (Note: Broughton mentions an account in which he was tried and acquitted in suspicious circumstances.)
- Marcus Papirius C. f. Carbo, triumvir monetalis in 122 BC, then praetor circa 114, was accused of corruption in Sicily, and condemned.
- Gnaeus Papirius Cn. f. C. n. Carbo, a partisan of Marius and Cinna, was consul in 85, 84 and 82 BC, fought unsuccessfully against Sulla and was put to death by Pompeius.
- Gaius Papirius C. f. C. n. Carbo Arvina, tribune of the plebs in 90 BC, described by Cicero as a distinguished and persuasive orator, and the only Papirius Carbo to be a good citizen. He was murdered at the senate house in 82 BC by the praetor Damasippus, a partisan of the younger Marius.
- Gaius Papirius (Cn. or M. f.) C. n. Carbo, tribune of the plebs in 89 BC, succeeded in passing a law providing for grants of citizenship to certain allies. Despite his family connection to the consul Gnaeus, Gaius joined the party of Sulla, and was murdered while besieging Volaterrae in 80 BC. (Note: Said by Granius Licinianus and Valerius Maximus to have been a brother of the consul Gnaeus Carbo, but implied by Cicero to have been a cousin instead. Cicero's evidence was accepted by Shackleton Bailey, who considered Gaius a son of Marcus Carbo.)
- Gnaeus Papirius (M. f.?) C. n. Carbo, brother of Gaius, the tribune in 89 BC, was an acquaintance of Cicero, who described him as a scoundrel. Manutius and Shackleton Bailey rejected his identity with the consul of 85 BC.
- Gaius Papirius Carbo, described by Cicero as the son of Rubria, and one of his friends, although he appears to have said this ironically.
- Gaius Papirius C. f. Carbo, a military tribune and quaestor pro praetore in the early Augustan period, was a senator by 31 BC. His wife was Antullia.

=== Papirii of imperial times ===
- Papirius Fabianus, an orator and philosopher in the time of the elder Seneca. He was a prolific writer, admired by the younger Seneca and Pliny the Elder.
- Papirius, a centurion, who had assisted in the murder of Lucius Clodius Macer in AD 68, was despatched by Gaius Licinius Mucianus to assassinate Calpurnius Piso Galerianus, the proconsul of Africa, in AD 70. Piso was warned in time to intercept Papirius, whom he questioned, and put to death.
- Papirius Fronto, a jurist who probably lived during the early second century. He is frequently cited by Marcian.
- Papirius Justus, a jurist who lived during the latter part of the second century. He collected the various constitutions issued by the emperors, and a number of fragments relating to the constitutions of Marcus Aurelius are preserved in the Digest.
- Gaius Papirius C. f. Masso, (Note: Despite his surname, Masso, he was probably not a direct descendant of the Papirii Masones, who were patricians, since he was plebeian aedile.) served as military tribune, plebeian aedile, quaesitor judex, and curator frumenti. He was married twice; his first wife was Ofania Quarta, and his second Statia Quinta.
- Papirius Rufus, procurator in Dacia.
- Gnaeus Papirius Aelianus, governor of Dacia from AD 132 to 133, and Britain circa 145 to 147.
- Gnaeus Papirius Aelianus, consul suffectus in AD 157.
- Gnaeus Papirius Aelianus, consul in AD 184.
- Papirius Dionysius, praefectus annonae in the time of Commodus. In AD 190, he intentionally worsened a grain shortage at Rome in order to bring about the downfall of the praetorian prefect Marcus Aurelius Cleander. His victory was short-lived, as he was one of the prominent men whom Commodus had murdered shortly thereafter.
- Marcus Papirius Candidus, a senator, and patronus of the colony at Canusium in AD 223.
- Saint Papirius, better known as Papylus, an early Christian physician, said to have been put to death together with his sister, Agathonice, and others at Pergamum, about AD 166. His feast day is April 13.

== See also ==
- List of Roman gentes

== Bibliography ==
- Marcus Tullius Cicero, Brutus, De Legibus, De Natura Deorum, De Oratore, De Republica, Divinatio in Quintum Caecilium, Epistulae ad Atticum, Epistulae ad Familiares, In Verrem, Laelius de Amicitia, Pro Archia Poeta, Pro Balbo, Pro Domo Sua, Pro Milone, Tusculanae Quaestiones.
- Diodorus Siculus, Bibliotheca Historica (Library of History).
- Dionysius of Halicarnassus, Romaike Archaiologia (Roman Antiquities).
- Titus Livius (Livy), History of Rome.
- Marcus Velleius Paterculus, Compendium of Roman History.
- Valerius Maximus, Factorum ac Dictorum Memorabilium (Memorable Facts and Sayings).
- Lucius Annaeus Seneca (Seneca the Elder), Controversiae, Suasoriae (Rhetorical Exercises).
- Lucius Annaeus Seneca (Seneca the Younger), Epistulae Morales ad Lucilium (Moral Letters to Lucilius), Naturales Quaestiones (Natural Questions).
- Gaius Plinius Secundus (Pliny the Elder), Naturalis Historia (Natural History).
- Sextus Julius Frontinus, De Aquaeductu (On Aqueducts), Strategemata (Stratagems).
- Lucius Mestrius Plutarchus (Plutarch), Lives of the Noble Greeks and Romans.
- Publius Cornelius Tacitus, Historiae, Dialogus de Oratoribus (Dialogue on Oratory).
- Appianus Alexandrinus (Appian), Bellum Civile (The Civil War).
- Granius Licinianus, Fasti.
- Cassius Dio, Roman History.
- Chronograph of 354.
- Sextus Aurelius Victor, De Viris Illustribus (On Famous Men).
- Eutropius, Breviarium Historiae Romanae (Abridgement of the History of Rome).
- Paulus Orosius, Historiarum Adversum Paganos (History Against the Pagans).
- Digesta seu Pandectae (The Digest).
- Paulus Diaconus, Epitome de Sex. Pompeio Festo de Significatu Verborum (Epitome of Festus' De Significatu Verborum).
- Joannes Zonaras, Epitome Historiarum (Epitome of History).
- Barthold Georg Niebuhr, The History of Rome, Julius Charles Hare and Connop Thirlwall, trans., John Smith, Cambridge (1828).
- Henricus Meyerus (Heinrich Meyer), Oratorum Romanorum Fragmenta ab Appio inde Caeco usque ad Q. Aurelium Symmachum (Fragments of Roman Orators from Appius Claudius Caecus to Quintus Aurelius Symmachus), L. Bourgeois-Mazé, Paris (1837).
- Dictionary of Greek and Roman Biography and Mythology, William Smith, ed., Little, Brown and Company, Boston (1849).
- Theodor Mommsen et alii, Corpus Inscriptionum Latinarum (The Body of Latin Inscriptions, abbreviated CIL), Berlin-Brandenburgische Akademie der Wissenschaften (1853–present).
- Dictionary of Greek and Roman Geography, William Smith, ed., Little, Brown and Company, Boston (1854).
- August Pauly, Georg Wissowa, Friedrich Münzer, et alii, Realencyclopädie der Classischen Altertumswissenschaft (Scientific Encyclopedia of the Knowledge of Classical Antiquities, abbreviated RE or PW), J. B. Metzler, Stuttgart (1894–1980).
- George Davis Chase, "The Origin of Roman Praenomina", in Harvard Studies in Classical Philology, vol. VIII (1897).
- Paul von Rohden, Elimar Klebs, & Hermann Dessau, Prosopographia Imperii Romani (The Prosopography of the Roman Empire, abbreviated PIR), Berlin (1898).
- Broughton, T. Robert S. (1952–1986). The Magistrates of the Roman Republic. American Philological Association.
- Michael Crawford, Roman Republican Coinage, Cambridge University Press (1974, 2001).
- Shackleton Bailey, D.R., ed. (1977). Cicero: Epistulae Ad Familiares, Volume II, 47–43 B.C. Cambridge University Press. ISBN 0-521-21152-2.
- John C. Traupman, The New College Latin & English Dictionary, Bantam Books, New York (1995).
- Stephen P. Oakley, A Commentary on Livy: Books VI–X, Volume I, Introduction and Book VI, Oxford University Press, 1997.
- ——, A Commentary on Livy: Books VI–X, Volume II, Books VI-VIII, Oxford University Press, 1998.
- ——, A Commentary on Livy: Books VI–X, Volume IV, Book X, Oxford University Press, 2005.
