= Poetelia gens =

Ancient Roman family

The gens Poetelia or Poetilia was a plebeian family at ancient Rome. Members of this gens are first mentioned in the time of the Decemvirs, and from thence down to the Second Punic War, they regularly held the chief magistracies of the Roman state. After this, however, they fade into obscurity, and are only occasionally mentioned. The nomen Poetelius is sometimes confused with Petillius, and can be found with either a single or double 'l'.

== Branches and cognomina ==
The only distinct family of the Poetelii is Libo, a sprinkler, probably referring to one who pours libations during a sacrifice. Most of this family also bore the surname Visolus. Livy refers to the consul of 360 BC as Gaius Poetelius Balbus, but other sources refer to him as Libo.

== Members ==
This list includes abbreviated praenomina. For an explanation of this practice, see filiation.

- Quintus Poetelius Libo Visolus, one of the plebeian members of the second decemvirate, which held power at Rome from 450 to 449 BC, before being overthrown.
- Gaius Poetelius Q. f. Libo Visolus, the father of Gaius Poetilius Libo Visolus, consul in 360 BC.
- Gaius Poetelius C. f. Q. n. Libo Visolus, consul in 360 BC, defeated the Tiburtines and the Gauls, and was awarded a triumph. As tribune of the plebs in 358, he had passed a law intended to curb ambitus (bribery). He was consul again in 346 and 326, (Note: The Capitoline Fasti are deficient during this period, and so it has been argued that the consul of 346 and 326 should be identified with the dictator of 313, rather than the consul of 360, and that a third consulship attributed to him might have occurred about 333, one of the enigmatic "dictator years".) and in the latter year passed the lex Poetelia Papiria, abolishing a form of debt bondage.
- Gaius Poetelius C. f. C. n. Libo Visolus, dictator in 313 BC, during the Second Samnite War, he had some success against the Samnites, but some authorities credit the consul, Gaius Junius Bubulcus Brutus. Niebuhr and Müller suggest that it was he, rather than his father, who brought forward the lex Poetelia Papiria.
- Marcus Poetelius M. f. M. n. Libo, consul in 314 BC, and magister equitum to the dictator Gaius Poetelius Libo in 313. Despite his victories over the Samnites, he was denied the honour of a triumph.
- Publius Poetelius, one of three ambassadors sent to Syphax, the king of Numidia, in 210 BC.
- Gaius Poetilius C. f. Paullus, a soldier in the praetorian guard, buried at Rome, aged twenty-seven, having served for eight years.
- Publius Poetellius P. l. Syrys, a freedman who worked as a lanista, or gladiator trainer, buried at Rome, aged forty-eight.

== See also ==
- List of Roman gentes

== Bibliography ==
- Diodorus Siculus, Bibliotheca Historica (Library of History).
- Titus Livius (Livy), History of Rome.
- Dionysius of Halicarnassus, Romaike Archaiologia.
- Censorinus, De Die Natali.
- Barthold Georg Niebuhr, The History of Rome, Julius Charles Hare and Connop Thirlwall, trans., John Smith, Cambridge (1828).
- Dictionary of Greek and Roman Biography and Mythology, William Smith, ed., Little, Brown and Company, Boston (1849).
- Theodor Mommsen et alii, Corpus Inscriptionum Latinarum (The Body of Latin Inscriptions, abbreviated CIL), Berlin-Brandenburgische Akademie der Wissenschaften (1853–present).
- George Davis Chase, "The Origin of Roman Praenomina", in Harvard Studies in Classical Philology, vol. VIII (1897).
- T. Robert S. Broughton, The Magistrates of the Roman Republic, American Philological Association (1952).
