= Granius Flaccus =

Granius Flaccus (fl. 1st century BC) was an antiquarian and scholar of Roman law and religion, probably in the time of Julius Caesar and Augustus.

== Religious scholar ==
Granius wrote a book De indigitamentis ("On Forms of Address"), on the indigitamenta, that is, those pontifical books that contained prayer formularies or lists of deity names as a reference for accurate invocations. Granius dedicated this work to Caesar, as his contemporary Varro did his Antiquitates Divinae. The title of the book is taken from a citation in the 3rd-century grammarian Censorinus. Macrobius cites him jointly with Varro as an authority on a religious point.

Granius was used as a source on ancient Roman religion by the Church Fathers; Arnobius, for instance, refers to him as many as five times in his books Contra Paganos, second in number only to Varro, equal to the famed Pythagorean scholar Nigidius Figulus, and more often than Cicero. Arnobius implies that he knows the works of Aristotle only indirectly, and cites Granius as his intermediary source at least once. This was but amended by Nino Marinone in “Aristocles”, author of the second century B.C., who is known to have written about theological issues. Vid. De Paolis 1986: in Macrob.Sat.I.18.1, [“Macrobio 1934- 1984”, Lustrum 28-29]. Granius, he says, demonstrates that Minerva is Luna, and also identified the Novensiles with the Muses.

Granius maintained that the Genius and the Lar were one and the same. He shared the view of Varro that the res divinae for both Apollo and Father Liber were celebrated on Mount Parnassus. It is sometimes unclear whether references to "Flaccus" refer to him or to Verrius Flaccus.

== Jurist ==
Granius is cited as an authority in the Digest of Justinian, where he is said to have written a book on Papirian law (Ius Papirianum) as ascribed to the 6th-century BC pontifex Papirius. A reference in Cicero to the Papirii dates the book to sometime after October 46 BC. The ius Papirianum dealt with the laws of the kings (leges regiae), which were sacred laws and required knowledge of pontifical records; therefore, the interests of Granius in legal and religious formulas should be seen as compatible. Granius recorded, for instance, that Numa Pompilius, in founding religious rites for the Romans, struck a deal with the gods to punish those who committed perjury. It may be that no collection of leges regiae existed earlier, and the idea that there was a ius Papirianum originated with the work of Granius at the beginning of Augustus' reign. He may thus be a more significant jurist than the extremely scant remains of his work would indicate.

The point of law cited in the Digest involves distinguishing a girlfriend (amica) from a concubina as defined by law. Granius explained that pellex (found elsewhere as paelex), Greek pallakis, had become the usual term for a woman sleeping regularly with a man who has a legal wife (uxor), but that formerly it referred to a live-in partner in lieu of a wife.

This Granius is sometimes identified with Granius Licinianus; the latter, however, is almost always dated to the time of Hadrian.
