= Uncial 068 =

- New Testament manuscript
- Text: John 13:16-27; 16:7-19
- Date: 5th century
- Script: Greek
- Found: 1847, Nitrian desert
- Now at: British Library
- Size: 26 x 24 cm
- Type: Alexandrian text-type
- Category: III
- Note: marginalia

Uncial 068 (in the Gregory-Aland numbering), ε 3 (Soden), is a Greek uncial manuscript of the New Testament, dated paleographically to the 5th century. Tischendorf designated it by I^{b}, Scrivener by N^{b}. It has some marginalia.

== Description ==
The codex contains a fragments of the John 13:16-27; 16:7-19 (with lacunae), on 2 parchment leaves (26 cm by 24 cm). The text is written in two columns per page, 18 lines per page in large uncial letters. It has no capital letters.

It is a double palimpsest, the Greek biblical text was overwritten twice in Syriac language, in the 9th century, and in the 10th or 11th century. It contains hymns of Severus in Syriac. The Ammonian Sections are present, but the Eusebian Canons absent. It contains breathing and accents. It has itacistic errors (e.g. κρεισεως in John 16:8).

Contents

John 13:16-17.19-20.23-24.26-27; 16:7-9.12-13.15-16.18-19

== Text ==
The Greek text of this codex is a representative of the Alexandrian text-type, with some non-Alexandrian readings (e.g. J 16:12). Aland placed in Category III.

John 16:7-8,12-15

| [πεμ]ψω αυτον [προ]ς υμας [και ελθ]ων εκει [νος] ελεγξει τον [κοσ]μον περι [αμαρ]τιας και [περ]ι δικαιοσυ νης και περι κρεισεως | ετι πολλα εχω λε γειν υμιν αλλ ου δυνασθαι βαστα ζειν αρτι οταν δε ελθη εκεινος το π̅ν̅α̅ της αλη θειας οδηγησει υμας εις πασαν την αληθειαν |

John 16:15-16.18-19

| Δια τουτο ειπον οτι εκ του εμου λαμβανει και α ναγγελει υμιν μεικρον και ουκ ετι θεωρειτε με και παλιν μεικρο̅ και οψεσθαι με οτι υπαγω προς | τουτο [τι εστι̅] ο λεγει [το μικρο̅] ουκ οιδα[μεν τι] λαλει Εγνω [ο ι̅ς̅ οτι η] θελον [αυτον ε] ρωταν και [ειπεν] αυτοις περι [του] του ζητειτε |

== History ==
Currently the manuscript is dated by the INTF to the 5th century.

The manuscript was found in 1847 in the monastery at Nitrian Desert and brought to London. It was examined and deciphered by Tregelles and Tischendorf (about the same time).

Location

The codex is now located at the British Library (Add MS 17136) in London.

== See also ==
- List of New Testament uncials
- Textual criticism

Double palimpsests

- British Library, Add. 17212
- Codex Vaticanus 2061
