= Papiria =

Papiria may refer to:

- Papiria gens, family at ancient Rome
- Gethyllis, genus of bulbous plant
