= Petillia gens =

Ancient Roman family

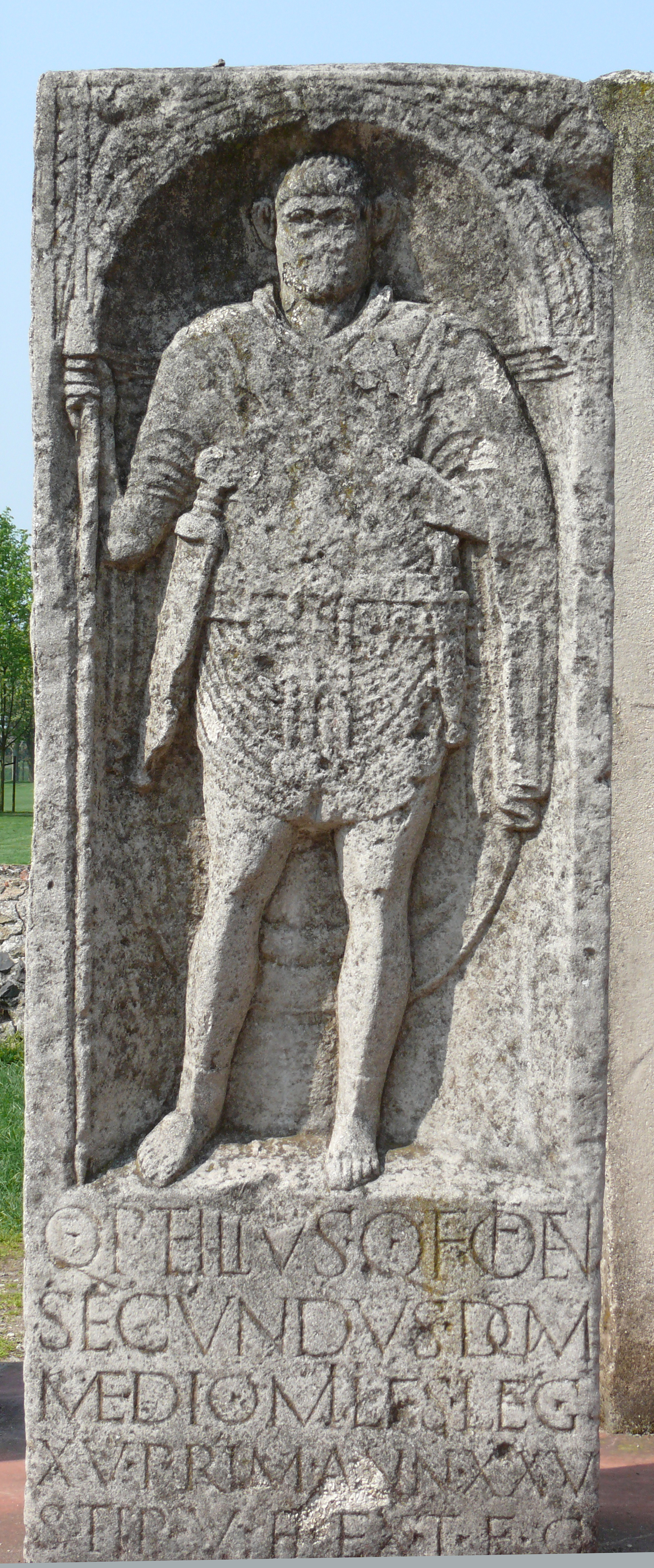
Monument of Quintus Petilius Secundus, a soldier stationed in Germania Inferior during the first century.

The gens Petillia or Petilia was a plebeian family at ancient Rome. Members of this gens first appear in history at the beginning of the second century BC, and the first to obtain the consulship was Quintus Petillius Spurinus in 176 BC.

== Origin ==
The nomen Petillius, also spelled Petilius, Petelius, and Petellius, is almost certainly derived from the cognomen Petilus, meaning "slender", and belongs to a class of gentilicia formed using the typically diminutive suffixes -illius and -ellius. The name is regularly confused with that of the Poetelii, an older plebeian family that occurs from the time of the Decemvirs down to the period of the Samnite Wars, but they do not appear to have been the same.

== Branches and cognomina ==
The only surnames of the Petillii in the time of the Republic were Capitolinus and Spurinus, of which only the former occurs on coins. A number of Petillii are found without cognomina.

Spurinus, belonging to one of the earliest Petillii appearing in history, appears to be connected with the Etruscan gentile Spurina, hinting at an Etruscan origin of the gens, or perhaps a maternal ancestor of the Petillii. An alternative explanation might be as a diminutive of the praenomen Spurius, which the Etruscan scholar Wilhelm Deecke discussed in connection with similar Etruscan names. Although Deecke noted the use of the praenomen Spurie by the Etruscans, the orthography used in Greek transliterations argued in favour of a Latin origin.

The cognomen Capitolinus is said to have been bestowed upon one of the Petillii who was caretaker of the Temple of Jupiter on the Capitoline Hill in the time of Augustus. However, Capitolinus was a relatively common surname, typically signifying someone who lived on the Capitol. Coins this family depicts the Temple of Jupiter on the reverse, while the obverses depict either a head of Jupiter, or an eagle, as a symbol of Jupiter.

== Members ==
This list includes abbreviated praenomina. For an explanation of this practice, see filiation.

- Quintus Petillius C. f. Q. n. Spurinus, as tribune of the plebs in 187 BC, (Note: There were two men named Quintus Petillius among the tribunes of 187, and Valerius Antias reports that they acted in concert in accusing Scipio, having been induced to do so by Cato the Censor. According to other sources, the accusation was brought by Gaius Minucius Augurinus, or by Marcus Naevius, one of the tribunes of 184.) accused Scipio Africanus of having accepted a bribe to deal leniently with Antiochus, and called for an investigation of others suspected of having been bribed by Antiochus. He was praetor urbanus in 181, when he ordered the destruction of some books that were claimed to have belonged to Numa Pompilius. (Note: Livy reports that two stone chests bearing the name of Numa Pompilius were discovered by workmen on the land of Lucius Petillius, a scribe and a friend of the praetor. One was said to contain the king's body, but was completely empty. The other contained a number of books on philosophy and religious rites. The praetor examined the books, and concluded that they would damage public confidence in the state religion, so he ordered them burnt, and Lucius compensated for the confiscation of his property.) Consul in 176, he was slain in battle against the Ligures.
- Quintus Petillius, tribune of the plebs in 187 BC, together with Quintus Petillius Spurinus, with whom he is said by some authorities to have acted in concert respecting the accusation against Scipio Africanus and the call to investigate those who had received money from Antiochus. How the two Petillii were related is unknown.
- Lucius Petillius, a scribe who lived at the foot of the Janiculum. In 181 BC, workmen on his land discovered two stone chests, one of which claimed to be the sarcophagus of Numa Pompilius, while the other was supposed to contain his books. No trace of a body was found, but the books were examined and then ordered destroyed by Quintus Petillius Spurinus, the praetor urbanus.
- Lucius Petillius, one of the ambassadors imprisoned by Gentius in 168 BC, and freed following that king's defeat by the praetor Lucius Anicius Gallus.
- Publius Petellius Q. f., an eques named in an inscription from Samothrace, dating to 100 BC.
- Quintus Petillius L. f., an eques who served under Pompeius Strabo in 88 BC.
- Marcus Petilius, mentioned by Cicero as an eques who had business at Syracuse during the administration of Verres in Sicily.
- Quintus Petilius, one of the judges at the trial of Titus Annius Milo.
- Petillius Capitolinus, custodian of the Temple of Jupiter on the Capitoline Hill during the time of Augustus. He was accused of stealing the crown from the statue of Jupiter, but was acquitted, supposedly due to his friendship with the emperor.
- Titus Petillius P. f., one of the duumvirs at Forum Clodii in AD 18.
- Petilius Rufus, (Note: Petitius in some editions of Tacitus.) one of several men of praetorian rank, who in AD 28 accused the eques Titius Sabinus of disloyalty to the emperor, in the hopes of gaining the consulate through the favour of Sejanus. Sabinus was put to death through their machinations.
- Lucius Petillius L. f. Saturninus, named in a first-century inscription from Clusium in Etruria.
- Petillia Q. l. Irena, a freedwoman named in a first-century inscription from Rome.
- Lucius Petillius L. l. Panemus, a freedman named in a first-century inscription from Rome.
- Petillia Rustica, named in an inscription from Rome, dating from the middle to the late first century.
- Quintus Petillius, named in a list of gladiators from Pompeii. The inscription mentions the number of battles each had fought, but Petillius' record is missing.
- Gaius Petillius Q. f. Firmus, a military tribune in the fourth legion, during the reign of Vespasian. He later served as a judicial magistrate at Arretium in Etruria.
- Quintus Petillius Cerealis Caesius Rufus, a general in the time of his kinsman, the emperor Vespasian. He served in Britain during Boadicea's revolt in AD 61, then supported Vespasian's elevation to the empire. In 70, he succeeded in quelling the revolt of Civilis, and was appointed consul suffectus ex Kal. Jul. He was governor of Britain during the campaigns of Agricola. He was consul suffectus ex Id. Mai. in 74, and consul ordinarius with the emperor Domitian in 83.
- Quintus Petillius T. f., named in an inscription from Rome, dating to AD 78.
- Marcus Petilius Athenaidi l. Successus, a freedman who dedicated a monument at Rome to Claudia Storge, dating to the later first or second century.
- Gaius Petillius C. f. Vindex Batavus, named in an inscription from Brigetio in Pannonia Superior, dating from AD 110.
- Quintus Petilius Q. l. Felix, a freedman named in an inscription from Rome, dating to AD 119, together with a number of other freedmen.
- Petilia Euphrosyne, the wife of Gaius Lucretius Euhodius, and mother of Gaius Lucretius Priscus and Gaius Lucretius Euhodianus, buried in a second century sepulchre at Rome, aged twenty-two.
- Petellius Faustus, one of the centurions of the sixth cohort in the third legion at Lambaesis in Numidia, according to an inscription dating to AD 161.
- Petilius Paulus, a soldier in the third legion at Lambaesis, according to an inscription dating to AD 161.
- Lucius Petilius Nepos, one of the duumviri at Perusia in AD 166.
- Quintus Petilius Severianus, named in an inscription from Rome, dating to AD 186.
- Petilia C. f. Irena, buried in rural Samnium with a monument from her mother, Gavia Auxime, dating to AD 198.
- Marcus Petellius Felix, one of the vigiles at Rome, listed in an inscription dating to AD 208.

=== Undated Petillii ===
- Petilia, one of the heirs of a soldier buried at Timacum Minus in Moesia Superior.
- Petellia, named in an inscription from Pagus Vetanus in Campania.
- Petillia Ↄ. l., a freedwoman buried at Rome.
- Petillia Ↄ. l., a freedwoman buried at the present site of Mompeo in Latium.
- Petilia C. l., a freedwoman buried at Patavium in Venetia and Histria.
- Petilia L. f., buried at Tarquinii, aged fifty-eight.
- Petilia L. f., named in an inscription from Ucubi in Hispania Baetica.
- Petilia L. l., a freedwoman named in an inscription from Praeneste in Latium.
- Petillia L. l., a freedwoman buried at Rome, with a monument from Critonia Nike.
- Petilia, daughter of Hilaritatus, buried at Formiae in Latium, aged seventeen, with a monument from her parents.
- Gaius Petelius, dedicated a monument at the present site of Lara de los Infantes, formerly in Hispania Citerior to his wife, Arcea Elianoca, the daughter of Paternus, who died aged thirty. Probably the father of Gaius Petelius Paternus, buried nearby.
- Gaius Petilius S. f. Adeptus, buried at Rome, aged four years, four months, and twenty-one days.
- Lucius Petilius, dedicated a monument at Salona in Dalmatia to his sister, Apuleia Jucunda.
- Lucius Petillius, a soldier named in an inscription from Clusium.
- Lucius Petilius, named in an inscription from Rome.
- Lucius Petilius Ↄ. l., a freedman buried at Rome.
- Lucius Petillius C. f., named in an inscription from Lussonium in Pannonia Inferior.
- Quintus Petilius, named in an inscription found at the present site of Acquapendente, in Etruria.
- Quintus Petillius, named in an inscription from Narbo in Gallia Narbonensis.
- Quintus Petillius Q. f., named in an inscription from Pisae in Etruria.
- Titus Petilius, named in an inscription from Camerinum in Umbria.
- Titus Petelius P. f., buried at Altinum in Venetia and Histria.
- Marcus Petilius Adlectus, husband of Scribonia Venusta, was buried at Rome, aged forty, having served as one of the emperor's attendants for twenty-one years.
- Quintus Petilius Agricola, buried at Reate in Latium, with a monument from his slave, Geminus.
- Quintus Petilius Q. f. Alexander, son of Quintus Petilius Faustus and Ulpia Alexandria, buried at Rome, aged nine years, four months, and seventeen days.
- Quintus Petillius Q. l. Alexander, a freedman, and the husband of Petillia Zaelis, named in an inscription from the present site of Stroncone, formerly part of Samnium.
- Lucius Petilius Alianus, named in an inscription from the present site of Bischofshofen, formerly part of Noricum.
- Gaius Petilius Amandus, a veteran of the fourteenth legion, and decurion at Salona, where he was buried with a monument from his wife, Petilia Secundina.
- Quintus Petillius Amphio, named in a dedicatory inscription from Rome.
- Petilia Ampliata, the wife of Gaius Julius Martialis, and mother of Viricia Euhodia, a young woman buried at Rome, aged nineteen.
- Gaius Petilius C. l. Anteros, a freedman buried at Patavium.
- Petilius Apollonius, named in a libationary inscription from the present site of Baldushk, formerly in Macedonia.
- Petilius Asianus, father of Tintirius Asianus, who built a monument to his father at Ligures Baebiani in Samnium.
- Quintus Petillius Attalus, named in an inscription from Rome.
- Quintus Petillius Q. l. Attalus, a freedman named in an inscription from Septempeda in Picenum.
- Petillia Attica, named in an inscription from Clusium.
- Petilius Augurinus, brother of Petilius Sabinus and Petilius Candidus, with whom he dedicated a monument at Ariminum in Cisalpine Gaul to their parents, Petilius Sabinus and Secunda.
- Lucius Petilius Aurelianus, a soldier in the seventh legion, named in a libationary inscription from the present site of Buljesovce, formerly in Moesia Superior.
- Petilius Barbarus, buried at Sigus in Numidia, aged thirty-five.
- Gaius Petilius Bassus, buried at Rome, aged thirty-five.
- Petilia Q. f. Calliope, infant daughter of Quintus Petilius Pergamus and Petilia Nike, buried at Rome, aged five months.
- Petilius Callistus, named in an inscription from Nomentum in Latium.
- Gaius Petilius Calno, buried at Tuscana in Etruria, aged fifty-three.
- Petilius Candidus, brother of Petilius Augurinus and Petilius Sabinus, with whom he dedicated a monument at Ariminum to their parents, Petilius Sabinus and Secunda.
- Lucius Petilius Celer, buried at Asseria in Dalmatia, with a monument from his sister.
- Petilius Tironis l. Cerealis, (Note: Here the filiation refers to his master's cognomen, Tiro.) a freedman, and the husband of Petilia Cybele, named in an inscription from Aquileia in Venetia and Histria.
- Petilia Chrestene, the wife of Q. Arrenius Primitius, buried at Rome, aged twenty-eight.
- Gaius Petillius Chryseros, named in a funerary inscription from Beneventum.
- Petillia Clara, buried at Scupi in Moesia Superior, aged four.
- Quintus Petillius Q. f. Clemens, the son of Quintus Petillius Eros and Petillia Fausta, husband of Firmia Tertulla, and father of Lucius Petillius Martialis and Quintus Petillius Saturninus, buried at the present site of Châtel-Argent, formerly in the province of Alpes Graiae.
- Marcus Petilius Clementius, dedicated a monument at Aquincum in Pannonia Inferior to his wife, Floria Matrona, aged forty years and five days.
- Quintus Petillius Q. f. Colonus, from Hispania Baetica, was a scribe employed by the curule aediles.
- Publius Petilius Clemens, named in an inscription from Casilinum in Campania.
- Petillia Clymene, dedicated a monument at Rome to Quintus Pomponius Cladus.
- Petilia Ↄ. l. Communis, a freedwoman buried at Corduba in Hispania Baetica, aged thirty-six.
- Titus Petilius T. f. Crescens, buried at Tuder in Umbria, with a monument from his freedman, Titus Petilius Primio.
- Quintus Petillius C. f. Crispus, brother of Gaius Plaestinus Petillianus, buried at Pola in Venetia and Histria.
- Petilia Cybele, a freedwoman, and the wife of Petilius Cerealis, named in an inscription from Aquileia.
- Gaius Petillius C. f. Dexter, buried at Venafrum in Latium.
- Petilius Docimus, son of Docimus and Januaria, buried at Rome, aged four years, four months, and fifteen days.
- Petilia Egloge, named in an inscription from Rome.
- Quintus Petillius Eros, probably a freedman, was the husband of Petillia Fausta, and father of Quintus Petillius Clemens, buried at Châtel-Argent.
- Petilia Eutychia, mother of Quintus Petilius Quinquatralus, to whom she set a monument at Rome.
- Publius Petilius Exoratus, was the heir of Titus Clodius Naso, a soldier in the praetorian guard at Ravenna, to whom he dedicated a monument.
- Titus Petilius Expectatus, buried at Firmum in Picenum.
- Petillia Q. l. Fausta, a freedwoman, and the wife of Quintus Petillius Eros, was the mother of Quintus Petillius Clemens. She is buried at Châtel-Argent.
- Quintus Petilius Faustus, the husband of Ulpia Alexandria, and father of Quintus Petilius Alexander, for whom he built a monument at Rome.
- Petilius Felix, built a monument to his father at Auzia in Mauretania Caesariensis.
- Quintus Petilius Felix, praetor and one of the quinquennial magistrates at Laurentum and Lavinium, was the master of Pergamus and Nike, afterward Quintus Petilius Pergamus and Petilia Nike.
- Petilius Fructus, the husband of Ulpia Fronime, who built a sepulchre for her family at Ostia.
- Gaius Petilius Gaetulus, buried at Sigus, aged eighty-five.
- Titus Petellius Gemellus, buried at the present site of Bir Chegreff, formerly in Numidia, aged thirty.
- Gaius Petillius Hedystus, buried at Bononia in Cisalpine Gaul.
- Marcus Petillius M. l. Heraclida, a freedman named in a dedicatory inscription from Rome.
- Publius Petilius Homerus, dedicated a monument to his father at Spoletium.
- Petilia Hygia, the mother of Titus Petilius Titianus, to whom she dedicated a monument at Rome.
- Petilia Januaria, the mother of Quintus Calidius Urbanus, aged five years, six months, to whom she and her husband, Quintus Calidius, dedicated a monument at Rome.
- Petillia Q. l. Jucunda, a freedwoman named in a dedicatory inscription from Rome.
- Petilia Jucunda, buried at Interamna Nahars in Umbria.
- Petilia Justa, buried at Aquileia, aged nineteen years, three months, and ten days, with a monument dedicated by her mother, Lusidiena Pieris, and her brother, Titus Lusidienus Secundus.
- Petelia Justa, dedicated a monument at Misenum in Campania to her husband, Publius Sextilius Marcellus.
- Lucius Petillius Lollianus, named in an inscription from Ostia.
- Lucius Petilius Lupus, buried at Scupi, aged twenty-five, with a monument from his mother, Vesidia Ingenua.
- Petillia M. f. Maena, named in an inscription from Forum Novum in Cisalpine Gaul.
- Petilia T. l. Marta, a freedwoman buried at Corduba.
- Lucius Petillius Q. f. Q. n. Martialis, the son of Quintus Petillius Clemens and Firmia Tertulla, grandson of Quintus Petillius Eros and Petillia Fausta, and brother of Quintus Petillius Saturninus, buried at Châtel-Argent.
- Petillia Volsoni f. Maxima, (Note: The unusual filiation, Volsoni f. probably indicates that her father bore Vulso as a surname, rather than giving his praenomen. Vulso is best known as a cognomen of the ancient Manlia gens.) buried at Aenona in Dalmatia.
- Petellia Maximina, buried at Cirta in Numidia, aged forty.
- Publius Petilius Mercator, one of the municipal officials at Heraclea Lyncestis in Macedonia.
- Petillia Q. f. Modesta, buried at Aquileia, with a monument from her husband, Gaius Mutillius, a decurion at Aquileia.
- Petilia Moschis, dedicated a monument at Rome to her husband, Gaius Pomponius Servandus.
- Petilia Q. l. Nike, a freedwoman of Quintus Petilius Felix, wife of Quintus Petilius Pergamus, and mother of Petilia Calliope, an infant buried at Rome.
- Gaius Petelius Paternus, the son of Gaius Haerigius, and husband of Anna Maluga, was buried at Clunia in Hispania Citerior, aged fifty-six.
- Petilia Paulina, the mother of Petilius Paulinianus, dedicated a monument at Ariminum to her daughter-in-law, Sentia Justina, aged seventeen years, two months.
- Petilius Paulinianus, the son of Petilia Paulina, married Sentia Justina.
- Gaius Petillius Pavo, named in an inscriptions from Clusium.
- Quintus Petilius Q. l. Pergamus, a freedman of Quintus Petilius Felix, husband of Petilia Nike, and father of Petilia Calliope, an infant buried at Rome.
- Aulus Petilius Perseus, named in an inscription from Rome.
- Marcus Petilius M. f. Philero, a freedman buried at Interamna Nahars.
- Petillia L. l. Philumina, buried at Rome.
- Lucius Petilius L. l. Priamus, a freedman buried at Corduba.
- Publius Petillius Primigenius, the husband of Calpurnia Coene, and father of Petillia Sabina, buried at Hadria in Picenum.
- Sextus Petilius Primigenius, buried at Clusium, with a monument from his daughter, Justa.
- Titus Petilius T. l. Primio, freedman of Titus Petilius Crescens, to whom he dedicated a monument at Tuder.
- Petilius Primus, the husband of Seccia Silvia, and father of Petilia Valentina, a child buried at Clissa in Dalmatia.
- Petellia Prisca, buried in the family sepulchre built by her grandfather, Tiberius Claudius Pluto, at Ostia.
- Gaius Petilius Priscus, named in an inscription from Rome.
- Petilius Processius, a nobleman buried at Rome on May 25, in the consulship of Probus junior (possibly Anicius Probus Faustus, consul in AD 490).
- Petilia Proculina, dedicated a monument at Vicohabentia in Venetia and Histria to the memory of her grandson and namesake, Lucius Quadratianus Proculinus, a young man.
- Lucius Petilius Pudens, named in an inscription from Aquileia.
- Petelia Quieta, named in an inscription from Castellum Tidditanorum in Numidia.
- Quintus Petilius Quinquatralus, son of Petilia Eutychia, buried at Rome, aged six years, eight months, and twenty-six days.
- Petillia C. l. Quinta, a freedwoman buried at Venafrum.
- Gaius Petilius Restitutus, buried at Ammaedara in Africa Proconsularis, aged fifty.
- Quintus Petellius Rogatianus, named in an inscription from Castellum Tidditanorum.
- Petilia Romana, the wife of Allius Fortunatius, and mother of Petilius Rusticus, buried at Ammaedara, aged sixty-five.
- Gaius Petillius M. f. Rufus, a censor at Septempeda.
- Quintus Petillius M. f. Rufus, named in a funerary inscription from the island of Vele Srakane in the Adriatic.
- Petilius Rusticus, son of Allius Fortunatius and Petilia Romana, was a soldier, buried at Ammaedara, aged twenty-eight, with a monument from his father.
- Petillia P. f. Sabina, the daughter of Publius Petillius Primigenius and Calpurnia Coene, buried at Hadria.
- Petilia Q. f. Sabina, made a donation to the priests of Minerva at Ticinum in Cisalpine Gaul.
- Petilius Sabinus, the husband of Secunda, and father of Petilius Augurinus, Petilius Sabinus, and Petilius Candidus, who dedicated a monument to their parents at Ariminum.
- Petilius Sabinus, brother of Petilius Augurinus and Petilius Candidus, with whom he dedicated a monument at Ariminum to their parents, Petilius Sabinus and Secunda.
- Petellia Satura, dedicated a monument at Lambaesis to her husband, Quintus Laelius Saturus.
- Lucius Petilius L. f. Saturninus, named in an inscription from Clusium.
- Quintus Petillius Q. f. Q. n. Saturninus, the son of Quintus Petillius Clemens and Firmia Tertulla, grandson of Quintus Petillius Eros and Petillia Fausta, brother of Lucius Petillius Martialis, and husband of Salvia Lasciva, was a soldier in the twenty-second legion, and one of the Seviri Augustales.
- Petilia Secunda, dedicated a monument on the island of Brattia in the Adriatic to the memory of Aurelius Nigellio.
- Petilia Secundina, dedicated a monument at Salona to her husband, the decurion Gaius Petilius Amandus.
- Petilia Q. f. Secundina, daughter of Messia Dorcas, buried at Butuntum in Apulia, aged nine years, seven months, and eighteen days.
- Quintus Petillius Secundus, dedicated a monument at Rome to his mother, Cornelia Glyce, a freedwoman.
- Quintus Petilius Q. f. Secundus, a resident of Mediolanum, and a soldier in the fifteenth legion, buried at Bonna in Germania Inferior, aged twenty-five, having served five years.
- Gaius Petilius Sedatus, buried at Beneventum.
- Petilia Severa, buried at the present site of Châtillon, formerly part of Cisalpine Gaul, with a monument from her son, Valerius Vettianus.
- Petilia L. l. Sextula, named in a funerary inscription from Corduba.
- Quintus Petilius Ↄ. l. Sindenis, a freedman named in an inscription from Rome.
- Petilia Sintyche, dedicated a monument at Rome to Gaius Setonius, aged one year, seven days.
- Gaius Petillius C. l. Statius, a freedman buried at Venafrum.
- Quintus Petillius Stephanus, named in an inscription from Rome.
- Petilia Surilla, named in a funerary inscription from Timacum Minus.
- Quintus Petillius Q. l. Surus, a freedman, buried with the family of Quintus Petillius Saturninus.
- Lucius Petilius Syneros, buried at Rome.
- Lucius Petilius Telephus, named in an inscription from Ostia.
- Titus Petilius Titianus, son of Petilia Hygia, buried at Rome, aged twenty-two years, eight months, and twenty-five days.
- Sextus Petilius Titianus, buried at Brixia in Venetia and Histria.
- Petilia Titulla, buried at Milevum in Numidia, aged thirty-five.
- Petilia Valentina, daughter of Petilius Primus and Seccia Silvia, buried at Clissa in Dalmatia, aged six years, eight months, and eighteen days.
- Gaius Petilius Venustus, a tribune in the Praetorian Guard, named in a dedicatory inscription from Aquileia.
- Sextus Petilius Verus, named in an inscription from Aquileia.
- Lucius Petilius Victor, buried at Sitifis in Mauretania Caesariensis, aged forty.
- Petilia Victorina, dedicated a monument at Gaius Togernius Ingenuus, buried at Ulpia Traiana in Dacia, aged thirty.
- Publius Petilius P. f. Victorinus, a soldier buried at Ammaedara, aged thirty-three.
- Petillia Q. l. Zaelis, a freedwoman, and the wife of Quintus Petillius Alexander, named in an inscription from Stroncone.
- Gaius Plaestinus C. f. Petillianus, the brother of Quintus Petillius Crispus, was evidently adopted by a Plaestinus.

== See also ==
- List of Roman gentes
- Petilianus

== Bibliography ==
- Marcus Tullius Cicero, In Verrem, Pro Milone.
- Quintus Horatius Flaccus (Horace), Satirae (Satires).
- Titus Livius (Livy), History of Rome.
- Valerius Maximus, Factorum ac Dictorum Memorabilium (Memorable Facts and Sayings).
- Gaius Plinius Secundus (Pliny the Elder), Naturalis Historia (Natural History).
- Publius Cornelius Tacitus, Annales, Historiae, De Vita et Moribus Iulii Agricolae (On the Life and Mores of Julius Agricola).
- Plutarchus, Lives of the Noble Greeks and Romans.
- Appianus Alexandrinus (Appian), Macedonica (The Macedonian Wars).
- Lucius Cassius Dio Cocceianus (Cassius Dio), Roman History.
- Julius Obsequens, Liber de Prodigiis (The Book of Prodigies).
- Sextus Aurelius Victor, De Viris Illustribus (On Famous Men).
- Augustine of Hippo, De Civitate Dei (The City of God).
- Dictionary of Greek and Roman Biography and Mythology, William Smith, ed., Little, Brown and Company, Boston (1849).
- Theodor Mommsen et alii, Corpus Inscriptionum Latinarum (The Body of Latin Inscriptions, abbreviated CIL), Berlin-Brandenburgische Akademie der Wissenschaften (1853–present).
- Wilhelm Deecke, Etruskische Forschungen und Studien (Etruscan Research and Studies), Albert Heitz, Stuttgart (1881).
- Bulletin Archéologique du Comité des Travaux Historiques et Scientifiques (Archaeological Bulletin of the Committee on Historic and Scientific Works, abbreviated BCTH), Imprimerie Nationale, Paris (1885–1973).
- René Cagnat et alii, L'Année épigraphique (The Year in Epigraphy, abbreviated AE), Presses Universitaires de France (1888–present).
- George Davis Chase, "The Origin of Roman Praenomina", in Harvard Studies in Classical Philology, vol. VIII (1897).
- Stéphane Gsell, Inscriptions Latines de L'Algérie (Latin Inscriptions from Algeria, abbreviated ILAlg), Edouard Champion, Paris (1922–present).
- T. Robert S. Broughton, The Magistrates of the Roman Republic, American Philological Association (1952).
- Anna and Jaroslav Šašel, Inscriptiones Latinae quae in Iugoslavia inter annos MCMXL et MCMLX repertae et editae sunt (Inscriptions from Yugoslavia Found and Published between 1940 and 1960, abbreviated ILJug), Ljubljana (1963–1986).
- José A. Abásolo, Epigrafia Romana de la Region de Lara de los Infantes (Roman Inscriptions from the Area around Lara de los Infantes, abbreviated ERLara), Burgos (1974).
- Fanou Papazoglou, Inscriptions de la Mésie Supérieure (Inscriptions of Moesia Superior, abbreviated IMS), Belgrade (1976–present).
- Paul A. Gallivan, "The Fasti for A.D. 70–96", in Classical Quarterly, vol. 31, pp. 186–220 (1981).
- Giovanni Battista Brusin, Inscriptiones Aquileiae (Inscriptions of Aquileia, abbreviated InscrAqu), Udine (1991–1993).
- Carte Archéologique de la Gaule (Archaeological Map of Gaul, abbreviated CAG), vol. 11–01, Narbonne et le Narbonnaise, Paris (2003).
- Anamarija Kurilić, "Recent Epigraphic Finds from the Roman Province of Dalmatia", in Dalmatia: Research in the Roman Province, 1970-2001, pp. 133–147, Oxford (2006).
- Skënder Anamali, Hasan Ceka, and Élizabeth Deniaux, Corpus des Inscriptions Latines d'Albanie (The Body of Latin Inscriptions from Albania, abbreviated CIA), École Française de Rome (2009).
- Marina Silvestrini, Le Tribù Romane (The Roman Tribes), Bari (2010).
