= Lectionary 98 =

Lectionary ℓ 98
- New Testament manuscript
- Text: Evangelistarion
- Date: 15th-century
- Script: Greek
- Now at: Bibliothèque nationale de France
- Size: 22.9 cm by 17.3 cm

Lectionary 98, designated by siglum ℓ 98 (in the Gregory-Aland numbering), is a Greek manuscript of the New Testament, on parchment leaves. Palaeographically it has been assigned to the 15th-century. In some parts it is a double palimpsest.

== Description ==
The codex is an Euchologium with lessons from the Gospels John, Matthew, and Luke lectionary (Evangelistarion) with some lacunae. It is written in Greek minuscule letters, on 196 parchment leaves (22.9 cm by 17.3 cm). The writings stands in one column per page, 21-22 lines per page. It contains part of the Pericope Adulterae (John 8:3-11).

It is a palimpsest. The lower text was written in Greek. It contains Menaion. Some portions were even twice overwritten (in Latin).

== History ==
The manuscript was written in the West. It once belonged to Cardinal Mazarin. It was added to the list of New Testament manuscripts by Scholz, who examined it partially. It was examined and described by Paulin Martin. C. R. Gregory saw it in 1885.

The manuscript is not cited in the critical editions of the Greek New Testament (UBS3).

Currently the codex is located in the Bibliothèque nationale de France (Gr. 377) in Paris.

== See also ==
- List of New Testament lectionaries
- Biblical manuscript
- Textual criticism
- British Library, Add. 17212 – double palimpsest
