= British Library, Add MS 17212 =

British Library, Add MS 17212 is a double palimpsest, with three successive writings: a Syriac translation of St. Chrysostom's Homilies of the 9th/10th century covers a Latin grammatical treatise from the 6th century, written in cursive, which in turn covers the Annales of Roman historian Granius Licinianus. It is a rare example of a double palimpsest. The manuscript has survived in incomplete condition.

== Description ==
The manuscript contains 13 leaves each measuring 9 1/4 in × 6 7/8 in (230 mm × 170 mm), most of which were torn along the outer edges. Each page of the manuscript is palimpsest, except folio 9.

The youngest text of the palimpsest contains the Homilies of John Chrysostom. The writing is in two columns per page, 25–29 lines per page, in a good and regular hand. It contains the following homilies: On the Prodigal Son, On Lent, On the Human Nature of our Lord, Three discourses on the Contest of our Lord with Satan. All these homilies follow one another in correct original order, without any lacunae.

The older text is of a Latin grammar treatise on folios 1-8, 10-13. It is written in minuscule letters. The writing is most legible on folios 2, 7, and 10. Probably it was written in North Italy. The text of the fragment was published by Elias Avery Lowe in Codices Latini antiquiores (1935).

The oldest text of the palimpsest, the Annales of Granius Licinianus, is written in elegant, small-sized uncial letters. The most visible text survives on pages 1 verso and 5 recto. These fragments were edited by Karl Pertz in 1857.

== History ==
The manuscript was discovered in 1842 in the monastery of St. Mary Deipara in the Wadi El Natrun of Egypt and brought to London along with the other 550 manuscripts. The manuscript was described by William Aldis Wright.

Currently it is housed at the British Library (Additional Manuscripts 17212) in London. Access to the manuscript requires an appropriate letter of scholarly introduction.

== See also ==
Double palimpsests

- Codex Vaticanus 2061
- Uncial 068
- Lectionary 98
