= Uncial 053 =

- New Testament manuscript
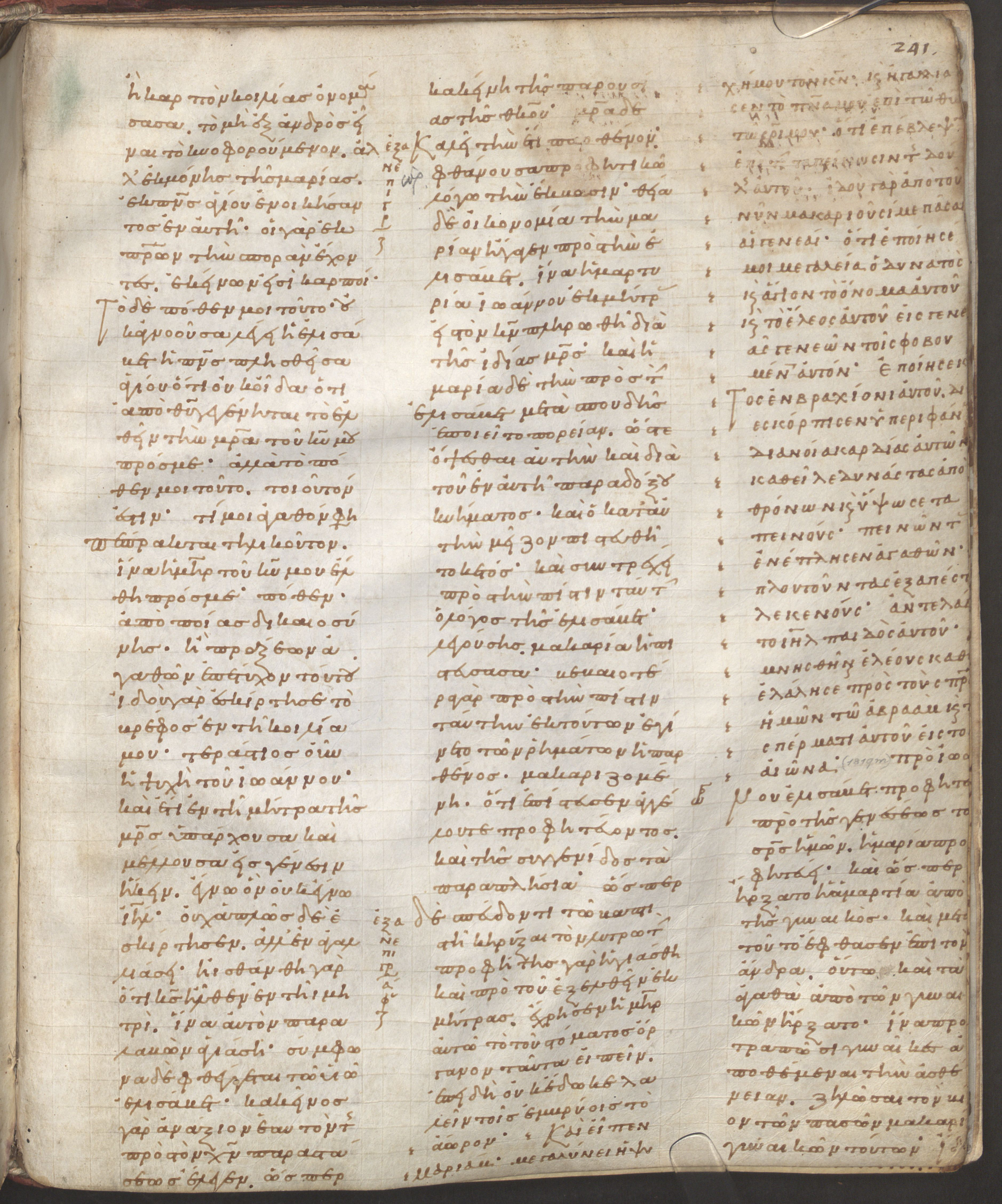
- Text: Gospel of Luke
- Date: 9th century
- Script: Greek
- Now at: Bavarian State Library
- Size: 27.5 x 23 cm
- Type: Byzantine text-type
- Category: V

Uncial 053 (in the Gregory-Aland numbering), A^{4} (Soden), is a Greek uncial manuscript of the New Testament, dated paleographically to the 9th century.

== Description ==
The codex contains a part of the Gospel of Luke (1:1-2:40), with a commentary on 14 parchment leaves (27.5 cm by 23 cm). It is written in three columns per page, 42 lines per page. The parchment is thick and the ink is brown. The text has breathings and accents.

The text of the commentary is written in minuscule hand.

It is one of the very few codices written in three columns per page. Other codices with three columns include Codex Vaticanus, Codex Vaticanus 2061 and 460.

The Greek text of this codex is a representative of the Byzantine text-type. Aland placed it with some hesitation in Category V. According to the Claremont Profile Method it represents textual family K^{x} in Luke 1.

Currently it is dated by the INTF to the 9th century.

The codex now is located in Munich in the Bavarian State Library (Gr. 208, fol. 235-248).

== See also ==
- List of New Testament uncials
- Textual criticism
