= Gaius Papirius (pontifex maximus) =

Roman Pontifex Maximus in 509 BC

Gaius Papirius was pontifex maximus in 509 BC, the first year of the Roman Republic. He copied the religious ordinances established by Numa Pompilius, the second King of Rome, which his grandson, Ancus Marcius, had carved on oaken tablets, and placed in the Forum.

According to Pomponius, a Sextus or Publius Papirius had collected all of the leges regiae, the laws established by the kings, in the time of the Tarquins. (Note: The timing is unclear, because Pomponius refers to this occurring in the time of Tarquinius Superbus, the son of Demaratus. But it was Lucius Tarquinius Priscus who was the son of Demaratus, succeeding to the throne after the death of Ancus Marcius; Tarquinius Priscus was probably his grandson.) This collection came to be known as the Ius Papirianum or Ius Civile Papirianum. (Note: Or Jus (Civile) Papirianum.) Münzer postulated that this collection was the same as that recorded by Gaius Papirius, the Pontifex Maximus, who would then be identified with the Sextus or Publius Papirius referred to by Pomponius.

== See also ==
- Papiria (gens)

== Bibliography ==
- Dionysius of Halicarnassus, Romaike Archaiologia (Roman Antiquities).
- Titus Livius (Livy), History of Rome.
- Digesta seu Pandectae (The Digest).
- Dictionary of Greek and Roman Biography and Mythology, William Smith, ed., Little, Brown and Company, Boston (1849).
- August Pauly, Georg Wissowa, et alii, Realencyclopädie der Classischen Altertumswissenschaft (Scientific Encyclopedia of the Knowledge of Classical Antiquities, abbreviated RE or PW), J. B. Metzler, Stuttgart (1894–1980).
- T. Robert S. Broughton, The Magistrates of the Roman Republic, American Philological Association (1952).
- Arnaldo Momigliano, "The Origins of Rome," in Cambridge Ancient History: The Rise of Rome to 220 B.C., vol. 7, part 2, Cambridge University Press (1989, 2002).
