= Nexum =

Debt bondage contract in early Roman Republic

Nexum was a debt bondage contract in the early Roman Republic. A debtor pledged his person as collateral if he defaulted on his loan. Details as to the contract are obscure and some modern scholars dispute its existence. It was allegedly abolished either in 326 or 313 BC.

== Contract ==
Nexum was a form of mancipatio, a symbolic transfer of rights that involved a set of scales, copper weights and a formulaic oath. It remains unclear whether debtors entered into a nexum contract initially with their loan or if they voluntarily did so after they could not pay off an existing debt. Nor is it clear how nexum absolved a debt: a nexus may have been required to labour until repayment of debt, labour in lieu of interest on debt, or labour in lieu of payment itself. In the last case, the debt would have been "worked off". It is also possible that a debtor may have had their debts repaid by a third party in exchange for becoming a bondsman of that third party.

In any case, such contracts were voluntary – in contrast to standard debt bondage in which a person was enslaved for failure to pay debts – and it is likely that a person reduced to bondage probably remained there permanently. Additionally, it is possible that there were many variations of the nexum contract, and that the details of nexum contracts were worked out on a case-by-case basis.

The purpose of the contract is also unclear. If it was not a means to repay debt through labour in lieu of payment, it may have been a signal to ensure prompt repayment in allowing a creditor to "proceed with personal execution on the debtor" if the borrower did not repay promptly. Some scholars doubt nexum's specific existence.

Despite constraining a free person's liberty (libertas), nexum was probably preferred to slavery or death for debtors: non-repayment of debts under the Twelve Tables resulted either in the total loss of citizenship rights through enslavement and sale across the Tiber or in the physical cutting up of the debtor's body. Though nexi were often beaten and abused by their creditors, they maintained (if sometimes only in theory) their Roman citizenship and rights. Creditors might profit more from a nexum contract, as they received a motivated contractual worker instead of a slave. An indebted paterfamilias, or legal head of the Roman household, might offer his son for nexum, instead of himself.

== History ==
Debt bondage was common both in Rome and other archaic societies as a consequence of poverty coupled with the limited and variable carrying capacity of the land. The traditional accounts of the early Republic, with their depiction of the patriciate's domination over Roman public land (Latin: ager publicus), imply that inequality in land ownership forced peasants into exploitative servitude to work land for the patriciate. Livy's narrative of the Gallic sack of Rome implies that many farmers became destitute due to disruption by the enemy army and, in the aftermath, he recounts agitation to free the plebs from bondage.

According to the Augustan-era historian Livy, nexum was abolished because of the excessive cruelty and lust of a single usurer, Lucius Papirius. He reports that in 326 BC, a young boy named Gaius Publilius was a guarantor to his father's debt, becoming the nexus of Papirius. In another version, Dionysius of Halicarnassus records that Publilius borrowed the money for his father's funeral. The boy was noted for his youth and beauty, and Papirius desired him sexually. He tried to seduce Publilius; when rejected, Papirius grew impatient and reminded the boy of his position as bondsman and had him stripped and lashed. The wounded boy ran into the street, and an outcry among the people led the consuls to pass the lex Poetelia Papiria, which forbade holding debtors in bondage for their debt, and required instead that the debtor's property be used as collateral. All people confined under the nexum contract were released, and nexum as a form of legal contract was forbidden thereafter.

Marcus Terentius Varro alternatively dates the abolishment of nexum to 313 BC, during the dictatorship of Gaius Poetelius Libo Visolus, who would have been the homonymous son of the Poetelius, who was consul in 326 BC.

Modern views of nexum's abolition also relate to the structural economic forces of Roman conquest: the success of Roman arms by the time of the Second Samnite war would have produced large amount of free land on which Roman colonists were settled with a corresponding influx of slaves to substitute for indigenous bond labour, making nexum "a relic of a bygone age".

Cicero considered the abolishment of the nexum primarily a political maneuver to temporarily appease the plebeian masses, who by Cicero's time (some three hundred years after any alleged lex Poetelia Papiria) were believed to have carried out three full-scale secessions:

When the plebeians have been so weakened by the expenditures brought on by a public calamity that they give way under their burden, some relief or remedy has been sought for the difficulties of this class, for the sake of the safety of the whole body of citizens.

Although the lex Poetelia ostensibly abolished imprisonment for debts, debt bondage continued in Rome for long after. Courts could still grant creditors the right to take insolvent debtors as bond slaves after a judgement so ordering.

== Etymology ==
Varro derives the word nexum from nec suum, "not one's own" and although that etymology is incorrect in light of modern scientific linguistics, it illuminates how the Roman understood the term.

Lewis and Short, an 1879 Latin dictionary, derives the word instead from the verb necto meaning "I bind".

== See also ==
- Twelve Tables
- Mithra-Varuna (Indo European)
