= Leges regiae =

Laws attributed to the ancient Roman kings

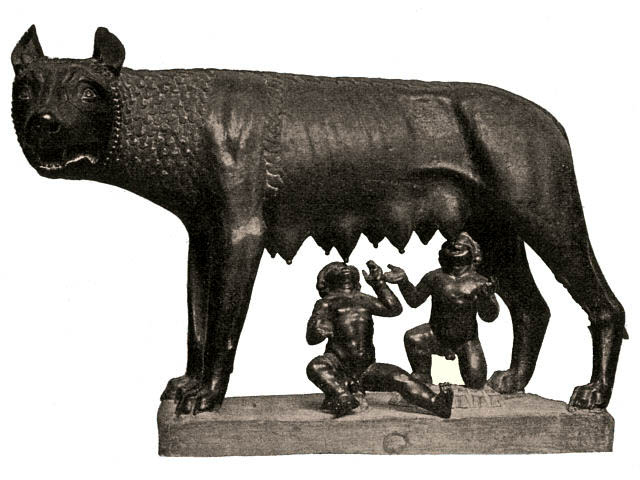
The Capitoline she-wolf with the boys Romulus and Remus. Museo Nuovo in the Palazzo dei Conservatori, Rome.

The leges regiae ('royal laws') were early Roman laws which classical historians such as Plutarch thought had been introduced by the semilegendary kings of Rome.

Though sometimes questioned, scholars of the modern era generally have accepted that the laws or the ultimate sources for them originated early in Roman history, even as early as the period of the Roman Kingdom (753–509 BC). In the 20th century, previously unrecognized fragments quoted by ancient writers were identified as leges regiae and attributed or reattributed to the various kings.

The king during Rome's Regal period was a political, military, religious, and judicial chief of the community, though his actual duties might be delegated and entrusted to his auxiliaries.

== Historical overview ==
According to Sextus Pomponius, Romulus organized the tribes of Rome into thirty units called "Curiae", and he then administered the affairs of the state on the basis of the opinion of the Curiate Assembly. This event is at the origin of lex regia.

Romulus is also credited with creating another institution involved in the emanation of leges regiae - the council of the elders or Senate of the Roman Kingdom.

After an interregnum Numa Pompilius succeeded to Romulus: as it will happen for each of his successors an interrex held the government til the election of the new king. Numa emanated a number of important leges regiae. To him was attributed the compilation of the book Commentari regi.

A great innovation of his concerned criminal law on voluntary and non voluntary crimes.

Some scholars argue on lexical grounds that in this period some leges regiae showed a Sabine influence.

Successor Tullus Hostilius is traditionally called the "warrior king". He celebrated the solemn sacrifices using the work by Numa Commentari Numae. He created the officials named Fetiales who were a sacerdotal collegium.

After him Ancus Marcius had sacral norms from Numa's work transcribed and made public. He established the jus fetiale and imprisonment.

The last three kings were Etruscans according to tradition. Their cultural heritage influenced the leges regiae of this period.

Tarquinius Priscus emanated multiple laws that covered different areas: he doubled the number of the senators and of the Vestals.

Servius Tullius then used Numa's work for the election of the consuls. Moreover, he established the census and the timocratic constitution that will be the basis for the future development of the republican institutions.

During the reign of Tarquinius Superbus there are to be mentioned repressive laws, international treaties and the adoption of the Libri Sibyllini.

The end of the kingdom is seen by some scholars as a slow, gradual process, while traditionally it was the abrupt expulsion of the king. This event brought about the abrogation of the leges regiae. However certainly not of all of them as e.g. the auspicium and Servius Tullius's reform of the eighteen equites survived.

With the advent of the Roman Republic the need was felt for an official figure who could perform the sacred rites or make decisions through auspicium, an institution governed by the lex regia. In short a figure who could take over the functions previously discharged by the rex.

Thus the office of rex sacrorum was created. It lasted until 390 AD when emperor Theodosius I abolished it. His power was strictly limited to the sphere of the sacrum. Scholars point out that when Pomponius in his Enchiridion states that the emanation of laws by the king took place on the deliberation of the curiae he refers to this period, i.e. a time when the power of the king was lessened.

The fire caused by the Gauls of king Brennus brought about the loss of the written records of leges regiae. The work of rewriting carried out by the sacerdotes was essential. Besides it is believed that Sextus Papirius's collection had survived, and was available for consultation at the times of Pomponius.

Pomponius maintains that all the leges regiae were abolished and they indeed disappeared in the following times.

Nonetheless scholars' research proves that some laws were still in use, e.g. Servius Tullius's norm of the eighteen equites. Livy himself writes that after the fire not only were the laws of the Twelve Tables collected by the sacerdotes and the senate but also laws of the kings, some of which were made public while some other were kept secret by the sacerdotes.

Finally Justinian's compilation mentions the leges regiae.

== Function of the lex regia in Roman society ==
Not only were the laws of the king an instrument of his power, they also answered the need of a society that was made up by different tribes to have certain law, a ius certum as is stated by Pomponius.

Moreover, at that time the king played the role of supreme judge and guarantor of the pax deorum, the peace between the community and the gods. This aim was to be achieved by the juridical instrument of the lex regia, the sacral role of the king being in fact that of a supreme judge.

The lex regia performed the function of composing controversies when the mores could not solve them. Moreover, it bestowed the king a way of solving religious and military issues, either directly or by means of some ausiliary as the magister populi of the Tarquinian times.

While on one hand the leges regiae created a new law different from the mores on the other hand they transformed some of them into laws.

It is believed that in the early times of the republic they were used as a mnemonic tool and a framework by the decemviri in the drafting of the Twelve Tables. Besides they acted as an intermediary stage between the mores and the Twelve Tables, answering the requirements of a society that was no longer satisfied with the revelations of the Pontifex Maximus.

== Influences present in the Lex Regia ==
Influences vary according to times and are mostly apparent in text edition. At the beginning a clear Greek influence is detectable. Tradition wants that Romulus studied at Gabii, moreover the Greek element in original Roman culture is certain. Trading and later political relationships are attested during the 8th century.

Another influence is the Sabine one that is reflected in the use of ox skin as a support for writing. Besides it is detectable in the character of the laws themselves as in the cases of the ones emanated by Servius Tullius, Numa Pompilius and even Romulus, as he reigned together with Titus Tatius.

Etruscan influences become apparent in the period of Etruscan kings and are of political, economic and juridical nature: an example is the attitude of the king towards the gentes, whose function was weakened by Etruscan kings.

== Legislative and executive aspects of the Lex Regia ==
Fragments found in Pomponius and in other authors on the subject show the lex regia was a deliberation of both the curiae and the senate which were approved by the rex with the support of the pontiff.

Many scholars though opine Pomponius refers to the republican period and the rex sacrorum as he had few sources for the archaic period. They do not trust the accuracy of these sources: for one thing they believe Pomponius's account was influenced by the model of voting method of the assemblies of the people of the republic (Comitia tributa, Comitia centuriata) in which the voting of the law proposed by a tribunus was voted by groupings named 'units'. Votes were not counted by head but by a majority within each single unit. The unit system had been established by king Servius Tullius: a unit could be made up by citizens who were not owners of any assets or the first class of cavalry.

Moreover, on the grounds of the powers the king held at the time of the regal period they think it was more probable that he decided without the veto of the curiae but only by the support of the collegium pontificum. and by deliberation of the senate. Some speculate that the curiae had only a function of public participation. The leges regiae were promulgated publicly at the presence of the curiae (comitia curiata).

Other sources state that on some days the king held a comitial assembly similar to those of the republican period. This is attested by the words "Quando Rex Comitiavit Fas (QCRF) present on the first Roman calendar.

On the above grounds scholars opine that the curiae had no voting right but only that of being present to the act of the promulgation as a witness and of showing their attitude on the matter by means of acclamation or of loud dissent.

On some occasions though the king allowed the intervention of the curiae on decisions in trials. Only one case is recorded, that of Publius Horatius. It was so until the repressive action in criminal matters became subject to the exclusive decision of the assembly of the people.

Some sources suggest that Servius Tullius set aside the curiae and had his decisions voted by militarily arranged centuriae. First he had the first class made up of eighty centuriae and the 18 of the equites vote. If they all agreed the law was passed, if they did not then the following five classes in order of decreasing census were in turn asked to vote, down to the lowest one, which was made up of citizens with no means and exempted from military service. This process ended when the number of ninety-seven centuriae in favour was reached.

Since the lex regia on one hand was meant to create a ius certum and on the other stemmed from the mores, the means to enforce it were in most instances sanctions of religious, sacral nature, (a piaculum or a sacrificium).

However these were not the only sanctions in use: other included the confiscation of property and capital punishment, that was not administered on any sacral principle but on that of the retribution of an offense with an equal punishment.

On the basis of the fragmentary condition of our information, it can be said that they concerned public, sacral, succession, procedural, agricultural, family, criminal matters as well as contract and obligations, although seldom they concerned the private sphere that was left mostly to the pater familias and the gens.

A partial detailed exposition follows here below.

== Romulus ==
Romulus's leges regiae were in part made in common with Titus Tatius.

Many concern public law. These include the union of the different tribes involved in the founding of Rome and the institution of the three legal tribes named after their three chiefs Romulus, Titus Tatius and Lucumo, the Ramnenses, Titienses and Luceres respectively. These were in turn divided into ten curiae each.

According to our sources they had the function of electing the magistrates, passing laws and examining questions concerning war if the rex so requested.

Another important act was the institution of the Roman Senate. It was formed by one hundred patricians. Romulus granted it the power of decision on the laws he proposed on a majority basis.

He statuted that Roman citizens should be warriors too, able to till the land and to wage war. He created the military unit known as legio and his personal guard named the celeres.

He reserved to himself decisions concerning sacred rites and sacrifices to gods, by the institution of sixty sacerdotes devoted to officiate them. In relation to this purpose he created the auspices and the augures. These people were taken from each curia. He created the Fratres Arvales, a sacred brotherhood devoted to agricultural rites of propitiation, the three flaminates i.e., the three flamines maiores, the flamen Dialis, the flamen Martialis and the flamen Quirinalis each devoted to the cult of a major deity.

He created the first Roman calendar year of 304 days divided into ten months: six of thirty days and four of thirty-one.

He established the ritual for the dedication of temples.

His provisions concerning private law were: succession of the wife in manus of the husband. If the husband dies first then the wife inherits his properties, in case there are children only by half.

He decided the jurisdiction of the rex as a guarantor of the lex regia. He also reserved to himself the right of judging most serious crimes while leaving other to the senate.

He decided to divide the land among the curiae, allotting it in part to agriculture and in part to the building temples or other sacred purposes.

He established that parents were obliged to nurture their children, at least the first (primogenitus) and were not allowed to kill them if they were under age three. An exception was the case that the child was a monstrum (seriously handicapped): in this case though the procedure required that the child were shown to five neighbours who testified its condition. If this procedure was not observed the punishment was the confiscation of half of the property or other sanctions.

He established the power of patrimoniality and authority of the pater familias, the patria potestas on illegal children (filius alieni iuris) that included the right to kill them.

In matrimonial law, he established the practice of manus marriage, in which the wife comes into the "hand" of the husband; that is, she is subject to his control as were his children. By this provision the wife was subject to her husband and was obliged to follow him and support him in every business including cults. (From the 2nd century BC, this was no longer the predominant form of marriage in Rome; the wife instead remained legally a part of her own family, and was never subject to her husband's control.) In the social field he is supposed to have created the system of patronage (patronus and cliens).

Crimes of women such as adultery and wine drinking had to be punished according to the law, but the decision was allocated to the family of the woman.

== Numa Pompilius ==
Numa was enthroned through the famous lex curiata de imperio. By this act he subordined his future power to the decision of the comitia curiata. This law would be used by every king until emperor Augustus and even later.

He abolished the celeres.

He divided Rome into pagi, each of them having their own magistrate and guard to police the territory.

He was the first to introduce the division of the people according to their profession thus creating corporations.

In the religious domain he instituted the menses (lunar months) and reformed the calendar by creating a twelve lunar month year plus an intercalary month (mercedonium), created various flaminates (including those other sources attribute to Romulus) and sacerdotia among which the Fetiales and the Salii, increased the number of the Vestales from four to six. He instituted the Pontifex maximus besides increasing the number of the sacerdotes and of the Collegium Pontificum and established various forms of dedication concerning various cults.

In private law he made provision concerning the paelex (concubine).

He made new redistributions of land, as the allotting to plebeians of demanial land.

In the field of criminal law his innovations were remarkable: he established the distinction between voluntary homicide (named paricida) and non voluntary. In cases of the first instance were nominated two quaestores paricidi to investigate the case and the accused was classified as paricida if he was convicted of killing with intention a free man, or even a parent or relative. In the first case paricida is connoted as homicida. The sanctioned parricidas punishment is unknown. In the second the parricidas punishment was the poena cullei. Its provisions consisted in closing the culprit murderer in a sack of ox skin and throwing him into the sea. Later it was changed to making the culprit exlege.

In case of non voluntary homicide it was only required the sacrifice of a goat to expiate the crime and purify the culprit.

Some sources attribute to Numa the creation of the Vestals. However, according to tradition they existed in Latin towns since before the foundation of Rome (Alba Longa had vestals, among them Romulus's mother Silvia) and it must be remembered that Titus Tatius had already dedicated the aedes Vestae. Theft of sacred objects or in sacred places was dealt with as paricidium, perjury was punished with death.

A father could legally sell his son unless he had already allowed him to get married. Wives were forbidden to drink wine as well as having relationships of any kind, unless the husband decided to present them to a childless man to father children. Afterwards he could decide to take her back.

Marriage was allowed even with girls under twelve. However women were permitted to make testament while their father was still living.

A lex regia traditionally ascribed to Numa is that concerning the spolia opima, or more precisely one of the two definitions of this institution: there is the occasion for them whenever a Roman defeats a dux hostium (chief of enemies) even if the victor is not necessarily the Roman dux. Three kinds of spoils are mentioned: the first consists of an offer of the arms of the defeated to Jupiter Feretrius and the sacrifice of an ox, the second of their offer to Mars and the sacrifice of solitaurilia (probably suovetaurilia) and the third their offer to Janui Quirino and the sacrifice of a lamb. They apply to the case that the Roman was the chief, an army officer or a common soldier respectively.

== Tullus Hostilius ==
According to the sources king Tullus established the office of the lictor, introduced the use of the painted toga named toga praetexta, created the office of the fetiales and their ritual function in the declaration of war. Only through this rite could a war be a just war (bellum iustum), i.e. a war in accord with the requirements of religion.

He also established the festivals Agonales and Saturnalia devoted to god Saturnus, as well as making the addition of another group (Collini) related to god Quirinus to the sacerdotium of the Salii.

He allowed some landless Romans to settle the Caelian Hill.

During his reign the case of Marcus Horatius is remarkable in the field of criminal law. When this Marcus Horatius was accused of perduellio, the duumviri perduellionis emitted a verdict of culpability on the question of the provocatio ad populum, a peculiarly devised procedural condition. Horatius's father though objected to the verdict. King Hostilius was unable to reach a decision, thus remitted the judgement to the people, i.e. the curiae. Marcus was acquitted.

King Hostilius also made laws that punished treason towards the king and desertion with death. To him is ascribed the creation of the penalty known as arbor infelix.

In the field of morals and the family he made a law that condemned incest: the culprit would become sacred to Diana in a public ceremony of derision and contempt. He also decided that the state would subsidise families who had a trigeminous delivery.

== Ancus Marcius ==
"Moreover having summoned the pontiffs and received from them the dispositions concerning the res sacrae that Pompilius had established, had them carved on small tables and exposed in the Forum for all those who would like to look at them" Dionysius of Halicarnassus Ant. Rom. 3, 36, 4

Marcius too emanated his own lex curiata de imperio.

In the field of public law established the foundations for the rerum repetitio, laws concerning sea trade and the taxation of the salt yielding ponds (salinae).

He decided to have king Numa's dispositions concerning the collegium pointificum carved on small tables.

He created the first prison as a measure intended for the suppression of crime.

After defeating the Latins he allowed them to settle down in Rome.

== Tarquinius Priscus ==
Tarquinius increased the number of senators from two to three hundred or according to other sources by the double. He divided them into gentes maiores and gentes minores.

He established the Roman games, doubled the number of the curiae and introduced differences of dressing for the different classes.

He added two Vestals to the original four and introduced the calendar of twelve months.

Some sources attribute to him the sanctions against the Vestals.

== Servius Tullius ==
Servius divided once again the territory of Rome into pagi: four of them were urban (regio Palatina, Suburana, Collina, and Esquilina) and twentysix suburban or rural.

He statuted that the inhabitants were obliged to live in their pagus and could not move to a different location. This provision was intended for fiscal purposes, as people had to pay taxes in the pagus they belonged to.

Servius first established the census. To take part in the census citizens were required to pay a fee. The census required citizens to provide an estimate of the value of their properties to enable the government to gather information by which impose taxes proportionally. Citizens were thus divided into five echelons or classes.

He created the markets, established the new festival of the Paganalia and dedicated temples such as those to goddess Fors Fortuna.

In the field of the judiciary he decided that he would only rule on public law cases and left to the pater familias and the gentes rulings on private law cases.

After conquering and annexing the territories of the collis Viminalis and Esquilinus he distributed them to landless Romans.

He ruled too that freed slaves could take part in public life and be censed as if they were ordinary free men. Those who were unwilling to go back to their home land should be registered in one of the four tribes he had created.

He had the curiae approve fifty dispositions concerning crimes and contracts. Finally it is ascribed to Servius the erection of the temple to Diana Nemorensis on the Aventine.

== Tarquinius Superbus ==
King Tarquinius Superbus abolished the taxation system based on the census and imposed an equal fiscal burden on every citizen.

He made various peace treaties.

In the religious field he adopted the Libri Sibyllini, books by which one could consult the will of gods and had their dispositions observed. He also dedicated new temples and established new cults.

In the field of criminal law he used the arbor infelix, a provision of Tullus Hostilius's. He resorted to paricidal punishments (i.e. the poena cullei) e.g. in the cases of Marcus Aquilius and Atilius.

He abolished all of Servius Tullius's laws on obligations and contracts.

== Leges regiae of uncertain attribution ==
Some fragments contain laws the attribution of which is uncertain.

One remarkable example is that of a lex regia that forbids the inhumation of a pregnant woman before delivery since it is believed that so doing would mean killing a life.

== Material used for writing the leges regiae ==
At the beginning (i.e. at the time of Romulus) the leges regiae were unwritten.

They were transmitted orally even if it is not certain that a writing system did not exist. However Romulus's laws were written down only at the time of Numa by Numa himself.

In Numa's times Romulus's laws and Numa's himself (the Commentarius Numae and all of the pontificial work of the time that was ascribed to Numa, i.e. the Libri pontificum), were written on the bark of lime tree used as paper, according to the testimony of our sources.

Subsequently, they were written on ox skin. This use is attested in the Tarquinian times.

According to another tradition they were written on a wooden table that had been spread upon with plaster (tabula dealbata). In this case the text would be painted instead of being carved.

Whatever the case it is sure they were written on perishable material. This might be the reason why we have been handed down little of this kind of legislative production.

It must be remembered that the fire caused by the Galli Senones in 390 or 387 BC was another reason of their disappearance.

To make amends for the loss it was necessary to resort to the memory of the sacerdotes who knew them by heart, or the work of historians and jurists. It is unlikely that such rielaborations were exact text quotations from the leges regiae as some sources maintain, simply they were reformulations containing some archaic expressions embedded.

== Known sources ==
There are different sources for the lex regia. One source is Sextus Pomponius's Enchiridion of Sextus Pomponius, even if it is just a fragment, preserved to us in Justinian's Digesta. This source is surely rich in interpolations, thus not fully reliable.

Another source is Papirius's Ius Papirianum.

Here below is the relevant quotation:

"Thus he (Romulus) proposed to the people some leges curiatae. Other were proposed by the following kings. All these laws are recorded together in Sextus Papirius's book, who lived at the time of Demaratus of Corinthus's proud son, among the most illustrious men. This book as we have said is called Ius Civile Papirianum".

(Sextus Pomponius Enchiridion par. 2, line 10)

This work should have contained lists of leges regiae but they have not been handed down to us. The nature and attribution of this work though is disputed. Some scholars think it might be a reworking of the lex Papiria and thus would have not contained the lists, or that the author was not Sextus Papirius but Gaius Papirius, the first pontifex maximus of the Roman Republic (there should be a lapse of 40–50 years between these two characters, both members of the same patrician gens), or it might be a reelaboration of the Commentarii Numae.

Livy makes a clear reference to the existence of the leges regiae relating the work of reconstruction of the laws done by magistrates and the senate at the turbulent times of Marcus Furius Camillus. He also states that some books were not available in public archives but were preserved secretly in those of the pontiffs or even of private people.

Berger's dictionary under the entry 'Papirius' (with no praenomen) states that "he was a pontifex maximus author of a collection called Ius Papirianum of rules of sacral law generally ascribed to the Leges Regiae. Existence of such a collection is based on the mention of a commentary thereon written by Granius Flaccus at the time of Caesar or Augustus, entitled De iure Papiriano".

Many other sources however contain relevant material.

There are few epigraphic sources contemporary to the kings of Rome.

== Bibliography ==
On history of Roman law and the historical context of the lex regia

- Mario Amelotti, Lineamenti di storia del diritto romano Giuffre', Milan, 1989.
- Amarelli Storia del diritto romano Aldo Schiavone ed., Giappichelli, Turin, 2001.
- Aldo Schiavone Linee di storia del pensiero giuridico romano Giappichelli, Turin, 1994.
- P. A. Brunt Classi e conflitti di classe nella Roma repubblicana Laterza, Bari, 1972.
- Salvatore Tondo Crisi della Repubblica in Roma: lezioni, II Giuffre', Milan, 1992.
- Federico D'Ippolito Giuristi e sapienti nella Roma arcaica Laterza, Bari 1986.
- M.I. Henderson "Potestas Regia" Journal of Roman Studies 47, 1957, pp. 83–87.
- C. W. Westrup Introduction to early Roman law 4, I (1950) 47.
- Pierangelo Catalano Linee del sistema sovrannazionale romano Giappichelli, Turin, 1965.
- Pierangelo Catalano Contributi allo studio del diritto augurale Giappichelli, Turin, 1960.
- Ugo Coli Regnum 1951.
- Piero de Franciscis Primordia Civitatis Rome, 1959.
- Santo Mazzarino Dalla monarchia allo stato repubblicano 1945.
- P. Fraccaro "The history of Rome in the regal period" Journal of Roman Studies 47, 1957, p. 64.
- Alfred Berger "Encyclopedic Dictionary of Roman Law" Transactions of the American Philosophical Society. New Series Vol.43, part 2, Philadelphia, 1953 s.v. "leges regiae", "lex regia".

General information on the lex regia

- Giovanni Pugliese Istituzioni di diritto romano Giappichelli, Turin.
- Giovanni Pugliese Istituzioni di diritto romano-Sintesi Giappichelli, Turin.

Specific works and sources concerning the lex regia

- Nicola Palazzolo Ab urbe condita. Fonti per la storia del diritto romano dall'eta' regia a Giustiniano.
- Patrizia Giunti Adulterio e leggi regie. Un reato fra storia e propaganda Giuffre', Milan, 1990.
- Sextus Pomponius Pomponii de origine juris fragmenta, recognovit et adnotatione critica instruxit F. Osannus 1848.
- Gennaro Franciosi, ed. Leges regiae Javini, Turin, 2003.
- Salvatore Tondo Leges regiae e paricidas Olschki, Florence, 1973.
- S. Riccobono Fontes iuris romani antejustiniani II, Florence, 1941.
- Giuseppe Valditara Studi sul magister populi: dagli ausiliari militari del rex ai primi magistrati repubblicani II, Giuffre', Milan, 1989.
- Riccardo Orestano I fatti di normazione nell'esperienza romana arcaica Turin, 1967.
- Leonhard Schmitz s. v. Comitia ap. William Smith ed. A dictionary of Greek and Roman Antiquities London, 1875.

== Note ==
This article is a translation of the article on the same subject on the Italian Wikipedia. The translator while adhering to the principle of making as few alterations as possible has taken the liberty of improving language, correcting obvious mistakes and adding bibliographic information.
