= Codex Vaticanus 2061 =

Uncial 048
- New Testament manuscript
- Name: Codex Vaticanus 2061
- Sign: ב ^{a, p}
- Text: Acts, GE, Paul †
- Date: 5th century
- Script: Greek
- Now at: Vatican Library
- Size: 30 cm by 27 cm
- Type: Alexandrian text-type
- Category: II

Codex Vaticanus Graecus 2061, usually known as Uncial 048 (in the Gregory-Aland numbering), α1 (Soden), is a Greek uncial manuscript on parchment. It contains some parts of the New Testament, homilies of several authors, and Strabo's Geographica. Formerly it was known also as the Codex Basilianus 100, earlier as Codex Patriniensis 27. It was designated by ב ^{a, p}.

The manuscript has survived in a fragmentary condition. It is a double palimpsest containing parts of seven different literary works. They are written in several types of uncial script. The oldest text is from the 5th century, the youngest from the 10th century.

== Palimpsest ==
The manuscript in some parts is a double palimpsest, with the biblical text having been overwritten twice, resulting in it being very difficult to read. The upper and youngest text contains Homilies of Gregory of Nazianzus from the 10th century, on 316 parchment leaves. The size of the single leaves is 23.5 by 22 cm.

Leaves 254–292 contain a Gospel lectionary of the 7th/8th century, written in uncial letters in a single column, 14 lines per page. Bernard de Montfaucon and Angelo Mai saw the manuscript, but Pierre Batiffol examined it in more detail. Gregory classified it as lectionary 559b on his list of the New Testament manuscripts. At present it is classified under the number ℓ 2321 on the Gregory-Aland list.

Leaves 164, 169, 174, 175, 209, 214, and 217 contain text of a Gospel lectionary from the 8th/9th century, written in square uncial letters, in two columns, 21 lines, size 28.5 by 22 cm. It was classified as lectionary 559a on the list of the New Testament lectionaries. Actually it is classified as ℓ 559 on the list Gregory-Aland. Gregory dated it to the 8th century.

Leaves 138–163, 165–168, 170, 173, 176–178, 203–208, 210–213, 215–220, 223–226, 228, and 231–233 contain text of Homilies from the 9th century, size 25.5 by 17 cm, in leaned uncial letters, two columns per page, and 27 lines per page.

Leaves 234, 236, 238, 239, 241, 243, and 245 contain text of Homilies (of unknown authorship), from the 6th century, written in square uncial letters, size 19.3 by 18.5 cm, in two columns, 22 lines per page.

Leaves 235, 237, 240, 243, 244, 246–249, 251–253, and 310–315 contain text of Strabo's Geographica, from the 6th century, written in leaned uncial letters, size 20.5 by 20.3, in three columns, 38 lines per page. The text was published by Giuseppe Cozza-Luzi in 1884.

Leaves 198, 199, 221, 222, 229, 230, 293–303, and 305–308 contain text of the Acts, Catholic epistles, and Pauline epistles; they are designated as codex 048 on the list Gregory-Aland, α 1070 (von Soden). Scrivener designated it by Hebrew letter ב. It is a Greek uncial manuscript of the New Testament on parchment, dated palaeographically to the 5th century.

== Description of 048 ==
The codex contains the text of the Acts of Apostles, General epistles, and Pauline epistles, in a fragmentary condition. Only 21 parchment leaves – from original 316 – have survived. They constitute folios 198–199, 221–222, 229–230, 293–303, and 305–308 of Vaticanus Graecus 2061. Size of the original pages was 30 cm by 27 cm.

The surviving leaves contain texts (according to Nestle-Aland 26th): Acts 26:6-27:4, 28:3-31; James 4:14-5:20; 1 Peter 1:1-12; 2 Peter 2:4-8, 2:13-3:15; 1 John 4:6-5:13, 5:17-18, 5:21; 2 John; 3 John; Romans 13:4-15:9; 1 Corinthians 2:1-3:11, 3:22, 4:4-6, 5:5-11, 6:3-11, 12:23-15:17, 15:20-27; 2 Corinthians 4:7-6:8, 8:9-18, 8:21-10:6; Ephesians 5:8-end; Philippians 1:8-23, 2:1-4, 2:6-8; Col. 1:2-2:8, 2:11-14, 22-23, 3:7-8, 3:12-4:18; 1 Thessalonians 1:1, 5-6, 1 Timothy 5:6-6:17, 6:20-21, 2 Timothy 1:4-6, 1:8, 2:2-25; Titus 3:13-end; Philemon; Hebrews 11:32-13:4.

The other sources give slightly different contents, because in some parts the manuscript is illegible (according to Batiffol and Gregory the folio 221 of the codex contains text of Acts 26:4-27:10).

Actual order of books: Acts of the Apostles, Catholic epistles, and Pauline epistles (Hebrews after Philemon); but this is not sure. The original order could be different. The titles of biblical books are short, e.g.: Προς Θεσσαλονικεις α, Ιωαννου β.

The text is written in three columns per page, 40–41 lines per page, 12–15 letters per line. The letters are square and round. The initial letters are not much bigger and they are not written at the margin before the column. It has not breathings and accents, also there is no diaeresis, over the letters ι and υ, usually used in other manuscripts frequently. It lacks the Euthalian Apparatus, and this is evidence for the early dating of the manuscript. Only in some places are given marks for liturgical readings.

The manuscript is one of the very few New Testament manuscripts to be written with three columns per page. The other two Greek codices written in that way are Codex Vaticanus (Uncial B/03) and Uncial 053. The trilingual minuscule codex 460 is, naturally, also in three columns (one per language).

The nomina sacra are written in an abbreviated way (Θ̅Σ̅, Ι̅Σ̅, Χ̅Σ̅, Π̅Ν̅Α̅, etc.). The words written at the end of line are also abbreviated. At the margin to Romans 15:1 is written Κ Ζ ΜΕΤΑ Τ Π, it means "The seventh Sunday after the Pentecost". In the Byzantine Synaxarion the lesson of Romans 15:1-7 is read in this Sunday.

== Text of 048 ==
The Greek text of this codex is not clearly identified, but the Alexandrian element is stronger than the Byzantine, with some the Western readings. Hermann von Soden did not classify it at all. According to Frederic G. Kenyon its text is close to the Codex Alexandrinus.

Kurt Aland placed it in Category II, but this assessment was based on only 44 readings in Pauline epistles. In 1 Timothy – Philemon it has the Western text-type.

In Acts 26:6 it reads εις (to) for προς (toward);

In Acts 26:14 it reads λεγουσαν προς με for λαλουσαν προς με;

In Acts 26:15 it reads Ιησους ο Ναζωραιος for Ιησους; the reading of the codex is supported by minuscule 6, 104, 614, 1175, Codex Gigas, some manuscripts of Vulgate, syr^{p.h};

In Acts 26:28 it reads ποιησαι for γενεσθαι; the reading is supported by Papyrus 74, Sinaiticus, Alexandrinus, Vaticanus, 33, 81, 1175 and several other manuscripts;

In Acts 28:14 it reads παρ for επ;

In Acts 28:16 it reads επετραπη τω Παυλω; majority of manuscripts reads for ο εκατονταρχος παρεδωκεν τους δεσμιους τω στρατοπεδαρχω, το δε Παυλω επετραπη;

In Acts 28:23 it reads ηλθον for ηκον;

In Acts 28:29 it does not have reading of majority και ταυτα αυτου ειποντος απηλθον οι Ιουδαιοι πολλην εχοντης εν εαυτοις συζητησιν (And when he had said these words, the Jews departed and had a great dispute among themselves); the omission is supported by a manuscripts Papyrus 74, Codex Sinaiticus, Alexandrinus, Vaticanus, Codex Laudianus, Codex Athous Lavrensis, 33, 81, 1175, 1739, 2464;

In Romans 13:9 it has additional phrase ου ψευδομαρτυρησεις, the reading is supported by the manuscripts: א (P) 81 104 365 1506 a b vg^{cl} (syr^{h}) cop^{bo}

In Romans 14:3 it reads ο δε along with Alexandrian manuscripts, the majority reads και ο;

In Romans 14:4 it reads θεος along with Byzantine manuscripts, the Alexandrian manuscripts (א A B C P Ψ) read κυριος;

In Romans 14:10 it reads Χριστου along with Ψ, Uncial 0209, and the Byzantine manuscripts; the Alexandrian and Western manuscripts (א A B C D F G 630 1506 1739) read θεου;

In Romans 14:21 it lacks reading of the Byzantine text η σκανδαλιζεται η ασθενει;

In Romans 15:2 it reads υμων for ημων;

In Romans 15:4 it supports the Byzantine reading προεγραφη, the Alexandrian and Western manuscripts read εγραφη;

In Romans 15:5 it reads Ιησουν Χριστον; B, D, G, Ψ, and the majority of manuscripts read Χριστον Ιησουν;

In Romans 15:7 it reads και ο Χριστος προσελαβετο ημας εις δοξαν του θεου for και ο Χριστος προσελαβετο υμας εις δοξαν του θεου; the reading is supported by Codex Vaticanus, Codex Claromontanus, Codex Porphyrianus, 104, 614, 629, 1506, cop^{sa}.

In Romans 15:8 it reads γεγενησθαι along with Sinaiticus, Alexandrinus, and the Byzantine manuscripts; B C D F G Ψ 630 1739 1881 read γενεσθαι;

In 1 Corinthians 3:4 it reads ουκ ανθρωποι along with Papyrus 46, Sinaiticus, Alexandrinus, Vaticanus, Ephraemi, 33, 81, 1175, 1506, 1739, 1881; Sinaiticus², Ψ, and the Byzantine manuscripts read ουχι σαρκικοι; D F G 629 read ουχι ανθρωποι;

In 1 Corinthians 15:7 it reads επειτα for ειτα, the reading is supported by p^{46}, Sinaiticus, Alexandrinus, F, G, K, 0243, 33, 81, 614, 630, 1175, 1739, 1881;

In 2 Corinthians 12:4 it reads λεγω (I speak) for λεγωμεν (we speak), along with the manuscript Papyrus 46, Ephraemi, Claromontanus, F, G.

== History ==
Scrivener and Gregory dated the manuscript to the 5th century.

Formerly it was held in the monastery of St. Mary of Patirium, a suburb of Rossano in Calabria, whence it was taken about the end of the 17th century to the Vatican. Here it was rediscovered by Pierre Batiffol in 1887.

The manuscript was examined by Bernard de Montfaucon; Vitaliano Donati examined it for Giuseppe Bianchini. Cardinal Angelo Mai noticed this manuscript and used it in Prolegomena of his edition of Codex Vaticanus Graecus 1209.

According to Gregory it is an important palimpsest of the New Testament. The codex was cited in Novum Testamentum Graece of Nestle-Aland (27th edition).

The codex now is located in the Vatican Library (Gr. 2061).

== See also ==
- List of New Testament uncials
- Textual criticism
- Biblical manuscript
- Codex Vaticanus 2066
- Codex Vaticanus 354
- British Library, Add. 17212 – double palimpsest
