= Gaius Poetelius Libo Visolus =

4th century BC Roman consul and general

Gaius Poetelius Libo Visolus was a Roman politician and general who lived in the mid-fourth century BC and served multiple times as consul.

== Family ==
Poetelius was a member of the plebeian Poetelia gens, a family which had previously had no consuls but did have one decemvir named Quintus Poetelius Libo Visolus. As revealed by filiation, the father of Poetelius was named Gaius, his grandfather was named Quintus, and he had one known son, Gaius Poetelius Libo Visolus, who was dictator in 313 BC and possibly consul in 326 BC as well.

== First consulship and tribuneship ==
In 360 BC, Poetelius was elected to his first consulship along with a patrician, Marcus Fabius Ambustus. In that year Rome was at war with the city of Tibur, which had allied itself with the Gauls against Rome the year before. The senate tasked Poetelius with subduing the Tiburites, and his colleague Ambustus, the Hernici. While Poetelius laid siege to Tibur, news arrived in Rome that the Gauls, who had fled to Campania, were returning for a second assault on Rome. The senate appointed Quintus Servilius Ahala dictator with the sole responsibility of defeating the Gallic army. Ahala brought to arms all young men who were not assigned to the army of either consul, with no exceptions, and fought a battle against the Gauls just outside the city, which, though long and hard-fought, eventually brought victory to the Romans. The Gauls fled in defeat towards Tibur, where Poetelius easily defeated them along with the Tiburites, who tried to help them. Ahala then resigned his dictatorship and Poetelius returned to Rome to celebrate his triumphs over Tibur and the Gauls.

In 358 BC Poetelius was elected as Tribune of the plebs, a position with a great deal of power to create and veto laws, and a position only available to plebeians. During his term of office, Poetelius proposed a law against electoral bribery, a proposition whole-heartedly confirmed by the still mostly patrician senate, which believed that the law might hamper prospective plebeian candidates for consular office.

== Second and possible third term as consul ==
In 346 BC, Poetelius served as consul for a second time, with patrician Marcus Valerius Corvus. In that year Rome waged war against the Volscians, however only Valerius is mentioned in relation to this. This probably indicates that Poetelius undertook civil duties during his consulate.

In 326 BC, Poetelius may have served as consul for a third time, alongside Lucius Papirius Cursor, and helped to pass the Lex Poetelia Papiria, which outlawed the nexum, a type of debt bondage previously used in Ancient Rome. However it is very possible that the Poetelius of 326 was not this Poetelius, but his son, who later also served as dictator in 313 BC. This confusion stems from vague sources; also, the Fasti Capitolini, which records both the names and filiations of Roman consuls, is missing for this year. A default assumption that the elder Poetelius was consul in this year defies chronology. In 326 BC, it had been twenty years since Poetelius' previous consulship and thirty four years since his first. Considering the age when men usually achieved their first consulship, this would likely make Poetelius a very old man in 326. For this reason, the classicist Friedrich Münzer argued that the consul in 326 BC was not the elder Poetelius but instead his son.

== Bibliography ==
- Broughton, T. Robert S., The Magistrates of the Roman Republic, American Philological Association (1952)
- Livy (Titus Livius), Ab Urbe Condita Libri
