= Granius Licinianus =

Roman writer

- Occupations: Historian, writer
- Writing career
- Period: 2nd century AD
- Genres: Roman history, antiquarian literature
- Notable works: History, Cenae Suae

Granius Licinianus (active in the 2nd century AD) was a Roman author of historical and encyclopedic works that survive only in fragments. He most likely lived at the time of Hadrian.

== History ==
Granius compiled a "novel" narrative epitome of Roman history, drawing mainly on Livy and Sallust, that ran to at least 36 books, "keen on anecdotes and curious details." That he had his own views on historiography should not be doubted: in his opinion, Sallust ought not to be read as an historian at all, but as an orator. Granius covered the history of Rome from the early times at least to the death of Julius Caesar; the assumption of this as an end-point of his history has sometimes caused him to be identified with Granius Flaccus and his life to be dated to the 1st century BC. Though riddled with lacunae, Granius's Book 35 presents one of the most informative accounts of the siege of Rome during the civil war of 87 BC, and his history regularly provides illuminative details that complement more complete histories. Some fragments of the books relating to the years 163-78 BC are preserved in a manuscript which was discovered in 1853 and survives as a double palimpsest, that is, a 5th-century copy was overwritten in the 6th century with a Latin grammatical treatise and again in the 11th century with a Syriac translation of John Chrysostom's sermons. (Add. 17212)

Granius also wrote Cenae Suae ("My Dinner Parties"), an encyclopedic work that displayed his antiquarian interests in the manner of Aulus Gellius and his Attic Nights.

== Editions ==
- K.A. Pertz (1857), editio princeps; downloadable.
- Seven Bonn students (1858)
- M. Flemisch, Granius Licinianus. Eine text-, sprach- und quellenkritische Untersuchung (1899/1900, 1902, 1904)
- See also JN Madvig, Kleine philologische Schriften (1875)
- N. Criniti (Leipzig, 1981). For introduction, critical commentary (in Italian), and full bibliography, see also Criniti's "Granio Liciniano," Aufstieg und Niedergang der römischen Welt 2.34.1 (1993), pp. 120–, limited preview online.

== Commentary ==
- Italian translation and commentary by B. Scardigli, with A. R. Berardi (Florence, 1983).
