= Lex Poetelia Papiria =

Roman 4th century BC law

The lex Poetelia Papiria was a law passed in Ancient Rome that abolished the contractual form of nexum, or debt bondage. Livy dates the law in 326 BC, during the third consulship of Gaius Poetelius Libo Visolus, but Varro dates the law in 313 BC, during the dictatorship of Poetelius's son.

== See also ==
- Roman law
- List of Roman laws
