= Battle of Fidenae (437 BC) =

Battle between the forces of Rome and Fidenae and Veii

- Part of Roman–Etruscan Wars
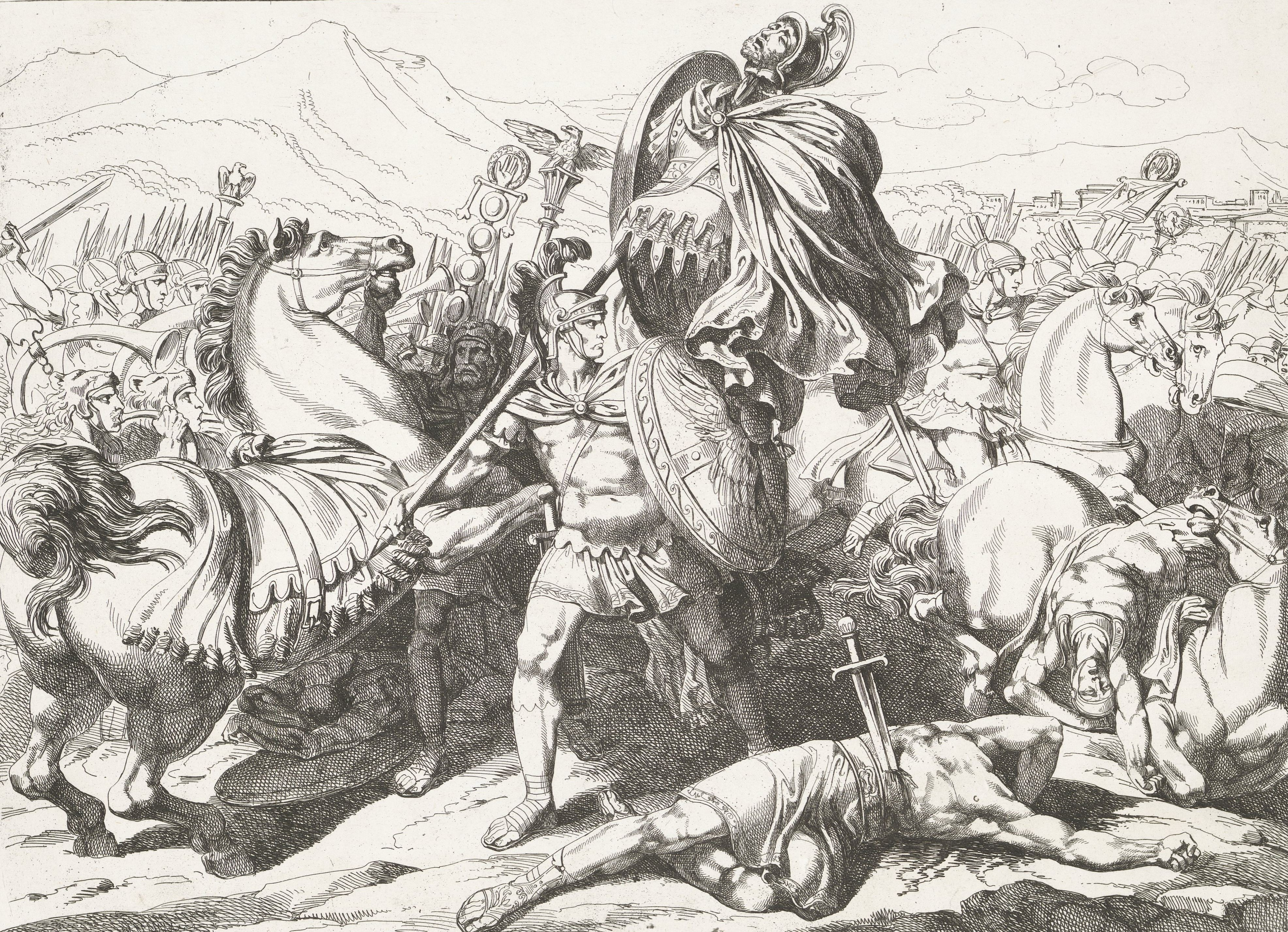
- Aulus Cornelius Cossus carries the head of the Etruscan king Lars Tolumnius, 1818 engraving by Bartolomeo Pinelli
Date	437 BC
Location	Anio River and Fidenae
Result	Roman victory

Belligerents
Roman Republic	Fidenae; Veii

Commanders and leaders
Mamercus Aemilius Mamercinus; Lucius Quinctius L. f. L. n. Cincinnatus; Lucius Sergius Fidenas	Lars Tolumnius

The Battle of Fidenae was fought in 437 BC between the Roman Republic, led by the dictator Mamercus Aemilius Mamercinus, and the combined forces of Fidenae and Veii, led by Lars Tolumnius.

== Background ==
In 438 BC, the Roman colony of Fidenae revolted against the Roman Republic and allied itself instead with Veii. The Senate appointed Tullus Cloelius, Gaius Fulcinius, Spurius Antius, and Lucius Roscius to enquire into the motives behind the revolt. All four envoys were killed in Fidenae on Tolumnius' orders; one historical tradition calls this an accident, saying that the Fidenates mistook a lucky dice roll by Tolumnius as an order to kill their Roman visitors. The historian Livy doubts the legitimacy of this story, suggesting that Tolumnius, whose interests were not served by the reunion of Rome and Fidenae, deliberately inflamed the conflict between the two cities.

== Battle of the Anio River ==
After the death of its envoys, Rome sent an army to Fidenae under the consul Lucius Sergius Fidenas. He met the combined forces of Fidenae and Veii on the southern shores of the Anio River and fought a bloody and indecisive battle, where the eventual Roman victory was overshadowed by the great loss of life required to obtain it.

== Battle of Fidenae ==
Dissatisfied with the outcome of the first battle, the Romans appointed Mamercus Aemilius Mamercinus to conduct the war as dictator. He chose Lucius Quinctius L. f. L. n. Cincinnatus as his magister equitum and Titus Quinctius Capitolinus Barbatus and Marcus Fabius Vibulanus as his lieutenant-generals.

News of Mamercinus' appointment caused the enemy to return to the northern shore of the Anio and take up a defensive position in the hills between Fidenae and the river. It was not until the Faliscians came to their aid that they moved back to Fidenae itself, encamping outside the walls. The dictator crossed the Anio and approached Fidenae, where a dispute began amongst the defenders. The Fidenates and Veientes favored cautious tactics that would prolong the war, while the Faliscians wanted a decisive battle. Tolumnius took the latter approach, concerned that doing otherwise would make the Faliscians withdraw their support. When Mamercinus arrived, the three armies lined up and waited for him to engage first. The Roman cavalry, led by Quinctius, was the first to advance, followed by the infantry. They met the most resistance from enemy cavalry, led by Tolumnius himself; when he was unhorsed and killed by Aulus Cornelius Cossus, the enemy began to lose morale. The cavalry was routed, and the Romans advanced into the enemy camp.

Prior to the battle, Tolumnius had sent a detachment around the nearby hills in order to sabotage the Roman camp behind their lines. The camp was successfully defended by the lieutenant-general Marcus Fabius Vibulanus.

== Aftermath ==
Mamercinus returned to Rome in triumph, during which Cossus was also honored for having slain the Etruscan king. The armour of Tolumnius was placed in the Temple of Jupiter Feretrius, where, according to tradition, Romulus had also dedicated spoils taken from an enemy king. Fidenae was captured by the dictator Quintus Servilius Priscus Structus Fidenas two years later.
