= Roscia gens =

Ancient Roman family

The gens Roscia (Rōscia), probably the same as Ruscia, was a plebeian family at ancient Rome. Members of this gens are mentioned as early as the fifth century BC, but after this time they vanish into obscurity until the final century of the Republic. A number of Roscii rose to prominence in imperial times, with some attaining the consulship from the first to the third centuries.

== Origin ==
The nomen Roscius is of uncertain origin; Chase suggests a possible derivation from roscidus, dewy or sprinkled with dew, and classifies the name with those that either originated at Rome, or cannot be shown to have come from anywhere else. The first of the Roscii appearing in history was a Roman ambassador, but the later Roscii may have been provincials; there was an important family of this name at Ameria, an Umbrian town not far from the border of Latium, which held the status of a municipium, and perhaps acquired Roman citizenship as early as 338 BC, at the conclusion of the Latin War.

== Praenomina ==
The main praenomina of the Roscii were Lucius, Marcus, Quintus, Sextus, and Titus.

== Branches and cognomina ==
The cognomina of the Roscii during the Republic were Fabatus and Otho. Fabatus seems to be derived from faba, a bean, also the root of the nomen Fabia, and suggests that the ancestors of the Roscii were engaged in agriculture. Otho is better known as a surname of the Salvia gens. Gallus, a cockerel, appears in a commentary on Cicero as a surname of the actor Quintus Roscius, but the name is not found in other sources. Other cognomina of the Roscii include Capito, indicating someone with a large head; Magnus, great; and Regulus, a prince, a diminutive of rex, a king.

In imperial times two distinct families of the Roscii came to prominence; one bearing the surname Murena, an lamprey, well known from a family of the Licinii. This family flourished in the late first and early second centuries, and one of them bore the additional surname Lupus, a wolf. The other stirps bore the cognomen Aelianus, probably indicating descent from a family of the Aelii through the female line. This family obtained several consulships beginning at the end of the first century, and continuing into the third.

== Members ==
This list includes abbreviated praenomina. For an explanation of this practice, see filiation.

- Lucius Roscius, one of four Roman ambassadors sent to Fidenae in 438 BC, who were put to death by Lars Tolumnius, King of Veii. Statues of the four were erected in the Roman forum, where they were later incorporated into the Rostra.
- Sextus Roscius, a wealthy farmer and resident of Ameria, was murdered at Rome by assassins hired by his cousin, Titus Roscius Magnus.
- Sextus Roscius Sex. f., a resident of Ameria, whom Cicero successfully defended on a charge of patricide in 80 BC.
- Titus Roscius Magnus, a relative and neighbor of the elder Sextus Roscius, who procured Sextus' murder in order to acquire his fortune, and had his son, the younger Sextus, proscribed. When the latter escaped death, Magnus and his co-conspirator, Titus Roscius Capito, accused Sextus of his father's murder.
- Titus Roscius Capito, a relative and neighbor of Sextus Roscius, who conspired with Titus Roscius Magnus to obtain his cousin's fortune. He acquired three farms from Sextus' estate.
- Quintus Roscius, possibly surnamed Gallus, a native of Solonium, near Lanuvium, was an illustrious comic actor during the early part of the first century BC, and became wealthy through his talents, which although well-rehearsed gave the illusion of being natural and unaffected. Cicero, who had been a pupil of Roscius, later defended him in a lawsuit over 50,000 sestertii, part of as sum previously awarded over a murdered slave.
- Roscia, the sister of Quintus Roscius, the comic actor, married a certain Quinctius, whom Cicero defended in his oration, Pro Quinctio.
- Lucius Roscius Otho, tribune of the plebs in 67 BC, opposed the granting of proconsular power to Pompeius, who was sent to clear the Mediterranean of pirates. He also brought forward an unpopular law awarding fourteen rows of seats to the equites at public arenas.
- Roscius, the name of two brothers who joined Crassus on his expedition against the Parthians.
- Lucius Roscius Fabatus, one of Caesar's officers during the Gallic War, held the lower Rhine with the thirteenth legion at a time when other parts of Gaul were in revolt. praetor in 49, he served as an intermediary between Caesar and Pompeius, delivering several messages back and forth. Roscius was mortally wounded at the Battle of Forum Gallorum in 43 BC.
- Roscius, the legate of Quintus Cornificius in Africa in 43 BC. Both were slain in battle against Titus Sextius, who had been ordered to take charge of the province by the triumvirs.
- Marcus Roscius Coelius, (Note: Or Caelius.) legate of the twentieth legion, was serving in Britain in AD 68, when the emperor Nero died. Vespasian sent Julius Agricola to replace him. Roscius was consul suffectus in AD 81, serving from the Kalends of March to the Kalends of May.
- Roscius Regulus, (Note: Or Rosius Regulus.) appointed consul suffectus for one day in AD 69, holding the fasces on October 31 in the place of Aulus Caecina Alienus.

=== Roscii Murenae ===
- Quintus Roscius Murena, the adoptive father of Pompeius Falco. He may have been related to Marcus Roscius Coelius, the consul of AD 81, but precisely how is unclear.
- Quintus Roscius Sex. f. Coelius Murena Silius Decianus Vibullius Pius Julius Eurycles Herculanus Pompeius Falco, (Note: Evidently the son of Sextus Pompeius Falco, he was apparently adopted by a Quintus Roscius.) was governor of Lycia and Pamphylia, then of Judaea. He was consul in 108, from the Kalends of September to the end of the year, and subsequently governor of Lower Moesia, then of Asia.
- Quintus Pompeius Q. f. Sex. n. [...] Bellicus Sollers Iulius Acer Ducenius Proculus Rutilianus Rufinus Silius Valens Valerius Niger Claudius Fuscus Saxa Amyntianus Sosius Priscus, consul in AD 149, and subsequently governor of Asia.
- Quintus Pompeius Q. f. Q. n. Senecio Roscius Murena Coelius Sextus Iulius Frontinus Silius Decianus Gaius Iulius Eurycles Herculaneus Lucius Vibullius Pius Augustanus Alpinus Bellicius Sollers Iulius Aper Ducenius Proculus Rutilianus Rufinus Silius Valens Valerius Niger Claudius Fuscus Saxa Amyntianus Sosius Priscus, quaestor, legate under his father in Asia, praetor, consul in AD 169, and subsequently governor of Asia.
- Marcus Roscius Murena, proconsul of Bithynia and Pontus around 161/162.
- Marcus Roscius M. f. Murena, son of the preceding, held the praetorship, but precisely when is unknown.
- Marcus Roscius M. f. M. n. Lupus Murena, son of the preceding. He was one of the septemviri epulones, tribune of the seventh legion, prefect of the fourth legion, and governor of Crete and Cyrenaica.

=== Roscii Aeliani ===
- Lucius Roscius M. f. Aelianus Maecius Celer, consul suffectus in AD 100, serving from the Kalends of November to the end of the year. He had previously been one of the decemviri stlitibus judicandis, quaestor, tribune of the plebs, and praetor.
- Lucius Roscius Aelianus, consul suffectus in AD 157, probably serving from the Kalends of April to the Kalends of June.
- Lucius Roscius (L. f.) Aelianus Paculus, consul in AD 187, was one of the Salii Palatini, and had been appointed flamen in 170.
- Lucius Roscius (L. f. L. n.) Aelianus Paculus Salvius Julianus, consul in AD 223.

== See also ==
- List of Roman gentes

== Bibliography ==
Ancient sources

- Marcus Tullius Cicero, Brutus, De Divinatione, De Legibus, De Officiis, De Oratore, Epistulae ad Atticum, Epistulae ad Familiares, Philippicae, Pro Murena, Pro Quinctio, Pro Quinto Roscio Comoedo, Pro Sexto Roscio Amerino.
- Gaius Julius Caesar, Commentarii de Bello Civili (Commentaries on the Civil War), Commentarii de Bello Gallico (Commentaries on the Gallic War).
- Quintus Horatius Flaccus (Horace), Epistulae, Epodes.
- Titus Livius (Livy), History of Rome.
- Marcus Velleius Paterculus, Compendium of Roman History.
- Valerius Maximus, Factorum ac Dictorum Memorabilium (Memorable Facts and Sayings).
- Gaius Plinius Secundus (Pliny the Elder), Historia Naturalis (Natural History).
- Decimus Junius Juvenalis, Satirae (Satires).
- Publius Cornelius Tacitus, Annales, Historiae, De Vita et Moribus Iulii Agricolae (On the Life and Mores of Julius Agricola).
- Lucius Mestrius Plutarchus (Plutarch), Lives of the Noble Greeks and Romans.
- Appianus Alexandrinus (Appian), Bellum Civile (The Civil War).
- Lucius Cassius Dio Cocceianus (Cassius Dio), Roman History.
- Ambrosius Theodosius Macrobius, Saturnalia.
- Scholia Bobiensia (Bobbio Scholiast), In Ciceronis Pro Archia Poëta (Commentary on Cicero's Oration Pro Archia Poëta).

Modern sources

- Dictionary of Greek and Roman Biography and Mythology, William Smith, ed., Little, Brown and Company, Boston (1849).
- Dictionary of Greek and Roman Geography, William Smith, ed., Little, Brown and Company, Boston (1854).
- Paul von Rohden, Elimar Klebs, & Hermann Dessau, Prosopographia Imperii Romani ("The Prosopography of the Roman Empire", abbreviated PIR), Berlin (1898).
- John C. Traupman, The New College Latin & English Dictionary, Bantam Books, New York (1995).
- Géza Alföldy, Konsulat und Senatorenstand unter der Antonien (The Consulate and Senatorial State under the Antonines), Rudolf Habelt, Bonn (1977).
- T. Robert S. Broughton, The Magistrates of the Roman Republic, American Philological Association (1952).
- George Davis Chase, "The Origin of Roman Praenomina", in Harvard Studies in Classical Philology, vol. VIII, pp. 103–184 (1897).
- Wilhelm Drumann, Geschichte Roms in seinem Übergang von der republikanischen zur monarchischen Verfassung, oder: Pompeius, Caesar, Cicero und ihre Zeitgenossen, Königsberg (1834–1844).
- Werner Eck, "Die Fasti consulares der Regierungszeit des Antoninus Pius, eine Bestandsaufnahme seit Géza Alföldys Konsulat und Senatorenstand" ("The Consular Fasti for the Reign of Antoninus Pius: an Inventory since Géza Alföldy's Konsulat und Senatorenstand"), in Studia Epigraphica in Memoriam Géza Alföldy, Werner Eck, Bence Fehér, Péter Kovács, eds., Bonn, pp. 69–90 (2013).
- Paul A. Gallivan, "The Fasti for A.D. 70–96", in Classical Quarterly, vol. 31, pp. 186–220 (1981).
- Paul M. M. Leunissen, Konsuln und Konsulare in der Zeit von Commodus bis Severus Alexander, Verlag Gieben, Amsterdam, (1989).
- Olli Salomies, Adoptive and Polyonymous Nomenclature in the Roman Empire, Societas Scientiarum Fennica, Helsinki (1992).
- Benet Salway, "What’s in a Name? A Survey of Roman Onomastic Practice from c. 700 B.C. to A.D. 700", in Journal of Roman Studies, vol. 84, pp. 124–145 (1994).
