= Fulcinia gens =

The gens Fulcinia was a minor plebeian family at ancient Rome. The first of this name to appear in history is Gaius Fulcinius, one of the ambassadors to Fidenae in 438 BC. After this, no Fulcinius is mentioned until the time of Cicero. Several Fulcinii are known from the first century BC, although it is not clear whether or how they were related to the ambassador.

== Origin ==
The nomen Fulcinius belongs to a class of gentilicia formed from cognomina ending in the diminutive suffix -inus. The root, Fulcina, seems to be related to the Latin fulcire, "to support", "maintain", or "prop up".

== Praenomina ==
The chief praenomina of the Fulcinii were Gaius, Marcus, and Lucius, all of which were amongst the most common names throughout Roman history.

== Members ==
This list includes abbreviated praenomina. For an explanation of this practice, see filiation.

- Gaius Fulcinius, one of the four ambassadors sent to Fidenae in 438 BC to learn the reasons for that city's revolt. Lars Tolumnius, the king of Veii, who had encouraged the revolt, advised the Fidenates to put the ambassadors to death. Fulcinius and his colleagues were subsequently honoured with statues on the Rostra.
- Marcus Fulcinius, a native of Tarquinii in Etruria, was a successful banker at Rome, whom Cicero described as eminently respectable.
- Marcus Fulcinius M. f., son of the banker Marcus, died young.
- Marcus Fulcinius, a freedman of the banker Marcus Fulcinius.
- Lucius Fulcinius, a quaestor serving under Quintus Caecilius Metellus Macedonicus in Macedonia in 148 BC, is named on Macedonian coins.
- Gaius Fulcinius, the father of Lucius, who charged Marcus Saufeius with murder.
- Lucius Fulcinius C. f., brought a charge of murder against Marcus Saufeius in BC 52.
- Lucius Fulcinius Trio, consul in AD 31, and an ally of Sejanus, whose downfall occurred that year. An infamous delator, he had accused Lucius Scribonius Libo, the consul of AD 16, and in 20 accused Gnaeus Calpurnius Piso of having poisoned Germanicus. For a time, Fulcinius avoided the fate of Sejanus by prosecuting his accomplices, but in AD 35 he was likewise accused and imprisoned, escaping condemnation by taking his own life. Fulcinius' will excoriated Tiberius, Macro, and several of the emperor's freedmen.
- Marcus Fulcinius, the father of Gaius Fulcinius, a magistrate of Cartenna, was perhaps the first to migrate to Mauretania.
- Gaius Fulcinius M. f. Quirinius Optatus, a magistrate of Cartenna, and flamen of the imperial cult, played a role in the defense of the city during the second century.
- Gaius Fulcinius C. f. M. n. Optatus, the son of Quirinius Optatus, was a member of the equestrian order sometime between AD 120 and 150.
- Gaius Fulcinius C. f. C. n. Fabius Maximus Optatus, son of the eques Optatus, and grandson of Quirinius, was a Roman senator, and governor of Hispania Baetica in the late second century.

== See also ==
- List of Roman gentes

== Bibliography ==
- Marcus Tullius Cicero, Philippicae, Pro Caecina.
- Titus Livius (Livy), History of Rome.
- Quintus Asconius Pedianus, Commentarius in Oratio Ciceronis Pro Milone (Commentary on Cicero's Oration Pro Milone).
- Publius Cornelius Tacitus, Annales.
- Lucius Cassius Dio Cocceianus (Cassius Dio), Roman History.
- Joseph Hilarius Eckhel, Doctrina Numorum Veterum (The Study of Ancient Coins, 1792–1798).
- Dictionary of Greek and Roman Biography and Mythology, William Smith, ed., Little, Brown and Company, Boston (1849).
- George Davis Chase, "The Origin of Roman Praenomina", in Harvard Studies in Classical Philology, vol. VIII, pp. 103–184 (1897).
- T. Robert S. Broughton, The Magistrates of the Roman Republic, American Philological Association (1952–1986).
- John C. Traupman, The New College Latin & English Dictionary, Bantam Books, New York (1995).
- John Ferguson, Africa in Classical Antiquity: Nine Studies, University of Michigan (1969).
