= Tullus Cloelius =

5th-century BC Roman diplomat

Tullus Cloelius or Cluilius, called Cloelius Tullus in some sources, was a Roman envoy to Fidenae. He and his fellow envoys Gaius Fulcinius, Spurius Antius, and Lucius Roscius were dispatched in the year 438 B.C., tasked with investigating the reasons for Fidenae's alliance with Veii. All four were murdered on the orders of the Veientine king, Lars Tolumnius. Statues of the slain ambassadors were then erected at the public expense outside the Rostra in Rome, and the following year, Rome declared war against Veii in response to the incident.

== See also ==
- Cloelia gens
