= Antia =

Antia may refer to:

- Antia gens, a Roman gens
- Antía, a female given name
- Noshir H. Antia, an Indian plastic surgeon

== See also ==
- Antius (disambiguation)
