= Antius =

Antius may refer to a number of people or things:

- Antiu, a people of ancient Egypt
- Antia (gens), a family of ancient Romans with the name Antius
- Antius, Spain, a singular population entity in Callús, Spain
