= Forum of Augustus =

Ancient Roman imperial forum in Rome

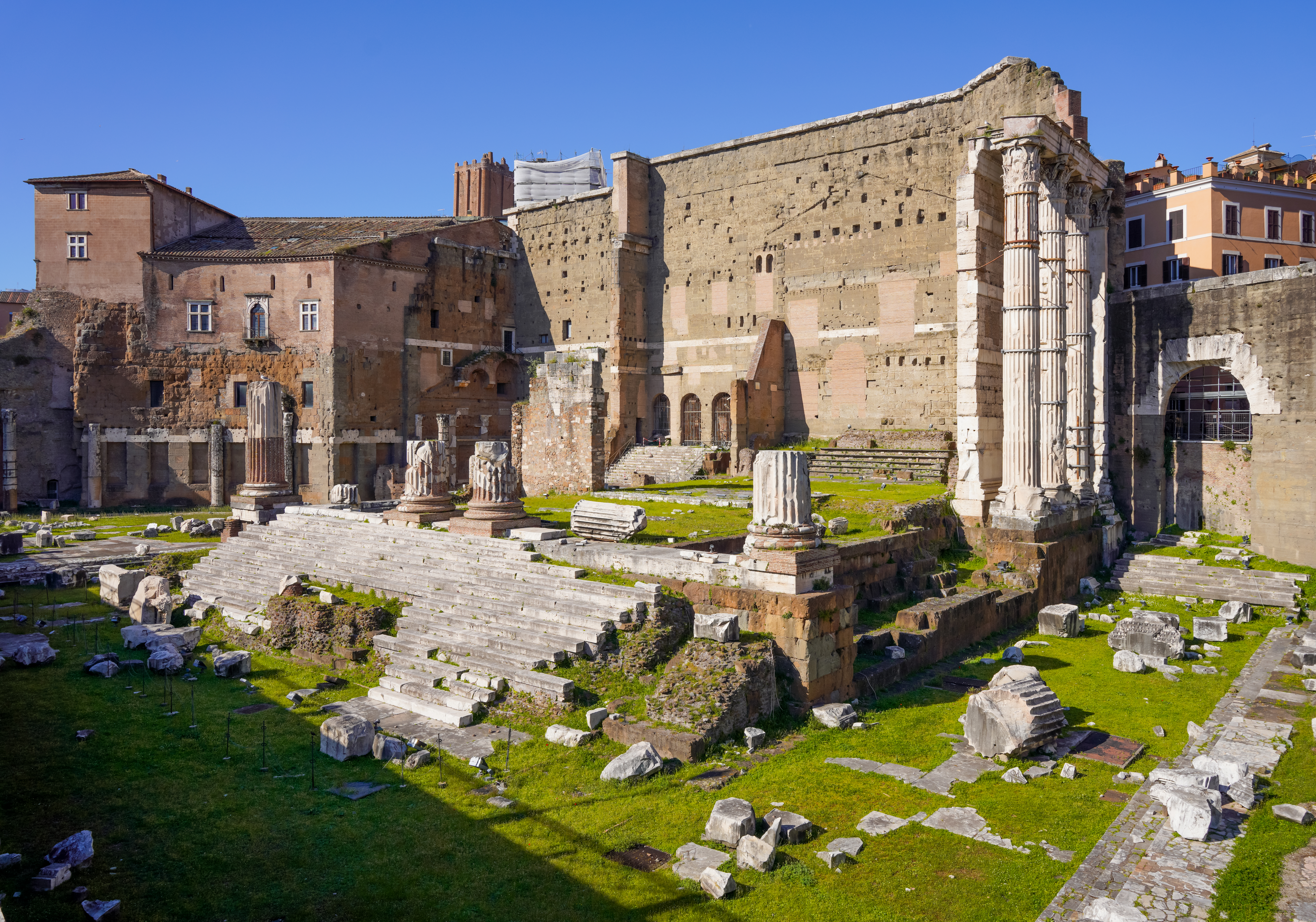
- Remains of the Forum of Augustus with the Temple of Mars Ultor.

- Shown within Augustan Rome
- Interactive map of Forum of Augustus
- 41°53′39″N 12°29′12″E

The Forum of Augustus (Latin: Forum Augustum; Italian: Foro di Augusto) is one of the Imperial fora of Rome, Italy, built by Augustus (r. 27 BC – AD 14). It includes the Temple of Mars Ultor. The incomplete forum and its temple were inaugurated in 2 BC, 40 years after they were first vowed.

== History ==
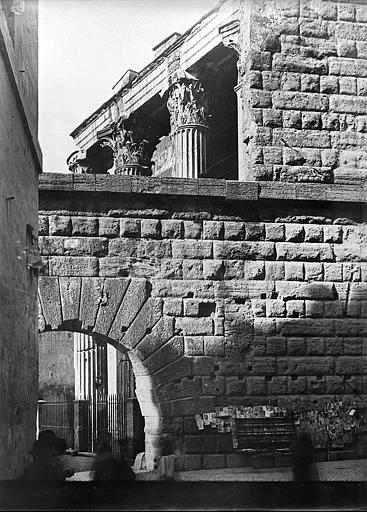
The fireproof wall with Arco dei Pantani and the columns of the temple.

The triumvir Octavian vowed to build a temple honoring Mars, the Roman God of War, during the battle of Philippi in 42 BC. After winning the battle, with the help of Mark Antony and Lepidus, Octavian had avenged the assassination of his adoptive father Julius Caesar. He became the Princeps of Rome in 27 BC under the name Augustus, and planned for the temple to be built in a new forum named after himself. Augustus used social propaganda by continuing Julius Caesar's will to create a Temple to Mars Ultor "the avenger," by placing it within the Temple, linking himself to his divine adopted father, obtaining a strong link to the Roman population through their love for the deceased dictator.

The majority of the land that the Forum was to be built on was already owned by Augustus himself. However, the initial plans called for more space than he had and would have required him to purchase or expropriate further land. Instead, the plans were altered slightly, so some asymmetry is apparent, especially in the Eastern corner of the precinct. Suetonius states that Augustus did not want to take the houses of the nearby owners by force. These land issues, as well as numerous architectural mishaps, prolonged construction. The incomplete forum and its temple were inaugurated, 40 years after they were first vowed, in 2 BC. In 19 AD Tiberius added two triumphal arches either side of the temple in honour of Drusus the Younger and Germanicus and their victories in Germania.

With the dedication of the Forum of Trajan in 112 AD, the number of inscriptions found in the Forum of Augustus decline, which suggests that many of its functions were transferred to the new venue, although Hadrian made some repairs. The educational and cultural use of the exedrae were recorded in the late antiquity. The last reference to the forum dates to 395 AD. Archaeological data indicates that the structures were systematically dismantled in the first half of the 6th century, probably because it was seriously damaged in an earthquake or during the wars. The Forum of Augustus was among the first of the great public buildings of Rome which disappeared that also explains the rapid loss of the memory of its original name. In the 9th century a Basilian monastery was erected on the podium of the ruined temple. By the 10th century, the forum had become so congested with ruins and vegetation, that the locals had given it the name Hortus mirabilis (the wonderful garden).

== Usage ==
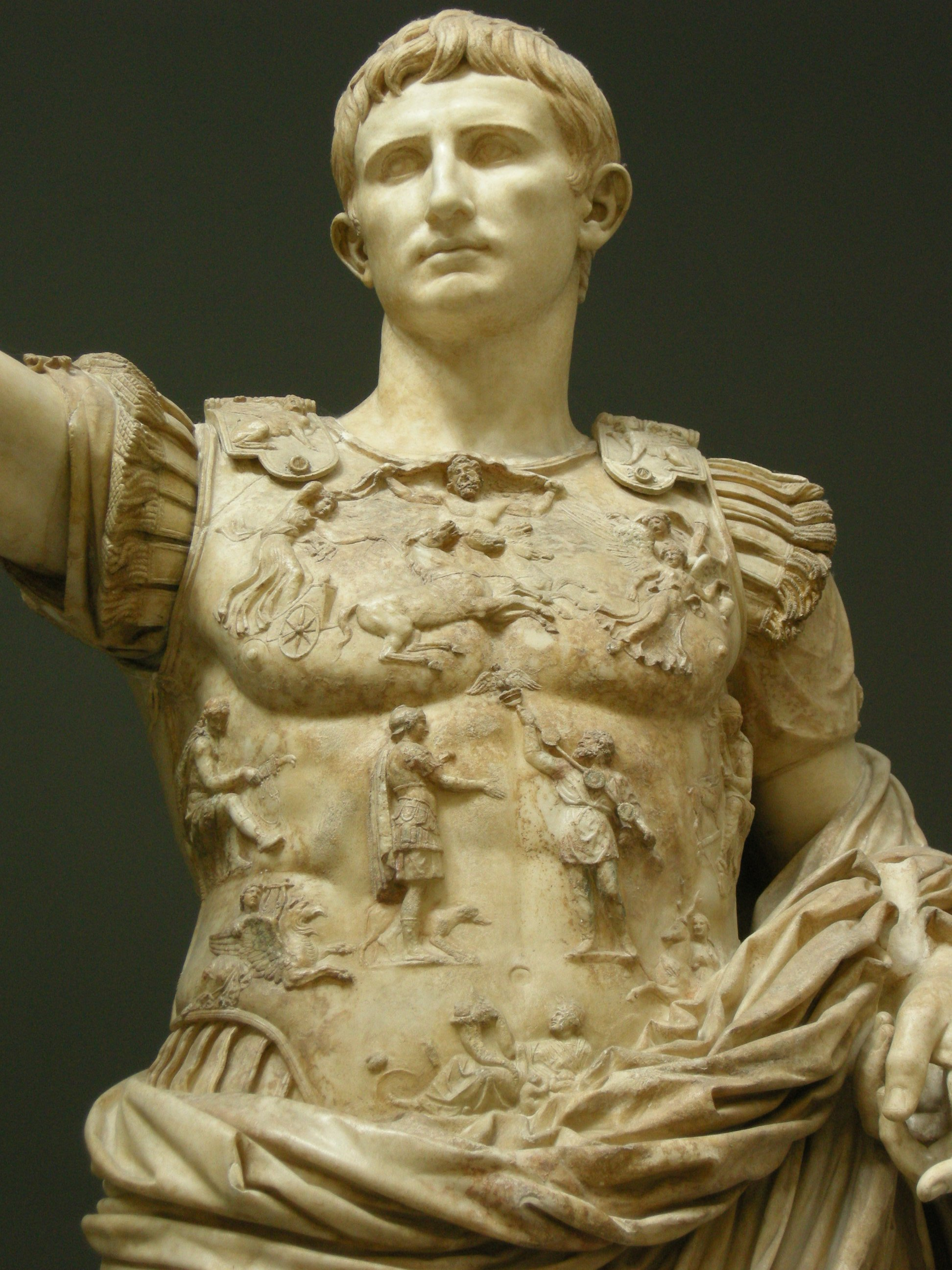
The central breastplate relief on the statue of Augustus of Prima Porta shows the return of the Aquila (Roman eagle standard) lost to the Parthians.

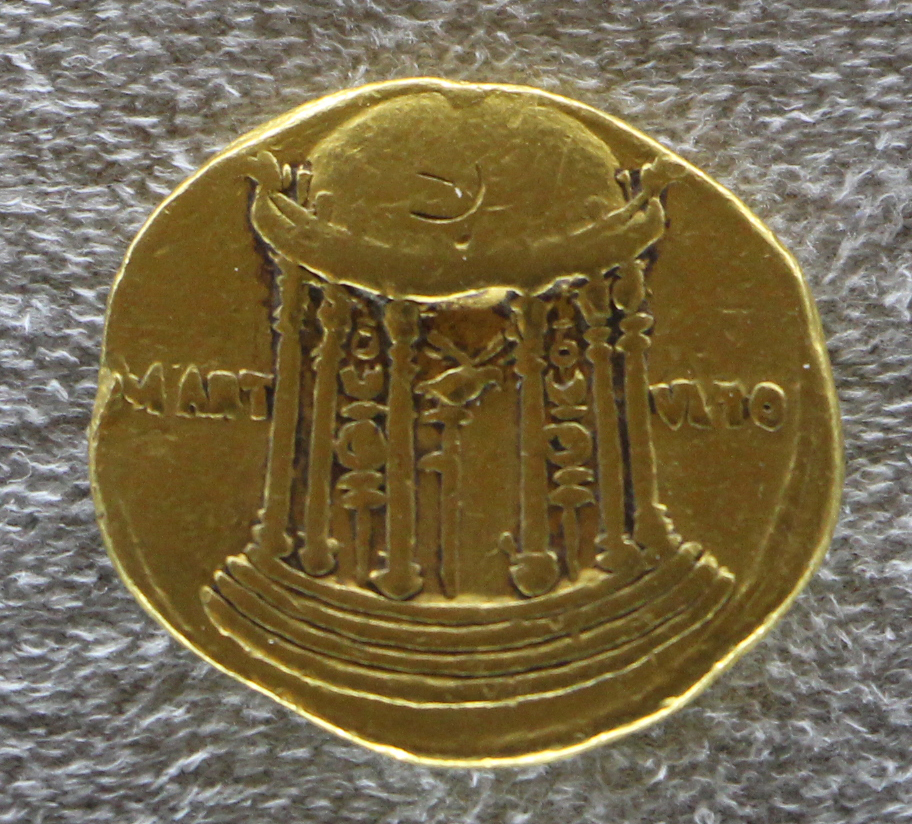
Roman Coin showing the Aquila (Roman eagle standard) in the Temple of Mars the Avenger.

The Forum of Augustus was built to both house a temple honouring Mars Ultor, and to provide another space for legal proceedings, as the Roman Forum was very crowded. Before battle, generals set off from the Temple of Mars, after attending an inaugural ceremony. Other ceremonies took place in the temple including the assumption of the toga virilis by young men. The Senate met at the Temple when discussing war and the victorious generals dedicated their spoils from their triumphs to Mars at the altar. Arms or treasure recovered from battle were often stored in the Forum as well. Another use that Augustus made of the Temple was to store the standards taken by the Parthians from Crassus during his failed campaign, after their retrieval through Augustus' diplomacy in 20 BC, as depicted by the Augustus of Prima Porta. Three Aquilae were lost in 9 AD in the Battle of the Teutoburg Forest of the Legions Legio XVII, Legio XVIII and Legio XIX; all three were recovered-one in 14 AD from the Marsi and one in 15 AD from the Bructeri; the 3rd was recovered in 41 AD from the Chauci-and all three placed within the Temple of Mars the Avenger.

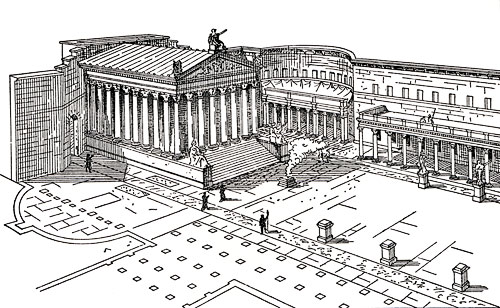
Artist's rendition of Forum of Augustus.

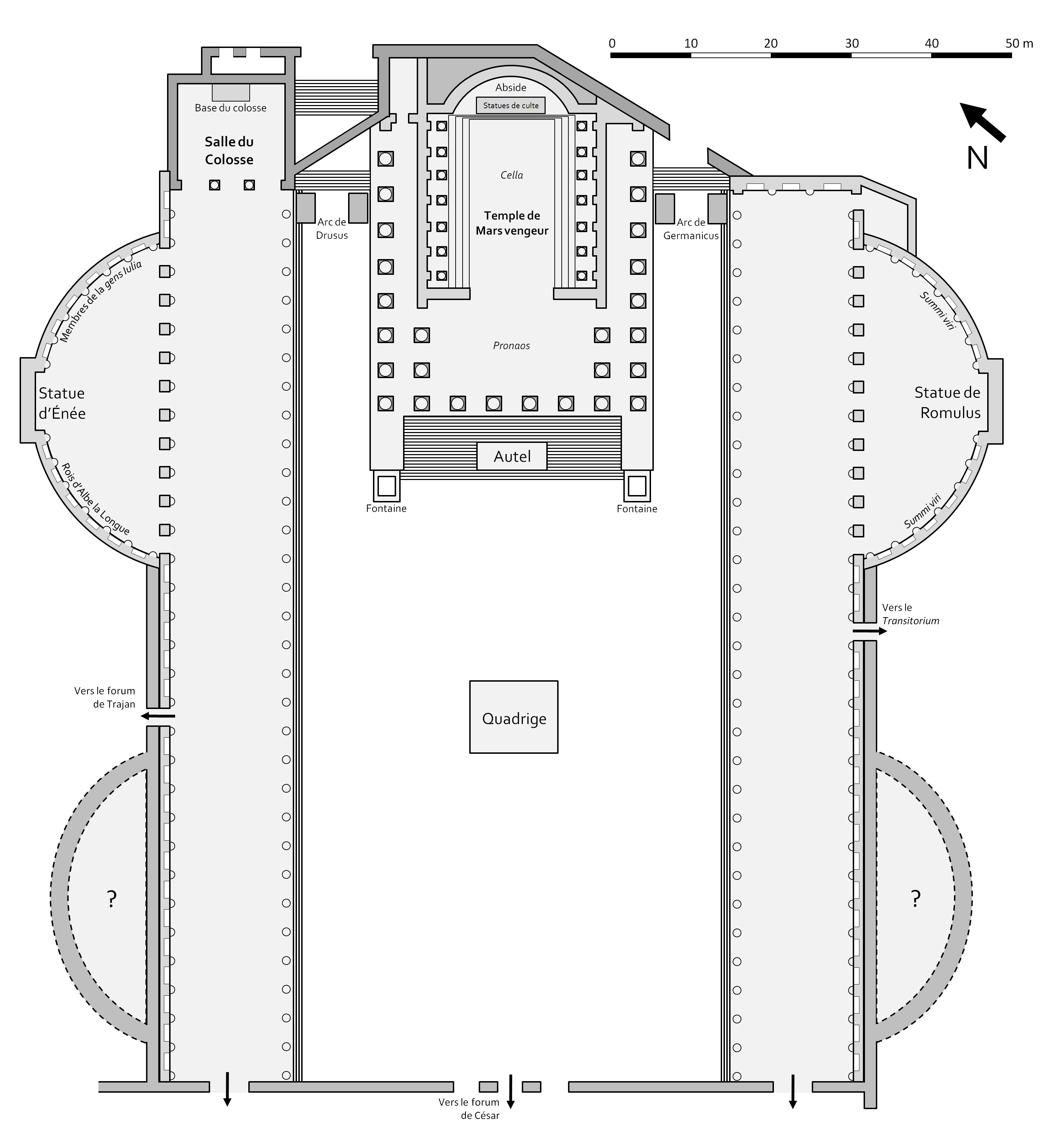
Plan of Forum of Augustus with Temple of Mars the Avenger.

== Statuary ==
The Forum was filled with a rich variety of different statues. Most notable were the statues of Augustus in full military outfit in the center of the Forum, and of Mars and Venus in the Temple. In total, there were 108 portrait statues with inscriptions of each individual's achievements, providing an important idea of how Augustus viewed his role within Roman history. The inscriptions are called elogia by modern scholars. In addition to statues of all the Roman triumphatores, which were either made of bronze or marble and were placed along the left side of the Forum and in the left exedrae, the entire right side and right exedrae were full of statues of men in the Julian-Claudian family. They trace Augustus's lineage back through the fourteen Alban kings to the founding ancestors Aeneas and Romulus. These figures reinforced the importance of both Roman lineage and also of the prestigious lineage that Augustus himself held. By advertising this lineage, he reinforced his power and authorities as a leader. Also, by placing himself amongst great figures and heroes, he further portrayed himself and his own importance. He paints himself as one of ‘the greats’ worthy of the power he held. Whilst all the elogia record the deeds of these great men, Augustus's Res Gestae Divi Augusti acts as a direct parallel.

The statues in the forum provided excellent reasoning for Augustus to claim his restoration of the Republic. Not only were the great men of Rome's past being honored through their busts, but Augustus was also establishing his ancestry to these men, either by blood or by spirit. This provided Augustus with another connection between himself and the old Republic, an era of Roman history he continuously tried to invoke during his reign.

The statues of the famous men of the Republic for which an inscription has survived are:

- Aulus Postumius Albus Regillensis, consul in 496 BC, won the Battle of Lake Regillus.
- Manius Valerius Maximus, dictator in 494 BC, allegedly the first princeps Senatus.
- Aulus Cornelius Cossus, consul in 428 BC, was awarded the spolia opima for killing the Etruscan king Lars Tolumnius during the Battle of Fidenae in 437 BC.
- Marcus Furius Camillus, five times dictator between 396 and 367 BC, who saved Rome after the Sack by the Gauls in 390 BC.
- Marcus Valerius Corvus, six times consul between 346 and 299 BC, triumphed three times.
- Lucius Papirius Cursor, five times consul between 326 and 313 BC, hero of the Second Samnite War. He was compared to Alexander the Great by Livy.
- Appius Claudius Caecus, censor in 312 BC, built the first Roman aqueduct (Aqua Appia) and first Roman road (Via Appia).
- Gaius Fabricius Luscinus, consul in 282 and 278 BC, famous for his incorruptibility during the Pyrrhic War.
- Gaius Duilius, consul in 260 BC, won the first naval victory over Carthage at Mylae.
- Quintus Fabius Maximus Verrucosus, five times consul between 233 and 209 BC, famous for his delaying strategy against Hannibal during the Second Punic War.
- Marcus Claudius Marcellus, five times consul between 222 and 208, was awarded the spolia opima in 222 BC, and captured Syracuse in 212 BC.
- Scipio Africanus, consul in 205 and 194 BC, defeated Hannibal at Zama in 202 BC.
- Gaius Cornelius Cethegus, consul in 197, triumphed over the Cenomani.
- Marcus Porcius Cato, consul in 195 BC, famous for his conservative morals, author of the first Roman History in Latin.
- Lucius Cornelius Scipio Asiaticus, consul in 190 BC, defeated Antiochos III at Magnesia.
- Marcus Aemilius Lepidus, consul in 187 and 175, princeps senatus six times, and pontifex maximus.
- Lucius Aemilius Paullus Macedonicus, consul in 182 and 168 BC, defeated Perseus at Pydna.
- Tiberius Sempronius Gracchus, consul in 177 and 163 BC, triumphed over the Celtiberians and Sardinians.
- Gaius Claudius Pulcher, consul in 177, triumphed over the Histri and Ligures.
- Scipio Aemilianus, consul in 147 and 134 BC, captured Carthage and Numantia.
- Quintus Caecilius Metellus Macedonicus, consul in 143, defeated Andriscus.
- Quintus Caecilius Metellus Numidicus, consul in 109, defeated Jugurtha.
- Gaius Marius, seven times consul between 107 and 86, defeated the Cimbri and Teutons.
- Sulla, consul in 88 and 80 BC, captured Jugurtha and defeated Mithridates.
- Lucius Licinius Lucullus, consul in 74 BC, defeated Mithridates and Tigranes.

Other statues included an ivory Athena Alea, sculpted by Endoeus, which Augustus took from its temple in Tegea, in Greece. A large statue called the Genius of Augustus was placed in the northern portico, currently referred to as the Hall of the Colossus- the possible base is still intact and visible. Fragments of this statue are now located in the nearby Museum of the Imperial Fora.

The forum is made of ashlar blocks of peperino tufa with Carrara marble. Its construction also includes colonnades made of giallo antico, from Numidia, with the second storey of colonnades made from africano and pavonazzetto. These materials are from all over the Empire, but the enclosing walls were made of local Roman stone; although the different coloured stone would create a visual spectacle they also symbolize that the empire might be built from many different nations, but they are all defended and kept by Rome.

== See also ==
- Forum of Caesar – Ancient Roman imperial forum in Rome
- Imperial fora
- Roman architecture
- List of ancient monuments in Rome

== Bibliography ==
- Galinsky, Karl. Augustan Culture. pp. 197–213.
- Joseph Geiger, The First Hall of Fame, A Study of the Statues in the Forum Augustum, Leiden/Boston, Brill, 2008.
- Roth, Leland M. (1993). Understanding Architecture: Its Elements, History and Meaning (First ed.). Boulder, CO: Westview Press. p. 222. ISBN 0-06-430158-3.
- Luce, T.J. Livy Augustus and the Forum Augustum. pp. 123–138.
- Platner, Samuel Ball. A Topographical Dictionary of Ancient Rome.
- Raaflaub. Between the Republic and Empire.
- Spannagel, Martin (1999). Exemplaria Principis. Untersuchungen zu Entstehung und Ausstattung des Augustusforums [Exemplaria Principis. Studies on the origins and the design of the Forum of Augustus]. Heidelberg: Verlag Archäologie und Geschichte. ISBN 3-9804648-4-9.
- The Cambridge Ancient History (New ed.). London: Cambridge University Press. 1970. p. 193.

| Preceded by Imperial fora | Landmarks of Rome; Forum of Augustus | Succeeded by Forum of Caesar |
