= Cloelia gens =

Ancient Roman family

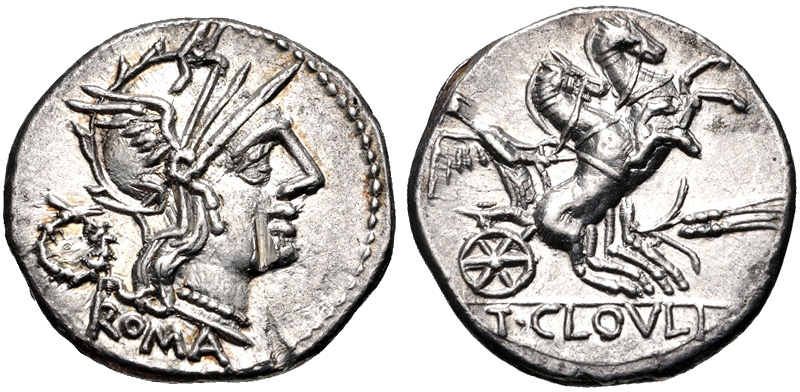
Denarius of Titus Cloelius, 128 BC. On the obverse is the head of Roma, on the reverse is Victoria driving a biga, with a corn-ear below.

The gens Cloelia, originally Cluilia, and occasionally written Clouilia or Cloulia, was a patrician family at ancient Rome. The gens was prominent throughout the period of the Republic. The first of the Cloelii to hold the consulship was Quintus Cloelius Siculus, in 498 BC.

== Origin ==
The Cluilii were one of the noble families of Alba Longa, where they succeeded the royal house of the Silvii. According to legend, Numitor, the grandfather of Romulus and Remus, was deposed by his brother, Amulius, and his sons were slain. When the princes had grown to manhood, they killed Amulius and restored their grandfather to the throne. As he had no surviving sons, it may be that upon Numitor's death the throne passed to the Cluilii. The last king of Alba Longa, and the only one following Numitor whose name has survived in tradition, was Gaius Cluilius.

During his reign, Tullus Hostilius, the third King of Rome (traditionally reigned from 673 to 641 BC), declared his intention to destroy Alba Longa and remove its inhabitants to Rome. Cluilius marched an army to Rome, where according to legend he constructed the Fossa Cluilia, an earthen trench, to fortify his position. During his siege, Cluilius died, and in his place, Mettius Fufetius was appointed dictator. Despite enlisting the help of the Fidenates, Fufetius and the Alban forces were defeated, and their ancient city was destroyed. Its inhabitants were transferred to Rome, where several of the noble families of Alba Longa, including the Cluilii, were enrolled in the senate, and subsequently numbered amongst the patricians.

In later times, when it became fashionable for Roman families to claim mythological origins, it was said that the gens was descended from Clolius, a companion of Aeneas. From an early date, the Cloelii bore the cognomen Siculus, perhaps referring to the legend that the people of Alba Longa was a mixture of two ancient Italic peoples, the Siculi and the Prisci. Whatever the origin of the family, it may be noted that during the first century of the Republic, two leaders of the Aequi, an Oscan people of central Italy, bore the nomen Cloelius.

== Praenomina ==
The principal names of the Cloelii were Titus, Quintus, and Publius, all of which were very common throughout Roman history. Gaius was borne by the earliest Cloelius whose name is known, and at least one respected member of the gens bore the ancient praenomen Tullus.

== Branches and cognomina ==
The only major family of the Cloelii bore the cognomen Siculus, apparently referring to one of the Siculi, an ancient Italic people who had been expelled from the mainland, and subsequently lived in Sicily. Some trade links with Sicily could explain the adoption by the family of this very rare cognomen. The Cloelii Siculi appear at the very beginning of the Roman Republic, and filled the highest offices of the state until the 2nd century BC. The first of the family to achieve prominence is sometimes called Vocula, probably referring to a low or quiet voice. Another patrician cognomen was Tullus. The only other known cognomen was Gracchus, held by one of the Aequian Cloelii. The Cloelii recorded at the end of the Republic were plebeian.

== Members ==
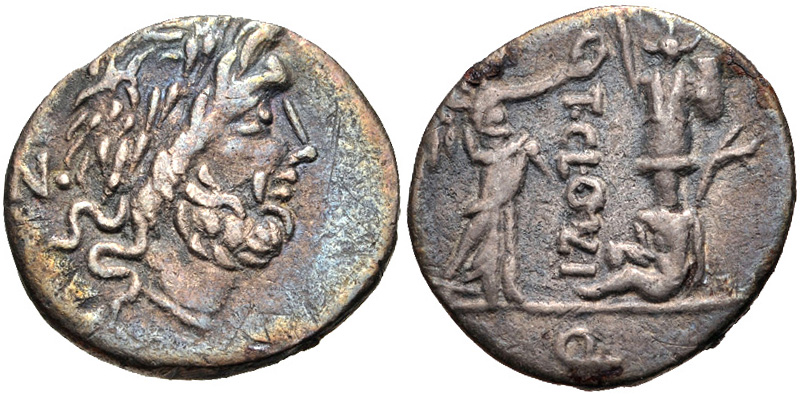
Quinarius of Titus Cloelius. 98 BC. Jupiter is portrayed on the obverse. The reverse depicts Victoria crowning a trophy with a captive at its feet, and a carnyx behind. It commemorates the victories of Marius against the Teutons. This coin may have been minted for Marius' veterans.

=== Early Cluilii ===
- Gaius Cluilius, the last King of Alba Longa, who perished during the reign of Tullus Hostilius.
- Cloelia, one of a group of virgins given as hostages to Lars Porsena, the King of Clusium, during his siege of Rome circa 508 BC. According to legend, she escaped the Etruscan camp, and swam across the Tiber to freedom.

=== Cloelii Siculi ===
- Quintus Cloelius Siculus, also called Vocula, was consul in 498 BC, the year that war with the Latins broke out. According to Dionysius, he nominated his colleague, Titus Larcius, as dictator, but Livius and other authorities place Lartius' dictatorship three years earlier, in his first consulship.
- Titus Cloelius Siculus, tribunus militum consulari potestate in 444 BC; he was elected one of the first consular tribunes, but he and his colleagues were compelled to resign due to a fault in the auspices.
- Publius Cloelius Siculus, tribunus militum consulari potestate in 378 BC.
- Quintus Cloelius Siculus, censor in 378 BC; war prevented the censors of this year from completing their duties.
- Publius Cloelius Siculus, consecrated rex sacrorum in 180 BC; according to Valerius Maximus, he had also been Flamen Dialis, but was compelled to resign due to a fault in the auspices.

=== Others ===
- Cloelius Gracchus, the leader of the Aequi in 458 BC, with his forces surrounded the consul Lucius Minucius Augurinus, but was then surrounded by the dictator Cincinnatus, and was surrendered by his troops.
- Cloelius, an Aequian commander, led a force of Volsci that besieged Ardea in 443 BC. He was defeated, and surrendered by his troops to the Roman consul, Geganius Macerinus.
- Cloelius Tullus, one of four ambassadors sent to the Fidenates in 438 BC; they were executed on the orders of Lars Tolumnius, the king of Veii.
- Titus Cloelius, triumvir monetalis in 128 BC. He spelt his name Cloulius. He was from Tarracina and possibly a popularis.
- Titus Cloelius T. f., quaestor in 98 BC, then a Marian legate in 83. At some point, perhaps in the early 90s, Cloelius and his brother were tried and acquitted in the murder of their father, the moneyer of 128.
- Cloelia, the third wife of Sulla.
- Sextus Cloelius, a scriba, and one of the henchman of Publius Clodius Pulcher, whom he assisted in the writing of contracts and laws, thereby incurring the enmity of Cicero. He was condemned for inciting mob violence after his employer's death in 52 BC, and was still living in 44. In a number of manuscripts, he is erroneously called Clodius.
- Quintus Cloelius M. f., a senator in 39 BC, who may have held the office of aedile or tribune of the plebs. He was enrolled in the tribus Quirina.
- Sextus Cloelius Sex. f., known from an inscription, perhaps related to Clodius' henchman. The inscription mentions that he was black.

== See also ==
- List of Roman gentes

== Sources ==
=== Ancient sources ===
- Marcus Tullius Cicero, Pro Sexto Roscio.
- Dionysius of Halicarnassus, Romaike Archaiologia (Roman Antiquities).
- Titus Livius (Livy), History of Rome.
- Valerius Maximus, Factorum ac Dictorum Memorabilium (Memorable Facts and Sayings).

=== Modern sources ===
- Theodor Mommsen et alii, Corpus Inscriptionum Latinarum (The Body of Latin Inscriptions, abbreviated CIL), Berlin-Brandenburgische Akademie der Wissenschaften (1853–present).
- T. Robert S. Broughton, The Magistrates of the Roman Republic, American Philological Association (1952–1986).
- Robert Maxwell Ogilvie, Commentary on Livy, books 1–5, Oxford, Clarendon Press, 1965.
- Robert J. Rowland, Jr., "The Importance of Being Cloelius", in The Classical World, Vol. 61, No. 2 (Oct., 1967).
- T. P. Wiseman, "T. Cloelius of Tarracina," Classical Review 17, pp. 263–264, (1967).
- Michael Crawford, Roman Republican Coinage, Cambridge University Press (1974, 2001).
- D. R. Shackleton Bailey, "Ecce iterum Cloelius", Historia: Zeitschrift für Alte Geschichte, Bd. 30, H. 3 (3rd Qtr., 1981), p. 383.
- Michael C. Alexander, Trials in the Late Roman Republic, 149 BC to 50 BC, University of Toronto Press (1990).
- Cynthia Damon, "Sex. Cloelius, Scriba," Harvard Studies in Classical Philology 94 (1992), pp. 227–244.
