= Tolumnia gens =

Etruscan noble family, later Roman plebeians

The gens Tolumnia was an Etruscan aristocratic family of great antiquity, and a minor plebeian gens in Roman times. Members of this gens are attested in epigraphy as early as the seventh century BC, but the family is best known from Lars Tolumnius, King of Veii during the fifth century BC. In imperial times some of the Tolumnii are mentioned in inscriptions from Gaul.

== Origin ==
The earliest inscriptions of this family are all from the city of Veii in Etruria, where they formed part of the local aristocracy. The Etruscan spelling of the nomen is Tulumnes, which in early Latin was rendered as Tolonios. Tolumnius is the spelling used by Roman writers, and is found in most later inscriptions. The Etruscan alphabet had dropped the letter 'o', and Etruscan orthography does not seem to have distinguished between the sounds of 'o' and 'u', although Latin writers differentiated between them when recording Etruscan names.

== Praenomina ==
The early Tolumnii bore Etruscan names such as Lars, Velthur, and Karcuna; but from the middle Republic all of those known from epigraphy have common Latin praenomina, including Lucius, Aulus, and Decimus.

== Members ==
This list includes abbreviated praenomina. For an explanation of this practice, see filiation.

- Velthur Tulumnes, dedicated a bucchero vessel at the sanctuary of Veii, dating from the end of the seventh century BC.
- Karcuna Tulumnes, dedicated a bucchero vessel at the sanctuary of Veii, dating from the first half of the sixth century BC.
- Lars Tolumnius, King of Veii in 438 BC, when the inhabitants of Fidenae revolted against Roman rule, and allied themselves with Veii. The murder of four Roman ambassadors by the Fidenates—according to one legend, due to a careless remark by Tolumnius that the Fidenates misinterpreted—led to a war between Rome and Veii, in which Aulus Cornelius Cossus won the spolia opima by slaying Tolumnius in single combat.
- Lucius Tolonios, made offerings to Ceres and Minerva at Veii, dating from the early third century BC.
- Tolonius, a potter whose maker's mark was found on earthenware at Vesunna, formerly part of Gallia Aquitania.
- Aulus Tolumnius, buried along with Decimus and Lucius Tolumnius in a family sepulchre built by another Lucius Tolumnius at Narbo in Gallia Narbonensis.
- Decimus Tolumnius, buried along with Aulus and Lucius Tolumnius in a family sepulchre built by another Lucius Tolumnius at Narbo.
- Lucius Tolumnius, buried along with Aulus and Decimus Tolumnius in a family sepulchre built by another Lucius Tolumnius at Narbo.
- Lucius Tolumnius, built a family sepulchre at Narbo for Aulus, Decimus, and another Lucius Tolumnius.
- Tolumnia L. f. Successa, buried at Narbo.

== See also ==
- List of Roman gentes

== Bibliography ==
- Marcus Tullius Cicero, Philippicae.
- Titus Livius (Livy), History of Rome.
- Dictionary of Greek and Roman Biography and Mythology, William Smith, ed., Little, Brown and Company, Boston (1849).
- Theodor Mommsen et alii, Corpus Inscriptionum Latinarum (The Body of Latin Inscriptions, abbreviated CIL), Berlin-Brandenburgische Akademie der Wissenschaften (1853–present).
- Carl Pauli et alii, Corpus Inscriptionum Etruscarum (The Body of Etruscan Inscriptions), Barth, Leipzig (1885–present).
- René Cagnat et alii, L'Année épigraphique (The Year in Epigraphy, abbreviated AE), Presses Universitaires de France (1888–present).
- La Carte Archéologique de la Gaule (Archaeological Map of Gaul, abbreviated CAG), Académie des Inscriptions et Belles-Lettres (1931–present).
- T. Robert S. Broughton, The Magistrates of the Roman Republic, American Philological Association (1952–1986).
- Attilio Degrassi, Inscriptiones Latinae Liberae Rei Publicae (Latin Inscriptions from the Roman Republic, abbreviated ILLRP), Florence (1965).
