= Gaius Fulcinius =

Roman diplomat (died 437 BC)

Gaius Fulcinius (died 437 BC) was a Roman emissary dispatched to the colony of Fidenae. His murder led to the resumption of war against Veii, and the eventual capture of Fidenae.

== Biography ==
By the second half of the 5th century BC, the former Roman colony of Fidenae had revolted against Rome, and placed themselves under the protection of the wealthy Etruscan city-state of Veii. In 437, the Senate responded by sending four ambassadors, including Gaius Fulcinius, to the leaders of Fidenae. When Fulcinius and the rest arrived, they demanded that Fidenae abandon its pact with Veii, and return the colony to operating under Rome's sphere of influence.

According to Livy, the leaders of Fidenae sent an urgent message to Lars Tolumnius, the king of Veii, asking what they should do. Lars Tolumnius, with an eye to binding Fidenae closer to Veii, ordered them to execute Gaius Fulcinius and his fellow ambassadors, which they proceeded to do. This act saw Rome declare war on Veii, and they sent an army to besiege Fidenae. To honour their sacrifice for the Republic, the Romans later erected half-sized statues of Gaius Fulcinius and his colleagues Tullus Cloelius, Spurius Antius, and Lucius Roscius on the Rostra, in the Roman Forum.

Cicero mentioned Gaius Fulcinius in his ninth Philippic, declaring that the reason Fulcinius was honoured was not that he died in bloodshed, but that he died for the Republic. According to Cicero, his statue was no longer on the Rostra by the time he wrote his speech attacking Marc Antony (43 BC).

== See also ==
- Roman-Etruscan Wars

== Sources ==
=== Ancient ===
- Livy, "Ab Urbe Condita"

=== Modern ===
- Broughton, T. Robert S., The Magistrates of the Roman Republic, Vol I (1951)
