= El Cortès =

el Cortès
- Singular population entity
- Location within Spain Location within Catalonia Location within Province of Barcelona
- Coordinates: 41°48′00.0″N 1°46′12.0″E
- Country: Spain
- A. community: Catalunya
- Province: Barcelona
- Municipality: Callús

Population (January 1, 2024)
  - Total: 69
- Time zone: UTC+01:00
- Postal code: 08262
- MCN: 08038000400

el Cortès is a singular population entity in the municipality of Callús, in Catalonia, Spain.

As of 2024 it has a population of 69 people.
