= Temple of Mars Ultor =

Sanctuary in Ancient Rome

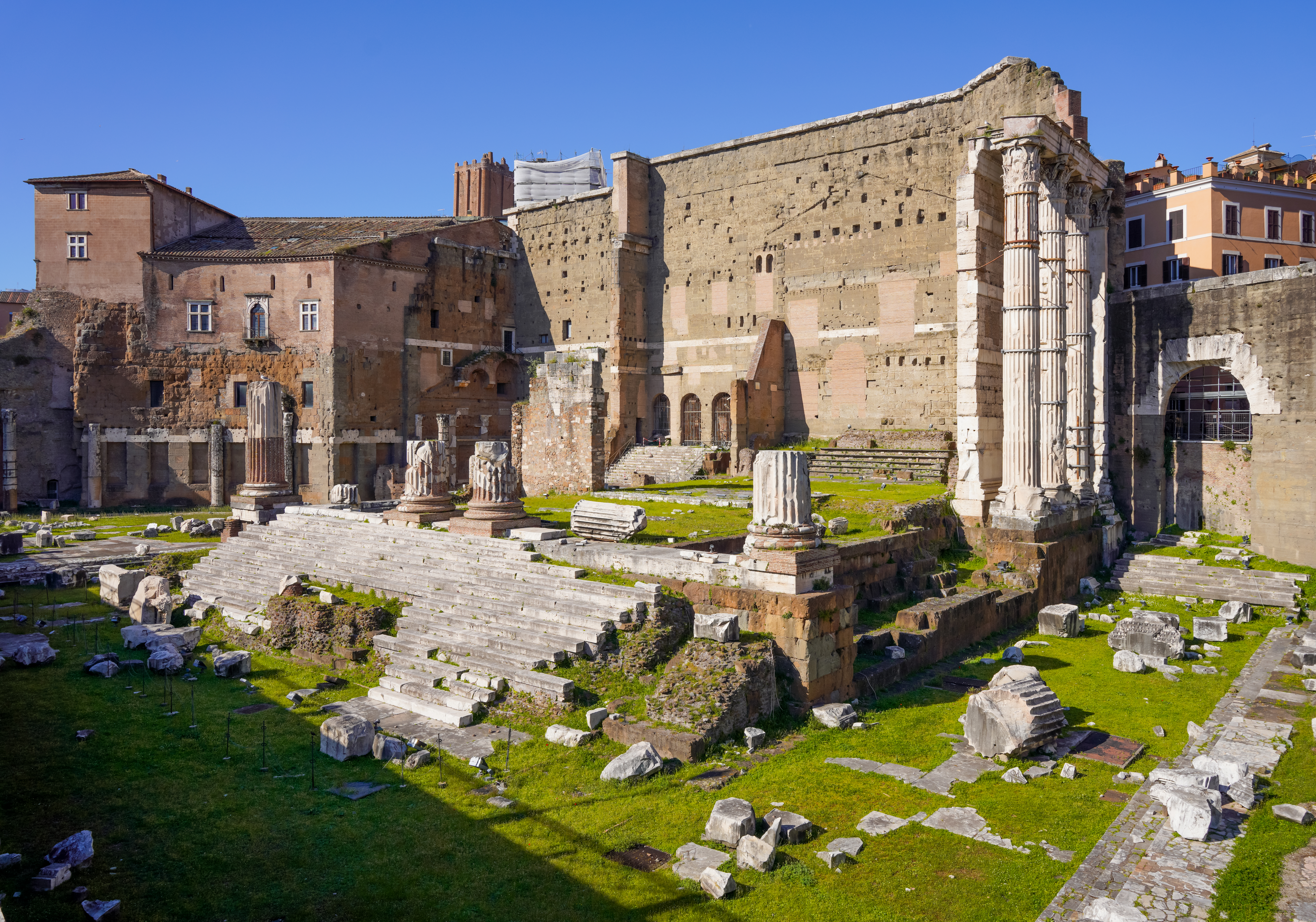
- Ruins of the Temple of Mars Ultor in the Forum of Augustus
- Interactive map of Temple of Mars Ultor
- 41°53′38″N 12°29′13″E
- Type: Temple
- Location: Forum of Augustus, Rome
- Region: Latium
- Part of: Forum of Augustus

History
- Founded: Vowed in 42 BC, dedicated in 2 BC
- Built by: Augustus
- Abandoned: 4th century AD (closed during the persecution of pagans in the late Roman Empire)

Site notes
- Material: Luna marble, Travertine, Tufa
- Condition: Ruined

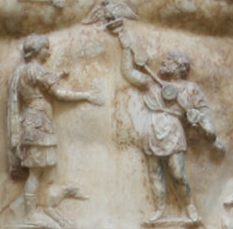
Return of the Aquila by the Parthians

The Temple of Mars Ultor was a sanctuary erected in Ancient Rome by the Roman Emperor Augustus in 2 BCE and dedicated to the god Mars in his guise as avenger. The centerpiece of the Forum of Augustus, it was a peripteral style temple, on the front and sides, but not the rear (sine postico), raised on a platform and lined with eight columns in the Corinthian order style.

According to Suetonius and Ovid, the young Octavian vowed to build a temple to Mars in 42 BCE just before the Battle of Philippi if the god would grant him and Marcus Antonius victory over two of the assassins of Julius Caesar, Gaius Cassius Longinus and Marcus Junius Brutus. However, work did not commence on the temple until after the recovery of the Aquilae in 20 BCE that had been lost by Marcus Licinius Crassus in the disastrous Battle of Carrhae 33 years earlier. Originally, the Roman Senate had decreed that the returned standards were to be housed in a temple to Mars Ultor that was to be built on the Capitoline Hill. Augustus however, declared that he would build it at his own expense on the site of his new forum. Augustus’s decision to wait to fulfill his vow has been speculated to have been due to a reluctance to celebrate his victory over those who were seen as the defenders of Libertas, whereas the return of the standards, and its symbolic revenge against the Parthians, was a more acceptable victory to commemorate.

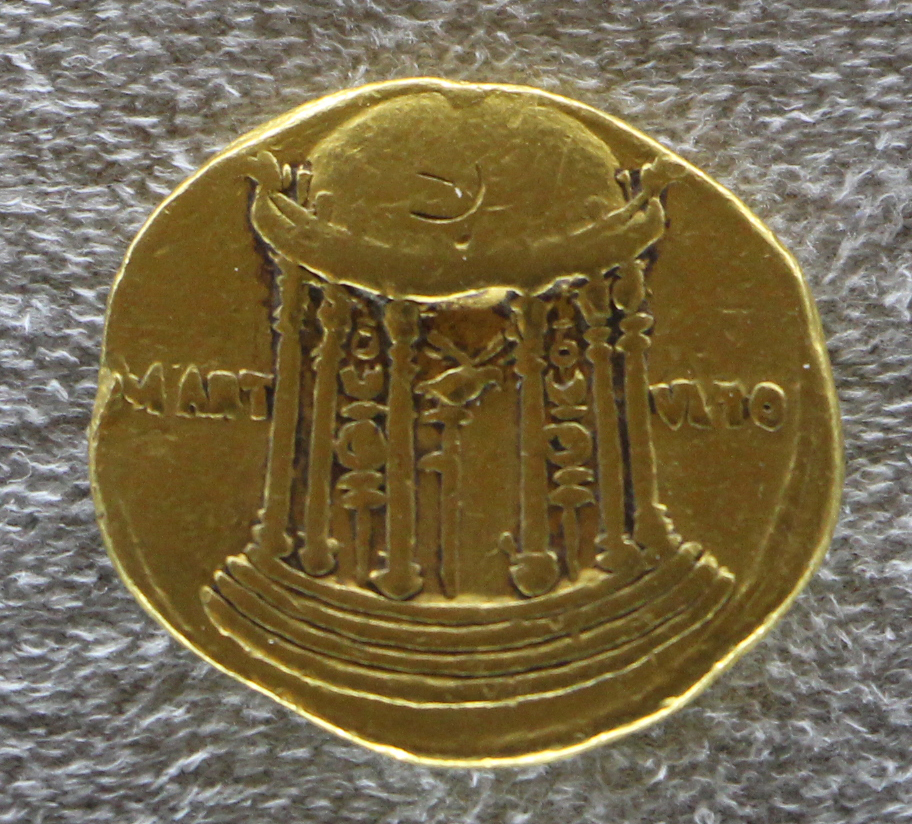
Roman coin showing the Aquilae on display in the Temple of Mars the Avenger in Rome

The temple was dedicated, albeit in an incomplete state, in 2 BCE, to coincide with Augustus's celebration of his 13th consulship as well as his acceptance of the title Pater Patriae. The temple (and the forum within which it was placed) was part of imperial propaganda campaign to glorify and bring about an acceptance of the authority of the new Augustan empire. To the imperial regime, it was vital to accentuate the favour of the gods, as well as glorifying the ancestral figures and past of Rome, and so overcome the disorder of the civil wars that had plagued the state for over 50 years. In the words of Augustus himself, "I have fashioned this to lead the citizens to require me, while I live, and the rulers of later times as well, to attain the standard set by those great men of old."

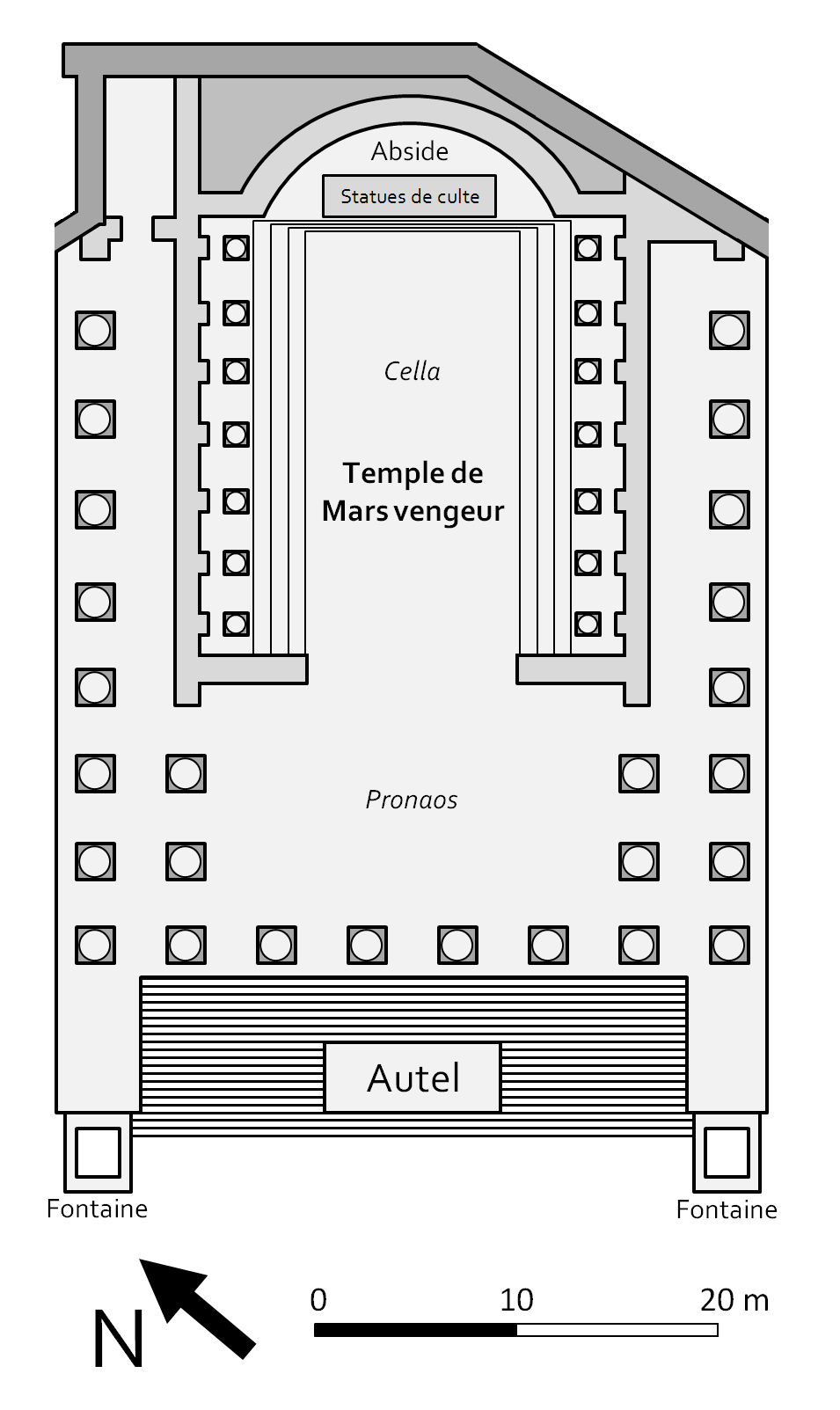
Plan of Temple of Mars the Avenger

On the pediment of the temple was inscribed the name of Augustus, along with a series of reliefs honouring the divinities that played a part in influencing the outcome of battles and wars through their intercession. In the centre was the figure of Mars, flanked by the goddesses Fortuna and Venus. Next to these were the seated figures of Romulus (in the guise of an augur) and the goddess Roma in arms. Finally, in the gable corners were reclining figures of the personification of the Palatine Hill and Father Tiber. It was to these divinities that Augustan propaganda ascribed the self-styled "victory" over the Parthians that saw the return of the lost standards during Augustus's visit to Syria in 20 BCE (and to a lesser extent, his victory at the Battle of Philippi as an act of filial vengeance against the assassins of his adoptive father, Julius Caesar). Further, it also emphasized the role that the goddess Fortuna played his triple victory in Illyria (33 BCE), at the Battle of Actium and in Egypt defeating Cleopatra. Finally, the role of Mars Ultor was critical in Augustus's attempts to refashion the events of his coming to power in a way that obscured the illegality of much of his actions during those years.

Within the temple there stood three statues. In the middle, a colossal Mars Ultor depicted in full military dress, holding a large spear in his right hand and a shield in his left. On the right side of the god stood a statue of the goddess Venus, with Cupid – it was Venus whom all of the gens Julia claimed descent from. To the left of the god was a statue of Julius Caesar, or more specifically ‘Divus Julius’, as he had been deified after a comet was seen in the sky during his funeral games.

In 19 CE, the emperor Tiberius added two arches, one on either side of the temple, and it was later restored during the reign of Hadrian. The temple was used by the Senate as a meeting place to discuss matters of foreign policy, discussions around declarations of war, and to make decisions for awarding triumphs. It also served as a reception place to meet foreign embassies. By the end of the 4th century, the temple would have been closed during the persecution of pagans in the late Roman Empire, when the Christian Emperors issued edicts prohibiting non-Christian worship. During the ninth century, an oratory church was built in the ruins of the temple, and was called the church of San Basilio in Scala Mortuorum. This church was mentioned in the 12th century Mirabilia Urbis Romae and by the late 19th century, the temple ruins was home to the convent of the nuns of Santa Annunziata.

== See also ==
- List of Ancient Roman temples
