= Publius Cloelius Siculus =

Rex Sacrorum in 180 BC

Publius Cloelius Siculus was appointed rex sacrorum in 180 BC, succeeding Gnaeus Cornelius Dolabella. Valerius Maximus says that he was flamen dialis, and that he was compelled to resign because of improperly presented exta ("entrails," as used in the auspices). The rex sacrorum traditionally held this title until his death; however, the date of Siculus' death is unknown.

== See also ==
- Cloelia gens
