= Atilius (freedman) =

Ancient Roman fight promoter

Atilius was an entrepreneur and gladiator fight promoter of ancient Rome who lived in the 1st century CE, and was blamed for the Fidenae stadium collapse, one of the worst structural disasters in history, still referenced in building manuals thousands of years later.

He was one of the libertini (the Roman social status of freedmen), and commissioned an amphitheatre at Fidenae to be built during the reign of the emperor Tiberius, in 27 CE, to capitalize on the Roman appetite for live sporting entertainment, especially as Tiberius was suppressing the games within Rome itself, causing citizens to seek entertainment in satellite cities like Fidenae.

During the venue's grand opening – a crowded gladiatorial event – the arena collapsed, killing or injuring between 20,000 (according to the historian Suetonius) and 50,000 (according to the historian Tacitus) spectators. Other, later writers criticized these numbers as "exaggerations", noting that the famed Colosseum itself only seats 50,000. The 4th-century compilation known as the Chronograph of 354 numbers the dead at 4,205, which modern scholars suspect is closer to the truth.

Tacitus gave an especially graphic account of the disaster:

Those killed at the outset of the catastrophe at least escaped torture, as far as their violent deaths permitted. More pitiable were those, mangled but not yet dead, who knew their wives and children lay there too. In daytime they could see them, and at night they heard their screams and moans...Fifty thousand people were mutilated or crushed to death in the disaster.

Later writers laid the blame on Atilius for compromising safety in the interests of saving money, encouraging his builders to skip critical building stages and use substandard materials.

Atilius was banished as a consequence. This incident also inspired the Roman Senate to draft new regulations for the entertainment industry.
