= Gaius Fulcinius Fabius Maximus Optatus =

Roman quaestor, tribunus plebis, praetor

Gaius Fulcinius Fabius Maximus Optatus was a governor of Hispania Baetica of African origin, active in the late second century CE. His branch of the Fulcinia family rise to prominence in Cartenna during the second century. He was the first of his family to enter the Senatorial Order, becoming a vir clarissimus who held the offices of quaestor, tribunus plebis, and praetor. Fulcinius was patron of the Roman colony Gunugus.

== Background ==
The Fulcinii were an Italian family of plebeian origin. Optatus is a hereditary cognomen from his father's side that goes back at least to his grandfather, Gaius Fulcinius Optatus, who was a flamen of Augustus and magistrate of Cartenna who played a role during the city's defense against an incursion by the "barbarian" Baquates. His father, also named Gaius Fulcinius Optatus, was elevated to the equestrian rank equo publico exornatus sometime between 120 and 150 CE.

== Bibliography ==
- Ferguson, John (1969), Africa in Classical Antiquity: Nine Studies, ISBN 9780841999114
- Geffroy, A. (1893), Comptes rendus des séances - Académie des inscriptions & belles-lettres (in French)
- Ifie, Egbe (1998), The Elite of Roman Africa, ISBN 9789782163974
