= Antia gens =

Ancient Roman family

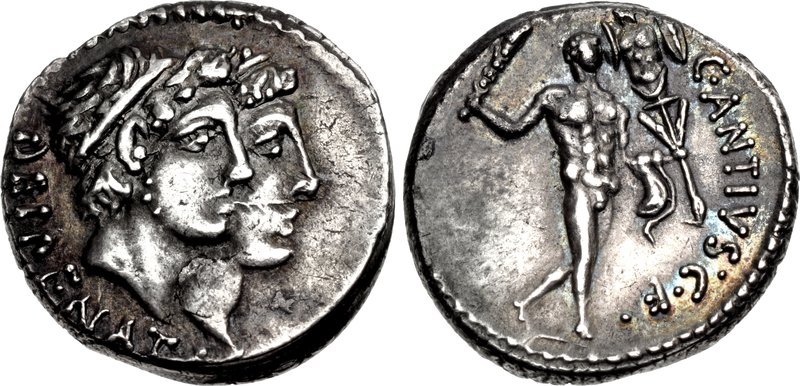
Denarius of Gaius Antius Restio, 47 BC. The heads of the Dei Penates are pictured on the obverse, while Hercules features on the reverse. Both allude to the origins of the gens.

The gens Antia was a minor plebeian family at ancient Rome. The Antii emerged at the end of the second century BC, and were of little importance during the Republic, but they continued into the third century, obtaining the consulship in AD 94 and 105.

== Origin ==
The Antii were possibly from Lanuvium, as one member of the gens minted coins with the heads of the Penates, who were first worshipped in that city. The Antii also claimed descent from Hercules through his son Antiades.

Cicero and Livy tell that a Spurius Antius was one of four Roman ambassadors put to death by Lars Tolumnius, the king of Veii, in 438 BC. However, modern scholars prefer to amend the name to Nautius, borne by several magistrates in the 5th century.

== Praenomina ==
The Antii used the praenomina Spurius, Marcus, and Gaius.

== Branches and cognomina ==
The cognomina of the Antii under the Republic were Briso and Restio. In imperial times we find Quadratus and Crescens.

== Members ==
This list includes abbreviated praenomina. For an explanation of this practice, see filiation.

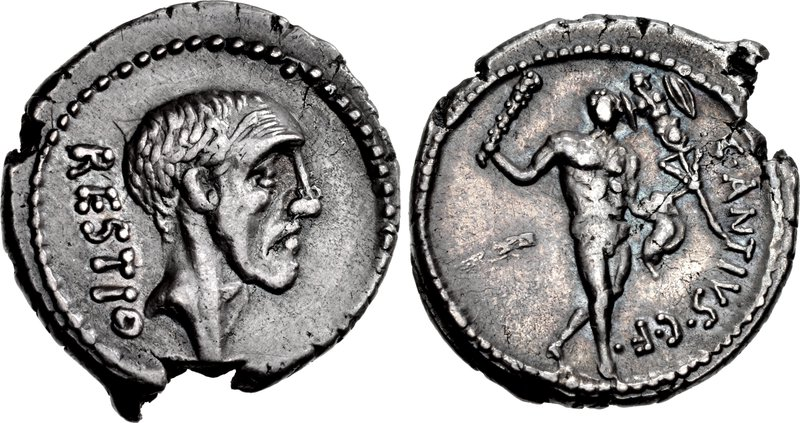
Denarius of Gaius Antius Restio, 47 BC, featuring on the obverse a portrait of his father, tribune of the plebs in 68 BC, and Hercules on the reverse.

=== Antii Restiones ===
- Gaius Antius Restio, tribune of the plebs in 68 BC, and author of a sumptuary law prohibiting magistrates from accepting dinner-invitations.
- Gaius Antius C. f. Restio, triumvir monetalis in 47 BC, proscribed by the triumvirs in 43 BC.
- Gaius Antius Restio, a senator in charge of the census in Gaul in AD 14.

=== Other Antii ===
- Spurius Antius, one of four Roman ambassadors put to death by Lars Tolumnius, the king of Veii, in 438 BC. Together with his colleagues, he was memorialized by a statue on the rostra. More likely named Spurius Nautius.
- Marcus Antius Briso, tribune of the plebs in 137 BC, he opposed the lex Tabellaria of Lucius Cassius Longinus Ravilla.
- Gaius Antius Aulus Julius Quadratus, consul suffectus in AD 94, and consul in 105.
- Marcus Antius Crescens Calpurnianus, governor of Britannia circa AD 202.

== See also ==
- List of Roman gentes
- Eleutherius and Antia

== Bibliography ==
- Marcus Tullius Cicero, Brutus, Philippicae.
- Titus Livius (Livy), History of Rome.
- Tacitus, Annales
- Valerius Maximus, Factorum ac Dictorum Memorabilium (Memorable Facts and Sayings).
- Appianus Alexandrinus (Appian), Bellum Civile (The Civil War).
- Aulus Gellius, Noctes Atticae (Attic Nights).
- Ambrosius Theodosius Macrobius, Saturnalia.
- Dictionary of Greek and Roman Biography and Mythology, William Smith, ed., Little, Brown and Company, Boston (1849).
- T. Robert S. Broughton, The Magistrates of the Roman Republic, American Philological Association, 1951–1952.
- Ronald Syme, "Ten Tribunes", The Journal of Roman Studies, 1963, Vol. 53, Parts 1 and 2 (1963), pp. 55–60.
- Michael Crawford, Roman Republican Coinage, Cambridge University Press (1974–2001).
- Béatrice Le Teuff, "Les recensements augustéens, aux origines de l'Empire", Pallas, No. 96 (2014), pp. 75–90.
