= Spurius Antius =

5th-century BC Roman envoy

Spurius Antius was one of four Roman envoys sent to Fidenae after it revolted against Roman rule and allied itself with the Etruscan city state of Veii. He, and the other Roman emissaries, were murdered on the orders of the King of Veii, Lars Tolumnius.

A statue of him, along with those of his fellow murdered ambassadors, stood for a time on the rostrum in the Roman Forum.

== See also ==
- Antia gens
