= Lucius Roscius =

5th-century BC Roman envoy

Lucius Roscius was one of four Roman envoys sent to Fidenae in 438 BC after it revolted against Roman rule and allied itself with the Etruscan city state of Veii. He, and the three other Roman emissaries, were murdered on the orders of the King of Veii, Lars Tolumnius. The four were honored with statues at the rostra.
