= Lars Tolumnius =

Etruscan king of Veii (died 437 BC)

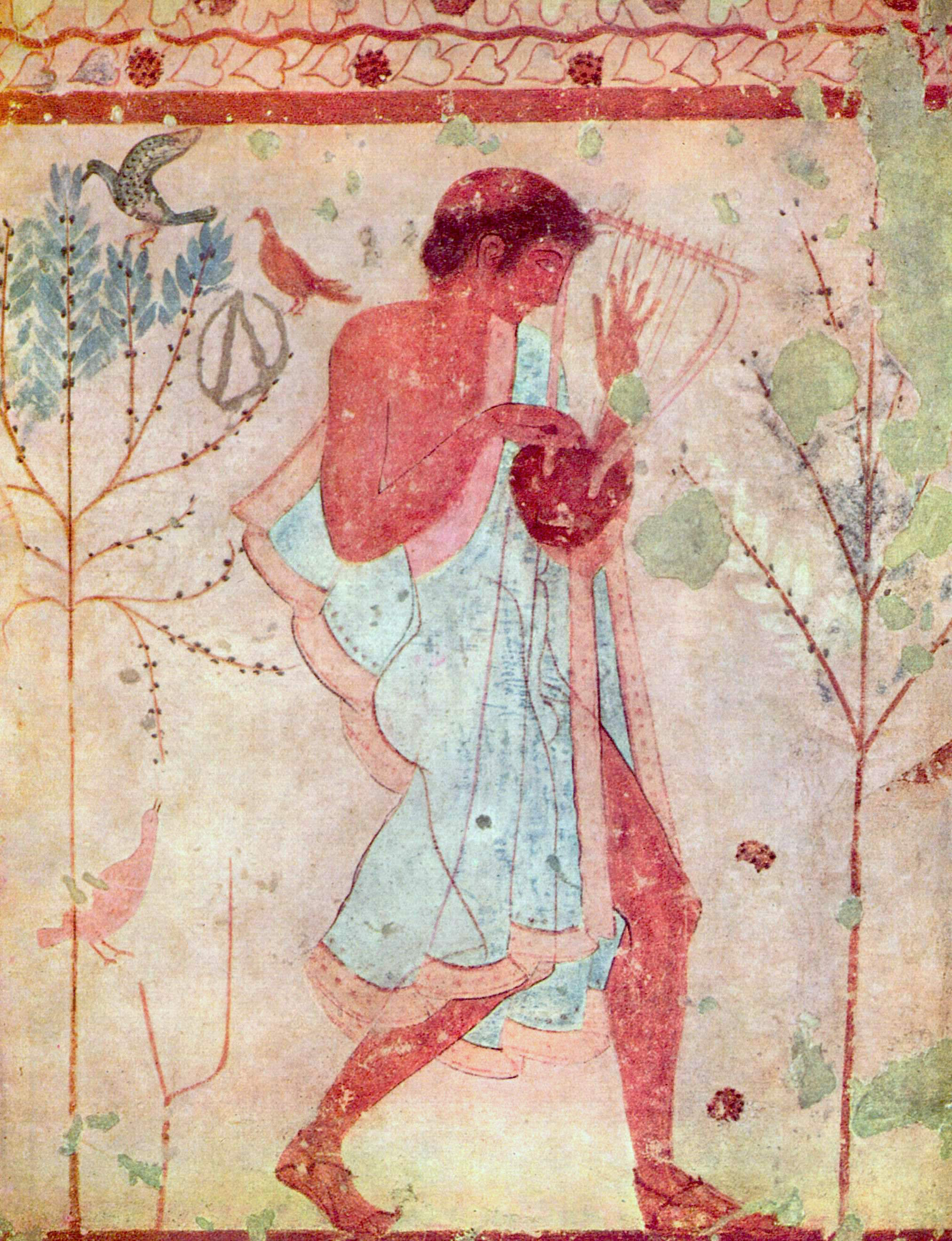
Etruscan musician, Tomb of the Triclinium, Tarquinia

Lars Tolumnius (Etruscan: Larth Tulumnes, d. 437 BC) was the most famous king of the wealthy Etruscan city-state of Veii. He is best remembered for instigating, and decisively losing, a war with the neighboring Roman Republic.

== Background ==
Very little is known of Tolumnius outside of his involvement in Roman legend. His family was evidently part of the Veientine aristocracy, and its nomen is found on a number of inscriptions from votive offerings.

Tolumnius enters history when the Roman colony of Fidenae revolted against the Republic in 438 BC, and allied itself with Veii, giving Tolumnius control of the Fidenate army. The Romans sent four envoys (Tullus Cloelius, Gaius Fulcinius, Spurius Antius, and Lucius Roscius) to Fidenae to demand an explanation, but they were murdered by the Fidenates, apparently on the king's orders.

A popular story held that Tolumnius had not intended this breach of decorum: supposedly he was playing at dice when the Fidenates asked whether they should kill the ambassadors, and having just rolled fortuitously, the king exclaimed, "excellent!", which the Fidenates interpreted as an order to put the Romans to death. Livy is skeptical of this tradition, disbelieving that Tolumnius would have allowed himself to become so easily distracted on an occasion of such importance. Rather, he suggests, Tolumnius intended the execution of the emissaries to involve the Fidenates in a deed that would make it impossible for them to repair the breach with Rome.

== War with Rome ==
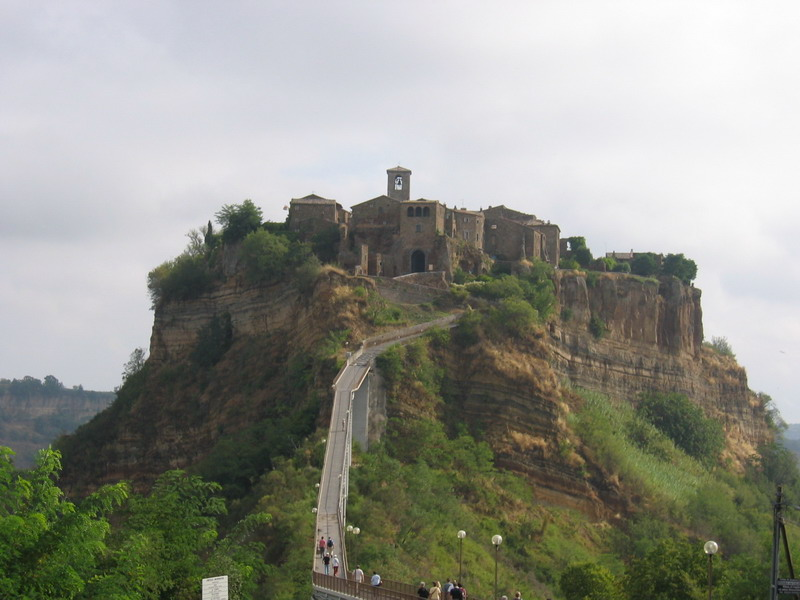
Etruscan walled town (Bagnoregio)

Outraged by Tolumnius' actions, the Roman Senate declared war against Veii, and the following year dispatched a consular army under the command of Lucius Sergius, which met Tolumnius and the Fidenates south of the Anio. Sergius won the day despite brutal fighting, and earned the surname Fidenas, but the Roman losses were so high that a state of emergency was declared, and the Senate appointed Mamercus Aemilius Mamercinus dictator to meet the threat posed by Tolumnius' forces.

Marshaling his troops, the dictator fortified a position at the confluence of the Anio and the Tiber, and waited for Tolumnius to offer battle. Tolumnius, whose army was reinforced by a contingent from Falerii, was content to let the Romans make the first move, but the men of Falerii were eager for battle, so the king agreed to take the field on the following day. He sent a contingent of Veientes through the hills to attack the Romans from the rear, and the Battle of Fidenae commenced.

The fighting was fierce, and made especially noteworthy by the actions of the Roman and Etruscan cavalry. The Roman cavalry broke through the Etruscan lines, and began pursuing the soldiers as they fled, while Tolumnius at the head of the Etruscan horse valiantly opposed them in the defense of his soldiers. The outcome of the battle was in doubt until Aulus Cornelius Cossus, one of the military tribunes serving in the cavalry, charged at the king and unhorsed him. Before Tolumnius could rise, Cossus dismounted and forced the king to the ground with his shield, and stabbed him repeatedly with his spear. With the king's death, the Etruscan cavalry abandoned the field, and the battle was decided.

In recognition of his victory, the dictator Mamercus was granted a triumph, although the most famous hero of the battle was Cossus, who claimed the spolia opima, stripping the arms and armor from the fallen king, and dedicating them at the temple of Jupiter Feretrius. (Note: This was the rarest and highest honour that could be won on the Roman battlefield, and before Cossus only Romulus, the legendary founder and first King of Rome, had claimed the spolia opima, having slain the prince of Caenina. After Cossus, the spolia were claimed in BC 222 by the consul Marcus Claudius Marcellus, who slew the Gallic king Viridomarus in single combat. Finally, in 29 BC, the proconsul Marcus Licinius Crassus claimed the spolia opima after slaying Deldo, King of the Bastarnae in single combat; but the honour of the spolia was denied him by Octavian, who, jealous of the proconsul's fame, claimed that the spolia could only be won by the supreme leader of the Roman forces. In answer to the claim that Cossus had only been a military tribune when he claimed the spolia opima, Octavian reported that he had personally examined the armor of Lars Tolumnius, which Cossus had deposited in the temple of Jupiter Feretrius, and that it was inscribed "Aulus Cornelius Cossus, consul". This led Livy to amend his account of the spolia claimed by Cossus, who did not hold the consulship until BC 428, and has caused some confusion as to the date of the war with Lars Tolumnius; but as Livy states, all of the best sources state that Cossus was a military tribune when he killed the Etruscan king.) Meanwhile, four statues were erected on the rostra in the forum, in memory of the murdered ambassadors.

== See also ==
- Tolumnia gens

== Bibliography ==
- Titus Livius (Livy), Ab Urbe Condita.
- Oxford Classical Dictionary, 2nd ed. (1970).
- C. J. Smith, The Roman Clan: The Gens from Ancient Ideology to Modern Anthropology, Cambridge University Press, ISBN 978-0-521-85692-8, pp. 161 ff, accessed 9 March 2006.
- Bernard Mineo, A Companion to Livy, Wiley, ISBN 978-1-118-33897-1, pp. 322 ff, accessed 15 Sept. 2014.
- Gabriël C. L. M. Bakkum, The Latin Dialect of the Ager Faliscus: 150 Years of Scholarship, Amsterdam University Press (2009), ISBN 978-90-5629-562-2, pp. 38 ff.
