= Callús =

- Municipality
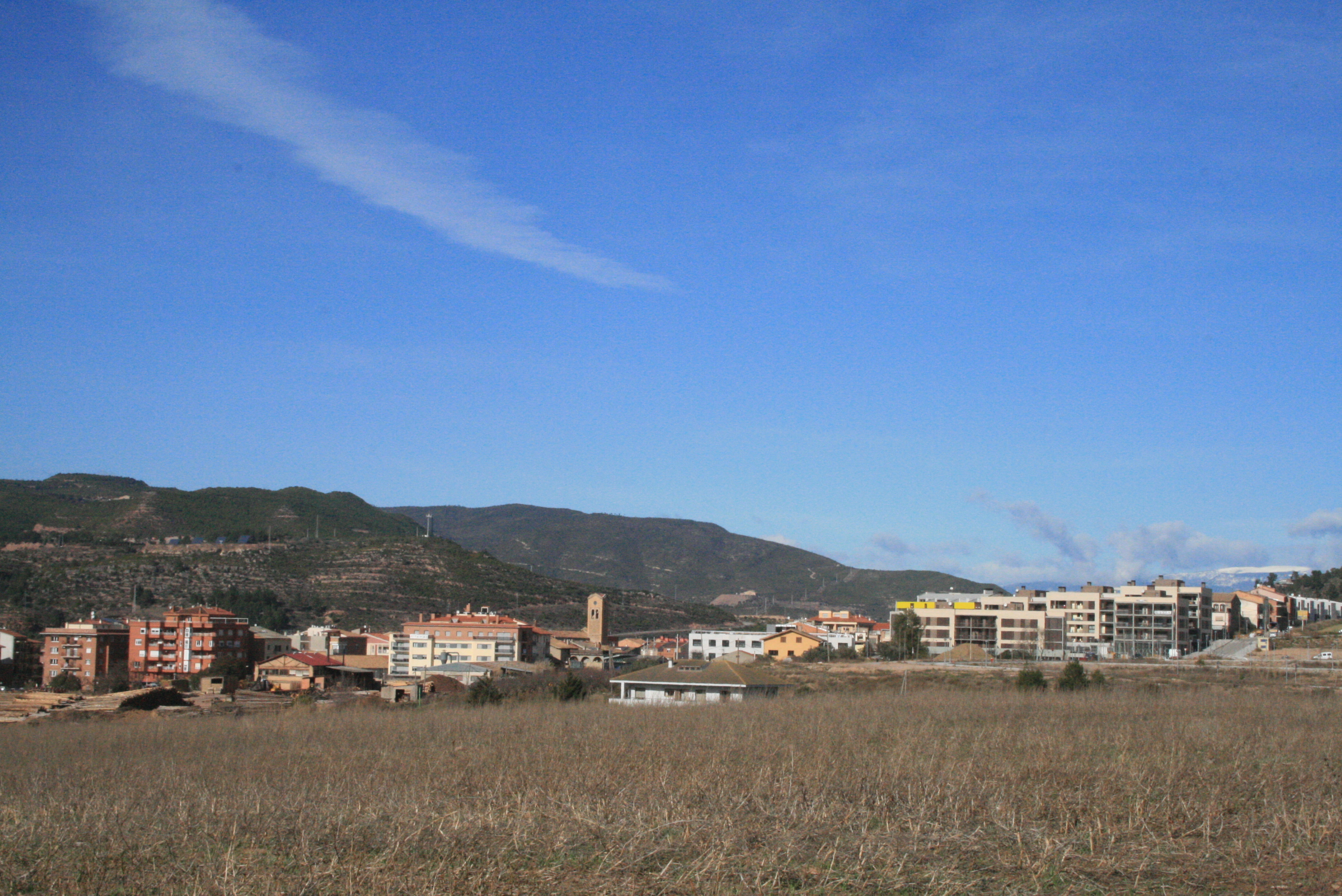
- Callús

- Coat of arms

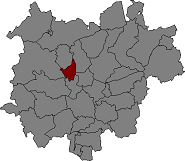
- Callús in Bages Comarca

- Location in Catalonia Callús (Spain)
- Coordinates: 41.782°N 1.784°E
- Country: Spain
- Community: Catalonia
- Province: Barcelona
- Comarca: Bages

Government
  - Mayor: Elisabeth Hernández (2023)

Area
  - Total: 12.39 km^{2} (4.78 sq mi)

Population (November 1, 2011)
  - Total: 1,918
  - Density: 154.8/km^{2} (401/sq mi)
- Website: Official website

Callús (Catalan pronunciation: [kəˈʎus]) is a municipality in the province of Barcelona and autonomous community of Catalonia, Spain. The municipality covers an area of 12.5 square kilometres (4.8 sq mi) and the population in 2014 was 1,985, 158.8 inhabitants per square kilometre (411/sq mi).

== Demography ==
According to Spanish census data,

1981	1991	2001	2011
1,527	1,396	1,338	1,918
