= Fidenae =

Ancient town of Latium

Coordinates: 41°58′44″N 12°30′43″E

Fidenae (Ancient Greek: Φιδῆναι) was an ancient town of Latium vetus, situated about 8 km north of Rome on the Via Salaria. Its inhabitants were known as Fidenates. As the Tiber was the border between Etruria and Latium, the left-bank settlement of Fidenae represented an extension of Etruscan presence into Latium, or a Latin border town. The site of the arx of the ancient town was probably on the hill on which lies the contemporary Villa Spada, though no traces of early buildings or defences are to be seen; pre-Roman tombs are in the cliffs to the north. The later village lay at the foot of the hill on the eastern edge of the high-road, and its curia, with a dedicatory inscription to Marcus Aurelius by the Senatus Fidenatium, was excavated in 1889. Remains of other buildings may also be seen.

Map showing the location of Fidenae.

In 27 AD the town was the site of what was probably the worst stadium disaster in history, in which at least 20,000 people were killed when a poorly-built wooden stadium collapsed.

== History ==
=== Conflicts with the Roman kingdom ===
Considered an Etruscan, but also a Latin settlement of Alban foundation—archeological findings proved a Latial origin—it was at the frontier of Roman territory and occasionally changed hands between Rome and Veii.

In the 8th century BC, during the reign of Rome's first king, Romulus, the Fidenates and the Veientes were defeated in a war with Rome, according to legend. It may be that a colony was established there after the defeat, as Livy afterward describes Fidenae as a Roman colony.

Fidenae and Veii were defeated by Rome in the mid 7th century BC during the reign of Rome's third king Tullus Hostilius, and again by Rome's fifth king Tarquinius Priscus in the early 6th century BC.

=== Conflicts with the Roman Republic ===
In the early Roman Republic, Fidenae made a decision that was to cost them much of their land in favor of the new Claudia gens, formed from Sabine defectors. Lucius Tarquinius Superbus, last king of Rome, having been expelled from it, at first looked for intervention from the Etruscans. Lars Porsenna of Clusium, dissatisfied with Superbus' conduct and ethics, made peace with the new republic.

The Tarquins then subverted Latium. Sextus Tarquinius, whose rape of Lucretia had triggered the overthrow of the monarchy (if he was not assassinated at Gabii), convinced the Sabines to go to war against Rome, arguing that the expulsion of the kings had annulled previous treaties. The Tarquins were now interested in Latin intervention. After some minor conflicts in which Rome was victorious, the Sabines took a vote and resolved to invade Rome (perhaps with the previous example in mind). The Tarquins brought in Fidenae and Cameria, formerly Roman allies.

The total defeat of the Sabines in 505/504 BC was followed by the siege of Fidenae. The city was taken only a few days later: the Romans assembled their prisoners. They executed the senior officers before them (whipped by the rods and beheaded by the axe of the fasces, a standard punishment for treason), let the rest go with a stern warning. A garrison was placed in Fidenae, and its members were given much of its land. The Claudii are not mentioned in connection with the battle. Still, they had been given land north of the Anio river, some of which was at Fidenae. They could collect on that offer only if Fidenae was defeated, implying that they were invited to participate in the campaign; they may even have been the garrison.

Fidenae appears to have fallen permanently under Roman domination after its capture in 435 BC by the Romans, and is described by classical authors as almost deserted in their time. It seems, however, to have had some importance as a post station.

=== Stadium disaster ===
In 27 AD, an apparently cheaply built wooden amphitheatre constructed by an entrepreneur named Atilius collapsed in Fidenae, resulting in what was said to be the worst stadium disaster in history, with at least 20,000 killed and many more injured out of the total audience of 50,000.

The emperor Tiberius had banned gladiatorial games. When the prohibition was lifted, the public had flocked to the earliest events, so a large crowd was present when the stadium collapsed. At the time of the incident, Tiberius was in Capri, where he had a secure getaway, but he rushed to Fidenae to assist the victims.

The Roman Senate responded to the tragedy by banning people with a fortune of less than 400,000 sestertii from hosting gladiator shows, and by requiring that all future amphitheatres be erected on a sound foundation and inspected and certified as such. The government also "banished" Atilius.

A digital reconstruction found the reported casualties to be consistent with a wooden structure similar in size to the still-standing stone structure of the amphitheatre in Verona.

== See also ==
- Roman–Etruscan Wars
