= Lucius Valerius Potitus (consul 392 BC) =

Late 5th-century BC Roman statesman and general

Lucius Valerius Potitus (fl. c. 414–390 BC) was a five time consular tribune, in 414, 406, 403, 401 and 398 BC, and two times consul, in 393 and 392 BC, of the Roman Republic.

Valerius belonged to the Valeria gens, one of the oldest and most prominent patrician gens of the early Republic. Filiations tell us that Valerius father was named Lucius and his grandfather was named Publius. Both are unattested in the consular lists and seems to have held no known political offices. It remains unclear of Valerius relation to his namesake, Lucius Valerius Poplicola Potitus, the consul of 449 BC but Ogilvie, in his reading of Livy, names him as Valerius father. There is a possibility, depending on how one reads the filiations, that the contemporary consular Gaius Valerius Potitus Volusus was his brother. Filiations indicate that Publius Valerius Potitus Poplicola, six time consular tribune, was the son of Valerius.

== Career ==
=== Consular tribune (414–398 BC) ===
Valerius first held the imperium in 414 BC as one of four consular tribunes. His colleagues in the office were Gnaeus Cornelius Cossus, Quintus Fabius Vibulanus and Publius Postumius Albinus Regillensis, with the exception of Fabius all consulars were newcomers to the imperium. The consulars fought a successful war against the Aequi which resulted in the capture of Bolae. This newly captured territory came to be a focal point for strife as Marcus Sextius, a tribune of the plebs, proposed an agrarian law to colonize Bolae while blaming the consular Postumius for misconduct. The conflict would culminate in a mutiny among the Roman soldiers stationed at Bolae resulting in the death of both Postumius, the consular, and a Roman quaestor, Publius Sestius. It is unclear what the role of Valerius was during these events. The conflict involving Postumius might be a fabrication added by Livy to improve the narrative. To this narrative Livy also adds an increasing fears among the patricians that a plebeian could be elected as consular tribune which leads to the return of the ordinary consulship for the years 413–409 BC.

Valerius could have been one of the unknown censors who completed the lustrum in between 417 and 404 BC as suggested by the classicist Jaakko Suolahti. Suolahti, drawing from the fact that the census described in 403 BC is numbered lustrum XVI and counting from lustrum X which was held in 459 BC only gives us four pairs of censors (in 443, 435, 430 and 418 BC), thus a missing lustrum XV. Additionally drawing upon a gap in the Fasti Capitolini from 414 to 410 BC the censorship can likely be placed within this timeframe, with Suolahti leaning towards the year 410 BC. Suolahti's main suggestions for these unknown censors are Spurius Nautius Rutilus and Manius Aemilius Mamercinus but adds Valerius as one of the viable options. While Suolahti argues for the existence of these unknown censors and lustrum XV, these possible candidates should be noted, and is noted by the author himself, are simply educated guesses based on the suitability of the candidates to the office and are in the authors words "mere suppositions".

Valerius would hold his second term as consular tribune in 406 BC together with three relatives of his former colleagues in 414 BC: Publius Cornelius Rutilus Cossus, Gnaeus Cornelius Cossus and Numerius Fabius Ambustus. The year saw war against the Volsci and the Veii with Valerius commanding the army at Antium. While previous battles had been defensive battles fought close to Algidus this year saw the Romans gaining ground against the Volscians. The consulars implemented a new law dictating pay for soldiers pushing Rome towards a professionalized army. Diodorus in his account of this year omits Gnaeus Cornelius from the college and Livy, while describing the actions of the others, lets Cornelius play a passive part and remaining in Rome, which might indicate the college consisted of only three members, Rutilus, Fabius and Valerius.

In 403 BC Valerius held his third consular tribuneship. He shared the office with Manius Aemilius Mamercinus. Appius Claudius Crassus Inregillensis, Marcus Quinctilius Varus. Lucius Julius Iulus and Marcus Furius Fusus. The college, with the exception of Aemilius and Valerius, were all first time consulars. Livy, when writing of this college, incorrectly includes the two censors Marus Furius Camillus and Marus Postumius Albinus Regillensis into the consular college. The year saw the continuation of the war started in 406 BC against the Veii with all consulars (including Valerius) leading armies against the Veii with the exception of Claudius who remained in Rome. The long years of war and new payments towards the soldiers seems to have strained the economy of Rome and the two censors, Camillus and Postumius imposed new taxes targeting bachelors and orphans.

Two years later, in 401 BC, Valerius would again be elected to the role of consular tribune. He shared the office with two former colleagues, Cossus from 406 BC and Aemilius from 403 BC, and three others, Camillus (the censor from 403 BC), Lucius Julius Iulus (close relative of his former colleague Julius) and Caeso Fabius Ambustus (brother of his former colleague Fabius in 406 BC). The year saw war against the Volsci, Falerii, Veii and the Capena. Valerius held the command in Anxur against the Volscians. Considering that Rome had been defeated in 402 BC at Veii while being led by a young and inexperienced consular college, this college Valerius was part of consisted of exceptionally experienced consulars. Outside of war there was continued civil strife within Rome with a conflict involving three of the plebeian tribunes, Marcus Acutius, Gaius Lacerius and Gnaeus Trebonius, in regards to the Lex Trebonia. Additionally there was legal procedures against two former consulars Lucius Verginius Tricostus Esquilinus and Manius Sergius Fidenas, led by the other three plebeian tribunes and targeting the consulars for their conduct and defeat against the Veientanes and Faliscans. Eventually the plebeian tribunes united under a proposal of a new agrarian law. Diodorus in his accounts of this year omits Valerius as one of the consulars, but Valerius is confirmed by our other sources.

Valerius was elected for a fifth and final term as consular tribune in 398 BC. He shared the office with one former colleague, Camillus, and four others, Marcus Valerius Lactucinus Maximus, Lucius Furius Medullinus (brother of Camillus), Quintus Servilius Fidenas and Quintus Sulpicius Camerinus Cornutus. War continued against the Falsci and the Veii with Valerius in command against the Falsci. Valerius fought successfully and ravaged the territory of the Falscians. His colleagues with the exception of Camillus, who remained in Rome, continued the Siege of Veii. A natural phenomena occurred at the Alban lake resulting in an embassy being sent to Delphi to consult the Oracle of Apollo. There is some uncertainty in regards if the Valerius Potitus mentioned among the ambassadors should be identified as Valerius or his close relative Gaius Valerius Potitus Volusus. The other members of the embassy were Gnaeus Cornelius Cossus, Publius Licinius Calvus Esquilinus and a Fabius Ambustus (either Caeso or Numerius), all, with the exception of Licinius, former colleagues of Valerius. The embassy would return in 397 BC. Valerius role as consular tribune is somewhat doubted as Diodorus (similar to 401 BC) omits him from this college and Livys inclusion of Valerius seems like a duplication.

=== Ambassador and Interrex (397–394 BC) ===
In 396 BC Valerius was appointed as Interrex to hold the elections of the consulars. There were two other known interreges, Camillus and Servilius, appointed during this comitia and it is unclear who completed the election. This was the same year as the Siege of Veii was successfully ended.

Valerius would again be appointed as an ambassador to Delphi in 394 BC. He together with Lucius Sergius Fidenas and Aulus Manlius Vulso Capitolinus were sent to deliver offerings to Apollo as thanks for the Roman success in the siege of Veii. The embassy was ambushed and captured by Liparean pirates under the command of Timasitheus who in the end set them free to complete their offering to Apollo. There is a possibility that the Lucius Valerius that took part in this embassy was Lucius Valerius Poplicola, both Broughton and Oglivie prefer the elder Valerius. Some ancient sources such as Diodorus, place this embassy in 396 BC in combination with the fall of Veii.

=== Consulships and second term as Interrex (393–391 BC) ===
The following year, in 393 BC, Valerius was elected as consul together with Publius Cornelius Maluginensis but for reasons unknown they never entered office and two new consuls, Lucius Lucretius Tricipitinus Flavus and Servius Sulpicius Camerinus, were elected to replace them. The return of the consulship over the consular tribunes is theorized to be because of the reduced external threat with the defeat of Veii and their allies.

Valerius was again elected as consul in 392 BC with Marcus Manlius Capitolinus as his colleague. The year saw war against the Aequi which was successfully conducted by both consuls. Manlius was awarded the minor triumph, ovatio, while Valerius was awarded and celebrated a full triumph. Having concluded the war the consuls abdicated in favor of the return of a college of consular tribunes as a new threat from the Gauls was looming. Valerius was again appointed as one of the Interreges to help complete the comitia for the consular college of 391 BC. His colleagues as interreges were, once again, Camillus and a newcomer Publius Cornelius Scipio.

=== Sack of Rome and third term as Interrex (390–387 BC) ===
The wars of Rome would by 390 BC involve a new enemy from outside the local region. The Celts from the Po Valley under the leadership of Brennus had marched southward and after a failed embassy from Rome decided to invade Roman territory. The Romans were defeated in the Battle of the Allia and Rome itself was now threatened. Camillus, the former colleague of Valerius, was recalled from exile (he had been exiled in 391 BC for his conduct in the aftermath of his triumph and victory against the Veii) and appointed dictator. Camillus appointed Valerius as his magister equitum (co-dictator). Camillus and Valerius succeeded with pushing back the Gauls who had by then captured all of Rome with the exception of the Capitoline. They stayed in office after this victory to stop a proposal of abandoning Rome and for Camillus to celebrate a triumph.

There is a possibility that the magister equitum, named as Lucius Valerius by Livy, is not Potitus but rather his relative and contemporary Lucius Valerius Poplicola. Broughton, following Degrassi, considers Potitus the more probable alternative, while Ogilvie prefers either of the candidates but considers the office itself as "unhistorical".

Valerius final appearance in our sources is in 387 BC as Interrex, this time together with Marcus Manlius Capitolinus, his former consular colleague, and Servius Sulpicius Camerinus, the consul who replaced him in 392 BC.

Thus, after 27 years and 12 magistracies one of the early Republics most distinguished, and to some degree mysteriously unknown, figures disappear from our records.

== The literary tradition of the Early Roman Republic ==
This period of the Roman Republic is supported by few and unreliable sources. The ancient historian Livy remains one of the most influential for this period but he is more or less a tertiary source and bases most of his writings on the works of previous historians, such as the lost writings of Aelius Tubero, Licinius Macer, Valerius Antias and Fabius Pictor. The Greek historian Diodorus Siculus covers this period in detail in Bibliotheca historica, but the work remains discussed in regards to precedence over the accounts of Livy. A third, equally controversial, source is the Fasti and derivatives of it, such as the Chronograph of 354. Most modern researchers believe that, to a degree, these ancient writings contain truths, even if these occasionally are mere grains of truths, and that they should be treated sceptically and critically. The archaeological evidences generally show a decline in Rome during the days of the young Republic but with an increase in infrastructure and wealth first by the late 4th century BC. Descriptions of the same events usually differing between different authors and inscriptions, which suggests that the sources used by Livy and his contemporaries were in themselves in disagreement.

As Livy, Diodorus and the Fasti are in agreement in regards to most of the narratives surrounding Valerius, one should consider this individual of the early Roman Republic to at least have existed and held several if not all of the offices listed above. But, as the classicist Broughton adds, this period in the history of the Republic is filled with interpolations and discrepancies between sources and should be viewed sceptically.

Political offices
Preceded by Publius Cornelius; Gaius Valerius; Quintus Quinctius; Numerius Fabius	Roman consular tribune 414 BC with Gnaeus Cornelius; Quintus Fabius; Publius Postumius	Succeeded by Cornelius Cossus; Lucius Furius as consuls
Preceded by Lucius Furius; Gaius Valerius; Numerius Fabius; Gaius Servilius	Roman consular tribune II; 406 BC with Publius Cornelius; Gnaeus Cornelius; Numerius Fabius	Succeeded by Titus Quinctius; Quintus Quinctius; Gaius Julius; Aulus Manlius; Lucius Furius; Manius Aemilius
Preceded by Gaius Valerius; Manius Sergius; Publius Cornelius; Gnaeus Cornelius; Caeso Fabius; Spurius Nautius	Roman consular tribune III; 403 BC with Manius Aemilius, Marcus Quinctilius; Lucius Julius, Appius Claudius, Marcus Furius	Succeeded by Gaius Servilius; Quintus Servilius; Lucius Verginius; Quintus Sulpicius; Aulus Manlius; Manius Sergius
Preceded by Gaius Servilius; Quintus Servilius; Lucius Verginius; Quintus Sulpicius; Aulus Manlius; Manius Sergius	Roman consular tribune IV; 401 BC with Gnaeus Cornelius, Marcus Furius; Manius Aemilius, Caeso Fabius, Lucius Julius	Succeeded by Publius Licinius; Publius Manlius; Lucius Titinius; Publius Maelius; Spurius Furius; Lucius Publilius
Preceded by Gnaeus Genucius; Lucius Atilius; Marcus Pomponius; Gaius Duillius; Marcus Veturius; Volero Publilius	Roman consular tribune V 398 BC with Marcus Valerius, Marcus Furius; Lucius Furius, Quintus Servilius, Quintus Sulpicius	Succeeded by Lucius Julius; Lucius Furius; Lucius Sergius; Aulus Postumius; Publius Cornelius; Aulus Manlius
Preceded by Marcus Furius; Lucius Furius; Gaius Aemilius; Lucius Valerius; Spurius Postumius; Publius Cornelius as consular tribunes	Roman consul 393 BC (invalidated) with Cornelius Maluginensis	Succeeded by Lucius Lucretius; Servius Sulpicius
Preceded by Lucius Lucretius; Servius Sulpicius	Roman consul II; 392 BC with Marcus Manlius Capitolinus	Succeeded by Lucius Lucretius; Servius Sulpicius; Lucius Aemilius; Lucius Furius; Agrippa Furius; Gaius Aemilius as consular tribunes
