= Gnaeus Cornelius Cossus (consular tribune 406 BC) =

Late 5th century BC Roman Republican consular tribune

Gnaeus Cornelius Cossus was a consular tribune of the Roman Republic in 406, 404 and 401 BC.

Cornelius belonged to the Cornelia gens, one of the older patrician gentes of the Republic. Cornelius' father, taken from filiations, was named Publius which would identify him as either Publius Cornelius Cossus, consular tribune in 415, or Publius Cornelius Cossus, consular tribune in 408 BC. Publius Cornelius Cossus, consular tribune in 395 BC, shares the same filiation as Cornelius and might thus be a brother. There are no known children or descendants of Cornelius.

== Career ==
Cornelius first held the imperium in 406 BC as one of four consular tribunes. His colleagues in the office were Publius Cornelius Rutilus Cossus, Numerius Fabius Vibulanus and Lucius Valerius Potitus; with the exception of Valerius all consulars were newcomers to the imperium. The year saw the continuation of the war with the Volscians and the start of a new conflict with Veii. Cornelius, one can assume, remained in Rome, while his three colleagues held command in Ecetrae, Anxur and Antium respectively. The consulars oversaw a reform introducing pay for the army.

Cornelius would be re-elected to the tribuneship in 404 BC as part of a larger six-man consular college. He shared the office with Gaius Valerius Potitus Volusus, Manius Sergius Fidenas, Publius Cornelius Maluginensis, Caeso Fabius Ambustus and Spurius Nautius Rutilus. The consulars successfully fought against the Volsci and Veii, capturing Artena from Volsci and continuing the siege of Veii. There was also a successful venture to colonize Velitrae under the command of the consulars.

Cornelius was elected for a third and final term as consular tribune in 401 BC. The college was exceptionally experienced and included several individuals who had held the imperium on repeated occasions. Cornelius' colleagues were the experienced Lucius Valerius Potitus (for a second time sharing the office with Cornelius and his fourth term in total), Marcus Furius Camillus (censor in 403), Manius Aemilius Mamercinus (fourth consular command), Caeso Fabius Ambustus (second time sharing the office with Cornelius and his second term in total) and a newcomer, Lucius Julius Iulus. The war with the Volsci and Veii remained the main focus of the consulars and Cornelius held command at Capena with his colleagues spread throughout the surrounding regions. Rome was also the site of increased internal strife giving rise to conflicts both within the consular colleges and among the tribunes of the plebs. Lucius Verginius Tricostus Esquilinus and Manius Sergius Fidenas, two of the consular tribunes from the previous year, were convicted, by the tribunes of the plebs, for their actions during a defeat of the Roman army at Veii. Further conflict arose within the college of plebeian tribunes in regards to the Lex Trebonia, with the college eventually uniting to propose an Agrarian law.

Cornelius is last mentioned in our sources as one of four ambassadors sent in 398 BC to consult with the Oracle at Delphi. His co-ambassadors were Publius Licinius Calvus Esquilinus, Valerius (the sources disagree on whether Gaius, his colleague in 404, or Lucius, his colleague in 406 and 401 BC was the ambassador for this mission) and one of the Fabii Ambusti (his former colleague Caeso or his brother Numerius Fabius Ambustus). The reason for the embassy was a portentous rise in the Alban Lake. The embassy would return to Rome in 397 BC.

== See also ==
- Cornelia gens – Ancient Roman family

Political offices
Preceded by Numerius Fabius Vibulanus; Lucius Furius Medullinus; Gaius Servilius Ahala; Gaius Valerius Potitus Volusus	Consular tribune of the Roman Republic with Publius Cornelius Rutilus Cossus; Lucius Valerius Potitus; Numerius Fabius Ambustus; 406 BC	Succeeded by Quintus Quinctius Cincinnatus; Gaius Julius Iulus; Aulus Manlius Vulso Capitolinus; Lucius Furius Medullinus; Manius Aemilius Mamercinus
Preceded by Titus Quinctius Capitolinus Barbatus, Aulus Manlius Vulso Capitolinus, Quintus Quinctius Cincinnatus, Lucius Furius Medullinus, Gaius Iulius Iullus, Manius Aemilius Mamercinus	Consular tribune of the Roman Republic with Spurius Nautius Rutilus, Gaius Valerius Potitus Volusus, Manius Sergius Fidenas, Publius Cornelius Maluginensis, and Caeso Fabius Ambustus; 404 BC	Succeeded by Manius Aemilius Mamercinus, Marcus Quinctilius Varus, Lucius Valerius Potitus, Lucius Iulius Iullus, Appius Claudius Crassus Inregillensis, Marcus Furius Fusus
Preceded by Gaius Servilius Ahala; Quintus Sulpicius Camerinus Cornutus; Quintus Servilius Fidenas; Aulus Manlius Vulso Capitolinus; Lucius Verginius Tricostus Esquilinus; Manius Sergius Fidenas	Consular tribune of the Roman Republic with Lucius Valerius Potitus, Marcus Furius Camillus; Manius Aemilius Mamercinus, Caeso Fabius Ambustus, Lucius Julius Iulus; 401 BC	Succeeded by Publius Licinius Calvus Esquilinus; Publius Manlius Vulso; Publius Maelius Capitolinus; Spurius Furius Medullinus; Lucius Publilius Philo Vulscus; Lucius Titinius Pansa Saccus
