= Publius Cornelius Maluginensis (consular tribune 404 BC) =

Roman Republic consular tribune (404 BC)

Publius Cornelius Maluginensis was a consular tribune of the Roman Republic in 404 BC.

Cornelius belonged to the Cornelia gens, one of the older patrician gentes of the Republic. Cornelius' father, and grandfather were both named Marcus, possible identifying them with Marcus Cornelius Maluginensis, consul 436 BC, and Marcus Cornelius Maluginensis, decemviri in 450 BC, respectively. Publius Cornelius Maluginensis, consular tribune 397 BC, Servius Cornelius Maluginensis, consular tribune 386 BC, and possibly Marcus Cornelius Maluginensis, censor 393 BC, seems to all be his sons based on filiations.

== Career ==
Cornelius held the imperium in 404 BC as one of six consular tribunes. He shared the office with Gaius Valerius Potitus Volusus, Manius Sergius Fidenas, Gnaeus Cornelius Cossus, Caeso Fabius Ambustus and Spurius Nautius Rutilus. The consulars successfully fought against the Volsci and Veii, capturing Artena from Volsci and continuing the siege of Veii. There was also a successful venture to colonize Velitrae under the command of the consulars. There is some doubt among modern scholars in regards to the historicity of these consular colleges of six and there are indications of a higher degree of interpolation during this period.

There is a possibility, quite unlikely, that Cornelius is the unknown Publius Cornelius who was consular tribune for a second time in 394 BC. Broughton and Ogilvie, in commenting on the consular of 394 would instead prefer Cornelius namesake and son, the consular tribune of 397 BC, to fill that gap. Other plausible candidates, listed by Broughton and Ogilvie, include Publius Cornelius Cossus, consular tribune 395 BC, and Publius Cornelius Scipio, consular tribune 395 BC.

== Conflicting identity ==
There is a lack of consensus among modern scholars in regards to the identity of Cornelius and the other members of the Cornelii during this period of the Republic. The main problem lies in the filiations presented to these Cornelii and the sheer amount of Cornelii in the Fasti of the consular tribunes. Ogilvie therefor suggests that this Cornelius should instead be identified as the same individual as Publius Cornelius Cossus, the consular tribune of 415 BC, and having been consular tribune in 415, 408, 406, 404 BC and dictator in 408 BC.

== See also ==
- Cornelia gens – Ancient Roman family

Political offices
Preceded by Titus Quinctius Capitolinus Barbatus, Aulus Manlius Vulso Capitolinus, Quintus Quinctius Cincinnatus, Lucius Furius Medullinus, Gaius Iulius Iullus, Manius Aemilius Mamercinus	Consular tribune of the Roman Republic with Spurius Nautius Rutilus, Gaius Valerius Potitus Volusus, Manius Sergius Fidenas, Gnaeus Cornelius Cossus, and Caeso Fabius Ambustus; 404 BC	Succeeded by Manius Aemilius Mamercinus, Marcus Quinctilius Varus, Lucius Valerius Potitus, Lucius Iulius Iullus, Appius Claudius Crassus Inregillensis, Marcus Furius Fusus
