= Manius Aemilius Mamercinus =

Late 5th century BC Roman consul and consular tribune

Manius Aemilius Mamercinus was a three-time consular tribune, in 405, 403 and 401 and also consul in 410 BC, of the Roman Republic.

Aemilius belonged to the Aemilia gens, one of the oldest and most prominent patrician gens of the early Republic. Aemilius' father was the thrice appointed dictator Mamercus Aemilius Mamercinus. Therefore, the seven-time consular tribune Lucius Aemilius Mamercinus was his brother. Manius Aemilius Mamercinus had no known descendants and later Aemilii Mamercini trace their ancestry to his brother Lucius.

== Career ==
=== Consulship (410 BC) ===
Aemilius first held the imperium in 410 BC as one of the two ordinary consuls of that year. His colleague in the office was Gaius Valerius Potitus Volusus. The consuls fought a successful war against the Aequi and the Volsci which resulted in the capture of the fortress of Arx Carventana. One of the consuls (most likely Valerius) were granted an ovatio for this. Their continued efforts in the war were hampered by the actions of the tribune of the plebs, Marcus Menenius, who vetoed a proposed levy while proposing a new agrarian law.

=== Military tribune with consular powers (405 - 401 BC) ===
Aemilius held the imperium for a second time in 405 BC, this time as consular tribune. He shared the office with five others, Titus Quinctius Capitolinus Barbatus, Quintus Quinctius Cincinnatus, Gaius Julius Iulus, Aulus Manlius Vulso Capitolinus and Lucius Furius Medullinus, of which all were former consular tribunes with the exception of Manlius. The consular tribunes saw success against the Veii and began the "siege of Veii" which would last for ten years.

In 403 BC Aemilius held his second consular tribuneship. He shared the office with Lucius Valerius Potitus (brother of his former colleague Volusus), Appius Claudius Crassus Inregillensis, Marcus Quinctilius Varus. Lucius Julius Iulus and Marcus Furius Fusus. Unlike his previous consular tribuneship this primarily consisted of newcomers to the imperium. The year saw the continuation of the war started in 406 BC against the Veii with all the consular tribunes (including Aemilius) leading armies against the Veii with the exception of Claudius who remained in Rome. The long years of war and new payments for the soldiers seemed to have strained the economy of Rome and the two censors, Marcus Furius Camillus and Marcus Postumius Albinus Regillensis imposed new taxes targeting bachelors and orphans.

Two years later, in 401 BC, Aemilius was again elected to the role of consular tribune. He shared the office with his former colleague, Valerius from 403 BC, and four others, Camillus (the censor from 403 BC), Lucius Julius Iulus (close relative of his former colleague Julius), Caeso Fabius Ambustus and Gnaeus Cornelius Cossus. The year saw war against the Volsci, Falerii, Veii and the Capena. Aemilius held the command against the Veii. Outside of war there was continued civil strife within Rome with a conflict involving three of the plebeian tribunes, Marcus Acutius, Gaius Lacerius and Gnaeus Trebonius, over the Lex Trebonia. Additionally there was legal procedures against two former consular tribunes, Lucius Verginius Tricostus Esquilinus and Manius Sergius Fidenas, led by the other three plebeian tribunes and targeting the consular tribunes for their conduct and being defeated in battles against the Veientanes and Faliscans. Eventually the plebeian tribunes united in supporting a proposed a new agrarian law.

== See also ==
- Aemilia gens – Ancient Roman family
- Battle of Veii – Historical conflict

Political offices
Preceded by Spurius Nautius Rutilus; Marcus Papirius Mugillanus	Consul of the Roman Republic with Gaius Valerius Potitus Volusus; 410 BC	Succeeded by Gnaeus Cornelius Cossus; Lucius Furius Medullinus
Preceded by Publius Cornelius Rutilus Cossus; Gnaeus Cornelius Cossus; Numerius Fabius Ambustus; Lucius Valerius Potitus	Consular tribune of the Roman Republic with Quintus Quinctius Cincinnatus; Gaius Julius Iulus; Aulus Manlius Vulso Capitolinus; Lucius Furius Medullinus; 405 BC	Succeeded by Spurius Nautius Rutilus; Gnaeus Cornelius Cossus; Manius Sergius Fidenas; Publius Cornelius Maluginensis; Caeso Fabius Ambustus; Gaius Valerius Potitus Volusus
Preceded by Spurius Nautius Rutilus; Gnaeus Cornelius Cossus; Manius Sergius Fidenas; Publius Cornelius Maluginensis; Caeso Fabius Ambustus; Gaius Valerius Potitus Volusus	Consular tribune of the Roman Republic with Lucius Valerius Potitus, Marcus Quinctilius Varus; Lucius Iulius Iullus, Appius Claudius Crassus Inregillensis, Marcus Furius Fusus; 403 BC	Succeeded by Gaius Servilius Ahala; Quintus Sulpicius Camerinus Cornutus; Quintus Servilius Fidenas; Aulus Manlius Vulso Capitolinus; Lucius Verginius Tricostus Esquilinus; Manius Sergius Fidenas
Preceded by Gaius Servilius Ahala; Quintus Sulpicius Camerinus Cornutus; Quintus Servilius Fidenas; Aulus Manlius Vulso Capitolinus; Lucius Verginius Tricostus Esquilinus; Manius Sergius Fidenas	Consular tribune of the Roman Republic with Gnaeus Cornelius Cossus, Marcus Furius Camillus; Lucius Valerius Potitus, Caeso Fabius Ambustus, Lucius Julius Iulus; 401 BC	Succeeded by Publius Licinius Calvus Esquilinus; Publius Manlius Vulso; Publius Maelius Capitolinus; Spurius Furius Medullinus; Lucius Publilius Philo Vulscus; Lucius Titinius Pansa Saccus
