= Quintus Sulpicius Camerinus Cornutus (consular tribune) =

Roman consular tribune in 402 BC and 398 BC

Quintus Sulpicius Camerinus Cornutus was a consular tribune of the Roman Republic in 402 and 398 BC.

Sulpicius belonged to the Sulpicia gens, a patrician gens which was flourishing during this period of the Republic. Sulpicius father or grandfather was Servius Sulpicius Camerinus Cornutus, consul in 461 BC and filiations indicate that Sulpicius himself was the father of Servius Sulpicius Camerinus, consul suffectus in 393 BC.

== Career ==
Sulpicius held the imperium in 402 BC as one of six consular tribunes. He shared the office with Gaius Servilius Ahala, Quintus Servilius Fidenas, Lucius Verginius Tricostus Esquilinus, Manius Sergius Fidenas and Aulus Manlius Vulso Capitolinus. There was much infighting between the consulars which would lead to the defeat of Sergius at Veii because his colleague Verginius refused him aid. Ahala, his other colleague, took matters into his own hands and forced the abdication of the entire college, including Sergius, to be replaced by a newly elected college. The defeat of the Romans at Veii should be treated as historical, but the reason (such as the rivalry between Sergius and Verginius) provided by ancient authors, such as Livy, should be viewed critically and sceptically, similar scepticism should be directed at the descriptions of the actions of Ahala. Sulpicius actions during his episode is unknown, but it would seem that it did not severely affect his career as he would be re-elected in 398 BC.

Sulpicius was elected for a second term as consular tribune in 398 BC. The college consisted of six members, Sulpicius and five others, Marcus Valerius Lactucinus Maximus, Lucius Furius Medullinus, Marcus Furius Camillus, Lucius Valerius Potitus and his former colleague Quintus Servilius Fidenas. War continued against the Falsci and the Veii. Sulpicius shared the command against the Veii together with Lactucinus, Medullinus and Servilius while Camillus remained in Rome and Potitus fought the Flasci. A natural phenomena occurred at the Alban lake resulting in an embassy of former consulars being sent to Delphi to consult the Oracle of Apollo.

== See also ==
- Sulpicia gens – Ancient Roman family
- Battle of Veii – Historical conflict

Political offices
Preceded by Lucius Valerius Potitus, Marcus Quinctilius Varus; Lucius Iulius Iullus, Appius Claudius Crassus Inregillensis, Marcus Furius Fusus; Manius Aemilius Mamercinus	Consular tribune of the Roman Republic with Gaius Servilius Ahala; Quintus Servilius Fidenas; Aulus Manlius Vulso Capitolinus; Lucius Verginius Tricostus Esquilinus; Manius Sergius Fidenas; 402 BC	Succeeded by Gnaeus Cornelius Cossus, Marcus Furius Camillus; Lucius Valerius Potitus, Caeso Fabius Ambustus, Lucius Julius Iulus; Manius Aemilius Mamercinus
Preceded by Gnaeus Genucius Augurinus; Lucius Atilius Priscus; Marcus Pomponius Rufus; Gaius Duillius Longus; Marcus Veturius Crassus Cicurinus; Volero Publilius Philo	Consular tribune of the Roman Republic with Marcus Valerius Lactucinus Maximus, Marcus Furius Camillus; Lucius Furius Medullinus, Quintus Servilius Fidenas, Lucius Valerius Potitus; 398 BC	Succeeded by Lucius Julius Iulus; Lucius Furius Medullinus; Lucius Sergius Fidenas; Aulus Postumius Albinus Regillensis; Publius Cornelius Maluginensis; Aulus Manlius Vulso Capitolinus
