= Marcus Furius Fusus =

Roman Republican consular tribune in 403 BC

Marcus Furius Fusus was a consular tribune of the Roman Republic in 403 BC.

Furius belonged to the Furia gens, an old and powerful patrician gentes of the Republic which had risen to become the most influential and powerful gens during the late 4th century BC with members such as Marcus Furius Camillus and Lucius Furius Medullinus. Furius seems to have been the son of Agrippa Furius Fusus, consul 446 BC or Gaius Furius Pacilus Fusus, consul 441 BC, and is not known to have had any prominent descendants himself.

== Career ==
Furius held the imperium in 403 BC as one of six consular tribunes. He shared the office with Manius Aemilius Mamercinus. Appius Claudius Crassus Inregillensis, Lucius Valerius Potitus. Lucius Julius Iulus and Marcus Quinctilius Varus. The college, with the exception of Aemilius and Valerius, were all first time consulars. Livy, when writing of this college, incorrectly includes the two censors Marus Furius Camillus and Marus Postumius Albinus Regillensis into the consular college. Livy also incorrectly has Marcus Postumius instead of Furius as one of the consular tribunes of this year. As other sources agree on Furius as the consular tribune for this year, this is generally seen to be a mistake made by the ancient historian or later transcribers. The year saw the continuation of the war started in 406 against the Veii with all consulars (including Furius) leading armies against the Veii, The only exception being Claudius who remained in Rome. The long years of war and new payments towards the soldiers seems to have strained the economy of Rome and the two censors, Camillus and Postumius imposed new taxes targeting bachelors and orphans.

According to Diodorus Siculus, Furius may have served as Censor alongside Lucius Papirius Mugillanus in 389 BC, however this censorship is not mentioned in Livy and the Fasti for this year is missing. For these reasons, the classicist Broughton considers this censorship as, "very doubtful".

== See also ==
- Furia gens – Ancient Roman family
- Battle of Veii – Historical conflict

Political offices
Preceded by Spurius Nautius Rutilus; Gnaeus Cornelius Cossus; Manius Sergius Fidenas; Publius Cornelius Maluginensis; Caeso Fabius Ambustus; Gaius Valerius Potitus Volusus	Consular tribune of the Roman Republic with Lucius Valerius Potitus, Manius Aemilius Mamercinus; Lucius Iulius Iullus, Appius Claudius Crassus Inregillensis, Marcus Quinctilius Varus; 403 BC	Succeeded by Gaius Servilius Ahala; Quintus Sulpicius Camerinus Cornutus; Quintus Servilius Fidenas; Aulus Manlius Vulso Capitolinus; Lucius Verginius Tricostus Esquilinus; Manius Sergius Fidenas
