= Appius Claudius Crassus (consular tribune 403 BC) =

Roman senator and dictator

Appius Claudius Crassus (fl. c. 403 BC) was a consular tribune of the Roman Republic in 403 BC.

== Career ==
Claudius held the imperium in 403 BC as one of six consular tribunes. He shared the office with Manius Aemilius Mamercinus. Marcus Quinctilius Varus, Lucius Valerius Potitus. Lucius Julius Iulus and Marcus Furius Fusus. The college, with the exception of Aemilius and Valerius, were all first time consulars. Livy, when writing of this college, incorrectly includes the two censors Marcus Furius Camillus and Marcus Postumius Albinus Regillensis into the consular college. The year saw the continuation of the war started in 406 against the Veii with all consulars leading armies against the Veii, with the exception of Claudius who remained in Rome. The long years of war and new payments towards the soldiers seems to have strained the economy of Rome and the two censors, Camillus and Postumius imposed new taxes targeting bachelors and orphans. During his tribuneship Claudius succeeded with passing a law which gave the tribunes of the plebs the possibility of vetoing each other. Claudius, in the words of Livy, gives a passionate and well-reasoned speech towards the tribunes, but the speech has striking similarities to other speeches described by Livy and shares many anecdotes and speech-patterns with that of Cicero, whom it is known Livy had read and studied. This episode is most likely an addition by Livy to "spice up" the story and the whole character of Claudius is of some historical uncertainty.

In 362 BC, Claudius was appointed as dictator when the consul, Lucius Genucius Aventinensis, was defeated and killed by the Hernici. As dictator Claudius won a costly victory against the Hernici. There is a possibility that he was awarded a triumph for this victory, although this is doubted by Broughton and Degrassi. It is unknown who acted as magister equitum during this dictatorship and it is only kept in the Fasti Capitolini as SCA.U.LA, possibly identifying him as Publius Cornelius Scapula, consul in 328 BC, but this identification is rejected by Broughton and Degrassi. A secondary (equally doubtful) identification is that of Mucius Scaevola, an otherwise unattested individual. Pinsent, in commenting on the dictator and magister equitum of 362 BC, concludes that both are most likely fictitious addition by Livy and should not be considered as historical.

There is also a possibility, although small and connected with the individual of the dictatorship, that Claudius should be considered the same individual as the consular of 349 BC. Holding the office as an elderly man little over a 50 years after his tribuneship. An argument in favour of this reading is that Livy described him as elderly and has him dying during this consulship. His imperium was transferred to the praetor, Lucius Pinarius Natta and later by the elections to Titus Manlius Imperiosus Torquatus as dictator. Although It is more probable that this consul of 349 BC is a distant cousin or a grandson to Claudius in according to the reading of the Fasti which has a different filiation compared to that of Claudius. Ogilvie, in his commentary on Livy, agrees with the Fasti but has the consular tribune of 403 BC having the same filiations, making him a nephew, not a son, of the consular of 424 BC. Adding to the confusion during this year is that Diodorus Siculus has Marcus Aemilius and Titus Quinctius as consuls this year, not Claudius or his colleague Lucius Furius Camillus. The classicist Suolahti, in his reading of the Fasti, identifies Claudius as the same individual as the dictator of 362 and of the consular of 349 BC.

Political offices
Preceded by Spurius Nautius Rutilus; Gnaeus Cornelius Cossus; Manius Sergius Fidenas; Publius Cornelius Maluginensis; Caeso Fabius Ambustus; Gaius Valerius Potitus Volusus	Consular tribune of the Roman Republic with Lucius Valerius Potitus, Manius Aemilius Mamercinus; Lucius Iulius Iullus, Marcus Quinctilius Varus, Marcus Furius Fusus; 403 BC	Succeeded by Gaius Servilius Ahala; Quintus Sulpicius Camerinus Cornutus; Quintus Servilius Fidenas; Aulus Manlius Vulso Capitolinus; Lucius Verginius Tricostus Esquilinus; Manius Sergius Fidenas
