= Aulus Manlius Vulso Capitolinus =

Roman consular tribune in 405, 402 and 397 BC

Aulus Manlius Vulso Capitolinus was a consular tribune of the Roman Republic in 405, 402 and 397 BC.

Manlius belonged to the Manlia gens, one of the oldest patrician gentes of the Republic. Manlius' father, taken from filiations, was named Aulus which would identify him as Aulus Manlius Vulso, decemviri 451 BC, or another otherwise unattested individual. His grandfather was most likely Gnaeus Manlius Cincinnatus, consul 480 BC but can also have been Gnaeus Manlius Vulso, consul 474 BC. Quintus Manlius Vulso Capitolinus, consular tribune 396 BC, and Titus Manlius Vulso Capitolinus were his brothers. Publius Manlius Capitolinus, dictator 368 BC, and Lucius Manlius Capitolinus Imperiosus, dictator 363 BC, seem to be the sons of Manlius based on their filiations.

== Career ==
Manlius first held the imperium in 405 BC as one of six consular tribunes. His colleagues in the office were Titus Quinctius Capitolinus Barbatus, Quintus Quintius Cincinnatus, Gaius Julius Iulus, Lucius Furius Medullinus and Manius Aemilius Mamercinus; Manlius was the only newcomer to the imperium, as all of his colleagues were consulares, the college was also unique in that it was the first year there were six consular tribunes. This year saw the beginning of the long and drawn out Siege of Veii. Diodorus has Mamilius instead of Manlius as consular tribune and only has the college consist of three members this year, which is believed to be a mistake by the ancient historian or by later transcribers. There is some doubt among modern scholars in regards to the historicity of these consular colleges of six and there are indications of a higher degree of interpolation during this period.

Manlius would be re-elected to the tribuneship in 402 BC, again as part of a six-man consular college. His colleagues were Gaius Servilius Ahala, Quintus Servilius Fidenas, Lucius Verginius Tricostus Esquilinus, Quintus Sulpicius Camerinus Cornutus and Manius Sergius Fidenas. There was much infighting between the consulars which would lead to the defeat of Sergius at Veii because his colleague Verginius refused him aid. Ahala, took matters into his own hands and forced the abdication of the entire college, including Manlius, to be replaced by a newly elected college. Diodorus only lists five members in his college of 402 BC and omits Q. Servilius. The defeat of the Romans at Veii should be treated as historical, but the reason (such as the rivalry between Sergius and Verginius) provided by ancient authors, such as Livy, should be viewed critically and sceptically, similar scepticism should be directed at the actions of Ahala.

Manlius was elected for a third and final term as consular tribune in 397 BC. He shared the office with his old co-consular Furius and four newcomers, Lucius Julius Iulus, Lucius Sergius Fidenas, Aulus Postumius Albinus Regillensis and Publius Cornelius Maluginensis. The year saw the return of an embassy of consulares sent to Delphi the previous year and war with several of Rome's neighbours. This included the Volsci, Aequi, Veii, Falisci, Capenates and the Tarquinii. Manlius and his colleagues were forced to abdicate because of faults in the election process and a new college was appointed. Julius and Furius is not included among the names provided by Diodorus on his college of 397 BC.

Manlius is last mentioned in our sources as one of three ambassadors sent to Delphi in 394 BC to give offerings to Apollo for the successful capture of Veii in 396 BC. The embassy consisted of Manlius and his two colleagues Lucius Valerius Potitus and Lucius Sergius Fidenas (his co-consular in 397 BC). The embassy was to convey an offering to the Oracle of Delphi and to Apollo but was captured by Liparean pirates under the command of the sicilian Greek Timasitheus. The pirates seems to have had a change of heart when they learned of the purpose of the embassy and the three consulares were released to continue their journey. This episode should be treated as largely historical as there are a few archaeological and inscriptiorial evidences connected with it. Although there is some disagreement between the sources in regards to the year, Diodorus gives 396 and Livy 394 BC, and the composition of the embassy as only Livy gives us names.

== See also ==
- Manlia gens – Roman family
- Battle of Veii – Historical conflict

Political offices
Preceded by Publius Cornelius Rutilus Cossus; Gnaeus Cornelius Cossus; Numerius Fabius Ambustus; Lucius Valerius Potitus	Consular tribune of the Roman Republic with Quintus Quinctius Cincinnatus; Gaius Julius Iulus; Titus Quinctius Capitolinus Barbatus; Lucius Furius Medullinus; Manius Aemilius Mamercinus; 405 BC	Succeeded by Gaius Valerius Potitus Volusus; Manius Sergius Fidenas; Publius Cornelius Maluginensis; Gnaeus Cornelius Cossus; Caeso Fabius Ambustus; Spurius Nautius Rutilus
Preceded by Lucius Valerius Potitus, Marcus Quinctilius Varus; Lucius Iulius Iullus, Appius Claudius Crassus Inregillensis, Marcus Furius Fusus; Manius Aemilius Mamercinus	Consular tribune of the Roman Republic with Quintus Sulpicius Camerinus Cornutus; Quintus Servilius Fidenas; Gaius Servilius Ahala; Lucius Verginius Tricostus Esquilinus; Manius Sergius Fidenas; 402 BC	Succeeded by Gnaeus Cornelius Cossus, Marcus Furius Camillus; Lucius Valerius Potitus, Caeso Fabius Ambustus, Lucius Julius Iulus; Manius Aemilius Mamercinus
Preceded by Marcus Valerius Lactucinus Maximus, Marcus Furius Camillus; Lucius Furius Medullinus, Quintus Servilius Fidenas, Quintus Sulpicius Camerinus Cornutus; Lucius Valerius Potitus	Consular tribune of the Roman Republic with Lucius Julius Iulus; Lucius Furius Medullinus; Lucius Sergius Fidenas; Aulus Postumius Albinus Regillensis; Publius Cornelius Maluginensis; 397 BC	Succeeded by Publius Licinius Calvus Esquilinus; Quintus Manlius Vulso Capitolinus; Publius Maelius Capitolinus; Gnaeus Genucius Augurinus; Lucius Atilius Priscus; Lucius Titinius Pansa Saccus
