= Manius Sergius Fidenas =

Roman Republican consular tribune in 404 and 402 BC

Manius Sergius Fidenas was a consular tribune of the Roman Republic in 404 and 402 BC.

Sergius belonged to the Sergia gens, a young patrician gentes of the Republic which had first risen to become consulares with Lucius Sergius Fidenas in 437 BC. Sergius' father, taken from filiations, was named Lucius which could identify him as the consular of 437 BC, or another otherwise unattested individual. Sergius had one known son Lucius Sergius Fidenas, consular tribune in 397 BC and possible another son or grandson named Gaius Sergius Fidenas Coxo, consular tribune in 387 BC.

== Career ==
Sergius first held the imperium in 404 BC as one of six consular tribunes. His colleagues in the office were Gaius Valerius Potitus Volusus, Publius Cornelius Maluginensis, Gnaeus Cornelius Cossus, Caeso Fabius Ambustus and Spurius Nautius Rutilus. The year saw the continuation of the war with Veii and the Volsci. Victories against the Volsci resulted in the capture of the town of Artena. The consulars also backed a colonization effort at Velitrae. Livy has Sergius with the praenomen Marcus during this year but all other sources agree that he was named Manius. There is some doubt among modern scholars in regards to the historicity of these consular colleges of six and there are indications of a higher degree of interpolation during this period.

Sergius would be re-elected to the tribuneship in 402 BC, again as part of a six-man consular college. His colleagues were Gaius Servilius Ahala, Quintus Servilius Fidenas, Lucius Verginius Tricostus Esquilinus, Quintus Sulpicius Camerinus Cornutus and Aulus Manlius Vulso Capitolinus. There was much infighting between the consulars which would lead to the defeat of Sergius at Veii because his colleague Verginius refused him aid. Ahala, his other colleague, took matters into his own hands and forced the abdication of the entire college, including Sergius, to be replaced by a newly elected college. The defeat of the Romans at Veii should be treated as historical, but the reason (such as the rivalry between Sergius and Verginius) provided by ancient authors, such as Livy, should be viewed critically and sceptically, similar scepticism should be directed at the actions of Ahala. Similarly as in 404 BC Livy has Sergius incorrectly named as Marcus.

The following year, in 401 BC, Sergius and Verginius were both prosecuted and convicted for their actions during their tenure as consular tribunes. The prosecutors were the tribunes of the plebs under the leadership of Publius Curiatius and Marcus Minucius. The whole trial is generally seen as anachronistic and an invention by Livy, who remains our only source in the matter. Some of the reasons includes the mention of monetary fines, which was yet to become custom in Rome, and the fact that both Curiatius and Minucius are patrician names and that prosecution rights should not have been given to the tribune of the plebs prior to the Lex Licinia Sextia of 368 BC.

== See also ==
- Sergia gens – Ancient Roman noble family
- Battle of Veii – Historical conflict

Political offices
| Preceded by Titus Quinctius Capitolinus Barbatus, Aulus Manlius Vulso Capitolinus, Quintus Quinctius Cincinnatus, Lucius Furius Medullinus, Gaius Iulius Iullus, Manius Aemilius Mamercinus | Consular tribune of the Roman Republic with Spurius Nautius Rutilus, Gaius Valerius Potitus Volusus, Gnaeus Cornelius Cossus, Publius Cornelius Maluginensis, and Caeso Fabius Ambustus; 404 BC | Succeeded by Manius Aemilius Mamercinus, Marcus Quinctilius Varus, Lucius Valerius Potitus, Lucius Iulius Iullus, Appius Claudius Crassus Inregillensis, Marcus Furius Fusus |
| Preceded by Lucius Valerius Potitus, Marcus Quinctilius Varus; Lucius Iulius Iullus, Appius Claudius Crassus Inregillensis, Marcus Furius Fusus; Manius Aemilius Mamercinus | Consular tribune of the Roman Republic with Quintus Sulpicius Camerinus Cornutus; Quintus Servilius Fidenas; Gaius Servilius Ahala; Lucius Verginius Tricostus Esquilinus; Aulus Manlius Vulso Capitolinus; 402 BC | Succeeded by Gnaeus Cornelius Cossus, Marcus Furius Camillus; Lucius Valerius Potitus, Caeso Fabius Ambustus, Lucius Julius Iulus; Manius Aemilius Mamercinus |
