= Marcus Quinctilius Varus =

Late 5th century BC Roman consular tribune

Marcus Quinctilius Varus was a consular tribune of the Roman Republic in 403 BC.

Quinctilius belonged to the Quinctilia gens, an obscure gens of the Republic which had produced one consular previously, Sextus Quinctilius Varus, consul in 453 BC. Quinctilius relationship to this previous consular is unknown and later Quinctilia first appear in our sources again in 203 BC during the end of the Second Punic War.

== Career ==
Quinctilius held the imperium in 403 BC as one of six consular tribunes. He shared the office with Manius Aemilius Mamercinus. Appius Claudius Crassus Inregillensis, Lucius Valerius Potitus. Lucius Julius Iulus and Marcus Furius Fusus. The college, with the exception of Aemilius and Valerius, were all first time consulars. Livy, when writing of this college, incorrectly includes the two censors Marus Furius Camillus and Marus Postumius Albinus Regillensis into the consular college. The year saw the continuation of the war started in 406 against the Veii with all consulars (including Quinctilius) leading armies against the Veii, with the exception of Claudius who remained in Rome. The long years of war and new payments towards the soldiers seems to have strained the economy of Rome and the two censors, Camillus and Postumius imposed new taxes targeting bachelors and orphans.

== See also ==
- Quinctilia gens – Ancient Roman family
- Battle of Veii – Historical conflict

Political offices
Preceded by Spurius Nautius Rutilus; Gnaeus Cornelius Cossus; Manius Sergius Fidenas; Publius Cornelius Maluginensis; Caeso Fabius Ambustus; Gaius Valerius Potitus Volusus	Consular tribune of the Roman Republic with Lucius Valerius Potitus, Manius Aemilius Mamercinus; Lucius Iulius Iullus, Appius Claudius Crassus Inregillensis, Marcus Furius Fusus; 403 BC	Succeeded by Gaius Servilius Ahala; Quintus Sulpicius Camerinus Cornutus; Quintus Servilius Fidenas; Aulus Manlius Vulso Capitolinus; Lucius Verginius Tricostus Esquilinus; Manius Sergius Fidenas
