= Gaius Servilius Ahala (consular tribune 408 BC) =

5th century BC Roman consular tribune and magister equitum

Gaius Servilius Ahala was a three time consular tribune of the Roman Republic in 408, 407 and 402 BC. He was also magister equitum in 408 BC.

Servilius belonged to the Servilia gens, an old and prominent patrician gens of the early Republic which rose to prominence in the middle of the 5th-century BC. Filiations suggest that Servilius' father was named Publius and his grandfather was named Quintus. Servilius' father can be assumed to be the otherwise unattested Publius Servilius Ahala. Servilius' grandfather could either be an otherwise unattested Quintus Servilius Ahala, the dictator in 435 BC, Quintus Servilius Priscus, or Quintus Servilius Priscus the consul in 468 BC. It is unclear if Servilius had any children of his own, but Gaius Servilius Ahala, magister equitum in 389 BC, is a possible son and Spurius Servilius Structus, consular tribune in 368 BC, is a possible grandson.

== Career ==
Servilius first held the imperium in 408 BC as one of the three elected consular tribunes for that year. His colleagues were Gaius Julius Iulus and Publius Cornelius Cossus. The year saw war with the Aequi and Volscians. Servilius, deeming his colleagues incapable of handling the situation, circumvented them by appointing a dictator, Publius Cornelius Rutilus Cossus. The newly appointed dictator, took over the imperium from the consular tribunes, and appointed Servilius as his second (magister equitum) and successfully campaigned against both the Aequi and Volsci.

Servilius' gamble of going against his consular colleagues does not seem to have any known repercussions as he was again elected as consular tribune the following year, in 407 BC. This new college consisted of four members with his new colleagues being Lucius Furius Medullinus, Gaius Valerius Potitus Volusus and Numerius Fabius Vibulanus. This new and very experienced college (all had previously held the imperium on several occasions ) could not repeat the success of the previous year and were defeated by the Volsci resulting in the loss of Verrugo.

The following year Servilius served the Republic in its military endeavours against the Volsci. Servilius served under the consular tribune Numerius Fabius Ambustus at Anxur, most likely as a legatus.

A few years later, in 402 BC, Servilius was elected for a third and final term as consular tribune. He shared the office with five others, Quintus Servilius Fidenas (a distant relative), Lucius Verginius Triocostus Esquilinus, Quintus Sulpicius Camerinus Cornutus, Aulus Manlius Vulso Capitolinus and Manius Sergius Fidenas. The year again saw strife within the consular college. This internal strife resulted in the defeat of Sergius at Veii by a combined force of the Veientanes and Faliscans when his colleague and political rival Verginius refused to help him. Servilius, in a similar fashion to his actions during 408 BC, went against his colleagues and, with the aid of the senate, forced the whole college (including himself) to abdicate in favour of a newly elected college of tribunes.

There is some confusion regarding the identity of the Gaius Servilius Ahala who served as magister equitum in 389 BC under the dictator Marcus Furius Camillus. This co-dictator could possibly be the elder Servilius being appointed for a second time to the role or potentially an otherwise unattested son or relative of his. The classicist Broughton favours the view that they are two different individuals.

== Cognomen ==
References to Servilius differ, as they do for several of his contemporaries among the consular tribunes, regarding his cognomen. Most sources agree on "Ahala" as his main identifying cognomen while a few, for example the Chronograph of 354, uses the cognomen "Structus". Thus Servilius could be named in three different ways: Gaius Servilius Ahala, Gaius Servilius Structus Ahala or Gaius Servilius Structus. The consensus favours either of the options containing "Ahala" with Broughton having him simply named as Gaius Servilius Ahala.

There is nothing on Gaius Servilius Ahala.

== See also ==
- Servilia gens – Ancient Roman family

Political offices
Preceded by Gnaeus Cornelius Cossus; Lucius Furius Medullinus	Consular tribune of the Roman Republic with Gaius Julius Iulus; Publius Cornelius Cossus; 408 BC	Succeeded by Lucius Furius Medullinus; Gaius Servilius Ahala; Gaius Valerius Potitus Volusus; Numerius Fabius Vibulanus
Preceded by Gaius Julius Iulus; Publius Cornelius Cossus; Gaius Servilius Ahala	Consular tribune of the Roman Republic with Lucius Furius Medullinus; Gaius Valerius Potitus Volusus; Numerius Fabius Vibulanus; 407 BC	Succeeded by Publius Cornelius Rutilus Cossus; Gnaeus Cornelius Cossus; Numerius Fabius Ambustus; Lucius Valerius Potitus
Preceded by Lucius Valerius Potitus, Marcus Quinctilius Varus; Lucius Iulius Iullus, Appius Claudius Crassus Inregillensis, Marcus Furius Fusus; Manius Aemilius Mamercinus	Consular tribune of the Roman Republic with Quintus Sulpicius Camerinus Cornutus; Quintus Servilius Fidenas; Aulus Manlius Vulso Capitolinus; Lucius Verginius Tricostus Esquilinus; Manius Sergius Fidenas; 402 BC	Succeeded by Gnaeus Cornelius Cossus, Marcus Furius Camillus; Lucius Valerius Potitus, Caeso Fabius Ambustus, Lucius Julius Iulus; Manius Aemilius Mamercinus
