= Gaius Valerius Potitus Volusus =

5th-century BC Roman consul and consular tribune

Gaius Valerius Potitus Volusus was a consul in 410 BC and consular tribune in 415, 407 and 404 BC of the Roman Republic.

Valerius belonged to the Valeria gens, one of the oldest and possibly the most influential and powerful patrician gens of the early Republic. The family had, according to legend, been among the first families to hold the consulship with Publius Valerius Poplicola as the first suffect consul in 509 BC. His father was named Lucius and depending on sources his grandfather was either named Volusus or Publius. If his grandfather was named Publius then Valerius' contemporary, the consul, Lucius Valerius Potitus, can be considered to be Valerius' brother. Whoever Valerius' father and grandfather were there is no record of them holding any offices. Gaius Valerius Potitus Volusus is thought to have been the father of Gaius Valerius Potitus, the consular tribune in 370 BC.

== Career ==
Valerius first held the imperium in 415 BC as one of four consular tribunes. His colleagues were Publius Cornelius Cossus, Numerius Fabius Vibulanus and Quintus Quinctius Cincinnatus. With the exception of Fabius, all the consular tribunes were newcomers to the imperium. The actions of the consular tribunes are little known but there was a proposal by the tribune of the plebs, Lucius Decius, to colonise Bolae which was vetoed by his colleagues.

In 410 BC, Valerius was elected to as consul together with Manius Aemilius Mamercinus. There was a war against the Aequi and the Volsci. In response to this the consuls sought a levy which was vetoed by the plebeian tribune Marcus Menenius. This and the resulting military losses by Rome, turned the populace and the other plebeian tribunes against Menenius resulting in his proposal of an agrarian law being denied. This drawback for the Romans was short-lived and the fortress of Arx Carventana was captured (or recaptured) by the Romans. One of the consuls, most likely Valerius, was granted an ovation for this victory.

Valerius was again elected as consular tribune in 407 BC, this time with Lucius Furius Medullinus, Gaius Servilius Ahala and his former colleague from 415 BC, Fabius. These consular tribunes had previous experience in these roles. Wars with the Aequi and Volsci continues. The fortress of Arx Carventana, which had been captured in 410 BC, was lost in 409 BC while in the same year the town of Verugo was captured. In 408 BC the Romans had been forced by events to elect a dictator. Although the consular tribunes of 407 BC were highly experienced commanders they could not stop the successes of the Volscians, resulting in the loss of Verugo.

Valerius held his third and final consular tribuneship in 404 BC. His colleagues were Manius Sergius Fidenas, Publius Cornelius Maluginensis, Gnaeus Cornelius Cossus, Caeso Fabius Ambustus and Spurius Nautius Rutilus. War continued with the Volsci and the Veii, with Artena being captured from the Volsci and the Siege of Veii, which had begun the previous year, continuing. There was also an expedition sent by the consular tribunes which founded a new colony, Velitrae.

== See also ==
- Valeria gens – Ancient Roman family

Political offices
Preceded by A. Sempronius; M. Papirius; Q. Fabius; Sp. Nautius	Roman consular tribune 415 BC; With: Publius Cornelius Cossus; Quintus Quinctius Cincinnatus; Numerius Fabius Vibulanus	Succeeded by Gn. Cornelius; L. Valerius; Q. Fabius; P. Postumius
Preceded by M. Papirius; Sp. Nautius	Roman consul 410 BC; With: Manius Aemilius Mamercinus	Succeeded by Gn. Cornelius; L. Furius
Preceded by G. Julius; P. Cornelius; G. Servilius	Roman consular tribune II; 407 BC; With: Lucius Furius Medullinus; Numerius Fabius Vibulanus; Gaius Servilius Ahala	Succeeded by P. Cornelius; Gn. Cornelius; N. Fabius; L. Valerius
Preceded by T. Quinctius; Q. Quinctius II; G. Julius II; A. Manlius; L. Furius II; Mn. Aemilius	Roman consular tribune III; 404 BC; With: Manius Sergius Fidenas; Publius Cornelius Maluginensis (consular tribune 404 BC); Gnaeus Cornelius Cossus II; Caeso Fabius Ambustus; Spurius Nautius Rutilus III	Succeeded by Mn. Aemilius II; L. Valerius III; Ap. Claudius; M. Quinctilius; L. Julius; M. Furius
