= Fidenas (cognomen) =

Fidenas is an ancient Roman cognomen. Notable people with this cognomen include:

- Lucius Sergius Fidenas, 5th century BC Roman politician
- Manius Sergius Fidenas (fl. 404 BC–402 BC), Roman consular tribune
- Quintus Servilius Fidenas (fl. 402 BC–386 BC), Roman politician
- Quintus Servilius Priscus Fidenas (prior to 463 BC–390 BC), Roman dictator
