= Spurius Postumius Albinus Regillensis =

Roman senator and general

Spurius Postumius Albinus Regillensis was a Roman politician, of patrician family, of the early 4th century BC. He was elected a military consular tribune in 394 BC, and carried on the war against the Aequians. He at first suffered a bloody defeat, after which rumours reached Rome that he had been killed and his forces destroyed near Tusculum. But the news of his defeat had been overstated, and Postumius and his men afterwards conquered the Aequian force, completely wiping them out.

== See also ==
- Postumia gens

Political offices
Preceded by Publius Cornelius Cossus, Lucius Furius Medullinus V, Publius Cornelius Scipio, Quintus Servilius Fidenas III, Caeso Fabius Ambustus III, and Marcus Valerius Lactucinus Maximus II as Consular Tribunes of the Roman Republic	Consular Tribune of the Roman Republic; 394 with Marcus Furius Camillus III, [Lucius Valerius Potitus Poplicola, Lucius Furius Medullinus VI, Gaius Aemilius Mamercinus, and Publius Cornelius Scipio II	Succeeded by Lucius Valerius Potitus Poplicola and Servius Cornelius Maluginensis as Consuls of the Roman Republic
