= Caeso Fabius Ambustus =

Late-5th/early-4th century BC Roman politician and soldier

Caeso Fabius Ambustus was a four-time consular tribune of the Roman Republic around the turn of the 5th and 4th centuries BC.

Caeso was quaestor in 409 BC, the first year the office was opened to the plebs, and three of his colleagues were plebeians. Caeso was consular tribune for the first time in 404, again in 401, a third time in 395, and a fourth time in 390.

Caeso was the son of Marcus Fabius Ambustus, the Pontifex Maximus, and brother to Numerius and Quintus. With his two brothers, Caeso was sent as ambassador to the Gauls, when the latter were besieging Clusium, and participated in an attack against the besieging Gauls. The Gauls demanded that the three should be surrendered to them for violating the law of nations. When the Roman Senate refused to give up the guilty parties, the Gauls marched against Rome, which they sacked after the battle of the Allia.

Many scholars believe the entire story of the events at Clusium to be fiction, as Clusium had no real reason to appeal to Rome for help, and the Gauls needed no real provocation to sack Rome. The story, it is hypothesized, exists to provide an explanation for an otherwise unmotivated attack on Rome, and to depict Rome as a bulwark of Italy against the Gauls.

He was the father of Marcus Fabius Ambustus.

== See also ==
- Ambustus, for other men with the same cognomen
- Fabius Ambustus, for other men who used the same combination of gens name and cognomen
- Fabia gens, for a comprehensive list of gens members

Political offices
Preceded by Titus Quinctius Capitolinus Barbatus, Aulus Manlius Vulso Capitolinus, Quintus Quinctius Cincinnatus II, Lucius Furius Medullinus II, Gaius Iulius Iullus II, Manius Aemilius Mamercinus	Consular Tribune of the Roman Republic; 404 BC with Gaius Valerius Potitus Volusus III, Gnaeus Cornelius Cossus II, Manius Sergius Fidenas, Publius Cornelius Maluginensis, Spirius Nautius Rutilus III	Succeeded by Manius Aemilius Mamercinus II, Marcus Quinctilius Varus, Lucius Valerius Potitus III, Lucius Iulius Iullus, Appius Claudius Crassus Inregillensis, Marcus Furius Fusus
Preceded by Gaius Servilius Ahala III, Quintus Sulpicius Camerinus Cornutus, Quintus Servilius Fidenas, Aulus Manlius Vulso Capitolinus II, Lucius Verginius Tricostus Esquilinus, Manius Sergius Fidenas II	Consular Tribune of the Roman Republic; 401 BC with Lucius Valerius Potitus IV, Gnaeus Cornelius Cossus III, Marcus Furius Camillus, Manius Aemilius Mamercinus III, Lucius Iulius Iullus	Succeeded by Publius Licinius Calvus Esquilinus, Publius Maelius Capitolinus, Publius Manlius Vulso, Spirius Furius Medullinus, Lucius Titinius Pansa Saccus, Lucius Publilius Philo Vulscus
Preceded by Lucius Titinius Pansa Saccus II, Quintus Manlius Vulso Capitolinus, Publius Licinius Calvus Esquilinus II, Gnaeus Genucius Augurinus II, Publius Maelius Capitolinus II, Lucius Atilius Priscus II	Consular Tribune of the Roman Republic; 395 BC with Publius Cornelius Cossus, Lucius Furius Medullinus V, Publius Cornelius Scipio, Quintus Servilius Fidenas III, Marcus Valerius Lactucinus Maximus II	Succeeded by Marcus Furius Camillus III, Lucius Valerius Potitus Poplicola, Lucius Furius Medullinus VI, Spirius Postumius Albinus Regillensis, Gaius Aemilius Mamercinus, Publius Cornelius Scipio II
Preceded by Lucius Lucretius Tricipitinus Flavus, Lucius Furius Medullinus VII, Servius Sulpicius Camerinus, Agrippa Furius Fusus, Lucius Aemilius Mamercinus, Gaius Aemilius Mamercinus II	Consular Tribune of the Roman Republic; 390 BC with Quintus Fabius Ambustus, Quintus Sulpicius Longus, Quintus Servilius Fidenas IV, Numerius Fabius Ambustus II, Publius Cornelius Maluginensis IV	Succeeded by Lucius Valerius Potitus Poplicola II, Aulus Manlius Capitolinus, Lucius Verginius Tricostus Esquilinus, Lucius Aemilius Mamercinus II, Lucius Postumius Albinus Regillensis, Publius Cornelius
