= Marcus Postumius Albinus Regillensis =

5th-century BC Roman politician and consular tribune

Marcus Postumius Albinus Regillensis was an ancient Roman politician belonging to the patrician Postumia gens. His father and grandfather were both named Aulus, possibly identifying his father or grandfather as Aulus Postumius Albus Regillensis, consul in 464 BC. Publius Postumius Albinus Regillensis, consular tribune in 414 BC, was most likely his brother. Postumius relationship to later Postumii Albini remains unknown as filiations are missing from the consular tribunes and consuls of 397, 394 and 334 BC.

== Career ==
In 426 BC Postumius was elected together with Titus Quinctius Poenus Cincinnatus, Gaius Furius Pacilus Fusus and Aulus Cornelius Cossus as consular tribune. The year saw war against the Veii and Fidenae which resulted in the appointment of a dictator, Mamercus Aemilius Mamercinus. Postumius and his colleague Quinctius served under the dictator, probably as legatus, while his other colleague Cornelius was appointed as magister equitum. The last colleague, Furius role during the events are unknown. The war ended with the defeat of both the Veii and the capture of Fidenae, resulting in a triumph celebrated by Aemilius.

In 403 BC Postumius was elected as censor together with Marcus Furius Camillus. During their censorship a tax was imposed upon all men who had remained single up until old age and on orphans.

He is listed by Livy as consular tribune in 403 BC, were the historian has included the two censors into the college of the consular tribunes. The consensus among modern scholars is that Livy (or the sources he relied on) has misidentified the censors as consular tribunes. Some scholars, such as Beloch, have argued that this might mean that they were in fact neither consular tribunes or censors, but instead military tribunes with censorial powers.

== See also ==
- Postumia gens
