= Timasitheus of Lipara =

4th-century BC Greek archon of the Aeolian Islands

Timasitheus (Ancient Greek: Τιμασίθεος) of Lipara (modern Lipari) was a Greek local archon of Magna Graecia who lived around 400 BC. He is mentioned by Roman era historians as a wise and pious person, who once helped a Roman embassy reach Delphi safely.

According to Roman historian Livy, after the Romans subdued Veii (396 BC), they sent a deputation of three senators to Apollo's holy city of Delphi, carrying a golden bowl as a gift to the god. But as the Roman ship was approaching the Strait of Sicily, it was captured by pirates and taken to the islands of Liparae (Aeolian Islands), where "piracy was regarded as a kind of state institution, and it was the custom for the government to distribute the plunder thus acquired". That year's supreme leader was Timasitheus; upon hearing of the nationality of the travellers and the reason of their trip, he persuaded his fellow countrymen to release the captives, return the plunder and escort the Roman ship as far Greece, in order to protect it from other pirates.

Diodorus Siculus adds that when the Romans conquered Lipari 137 years later, they relieved Timasitheus's descendants of the duty to pay taxes.
