= Lake Albano =

Volcanic crater lake in Italy

- Lago Albano (Italian)
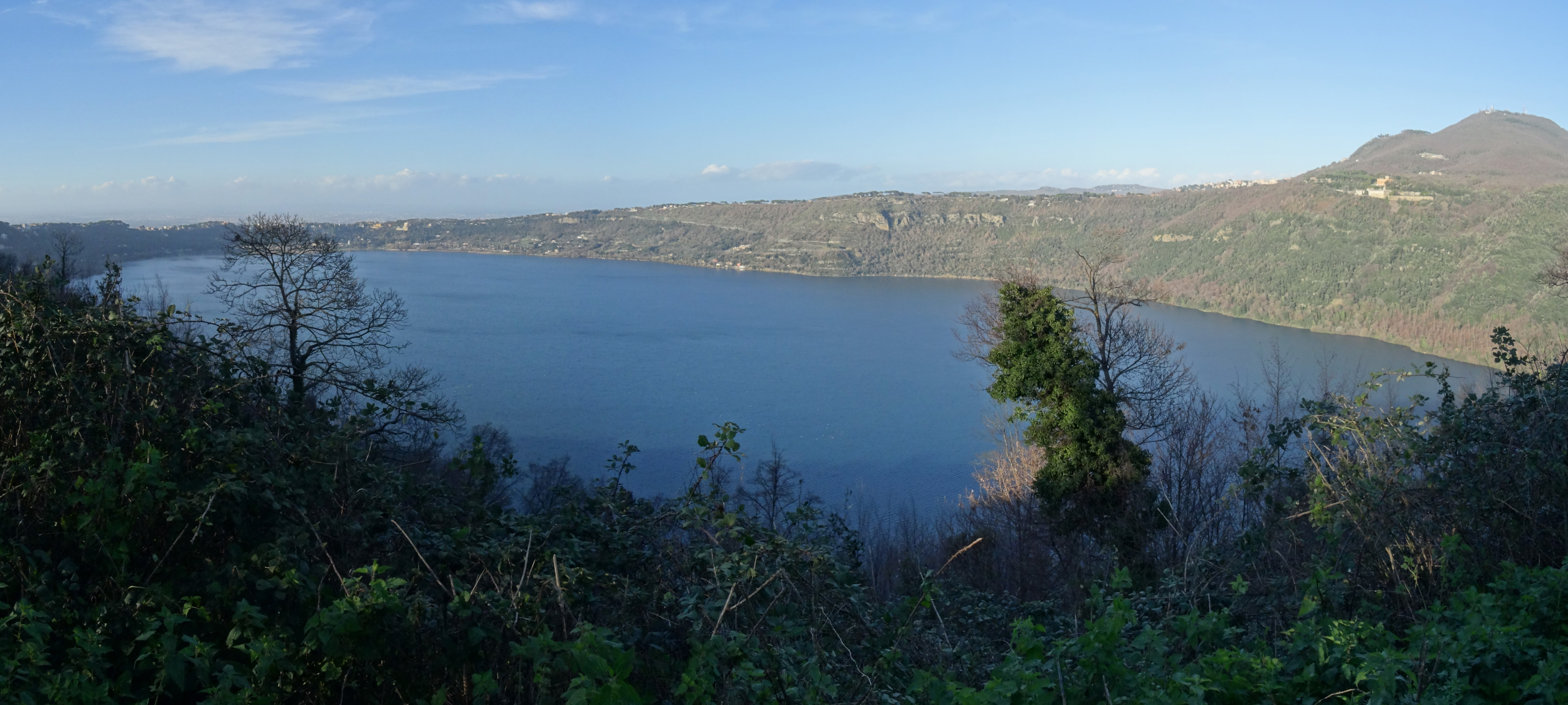
- The lake

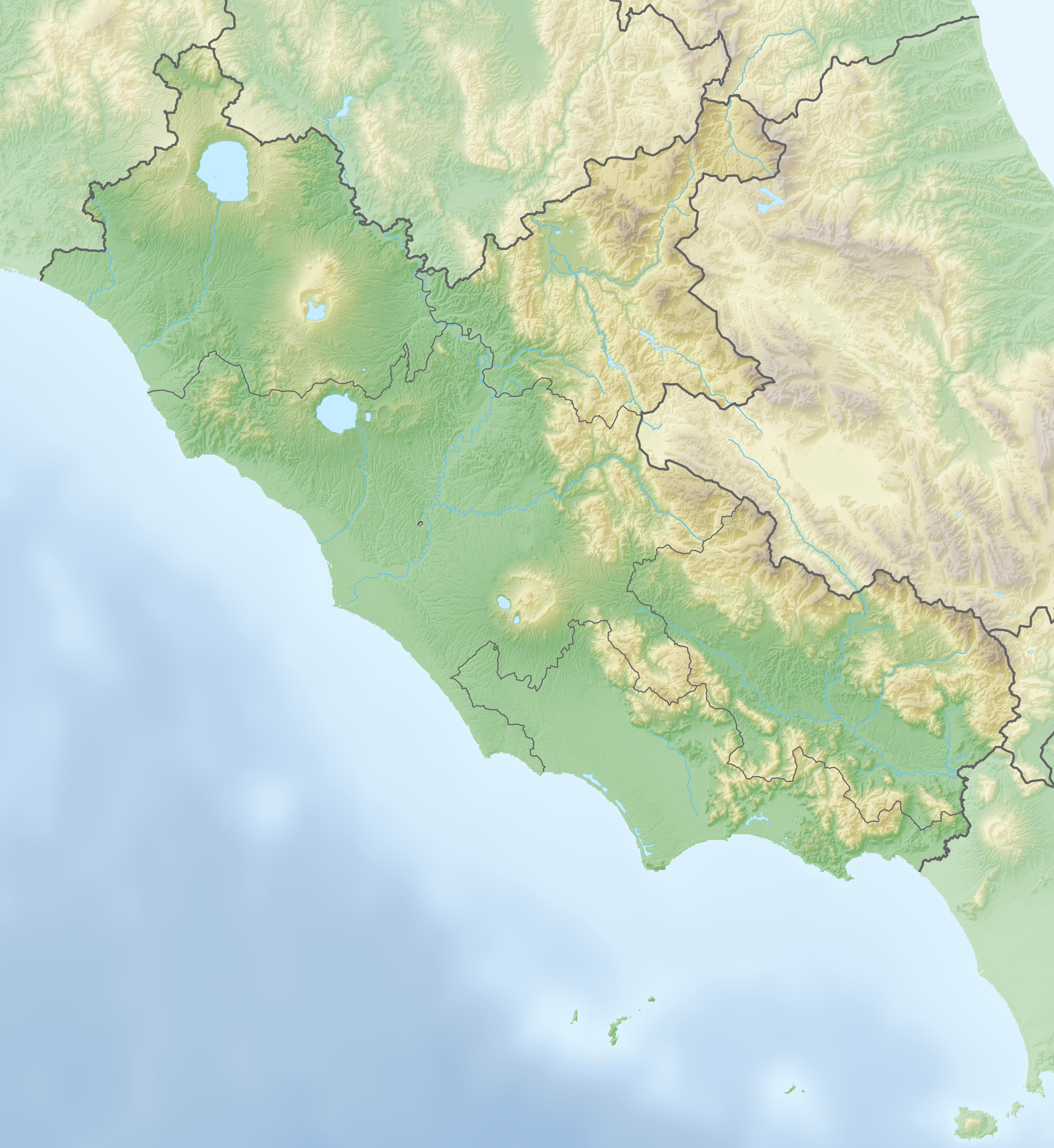
- Location within Lazio
- Location: Alban Hills
- Coordinates: 41°45′0″N 12°39′54″E
- Type: crater lake
- Basin countries: Italy
- Surface area: 6 km^{2} (2.3 sq mi)
- Max. depth: 170 m (560 ft)

Lake Albano (Italian: Lago Albano or Lago di Castel Gandolfo) is a small volcanic crater lake in the Alban Hills of Lazio, at the foot of Monte Cavo, 20 km (12 mi) southeast of Rome. Castel Gandolfo, overlooking the lake, is the site of the Papal Palace of Castel Gandolfo.

It hosted the canoeing and rowing events of the 1960 Summer Olympic Games that were held in Rome. The lane marking system developed for these events is commonly referred to as the Albano buoy system.

== History and geology ==
In Roman times, it was known as Albanus Lacus and lay not far from the ancient city of Alba Longa.

With a depth of about 170 m (560 ft), Lake Albano is the deepest in Lazio. The lake is 3.5 km (2.2 mi) long by 2.3 km (1.4 mi) wide, and was formed by the overlapping union of two volcanic craters, an origin indicated by the ridge in its center, which rises to a height of 70 m (230 ft). Plutarch reports that in 406 BC the lake surged over the surrounding hills, despite there being no rain nor tributaries flowing into the lake to account for the rise in water level. The ensuing flood destroyed fields and vineyards before eventually pouring into the sea. It is thought to have been a limnic eruption caused by volcanic gases, trapped in sediment at the bottom of the lake and gradually building up until suddenly releasing, causing the water to overflow.

=== Drainage tunnel ===
Around 395 BC, during the wars between Rome and Veii, a discharge tunnel was built crossing the crater walls. It served as an emissary to control flooding of the lake, and was a gigantic work given the modest means of the time. It is said that it was built by 30,000 men.

The tunnel is 1350 m long, 1.20 m wide and 2 m high. Five vertical access shafts are known and it runs 128 m below the surface. The exit was originally 13 m below the level of the lake, but today it is higher due to the lowering of the level. It begins about 500 m beyond the nymphaeum of Bergantino, and comes out on the other side in the Mole di Castel Gandolfo locality, where the water flow drove multiple watermills.

According to Titus Livius, this feat of engineering was incited by the Oracle of Delphi: the Roman victory against Veii would be possible only when the lake waters were channeled and used for irrigation.

== Lake Albanus in Roman myth ==
During Rome's war with Veii in 393 BC, the level of Lake Albano rose to an unusual height even in the absence of rain. This prodigy was believed to be relevant to the siege of Veii because a haruspex from Veii recited some lines of a prophecy that illustrated the relationship between the level of its waters and either the safety or the fall of the town to the Romans. It foretold that as long as the waters of the lake remained high, Veii would be impregnable to the Romans. If the waters of the lake were scattered in an inland direction, Veii would fall; but if they were to overflow through the usual streams or channels toward the sea, this would be unfavourable to the Romans as well.

Dumézil ascribed this story to the Roman custom of projecting religious legendary heritage onto history, considering it to be a festival myth aimed at giving relevance to an exceptional event which would have happened during the Neptunalia. This legend showed the scope of the powers hidden in waters and the religious importance of their control by man: Veientans too knowing the fact had been digging channels for a long time as recent archaeological finds confirm. There is a temporal coincidence between the conjuration of the prodigy and the works of derivation recommended by Palladius and Columella at the time of the canicula, when the waters are at their lowest.

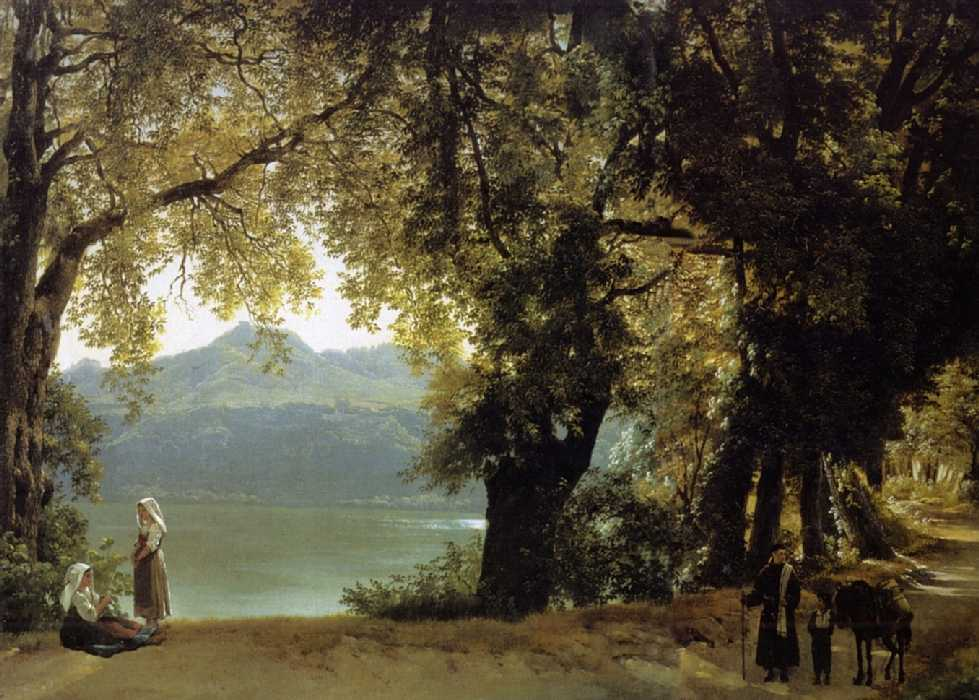
Painting by Sylvester Shchedrin, before 1825

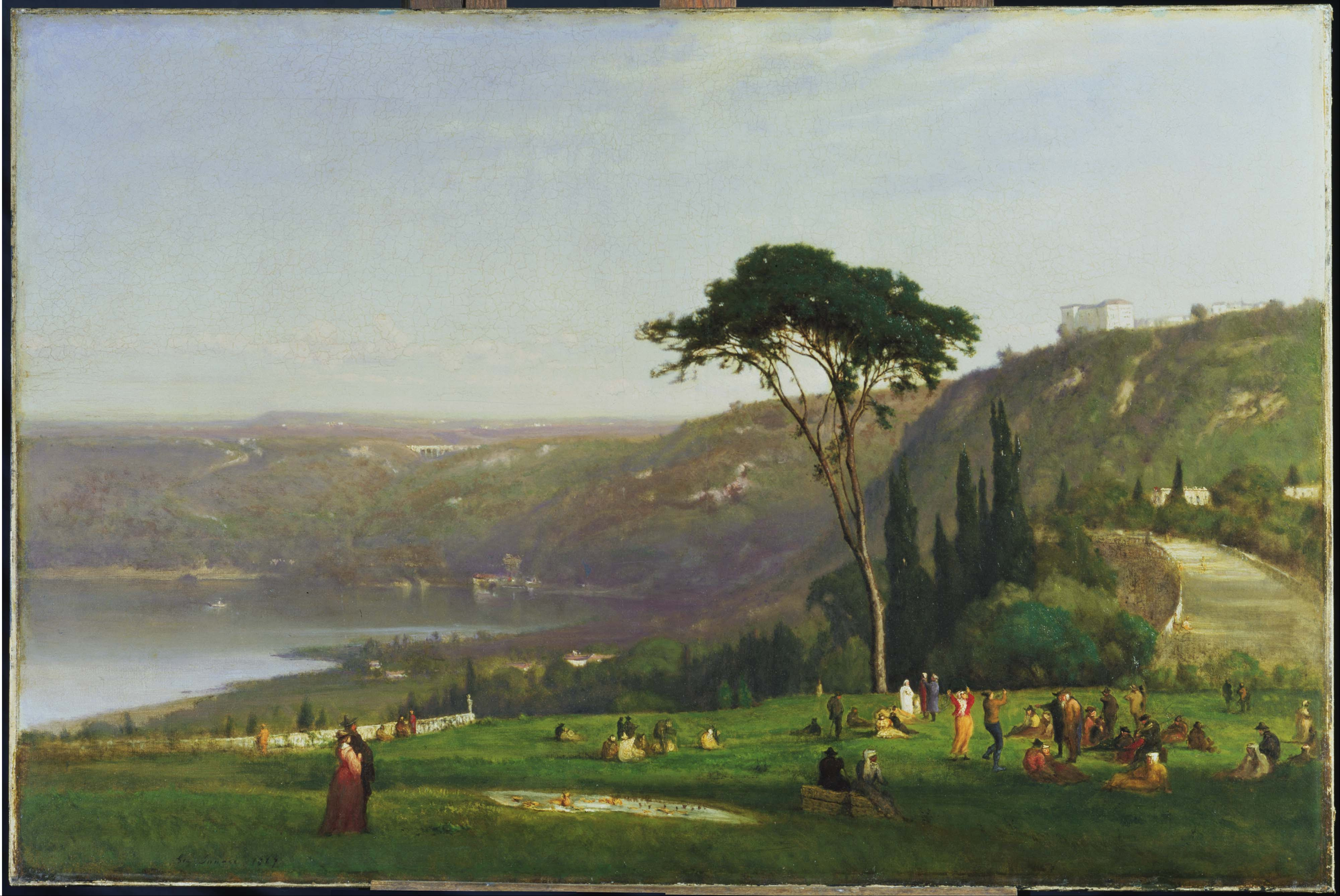
Lake Albano, George Inness, 1869

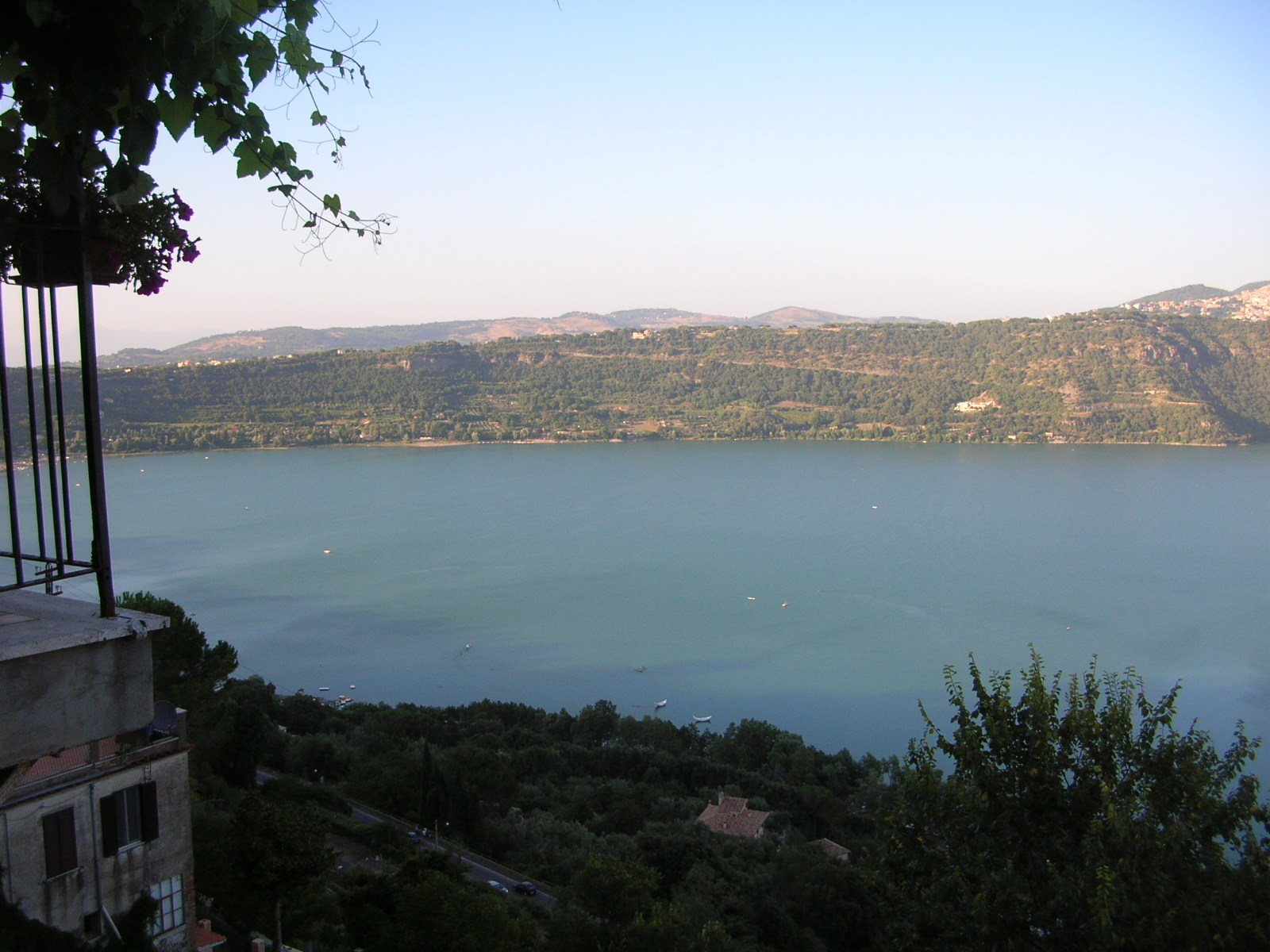
Panoramic view

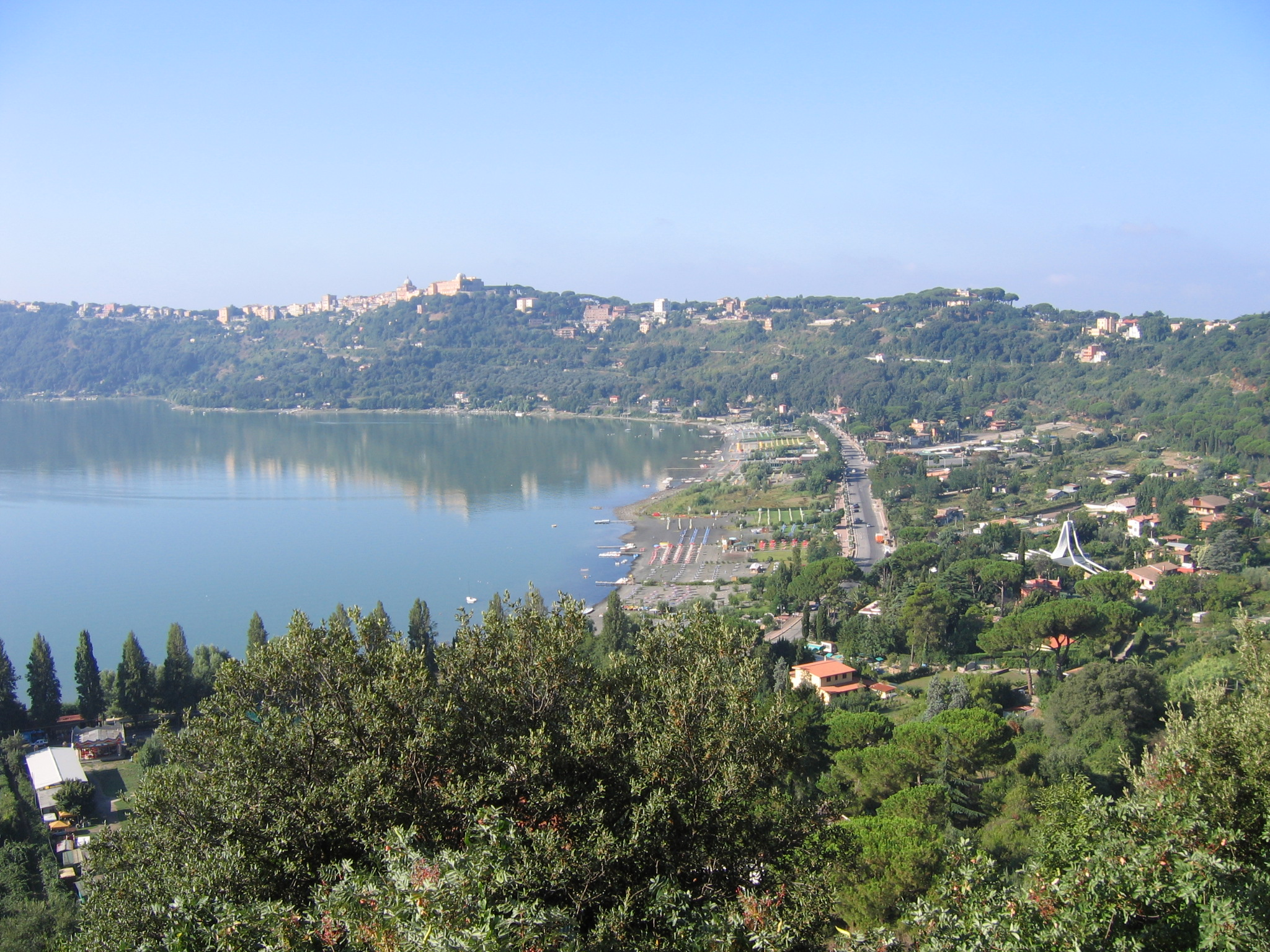
View of the lake showing Castel Gandolfo

== See also ==
- Historic centre of Albano Laziale

== Bibliography ==
- Britannica.com (retrieved: 12 March 2009)
- Italian Tourism – Lakes (retrieved: 12 March 2009)
- The Columbia Encyclopedia, Sixth Edition | Date: 2008 | The Columbia Encyclopedia, Sixth Edition, Columbia University Press (retrieved: 12 March 2009)
