= Aulus Postumius Albinus Regillensis =

Early 4th century BC Roman politician

- Occupation: Politician

Aulus Postumius Albinus Regillensis was a Roman politician, of patrician family, in the early 4th century BC. He was appointed consular tribune in 397 BC, and collected with his colleague Lucius Julius Iullus an army of volunteers, since the tribunes prevented them from making a regular levy, and cut off a body of Tarquinienses, who were returning home after plundering the Roman territory.

== See also ==
- Postumia gens

Political offices
Preceded by Lucius Valerius Potitus V Lucius Furius Medullinus III; Marcus Valerius Lactucinus Maximus; Quintus Servilius Fidenas II; Marcus Furius Camillus; Quintus Sulpicius Camerinus Cornutus II	Consular Tribune of the Roman Republic with Lucius Iulius Iullus II; Lucius Furius Medullinus IV; Publius Cornelius Maluginensis; Lucius Sergius Fidenas; Aulus Manlius Vulso Capitolinus III; 397 BC	Succeeded by Lucius Titinius Pansa Saccus II; Quintus Manlius Vulso Capitolinus; Publius Licinius Calvus Esquilinus II; Gnaeus Genucius Augurinus II; Publius Maelius Capitolinus II; Lucius Atilius Priscus II
