= Lucius Furius Medullinus (consular tribune 407 BC) =

Roman politician and soldier (c.445–c.375 BC)

Lucius Furius Medullinus (c. 445 BC – c. 375 BC), of the patrician gens Furia, was a politician and general of the Roman Republic who was consul twice and Consular Tribune seven times.

== First two consulships ==
Medullinus was elected consul for the first time in 413 BC, together with Aulus Cornelius Cossus, although both Diodorus Siculus and Cassiodorus name his colleague as Marcus Cornelius Cossus. Medullinus headed the investigation (quaestio) into a mutiny that had occurred during the previous year, which had resulted in the death of the consular tribune Publius Postumius Albinus Regillensis. Passing judgement, the consuls found a few soldiers guilty, who were then forced into committing suicide.

Medullinus was then given command of the campaign against the Volsci, who had raided the territory of the Hernici, a people who were allied with the Roman Republic. He was unable to bring the Volsci to battle however, as they decided to withdraw back into their territory. Medullinus subsequently occupied the town of Ferentino; the town together with the surrounding territory was then handed over to the Hernici.

Medullinus’ second consulship came in 409 BC, where he was elected alongside Gnaeus Cornelius Cossus. During his consulship, due to the intervention of three Plebeian tribunes from the Icilius family, for the first time in the history of the Republic, three quaestors of plebeian extraction were elected. Strengthened by this success, the tribunes next opposed the raising of levies necessary to meet the raids of the Aequi and Volsci within the territory of the allied Latins and Hernici tribes, hoping thereby to obtain other concessions for the plebeians. Eventually it was agreed that in the following year (408 BC) consular tribunes would be elected; however, the Senate declared that it would accept no consular candidate who had been plebeian tribune that year, nor could any plebeian tribune be re-elected for the following year, thereby ensuring that no representative of the Icilius family could participate in those elections.

Having finally recruited an army, the consuls moved towards Arx Carventana, which had been conquered by the Aequi and the Volsci, but they were unable to recapture the town. Instead, they captured the town of Verrugo in Volscian territory.

== First two consular tribunates ==
In 407 BC, Medullinus was elected Consular Tribune, alongside Numerius Fabius Vibulanus, Gaius Valerius Potitus Volusus, and Gaius Servilius Ahala, all of his colleagues being consular tribunes for the second time.

With the expiration of the truce with the Veii, Rome sent a delegation to obtain redress for the damages and injuries which had been inflicted:

Arriving at the frontier, these men were met by an embassy of the Veientes, who asked them not to proceed to Veii until they themselves should have gone before the Roman senate. The senate, considering that the Veientes were in the throes of civil discord, agreed not to demand a settlement of them; so far were they from taking advantage of another people's difficulties.

The Romans, however, because they were unable to make a decision in time, lost the garrison at Verrugo, which was massacred by the Aequi and Volsci. A relieving force arrived after the massacre; unable to help their fallen comrades, they surprised the enemy, killing them as they were engaged in plundering Verrugo.

In 405 BC, Medullinus was elected Consular Tribune for the second time, alongside Titus Quinctius Capitolinus Barbatus, Aulus Manlius Vulso Capitolinus, Quintus Quinctius Cincinnatus, Gaius Julius Iulus and Manius Aemilius Mamercinus.

Rome took the war to Veii, with Medullinus and his colleagues besieging the city, which was unable to convince the other Etruscan cities to go to war against Rome:

Shortly after this siege began, the Etruscans held a numerously attended council at the shrine of Voltumna, but could reach no decision as to whether the entire nation should go to war in defence of the Veientes.

== Third to fifth consular tribunates ==
In 398 BC, Medullinus was elected Consular Tribune for the third time, alongside Lucius Valerius Potitus, Marcus Valerius Lactucinus Maximus, Quintus Servilius Fidenas, his famed brother, Marcus Furius Camillus and Quintus Sulpicius Camerinus Cornutus.

Medullinus and some of his colleagues continued with the siege of Veii, while Valerius Potitus and Medullinus' brother Furius Camillus sacked the towns of Falerii and Capena, which were allied with the Etruscans. During this year there was also the unusual rise of the waters of Lake Albano, and to interpret the meaning of which some ambassadors were sent to question the Oracle at Delphi, even though an old prophet from Veii had let slip the following prediction:

that whenever the water of the Alban Lake overflowed and the Romans drew it off in the appointed way, the victory over the Veientines would be granted them; until that happened the gods would not desert the walls of Veii. Then he explained the prescribed mode of drawing off the water.

In the following year (397 BC), Medullinus was elected Consular Tribune for the fourth time, alongside Lucius Julius Iulus, Aulus Postumius Albinus Regillensis, Publius Cornelius Maluginensis, Lucius Sergius Fidenas and Aulus Manlius Vulso Capitolinus.

This year saw Medullinus and his colleagues continue the siege of Veii, while at the same time having to endure an attack by the Volsci on the garrison at Anxur, as well as an attack by the Aequi on the colony of Labico. Into this already difficult military situation, the Romans were further placed under pressure by raids from Tarquinii, who tried to take advantage of the situation, confident that the Romans would be unable to launch any reprisals. Instead, a force was raised by Postumius Aulus and Lucius Julius, who surprised the raiders at Caere, and proceeded to annex the town from the Etruscans.

The ambassadors which had been sent to question the Oracle at Delphi returned with the following response:

See to it, Roman, that the rising flood
At Alba flow not o'er its banks and shape
Its channel seawards. Harmless through thy fields
Shalt thou disperse it, scattered into rills.
Then fiercely press upon thy foeman's walls,
For now the Fates have given thee victory.
That city which long years thou hast besieged
Shall now be thine. And when the war hath end,
Do thou, the victor, bear an ample gift
Into my temple, and the ancestral rites
Now in disuse, see that thou celebrate
Anew with all their wonted pomp.

Due to faulty elections, it was decided that the necessary act to restore the neglected rites involved the abdication of all the consular tribunes from their office for the remainder of their term, which was followed by three interregna before the election of new consular tribunes.

In 395 BC, Medullinus was elected Consular Tribune for the fifth time, alongside Publius Cornelius Cossus, Publius Cornelius Scipio, Quintus Servilius Fidenas, Caeso Fabius Ambustus and Marcus Valerius Lactucinus Maximus.

It is assumed that Medullinus remained at Rome, where he and some of his colleagues continued to manage internal affairs. Meanwhile, two brothers, Cornelius Maluginensis and Cornelius Scipio, were entrusted with the campaign against the Falisci, which did not produce any concrete results, while Valerius Lactucinus and Quintus Servilius were allotted the campaign against the town of Capena, which was ultimately forced to sue for peace with Rome. In Rome itself, however, disputes over the division of spoils taken in the fall of Veii from the year before continued to rage, when another controversy was ignited, arising from the proposal of the Plebeian tribune Titus Sicinius to transfer part of the Roman population to Veii, to which the Roman senate strenuously objected.

== Final two consular tribunates ==
In 394 BC, Medullinus was again elected Consular Tribune, this for the sixth time, alongside Marcus Furius Camillus, Lucius Valerius Potitus Poplicola, Spurius Postumius Albinus Regillensis, Gaius Aemilius Mamercinus and Publius Cornelius Scipio.

With Medullinus continuing to hold the fort at Rome, Furius Camillus was entrusted with the campaign against the Falisci, which ended with the surrender of Falerii to Rome. To Gaius Aemilius and Spurius Postumius was entrusted the campaign against the Aequi. The two consular tribunes, after defeating the enemy in open battle, decided that while Gaius Aemilius would remain to govern Verrugo, Spurius Postumius would plunder the lands of the Aequi. However, while plundering, the Roman forces were surprised and routed by the Aequi.

Despite the defeat, and despite many soldiers being stationed in Verrugo, the defeated Roman forces had fled to Tusculum, fearing a further attack by the Aequi. Postumius, however, managed to reorganize the army, and won a pitched battle against the Aequi.

Then in 391 BC, Medullinus was elected Consular Tribune for the seventh and final time, alongside Lucius Lucretius Tricipitinus Flavus, Servius Sulpicius Camerinus, Agrippa Furius Fusus, Lucius Aemilius Mamercinus and Gaius Aemilius Mamercinus.

While Medullinus presumably again managed affairs in Rome, Lucius Lucretius and Gaius Aemilius were entrusted the campaign against Volsci, while Agrippa Furius and Servius Sulpicius were given command of the war against the Salpinates. However, both campaigns were discontinued due to an outbreak of pestilence that had hit Rome.

The Romans had easily had the upper hand against the Volsci during the first and only pitched battle, and began to raid their territory, until the Volsci were granted a twenty-year truce in exchange for compensating the Romans for all territory which had been raided and destroyed during the previous year, as well as paying the expenses of the Roman soldiers that year. The Salpinates, having heard of the defeat of the allies, retreated into their strongholds, leaving its territory defenseless to Roman raids.

It was during Medullinus’ consular tribunate that Marcus Furius Camillus, accused by the Plebeian tribune Lucius Apuleius of unfairly distributing the spoils of war obtained after the fall of Veii, decided to go into voluntary exile to Ardea. Meanwhile, the Gauls, led by Brennus, began besieging Chiusi, which sent ambassadors to Rome to ask for help.

== Sources ==
=== Ancient ===
- Livy, "Ab Urbe Condita", Books IV and V

=== Modern ===
- Broughton, T. Robert S., The Magistrates of the Roman Republic, Vol I (1951)

Political offices
Preceded by Cn. Cornelius Cossus, Q. Fabius Vibulanus Ambustus, L. Valerius Potitus, and P. Postumius Albinus Regillensis; Consular Tribunes	Consul of the Roman Republic with A. Cornelius Cossus; 413 BC	Succeeded by Q. Fabius Vibulanus Ambustus; C. Furius Pacilus
Preceded by M'. Aemilius Mamercinus; C. Valerius Potitus Volusus	Consul of the Roman Republic with Cn. Cornelius Cossus; 409 BC	Succeeded by C. Julius Iulus, C. Servilius Ahala, and P. Cornelius Cossus; Consular Tribunes
Preceded by C. Julius Iulus, C. Servilius Ahala, and P. Cornelius Cossus	Consular Tribune of the Roman Republic with N. Fabius Vibulanus, C. Valerius Potitus Volusus, and C. Servilius Ahala; 407 BC	Succeeded by P. Cornelius Rutilus Cossus, N. Fabius Ambustus, Cn. Cornelius Cossus, and L. Valerius Potitus
Preceded by P. Cornelius Rutilus Cossus, N. Fabius Ambustus, Cn. Cornelius Cossus, and L. Valerius Potitus	Consular Tribune of the Roman Republic with T. Quinctius Capitolinus Barbatus, A. Manlius Vulso Capitolinus, Q. Quinctius Cincinnatus II, C. Julius Iulus and M'. Aemilius Mamercinus; 405 BC	Succeeded by C. Valerius Potitus Volusus, Cn. Cornelius Cossus, M'. Sergius Fidenas, K. Fabius Ambustus, P. Cornelius Maluginensis, and Sp. Nautius Rutilus
Preceded by Gn. Genucius Augurinus, C. Duillius Longus, L. Atilius Priscus, M. Veturius Crassus Cicurinus, M. Pomponius Rufus, and Volero Publilius Philo	Consular Tribune of the Roman Republic with L. Valerius Potitus, M. Valerius Lactucinus Maximus, Q. Servilius Fidenas, M. Furius Camillus, and Q. Sulpicius Camerinus Cornutus; 398 BC	Succeeded by L. Julius Iulus, A. Postumius Albinus Regillensis, P. Cornelius Maluginensis, L. Sergius Fidenas, and A. Manlius Vulso Capitolinus
Preceded by L. Valerius Potitus, M. Valerius Lactucinus Maximus, Q. Servilius Fidenas, M. Furius Camillus, and Q. Sulpicius Camerinus Cornutus	Consular Tribune of the Roman Republic with L. Julius Iulus, A. Postumius Albinus Regillensis, P. Cornelius Maluginensis, L. Sergius Fidenas, and A. Manlius Vulso Capitolinus; 397 BC	Succeeded by L. Titinius Pansa Saccus, Q. Manlius Vulso Capitolinus, P. Licinius Calvus Esquilinus, Cn. Genucius Augurinus, P. Maelius Capitolinus, L. Atilius Priscus II
Preceded by L. Titinius Pansa Saccus, Q. Manlius Vulso Capitolinus, P. Licinius Calvus Esquilinus, Cn. Genucius Augurinus, P. Maelius Capitolinus, L. Atilius Priscus	Consular Tribune of the Roman Republic with P. Cornelius Cossus, P. Cornelius Scipio, Q. Servilius Fidenas, K. Fabius Ambustus III, and M. Valerius Lactucinus Maximus; 395 BC	Succeeded by M. Furius Camillus, L. Valerius Potitus Poplicola, L. Furius Medullinus, Sp. Postumius Albinus Regillensis, C. Aemilius Mamercinus, and P. Cornelius Scipio
Preceded by P. Cornelius Cossus, P. Cornelius Scipio II, Q. Servilius Fidenas, K. Fabius Ambustus III, and M. Valerius Lactucinus Maximus	Consular Tribune of the Roman Republic with M. Furius Camillus, L. Valerius Potitus Poplicola, Sp. Postumius Albinus Regillensis, C. Aemilius Mamercinus, and P. Cornelius Scipio; 394 BC	Succeeded by L. Valerius Potitus Poplicola; Ser. Cornelius Maluginensis
Preceded by L. Valerius Potitus Poplicola; M. Manlius Capitolinus	Consular Tribune of the Roman Republic with L. Lucretius Tricipitinus Flavus, Ser. Sulpicius Camerinus, Agr. Furius Fusus, L. Aemilius Mamercinus, and C. Aemilius Mamercinus; 391 BC	Succeeded by Q. Fabius Ambustus, Q. Sulpicius Longus, K. Fabius Ambustus IV, Q. Servilius Fidenas, N. Fabius Ambustus II, and P. Cornelius Maluginensis
