= Gnaeus Cornelius Cossus =

Gnaeus Cornelius Cossus may refer to:

- Gnaeus Cornelius Cossus (consul 409 BC), consular tribune in 415 and consul in 409 BC
- Gnaeus Cornelius Cossus (consular tribune 406 BC), consular tribune in 406, 404, and 401 BC

== See also ==
- Gnaeus Cornelius (disambiguation)
