= Artena =

- Comune
- Comune di Artena
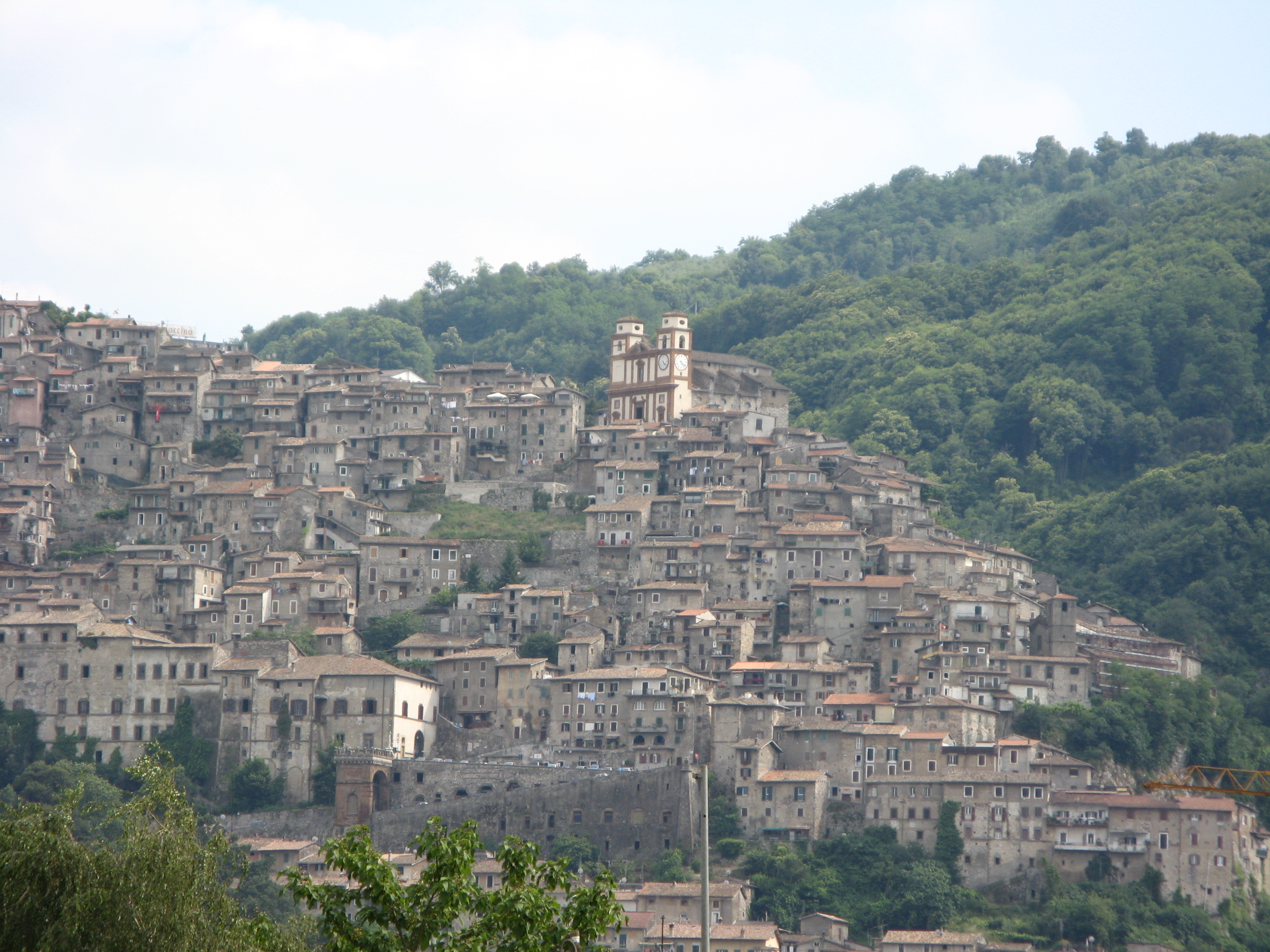
- View of Artena

- Coat of arms

- Location of Artena in Italy Artena (Lazio)
- Coordinates: 41°44′N 12°55′E
- Country: Italy
- Region: Lazio
- Metropolitan city: Rome (RM)
- Frazioni: Macere, Colubro, Maiotini, Abbazia, Selvatico, Valli

Government
  - Mayor: Felicetto Angelini

Area
  - Total: 54.8 km^{2} (21.2 sq mi)
- Elevation: 420 m (1,380 ft)

Population (31 August 2021)
  - Total: 13,592
  - Density: 248/km^{2} (642/sq mi)
- Demonym: Artenesi
- Time zone: UTC+1 (CET)
  - Summer (DST): UTC+2 (CEST)
- Postal code: 00031
- Dialing code: 06
- Patron saint: Mary Magdalene
- Saint day: 22 July
- Website: www.comune.artena.rm.it/hh/index.php

Artena is a town and comune in the Metropolitan City of Rome, Italy. It is situated in the northwest of Monti Lepini, in the upper valley of the Sacco River. It is approximately 40 kilometres (25 mi) southeast by rail, and 30 kilometres (19 mi) direct from Rome.

The economy is based on agriculture, animal husbandry and tourism.

== History ==
The name of the original village of the Volsci is uncertain; Ecetra or Fortinum are possible suggestions.

The modern village was called Monte Fortino until 1873. It owes its present name to an unproven identification of the site with the ancient Volscian Artena, destroyed in 404 BC. Another Artena, which was an Etruscan town belonging to the district of Caere, and laying between it and Veii, was destroyed in the period of the kings, and its site is unknown.

In the Middle Ages Artena was a fief of the Counts of Tusculum and then the Counts of Segni, who held its castle until 1475 when, after the request of Charles VIII of France, it was assigned to the Colonna. Due to the latter's anti-papal stance, Artena was ravaged several times by papal armies (1526, 1543 and 1557).

== Main sights ==
On the mountain 600 metres (2,000 ft) above the village are the fine remains of the fortifications of a city built in the 6th or 5th century BC, in cyclopean blocks of local limestone. Within the walls are traces of buildings, and a massive terrace which supported some edifice of importance. This terraced settlement (Piano della Cività) later was the site of a Roman villa.

Other sights include the Palazzo Borghese (17th century), and the churches of Santa Maria delle Letizie, Santa Croce, Santo Stefano Protomartire and San Francesco.

== Twin towns ==
- Alcalá del Río, Spain
