= Lucius Titinius Pansa Saccus =

Roman politician in the 5th and 4th centuries BC

Lucius Titinius Pansa Saccus was a Roman politician in the fifth and fourth centuries BC.

== Career ==
In 400 BC, Titinius was elected consular tribune. His colleagues were Publius Licinius Calvus Esquilinus, Publius Manlius Vulso, Publius Maelius Capitolinus, Spurius Furius Medullinus, and Lucius Publius Philo Vulscus. In that year the Romans conquered the town of Anxur again.

In 396 BC he was elected again. With him were Publius Licinius Calvus Esquilinus, Publius Maelius Capitolinus, Quintus Manlius Vulso Capitolinus, Gnaeus Genucius Augurinus and Lucius Atilius Priscus as consular tribunes. Titinius and Genucius led the soldiers into the Falisci and the Capenates. Genucius fought bravely by the front lines and fell in the fighting. Titinius held his position on a hill for the duration of the battle. The news of the defeat spread from Rome to Veii.
