= Quintus Servilius Fidenas =

4th-century BC Roman politician and consular tribune

Quintus Servilius Fidenas was a prominent early Roman politician who achieved the position of Consular tribune six times throughout a sixteen-year period. Quintus Servilius was a member of the illustrious gens Servilia, a patrician family which had achieved great prominence since the foundation of the republic. In particular, Servilius was the son of Quintus Servilius Priscus Fidenas, a well respected statesman and general who served as dictator twice, in 435 and 418 BC, as well as holding the religious title of either augur or pontifex, which he held until his death in 390 BC. Servilius the younger himself had at least one son, also named Quintus Servilius Fidenas, who served as consular tribune in 382, 378, and 369 BC.

== Early career ==
In 402 BC, Servilius was elected to his first consular tribuneship, in the midst of the war against Veii. His peers in the office for this year were Lucius Verginius Tricostus Esquilinus, Gaius Servilius Ahala, Quintus Sulpicius Camerinus Cornutus, Aulus Manlius Vulso Capitolinus and Manius Sergius Fidenas. In this year, the siege of Veii was continued, and the Faliscans and the Capinates, fearful of a future Roman invasion of their lands, joined the war on the side of the Veii. Together, the Faliscans and the besieged men of Veii attacked the camp of the tribune Manius Sergius, which soon collapsed due to the onslaught of two armies attacking at the same time. Another tribune, Lucius Verginius, was in a position to aid Sergius and his troops but neglected to, as the result of a personal rivalry between Verginius and Sergius. After the defeat, there was much debate in the senate over who was to blame for the disaster, before the tribune Gaius Servilius Ahala proposed that the entire college of military tribunes resign and a new batch elected, a proposal which was accepted and then conducted. While Quintus Servilius likely played a role in these events, precisely what role he played is unrecorded and therefore unknown.

In 398 BC, Servilius was again elected consular tribune, this time alongside Lucius Valerius Potitus, Marcus Valerius Lactucinus Maximus, Marcus Furius Camillus, Lucius Furius Medullinus, and Quintus Sulpicius Camerinus Cornutus. In this year, the siege of Veii continued on from previous years, with all the tribunes carrying on the siege except Camillus and Potitus, who led campaigns against the Veinete allied cities of Capena and Falerii respectively.

== Middle career ==
In 395 BC, Servilius was chosen consular tribune for a third time, serving alongside Publius Cornelius Cossus, Publius Cornelius Scipio, Lucius Furius Medullinus, Caeso Fabius Ambustus, and Marcus Valerius Lactucinus Maximus. In the previous year Camillus, former colleague of Servilius, serving as dictator finally took Veii once and for all, freeing up the tribunes to focus their attentions on the allies of the now ravaged city of Veii. For the purpose of attacking the allies of Veii, the senate assigned the two Cornelii to attack Falerii, and Marcus Valerius and Servilius to defeat Capena. Servilius and Valerius ravaged the Capenate territory until the Capenates, exhausted of war, requested peace, a request which was granted by the Romans. The Cornelii attempted the same, but were less successful in their endeavor, and thus the war with Falerii continued into the next year.

Five years later, in 390 BC, Servilius was once again made consular tribune, with Quintus Fabius Ambustus, Caeso Fabius Ambustus, Numerius Fabius Ambustus, Quintus Sulpicius Longus and Publius Cornelius Maluginensis as his colleagues. In this year a roving band of marauding Gauls, led by their king Brennus, moved on Rome just after sacking Clusium. The Roman's met the army of Brennus on the field, but their force was completely destroyed, setting the stage for the Sack of Rome which would damage much of the city as well as the pride of Rome, and kill many old Roman patricians, including possibly Servilius' father himself, who reportedly died this year.

== Later career ==
In 388 BC, Servilius was elected consular tribune for a fifth time, alongside Titus Quinctius Cincinnatus Capitolinus, Lucius Julius Iulus, Lucius Aquillius Corvus, Lucius Lucretius Tricipitinus Flavus, and Servius Sulpicius Rufus. In this year, there were two wars conducted, one against the Aequians and the other against Tarquinii, however it is not recorded which tribunes led which campaign.

In 386 BC, Servilius served in one final term as consular tribune, this time with Camillus, who had since saved Rome from the Gauls and thus became its most respected statesman, Servius Cornelius Maluginensis, Lucius Quinctius Cincinnatus, Lucius Horatius Pulvillus, and Publius Valerius Potitus. The other tribunes, including Servilius, in awe and respect of Camillus, resigned their independent authority to him, effectively making him dictator in all but name. In this year there was a war with Antium, which was assigned to be conducted by Camillus, who would be assisted by Publius Valerius. Camillus then appointed the other tribunes to commit to tasks that would aid the war effort or maintain the welfare of the state, and for this purpose, he assigned to Servilius command over a second reserve army just outside of Rome. After this year, Servilius is not mentioned again in our sources.
