= Lucius Verginius Tricostus Esquilinus =

Roman politician in 5th and 4th centuries BC

Lucius Verginius Tricostus Esquilinus was a Roman politician of the fifth and fourth centuries BC.

== Family ==
His grandfather Opiter Verginius Tricostus Esquilinus was consul in 478 BC, and his father Proculus Verginius Tricostus was consul in 435 BC and 434 BC.

== Career ==
In 402 BC, Verginius was elected consular tribune; his colleagues were Gaius Servilius Ahala, Quintus Servilius Fidenas, Quintus Sulpicius Camerinus Cornutus, Aulus Manlius Vulso Capitolinus and Manius Sergius Fidenas. The war against Veii was continued: the town of Anxur having been taken by the enemy, the war was extended by the sudden arrival of the Veientanes and the Falisci. Because of the defeat, with the aid of the Senate, Ahala forced the college of tribunes to abdicate in favor of a new college. In 401 BC Verginius was accused and condemned because he had not brought help when his colleague Servilius had asked him before Veii.
