= Gaius Julius Iullus (censor) =

Roman senator, consular tribune in 408 and 405 BC

Gaius Julius Iullus (Note: The original form of his surname was Iullus, which is supported by the literary tradition and is used by all modern sources. The spelling Iulus, with a single 'l', was adopted by the Fasti Capitolini probably after Vergil used it in his Aeneid.) was a Roman statesman and member of the ancient patrician gens Julia. He was consular tribune in 408 and 405 BC, and censor in 393.

== Family ==
Gaius Julius Iullus was the son of Spurius Julius Iullus, and grandson of Vopiscus Julius Iulus, consul in BC 473. (Note: The Dictionary of Greek and Roman Biography and Mythology identifies Gaius as the son of Lucius Julius, the consul of BC 430; but his filiation names his father as Spurius, and this is followed by Broughton. Although the praenomen Spurius is not normally associated with the Julii, in this case it seems to be confirmed, as it also appears in the filiation of Lucius Julius, consular tribune in 403 BC.) His uncle, Lucius Julius Iullus, was consular tribune in 438, magister equitum in 431, and consul in 430. Gaius' brother, Lucius, was consular tribune in 403 BC. It is not clear how they were related to the Lucius Julius who was consular tribune in 388 and 379 BC, or the Gaius who was nominated dictator in 352.

== Career ==
In 408 BC, Julius was one of three military tribunes with consular power. His colleagues were Gaius Servilius Ahala and Publius Cornelius Cossus. They took office in the midst of continuing strife over the desire of the plebeians to attain the highest offices of the state. The previous year, the tribunes of the plebs had succeeded in winning the election of the first plebeian quaestors, and while the Roman Senate steadfastly refused to open the consulship to the plebeians, the tribunes hoped to elect some of their number military tribunes with consular power, a position that had been expressly created with the intention of permitting members of either order to be elected. But in more than three decades, no plebeian had yet obtained that office, and despite the efforts of the tribunes of the plebs, the three elected were once again patricians.

Meanwhile, the Aequi and Volsci, whose territory had been invaded by a consular army the previous year, established a new fortification at Antium, intending to revenge themselves upon the Romans. Alarmed by this development, the senate ordered the consular tribunes to nominate a dictator. The tribunes Julius and Cornelius resented this directive, as they had been entrusted by the Roman people with the military command, and ought to be entitled to deal with the situation themselves. But as neither the senate nor the consular tribunes would back down, the third tribune, Ahala, nominated Publius Cornelius Rutilus, a cousin of his colleague, as dictator; in turn, Ahala was promptly appointed master of the horse. The Roman army quickly destroyed the enemy camp, and laid waste to Volscian territory.

In retaliation for the senate's peremptory treatment, the slighted tribunes announced that the chief magistrates of the following year would also be consular tribunes, thereby leaving open the possibility that plebeians might be elected. But the aristocratic party again secured all of the positions for patrician candidates: the previous year they had presented only those plebeians whose election seemed preposterous; this time they nominated those patrician candidates who were so respected that they easily won election.

Julius was consular tribune for the second time in 405, a year in which six men were elected to that office. His colleagues were Titus Quinctius Capitolinus, Quintus Quinctius Cincinnatus, Aulus Manlius Vulso, Lucius Furius Medullinus, and Manius Aemilius Mamercinus. The tribunes laid siege to Veii, alarming the other Etruscan cities, which debated uniting to come to Veii's defense.

In 393 BC, Gaius was elected to the censorship with Lucius Papirius Cursor. He died before the expiration of his term, and Marcus Cornelius Maluginensis was appointed in his place. As Rome was sacked by the Gauls during the same lustrum, a kind of superstitious dread attached itself to the censorship, so that never again was a substitute appointed in the place of a censor who had died; if his work remained unfinished, his colleague was compelled to resign, and entirely new censors were elected.

== See also ==
- Julia gens

== Bibliography ==
- Titus Livius (Livy), Ab Urbe Condita (History of Rome).
- Diodorus Siculus, Bibliotheca Historica (Library of History).
- Plutarchus, Lives of the Noble Greeks and Romans.
- "C. Julius L. f. Vop. n. Iulus" (no. 7) in the Dictionary of Greek and Roman Biography and Mythology, William Smith, ed., Little, Brown and Company, Boston (1849).
- T. Robert S. Broughton, The Magistrates of the Roman Republic, American Philological Association (1952).
