= Battle of Veii =

396 BC conflict involving ancient Rome

Coordinates: 42°01′26″N 12°24′5″E

- Part of the Roman–Etruscan Wars
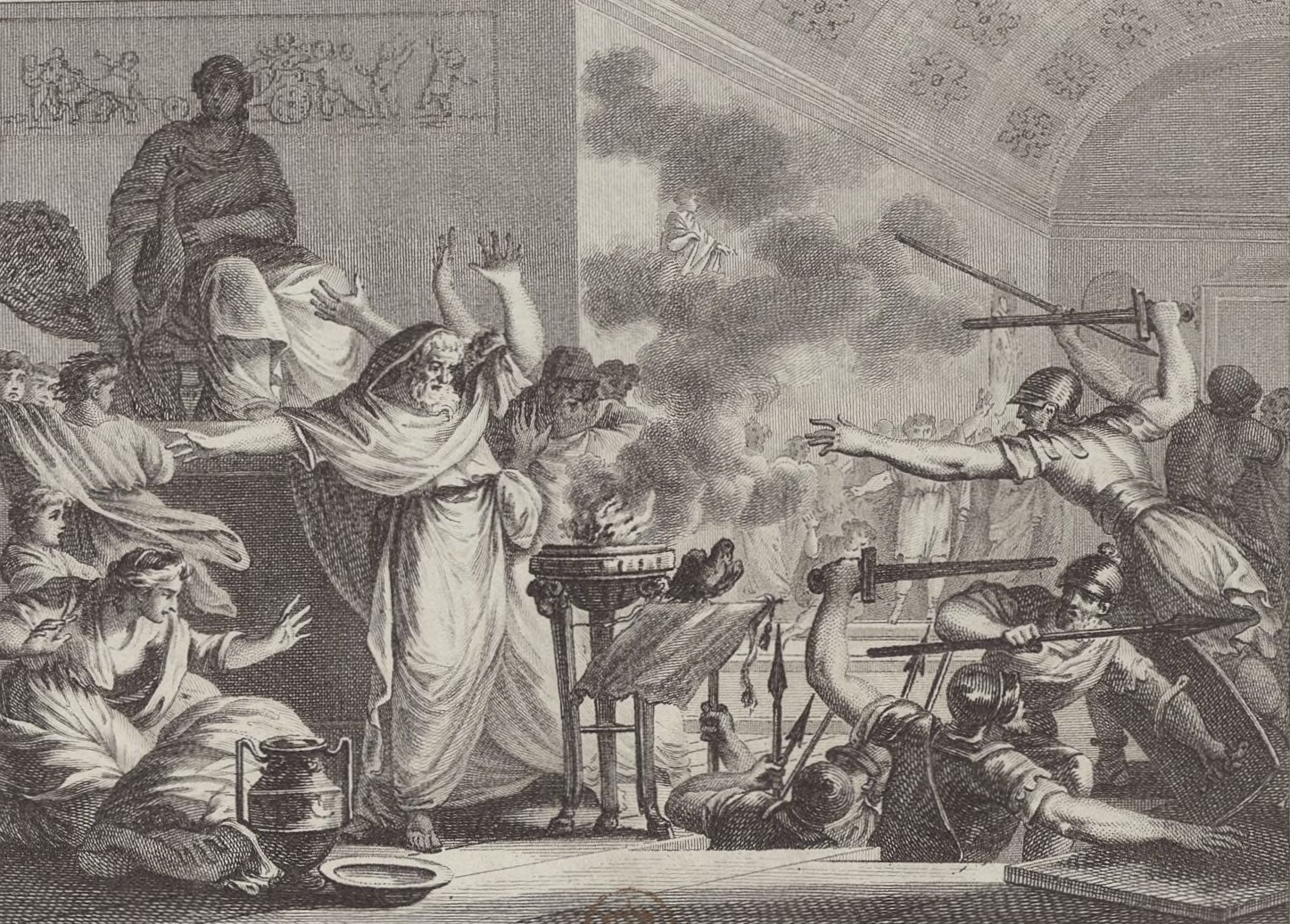
- Capture of Veii (engraving by S. D. Mirys from 1785, Figures de l'histoire de la république romaine)
Date	c. 396 BC
Location	Veii, near Rome
Result	Roman victory

Belligerents
Roman Republic	Veii (Etruscan city)

Commanders and leaders
Marcus Furius Camillus	

The battle of Veii, also known as the siege of Veii, involved ancient Rome, and is approximately dated at 396 BC. The main source about it is Livy's Ab Urbe Condita.

The battle of Veii was the final battle between the Romans, who were led by Marcus Furius Camillus, who had been elected dictator, and the Etruscan city of Veii. Veii had resisted the Romans in a long and inconclusive war with victories and defeats on both sides. The Romans besieged Veii and dug a tunnel beneath the city. Camillus attacked the city on all sides so as to distract the Veientines. The Romans then emerged from the tunnel and their forces quickly overwhelmed Veii.

== The siege ==
The Romans were led by Marcus Furius Camillus, elected dictator (in the Roman Republic, this was an emergency general rather than a tyrant) after Rome had suffered defeats. Their opponent, the Etruscan city of Veii, was a large city about 16 km (10 miles) from Rome. When Camillus took over command, Veii was under siege, and the Veientines had already destroyed a large quantity of siege equipment prepared by the Romans. In order to break into the city, the Romans dug a tunnel through the soft tufa rock on which the city was built.

Livy describes the scene with the Veientines holed up in their city, the main Roman force encamped outside and a second force set to attack from within via the tunnel. After Camillus had taken the auspices, he had uttered the following prayer:

Pythian Apollo, guided and inspired by thy will I go forth to destroy the city of Veii, and a tenth part of its spoils I devote to thee. Thee too, Queen Juno, who now dwellest in Veii, I beseech, that thou wouldst follow us, after our victory, to the City which is ours and which will soon be thine, where a temple worthy of thy majesty will receive thee.

Relying on the superior size of the Roman army, Camillus attacked the city on all sides. The intent of Camillus' attack was to distract the Veientines from the mine by forcing their soldiers to defend the walls.

The Veientines wondered "what had happened to make the Romans, after never stirring from their lines for so many days, now run recklessly up to the walls as though struck with sudden frenzy".

As the unsuspecting Veientines rushed to defend their walls from the sudden attack of the Roman army, picked Roman troops emerged from the entrance of the tunnel inside the temple of Juno. They quickly overwhelmed the Veientines and began a general massacre. As the fighting slackened, Camillus gave orders to spare the unarmed who began to surrender as the soldiers gathered loot.

The wealth so impressed Camillus that he gave a speech, during which he turned and stumbled, which was seen to be an omen of his later condemnation and the sack of Rome, which followed a few years later after the battle of the Allia.

The survivors were enslaved. The city was subsequently repopulated by Romans. This destruction of the Etruscan stronghold secured Rome's growing place in central Italy.

== Bibliography ==
=== Primary sources ===
- Livy (1905). From the Founding of the City . Translated by Canon Roberts – via Wikisource. (print: Book 1 as The Rise of Rome, Oxford University Press, 1998, ISBN 0-19-282296-9)

=== Secondary sources ===
- Grant, Michael (1993). The History of Rome. Faber and Faber. ISBN 0-571-11461-X.
