= Marcus Furius Camillus =

4th-century BC Roman dictator and general

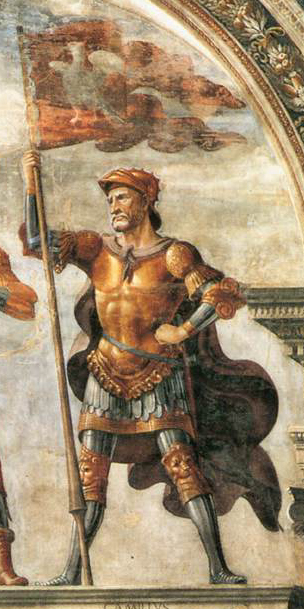
- Portrait by Domenico Ghirlandaio, c. 1483
- Born: c. 448 BC
- Died: c. 365 BC
- Occupations: Politician and soldier
- Office: Censor (403 BC); Consular tribune (403, 401, 398 BC); Dictator (396 BC); Consular tribune (394 BC); Dictator (390–389 BC); Consular tribune (386, 384, 381 BC); Dictator (368–367 BC)
- Children: L. Furius Camillus; Sp. Furius Camillus

Marcus Furius Camillus (/kəˈmɪləs/; possibly c. 448 – c. 365 BC) was a Roman statesman and politician during the early Roman republic who is most famous for his capture of Veii and defence of Rome from Gallic sack after the Battle of the Allia. Modern scholars are dubious of Camillus' supposed exploits and believe many of them are wrongly attributed or otherwise wholly fictitious.

== Historicity ==
The traditional account of Camillus' life comes from Livy and Plutarch's eponymous Life. But these were based on a larger annalistic tradition which painted Camillus as the dominant figure in this period of history; Livy, for his part, organised his fifth and sixth books around Camillus' career (Camillus enters public office at the start of the fifth book and leaves it at the end of the sixth). Little evidence of this tradition survives, though fragments of Quintus Claudius Quadrigarius' work indicate that the myth of Camillus was well-established by the 80s and 70s BC.

The name Camillus is attested in the Etruscan François Tomb, built c. 300 BC near Vulci. One of the paintings therein describes a "Gneve Tarchunies Rumach" (probably Gnaeus Tarquinius the Roman) being killed by a "Marce Camitlnas" (possibly Marcus Camitilius or Marcus Camillus). It is not known, however, what specific legend the tomb depicts. Some scholars have suggested that Camitlnas refers to the Camillus of this article, but such attribution is problematic.

Scholars believe Camillus qua person probably existed: the fasti, if believed, record his importance and influence in Roman public life at this time. But, in general, the quality of the sources – which interject "plenty of myth, embellishment, and fantasy" – led Mary Beard, in the book SPQR, to write "Camillus is probably not much less fictional than the first Romulus". Mommsen, writing in Römisches Strafrecht, called Camillus' legend "the most dishonest of all Roman legends". Tim Cornell, writing of Camillus, calls him "the most artificially contrived of all Rome's heroes".

Other scholars have suggested that Camillus emerged from a popular oral tradition which linked the names Camillus, Manlius Capitolinus, and Sulpicius to inscriptions placed on the temple of Juno Moneta (erected in 345 BC by Lucius Furius Camillus).

== Biography ==
The cognomen Camillus derives from the title of an aristocratic youth who helped in religious duties; it is possible that a young Camillus served in such a position. His filiation is identical with that of the consul of 413 BC, Lucius Furius Medullinus, which may indicate that Medullinus and Camillus were brothers.

=== Early career ===
Camillus is first firmly recorded as entering public office in 401 BC. He served in that year and again in 398 BC as consular tribune against the Falisci and the Capenates. Both were tribes near Rome and Veii. His first supposed office was that of censor (before having held any other public office) in the year 403 BC.

He was then supposed to have, as dictator, completed a campaign against Veii which saw the city captured in 396 BC. The specific story of Veii's capture in Livy is mostly legendary. After a ten-year siege (the third Veientine war) – "obviously modelled on the Greek legend of the Trojan war" – the Alban Lake rises supernaturally after a supposed prophecy of Veii's destruction in its "Books of Fate". The Romans then circumvent the prophecy by building a tunnel to drain the lake after being so instructed by the oracle at Delphi. Camillus, as commander, then persuades Veii's goddess, Juno Regina, to leave the city and move to Rome. Archaeological remains near Veii include blocked drainage tunnels from the fifth century, which may indicate the possibility that this story in Livy arises a Romans breakthrough into the city through them.

Following the capture of the city, Livy reports that Camillus had its free population sold into slavery before the land was resettled with Roman citizens with land allotments of seven jugera. Archaeological evidence points to Romans switching quarries: after the capture of Veii's better-quality quarries, Roman structures switch largely to using stone sourced therefrom, which may suggest enslaved Veientine quarry workers. Camillus then celebrates a triumph and dedicates a temple of Juno on the Aventine. It is likely that many of the details of his return in Livy were copied from the less historically distant triumphal entrances of Scipio Africanus or Sulla.

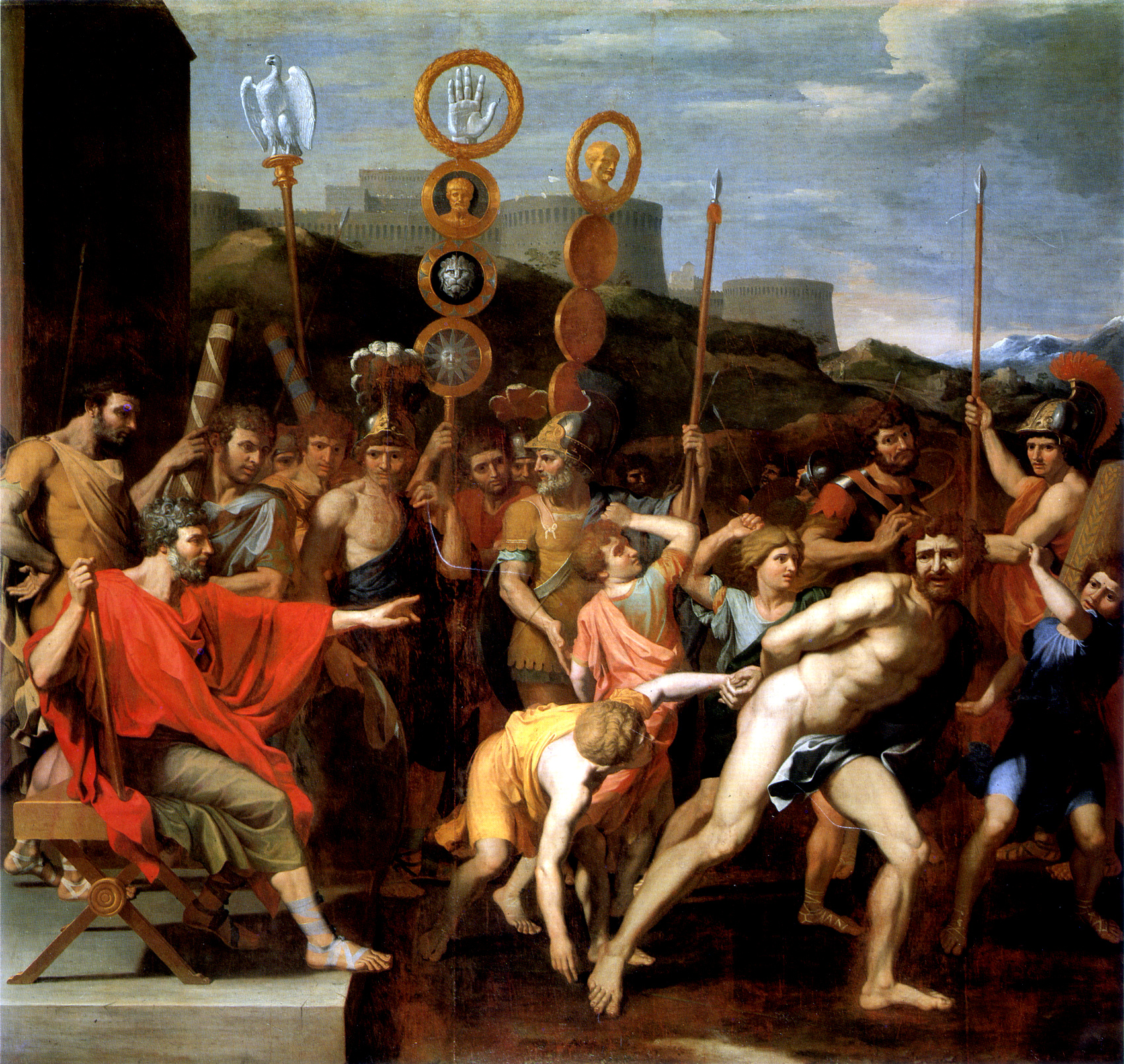
Camille Delivers the Schoolmaster of Falerii to His Pupils (Nicolas Poussin, 1637)

In 394 BC, he supposedly secured the surrender of the Falisci in their main town of Falerii Veteres (modern Civita Castellana) after refusing to accept pupils from a schoolmaster as hostages. Much of the Livian narrative about the exchange with the schoolmaster is meant to recount an exemplum which stresses the importance of Roman good will (Latin: fides) and the importance of gentlemanly aristocratic behaviour.

After taking Veii and Falisci, Camillus is supposed to have been prosecuted. Accounts differ: he may have been accused by the quaestors of misappropriating spoils of war or of his extravagance in purchasing four white horses for his triumph. Whatever the charge, though a quaestorian trial for misappropriation is more likely, Camillus was reportedly convicted and sent into exile. Historians believe this story of disgrace before the courts is modelled on fates of Achilles and Scipio Africanus and is meant to draw comparison with Themistocles and Gnaeus Marcius Coriolanus. The underlying source for the story likely postdates the Sullan period and is an "evident anachronism". The story of conviction, however, likely did not happen and was instead adduced to place Camillus away from Rome when the Gallic sack occurs, excusing him of any blame for Rome's defeat.

=== Gallic sack ===
In 390 BC (Varronian), or more likely in 387 BC, a large group of Gauls crossed the Apennines into northern Etruria. They advanced until they reached Roman territory and there defeated Rome's army at the Battle of the Allia. In the following days, they entered Rome and sacked it. They then induced the surrender of Roman holdouts on the Capitoline Hill before receiving a large ransom of gold and withdrawing north. This account is corroborated by Greek sources as early as the 4th century BC; Polybius places the sack in the same year as the Peace of Antalcidas and the siege of Rhegium.

According to Livy, after the fall of the city, Camillus is recalled from exile at Ardea by the people and appointed again as dictator – even though a consular tribune was available to nominate a dictator in the normal fashion – in the city's hour of need. Then, at the climax of the Gallic sack, when a thousand pounds of gold is being weighed out, Camillus and a hastily organised army returns and defeats the Gauls, saving the city and recovering the ransom. This story was probably a creation of Roman annalists during the first century BC; Ogilvie in his Commentary on Livy, calls it "one of the most daring fabrications in Roman history". Other traditions have different narratives: for example, the Livii Drusi are supposed to have by single combat with a Gaul named Drausus recovered the same ransom; Plutarch records a fragment of Aristotle asserting that "a certain Lucius" (probably a Lucius Albinius who is recorded to have secreted away the Vestal Virgins and sacred objects to Caere) having saved the city.

Polybius reports that rather than being defeated by Camillus, the Gauls occupied the city for some seven months before the Romans bought them off and they departed of their own accord to deal with an invasion of their territory by the Veneti. While the literary sources assert Rome was sacked and had to be rebuilt, there is no archaeological evidence of major damage to pre-fourth century BC buildings in the forum, which indicates that the sack – if it occurred – consisted largely of stealing portable property.

After the sack, Camillus is supposed to have led the opposition to a proposal circulating among the plebs to relocate the city to Veii. This story also cannot be accepted and is more likely "a reflection of the tensions that arose concerning the distribution of the conquered territory of Veii" and to introduce "anti-plebeian elements" into the Camillan narrative. The speech does not appear in Polybius and may have been invented c. 122 BC in order to oppose by historical precedent Gaius Gracchus' proposal to establish a colony at Carthage with further embellishment of its anti-Italian themes during the time of the Social War.

Regardless, the ancient tradition records that within a year after Rome was reduced to ruins, the city had been completely rebuilt and all rebellions by Roman allies suppressed due to the extraordinary leadership of Camillus, who is therefore regarded as the city's "second founder". In these victories, he is supposed to have dedicated three gold saucers to Juno for victory against the Volscians, Aequians, and Etruscans all the next year in 389 BC. None of these achievements are mentioned in Polybius or Diodorus.

=== Later career ===
Livy next reports Rome sending Camillus to take the city of Tusculum in 381 BC. The city, already surrounded by Roman territory, immediately surrenders and the inhabitants thereof are given Roman citizenship with some level of self-rule, becoming the first Roman municipium. Tusculum would be one of the first to revolt in the Second Latin War.

Both Camillus' role in Manlius' sedition and his later dictatorship (engaging the Gauls and plebeian reforms) may be anachronistic and fictitious insertions.

==== Manlius ====
The account of Dio, coming from a Byzantine summary by Zonaras, asserts Camillus was elected dictator in 384 BC to put down the sedition of Marcus Manlius Capitolinus, who is believed to be trying to make himself king. Camillus reportedly has Manlius arrested by a slave before a trial; Manlius is convicted and then thrown from the Tarpeian Rock. No such attribution is given in the accounts of Livy and Plutarch, who note Camillus merely as one of the six consular tribunes in that year.

==== Licinio-Sextian rogations ====
According to Livy, there are ten years in which Gaius Licinius Stolo and Lucius Sextius Lateranus were elected plebeian tribunes continuously. During the last five or six years, they blocked the election of all magistrates in an attempt to pass what would become the Licinio-Sextian rogations. Camillus is alleged to have been elected dictator in 368 BC and attempted to obstruct their attempts, without success. But the next year, he is appointed dictator again. He then reconciles the plebeians and the patricians with a proposal to appoint a patrician-only praetor and curule aediles (in exchange for plebeian eligibility to the consulship); all accept the passage of the rogations and domestic harmony is restored; Camillus then constructs a temple to Concordia. "Very little of this narrative can be accepted as it stands". While Diodorus Siculus reports the length of the anarchy to have been merely one year, it is implausible that Rome could have been without magistrates for more than a few months. More damningly, a passage of Aulus Gellius' Attic Nights (5.4) preserves a fragment of Numerius Fabius Pictor that shows that alleged years where tribunes blocked all elections were a late annalistic invention, likely to line up Greek and Roman chronologies.

The three alleged rogations touched on a number of topics. The first rogation was a mechanism for debt relief. The second imposed a possession limit of 500 jugera of public land. The third was the reform that abolished the consular tribunate and required the election of consuls, one of which had to be a plebeian. Gary Forsythe, in Critical history of early Rome, accepts that the first law is consistent with voiced concerns over indebtedness from this period, that the second (limits on public land possession) is attested to in later speeches, and that the third is reflected in the consular fasti.

Livy includes in the same year of this compromise, 367 BC, another alleged victory by Camillus over the Gauls. Modern scholars are especially suspicious of this report, especially because Livy notes confusion in his own sources over this victory, which is alternatively attributed to Titus Manlius Torquatus.

==== Death ====
According the ancient Roman tradition, Camillus died during an epidemic that hit Rome in 365 BC. However, it is unlikely that any evidence of Camillus' death was known in later times: Münzer, writing in the Realencyclopädie, believes later annalists simply assumed Camillus died in the epidemic.

== Legacy ==
By the late republic, after centuries of embellishment from the fourth to the first century BC, the Romans believed that Camillus had captured Veii, saved the city from the Gallic sack, saved the city from foreign threats on all sides, opened the highest magistracies to the plebeians, ensured domestic harmony, and largely settled the struggle of the orders. Through it all, they believed he had held six consular tribunates and been dictator five times. For these reasons, he was hailed as the second founder of the city. A bronze statue of Camillus also bedecked itself on the rostra in the Forum.

His reputation by the late republic and early empire was such that Camillus was a source of exempla: fables giving lessons for Romans on how to act in line both with morals and with Roman tradition and procedures. One of the most famous ones is during Camillus' capture of Faliscii: one of their schoolmasters defects, bringing with him to the camp his pupils who are Faliscan nobles' children. Camillus, displaying his exemplary fides, has the schoolmaster reprimanded and punished by the pupils; the Faliscans then surrender the city before Camillus' good faith. Camillus is similarly alleged to have resigned a dictatorship to which he was appointed merely because of faulty procedure; Livy mentions it – an event that "almost certainly never took place" – as an example of Roman legal scruples. In all, Camillus is mentioned in Livy's Ab urbe condita as an example to be followed eight times, an "unusually high frequency", usually in relation to his alleged successes as a general, moderation in the face of hot-headed colleagues, and triumphant recall from exile.

The memory of Camillus became part of the public image of the first Roman emperor Augustus. The history of Livy, for example, may have been written to coincide at the beginning of a great year consisting of 360–365 years. Starting with Romulus, the cycle reaches a peak under king Servius Tullius before a second founding under Camillus, completing the cycle. The next cycle has a second peak in the time of Scipio Africanus before Augustus enters as the figure to re-found Rome again and restart the great year, with Livy suggesting that Romulus, Camillus, and Augustus are coequal heroic figures.
