= Cossus (disambiguation) =

Cossus may refer to:

== Species ==
- Cossus, various species of moth
- Hygrophorus cossus, species of fungus

== People ==
- Aulus Cornelius Cossus, Roman general
- Cossus Cornelius Lentulus, multiple people
- Gnaeus Cornelius Cossus (consular tribune 406 BC), Roman consular tribune
- Gnaeus Cornelius Cossus (consul 409 BC), Roman consul
- Publius Cornelius Cossus (consular tribune 415 BC), Roman consular tribune
- Publius Cornelius Rutilus Cossus, Roman statesman
- Aulus Cornelius Cossus Arvina, Roman statesman
