= Bolae =

Human settlement in Italy

Bolae or Bola was an ancient city of Latium that was repeatedly mentioned in the early history of Rome. It was likely located in the territory of the modern town of Labico.

== History ==
Its foundation is expressly ascribed by Virgil to the kings of Alba Longa, and its name is found also in the list given by Diodorus Siculus of the colonies of that city. Hence, there is no doubt that it was properly a Latin city, though its name does not appear among the list of those that composed the Latin League. But it fell at an early period into the hands of the Aequians. Dionysius of Halicarnassus describes it as one of the towns taken by Coriolanus, together with Toleria and Labicum; and though Livy does not notice its conquest upon that occasion, he speaks of it as an Aequian town, when the name next occurs in history towards the end of the 5th century BC. In this instance the Bolani were among the foremost to engage in war, and ravaged the lands of the neighboring Labicum, but being unsupported by the rest of the Aequians, they were defeated, and their town taken. It was, however, recovered by the Aequians, and a fresh colony established there, but was again taken by the Romans under Publius Postumius Albus Regillensis, and it was on this occasion that the proposal to establish a Roman colony there, and portion out its lands among the settlers, gave rise to one of the fiercest mutinies in Roman history.

Whether the colony was actually sent, the town was again in the hands of the Aequians in 389 BC, when they were defeated beneath its walls by Marcus Furius Camillus; but Diodorus Siculus represents it as then occupied by the Latins, and besieged by the Aequians. This is the last mention of the name in history: it was probably destroyed during these wars, as we find no subsequent trace of its existence; and it is enumerated by Pliny among the towns which had in his time utterly disappeared. The site is called Poli, situated in the mountains about eight miles north of Praeneste; but Livy tells us that its ager bordered on that of Labicum, and the narratives of Dionysius and Plutarch above cited seem clearly to point to a situation in the neighborhood of Labicum and Pedum. Hence it is much more probable, as suggested by Francesco Ficoroni and Antonio Nibby, that it occupied the site of Lugano, a village about 5 miles south of Palestrina (Praeneste), and 9 miles southeast of La Colonna (Labicum). The position is, like that of most of the other towns in this neighborhood, naturally fortified by the ravines that surround it: and its situation between the Aequian mountains on the one side, and the heights of Algidus Mons on the other, would necessarily render it a military point of importance both to Aequians and Latins.
