= Ludovici =

Ludovici is an Italian and Latin language surname from the personal name Ludovicus. Notable people with the name include:

- Albert Ludovici Sr. (1820–1894), German painter
- Anthony Ludovici (1882–1971), British philosopher, sociologist, social critic and polyglot
- Carl Günther Ludovici (1707–1778), German philosopher, lexicographer and economist
- Jakob Friedrich Ludovici (1671–1723), German jurist
- Laurence James Ludovici (1910–1996), American non-fiction author
