= Paolo Alessandro Maffei =

Italian antiquarian and writer (1653–1716)

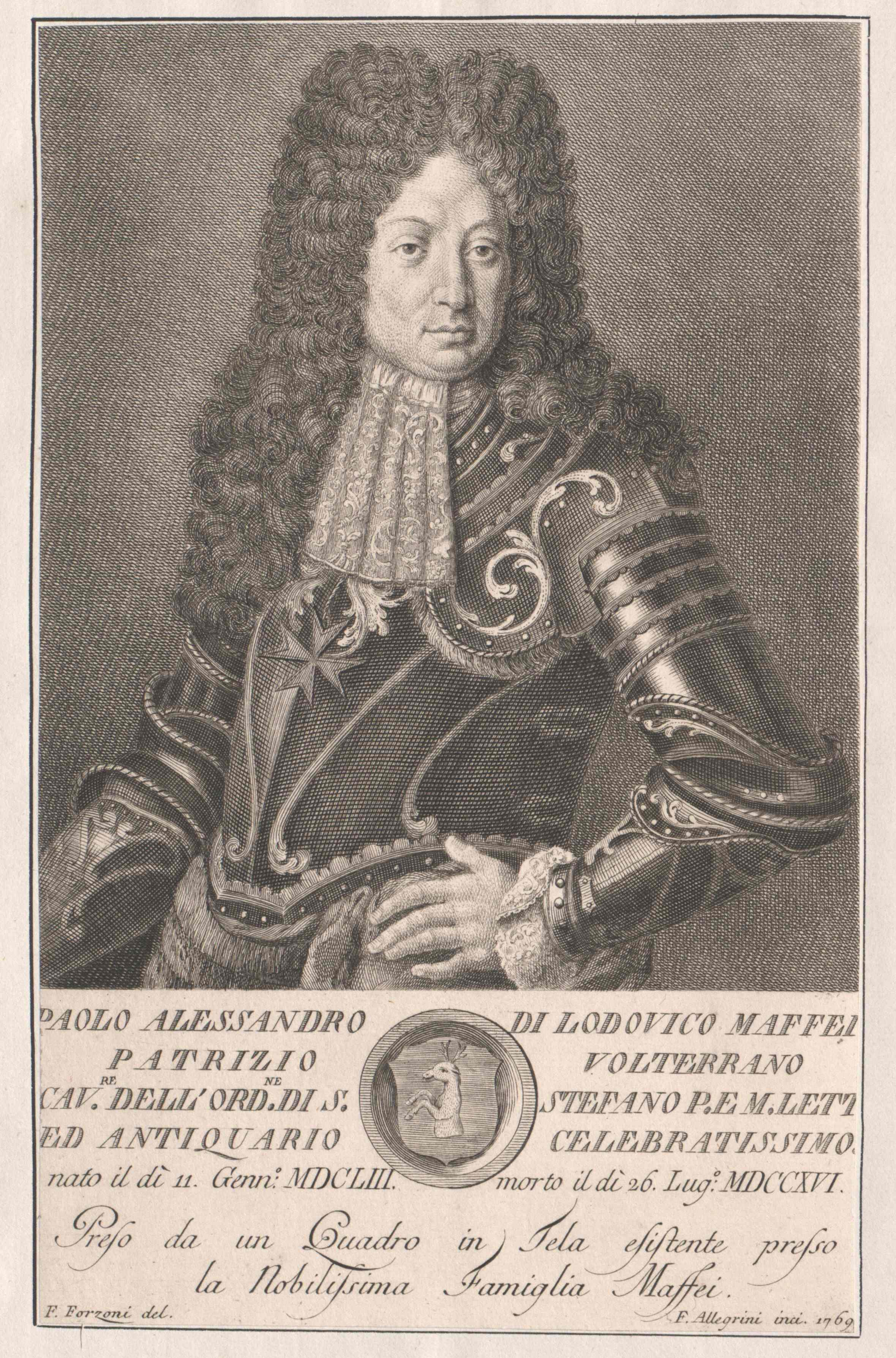

Paolo Alessandro Maffei (11 January 1653 – 26 July 1716) was an antiquarian with a humanist education, who was active in Rome. Maffei was the son of Paolo Maffei and his wife Giovanna di Raffaele, both of patrician families of Volterra. He was a descendant of the humanist and papal bureaucrat Raffaello Maffei, "il Volterrano," (1451–1522), author of the Commentaria urbana (1506), dedicated to Julius II. Paolo Alessandro was made a cavaliere of the Tuscan Order of Saint Stephen and an honorary member of the Papal Guard. He wrote the laudatory biography of Pope Pius V, in which he praised the Pope's suppression of newsletters and slanderous printed avvisi in 1572.

Maffei's name is familiar to art historians today because, when the entrepreneurial printer-publisher Domenico de' Rossi published a collection of engravings of ancient and modern Roman sculpture, Raccolta di statue antiche e moderne (Rome, 1704), he turned to the well-known antiquarian for suitably learned descriptive text, for what was in effect the first eighteenth-century art book, whose refined engravings by French artists were designed to appeal to the cognoscenti. The lavish folio volumes concentrated on the best-known ancient sculptures, with a handful of modern ones in prominent collections, and some antiquities that were interesting to the enlightened amateur largely for their attributed subject matter. The arrangement of the plates by collection demonstrated that the most admired Roman sculptures, aside from the pre-eminent collection in the Cortile del Belvedere, had come to rest in four great family collections: Farnese, Medici, Borghese and Ludovici, and, as Haskell and Penny have noted, no recent excavations had added new examples to the established canon of Roman antiquities.

Three further volumes on similar principles followed, concerned with engraved gems, a notable field for aristocratic collectors (and one rife with excellent sixteenth- and seventeenth-century fakes), Gemme antiche figurate date in luce da Domenico de' Rossi colle sposizioni di Paolo Alessandro Maffei, (Rome 1707). Rossi may have been inspired by Mattei's copious notes contributed, under the name Paolo Antoniano, to the more erudite volume on the satires of "Quintus Settanus", the pseudonym of Lodovico Sergardi, Satyrae, numero auctae mendes purgatae & singulae locupletiores... (Rome 1700). Sergardi's satires themselves were based on Roman originals.

Under the disguise of Paolo Riccobadi del Bovo he published a defense of Bernard de Montfaucon's Diario Italico against the critical attacks of Francesco Ficoroni.

A fire consumed all his library and his literary correspondence with other erudite Europeans, among whom was Gottfried Wilhelm Leibniz, with the result that, as a man of letters, he is remembered largely for the notes in the commercial enterprise of the Raccolta di Statue.
