= Publius Cornelius Cossus (consular tribune 408 BC) =

Roman Republican consular tribune in 408 BC

Publius Cornelius Cossus was a consular tribune in 408 BC of the Roman Republic.

Cornelius belonged to the Cornelia gens, one of the older patrician gens of the Republic. Cornelius father was the Roman hero Aulus Cornelius Cossus who had killed the King of the Veii, Lars Tolumnius, in single combat. Cornelius had two known brothers, Aulus Cornelius Cossus, consul in 413 BC and Gnaeus Cornelius Cossus, consul in 409 BC. Following filiations it would seem that Gnaeus Cornelius Cossus, consular tribune in 406, and Publius Cornelius Cossus, consular tribune in 395 BC, were the sons of Cornelius or his namesake, Publius Cornelius Cossus, consular tribune in 415 BC.

== Career ==
Cornelius held the imperium in 408 BC as one of three consular tribunes. His colleagues in the office were Gaius Julius Iulus and Gaius Servilius Ahala. None of them had previous consular experience. Their deliberations seemed to have been plagued with internal strife. Cornelius' colleague Servilius moved against his colleagues and appointed a dictator, Publius Cornelius Rutilus Cossus.

Cornelius' two colleagues would continue to flourish within the political scene with both being re-elected as consular tribunes in 407 BC and 405 BC while Servilius was elected as a tribune in 402 BC.

== See also ==
- Cornelia gens – Ancient Roman family

Political offices
Preceded by Gnaeus Cornelius Cossus; Lucius Furius Medullinus	Consular tribune of the Roman Republic with Gaius Julius Iulus; Publius Cornelius Cossus; 408 BC	Succeeded by Lucius Furius Medullinus; Gaius Servilius Ahala; Gaius Valerius Potitus Volusus; Numerius Fabius Vibulanus
