= Gnaeus Cornelius Cossus (consul 409 BC) =

Fifth century BC Roman Republican consul

Gnaeus Cornelius Cossus was a consular tribune in 414 BC and consul in 409 BC of the Roman Republic.

Cornelius belonged to the Cornelia gens, one of the older patrician gentes of the Republic. Cornelius' father was the Roman hero Aulus Cornelius Cossus who had slain the King of the Veii, Lars Tolumnius, in single combat. Cornelius had two known brothers, Aulus Cornelius Cossus, consul in 413 BC and Publius Cornelius Cossus, consular tribune in 408 BC. There are no known children of Cornelius.

== Career ==
Cornelius first held the imperium in 414 BC as one of four consular tribunes. His colleagues in the office were Lucius Valerius Potitus, Quintus Fabius Vibulanus and Publius Postumius Albinus Regillensis; with the exception of Fabius, all the consular tribunes were newcomers to the imperium. The consular tribunes fought a successful war against the Aequi which resulted in the capture of Bolae. This newly captured territory came to be a focal point for strife as Marcus Sextius, a tribune of the plebs, proposed an agrarian law to colonize Bolae while blaming the consular tribune Postumius for misconduct. The conflict would culminate in a mutiny among the Roman soldiers stationed at Bolae resulting in the death of both Postumius and a Roman quaestor, Publius Sestius. It is unclear what role Cornelius played during these events.

Cornelius was elected as one of two ordinary consuls in 409 BC. His consular colleague was Lucius Furius Medullinus, who held the consulship for the second time. There was a war against the Aequi and the Volscians which ended inconclusively with the Romans losing the fortress of Arx Carventana while capturing the city of Verrugo. The year was marred by social strife within Rome as part of the Conflict of the Orders between plebeians and patricians. Three plebeian tribunes, all belonging to the Icilia gens, successfully secured the election of plebeians to the quaestorship and the temporary abolition of the patrician exclusive consuls in favour of the return of the non-patrician exclusive consular tribunes. The change came into effect immediately; three of the four quaestors of this year were plebeian and consuls would not return until 366 BC (with the exception of a short stint between 393 BC and 392 BC) when it was opened for both patricians and plebeians.

== Conflicting traditions and censor ==
The sources covering this period in the history of Rome are sporadic and usually contradictory. The identity and traditions surrounding Cornelius are no exception. Cornelius, as the consular tribune in 414 BC, was given the praenomen of Gaius by Diodorus, Gnaeus by Livy and his name was completely missing from the Fasti Capitolini. Gnaeus is preferred by most modern scholars as Gaius is otherwise unattested among the Cornelia. Diodorus again strays from our other sources in 409 BC and has Pompeius instead of Cornelius. It is again assumed that the ancient historian was incorrect in this regard as no member of the Pompeia appears again until the 2nd century BC.

Cornelius could have been one of the unknown censors who completed the lustrum between 417 BC and 404 BC as suggested by the classicist Jaakko Suolahti. Suolahti, drawing from the fact that the census described in 403 BC is numbered lustrum XVI and counting from lustrum X which was held in 459 BC only sums to four pairs of censors (in 443, 435, 430 and 418 BC), thus a missing lustrum XV. Additionally drawing upon a gap in the Fasti Capitolini from 414 BC to 410 BC the censorship can likely be placed within this time frame, with Suolahti leaning towards the year 410 BC. Suolahti's main suggestions for these unknown censors are Spurius Nautius Rutilus and Manius Aemilius Mamercinus, but adds Cornelius as one of the viable options. While Suolahti argues for the existence of these unknown censors and lustrum XV, these possible candidates should be noted, and are noted by the author himself, as simply educated guesses based on the suitability of the candidates to the office and are in the author's words "mere suppositions".

== See also ==
- Cornelia gens – Ancient Roman family

Political offices
Preceded by Numerius Fabius Vibulanus; Publius Cornelius Cossus; Gaius Valerius Potitus Volusus; Quintus Quinctius Cincinnatus	Consular tribune of the Roman Republic with Lucius Valerius Potitus; Quintus Fabius Vibulanus; Publius Postumius Albus Regillensis; 414 BC	Succeeded by Aulus Cornelius Cossus; Lucius Furius Medullinus
Preceded by Manius Aemilius Mamercinus; Gaius Valerius Potitus Volusus	Consul of the Roman Republic with Lucius Furius Medullinus; 409 BC	Succeeded by Gaius Julius Iulus; Gaius Servilius Ahala; Publius Cornelius Cossus
