= Johann Joachim Winckelmann =

German art historian (1717–1768)

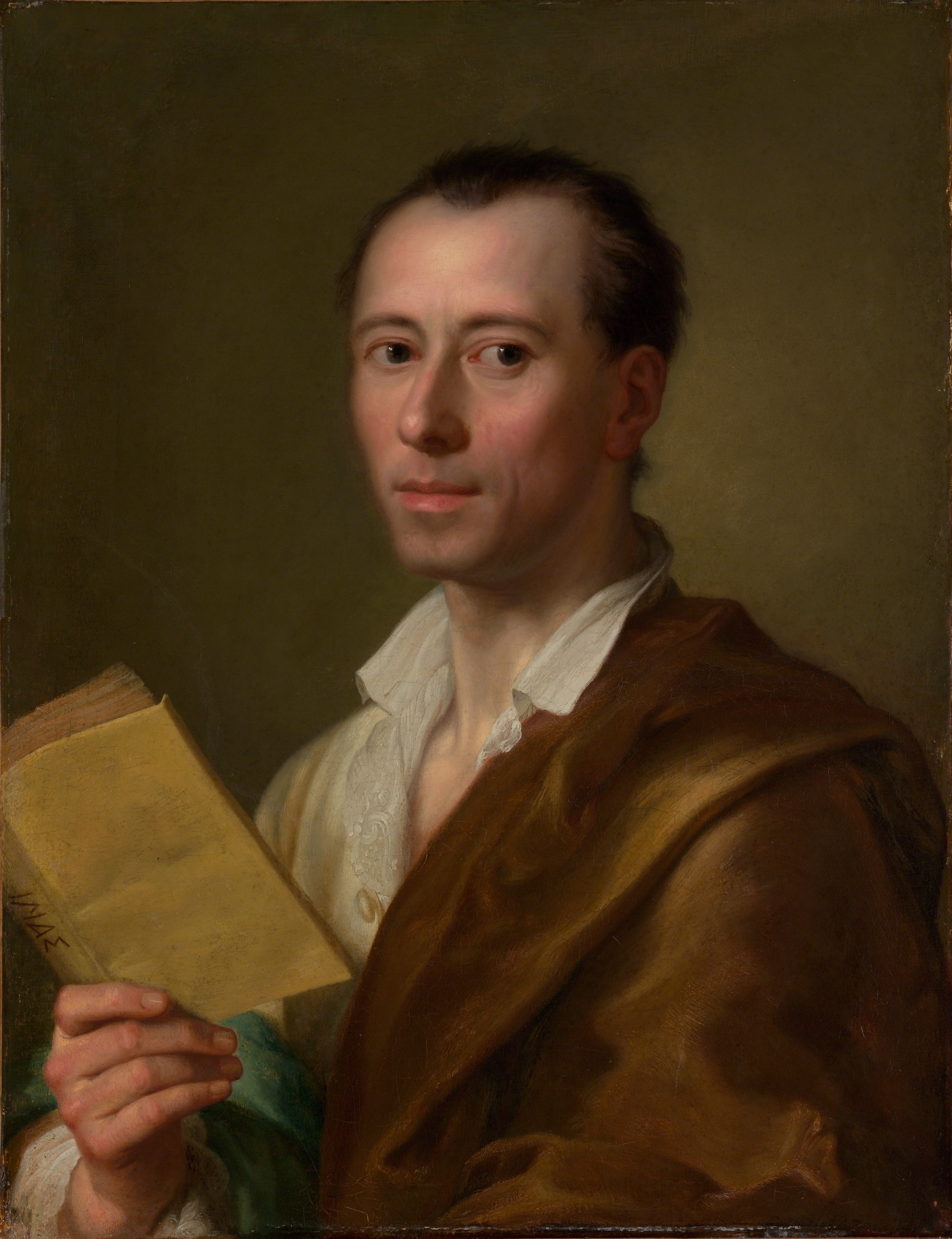
- Portrait by Raphael Mengs, after 1755
- Born: 9 December 1717; Stendal, Margraviate of Brandenburg, Holy Roman Empire
- Died: 8 June 1768 (aged 50); Trieste, Habsburg Empire
- Education: University of Halle
- Known for: Geschichte der Kunst des Alterthums (The History of Art in Antiquity; 1764); Contribution to the rise of the neoclassical movement
- Scientific career
- Fields: Archaeology, art history

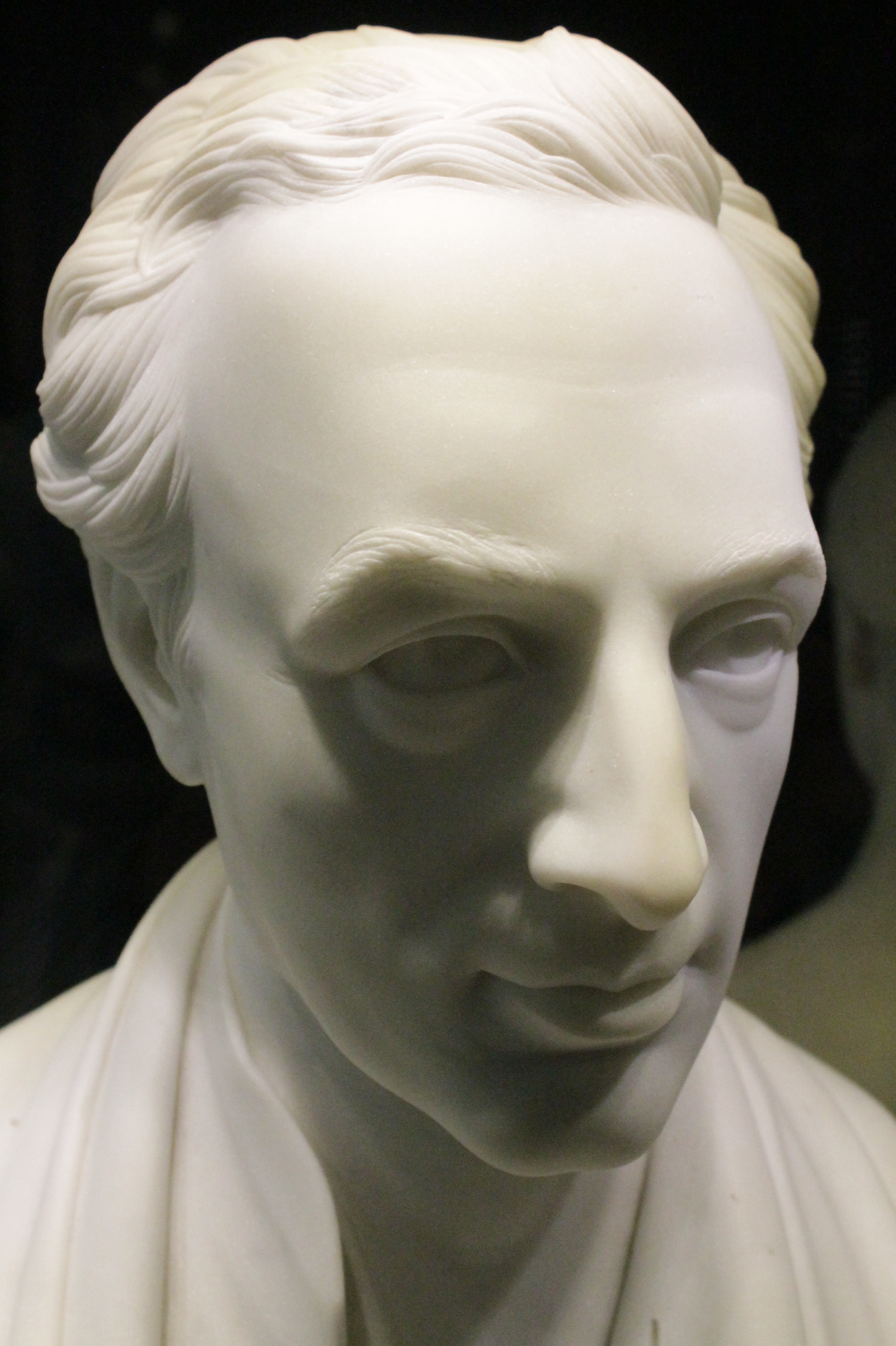
Johann Joachim Winckelmann by Ferdinand Pettrich, 1866, Albertinum, Dresden

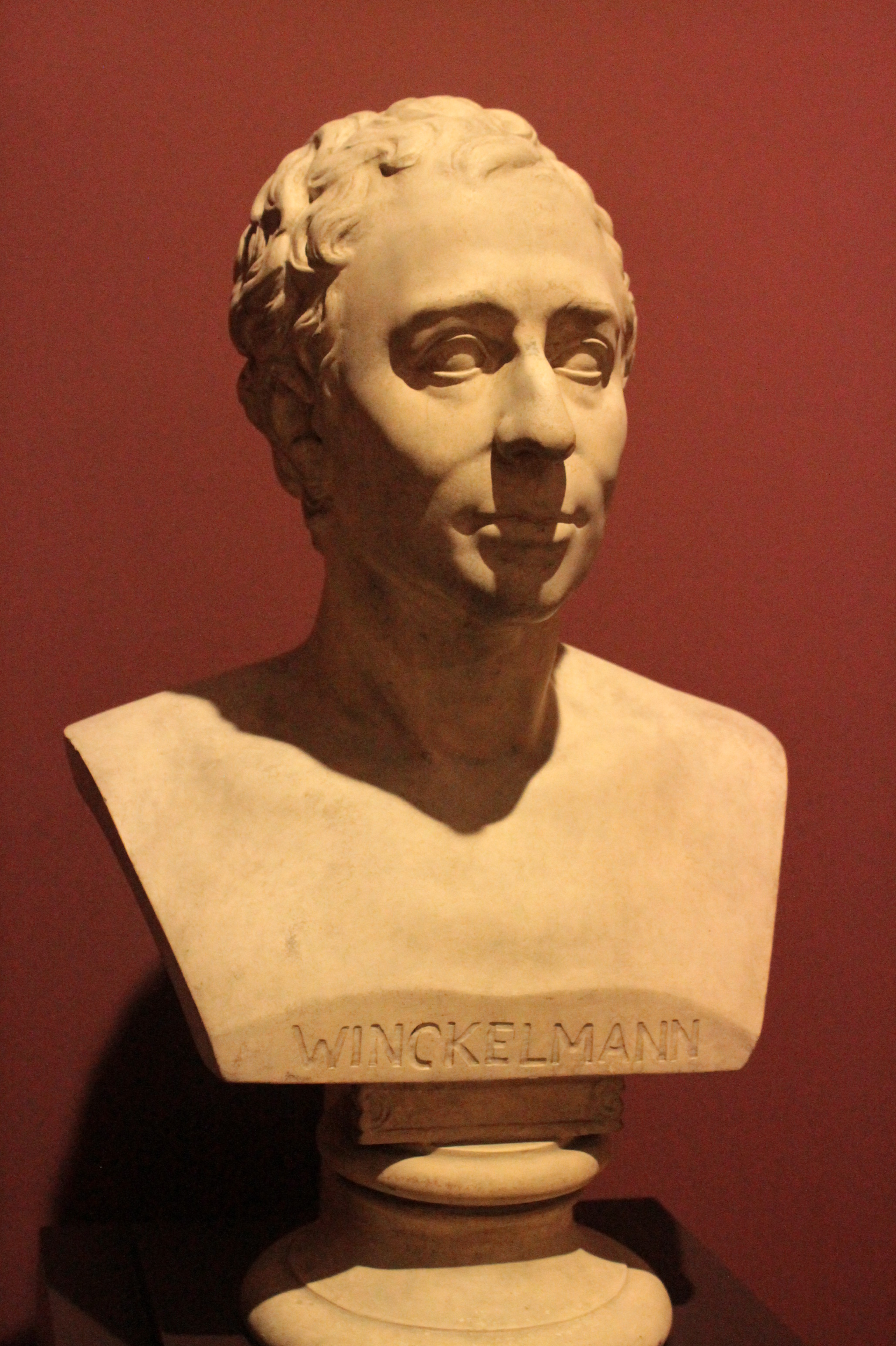
Johann Joachim Winckelmann by Friedrich Wilhelm Doell 1778, Museum of Old Masters, Dresden

Johann Joachim Winckelmann (US: /ˈvɪŋkəlmɑːn/ VINK-əl-mahn; German: [ˈjoːhan ˈjoːaxɪm ˈvɪŋkl̩man]; 9 December 1717 – 8 June 1768) was a German art historian and archaeologist. He was a pioneering Hellenist who first articulated the differences between Greek, Greco-Roman and Roman art. "The prophet and founding hero of modern archaeology", Winckelmann was one of the founders of scientific archaeology and first applied the categories of style on a large, systematic basis to the history of art. Many consider him the father of the discipline of art history. He was one of the first to separate Greek art into periods and time classifications.

He had a decisive influence on the rise of the Neoclassical movement during the late 18th century. His writings influenced not only a new science of archaeology and art history but Western painting, sculpture, literature and even philosophy. Winckelmann's History of Ancient Art (1764) was one of the first books written in German to become a classic of European literature. His subsequent influence on Gotthold Ephraim Lessing, Johann Gottfried Herder, Johann Wolfgang von Goethe, Friedrich Hölderlin, Heinrich Heine, Friedrich Nietzsche, Stefan George and Oswald Spengler has been provocatively called "the Tyranny of Greece over Germany".

Winckelmann maintained frequent correspondence with close male friends. He was frequently reflecting on male friendship through the lens of classical Greek ideals. In a 1752 letter, he expressed a great admiration for Frederick the Great as a "divine monarch" and praised Potsdam as a modern revival of "Athens and Sparta". Subsequent biographers and art historians—including Berthold Vallentin in his 1931 biography—have analyzed the presence of homoerotic themes and classical male friendship or männliche Liebe in his private letters. Winckelman's letters and aesthetic writings were celebrated by Johann Wolfgang von Goethe who understood them through a Platonic lens in his 1805 memorial essay Winckelmann und sein Jahrhundert.

In his major work, Geschichte der Kunst des Alterthums or The History of Ancient Art (1764), Winckelmann acknowledged classical literary evidence (such as Plato) indicating that ancient Greek sculptures were originally painted. Despite this awareness, he regarded color as secondary to line, outline, and design (Zeichnung). Winckelmann argued that white marble was optically superior for revealing form, writing that "color contributes to beauty, but it is not beauty itself" and that white surfaces reflect the greatest number of light rays.

== Biography ==
=== Early life ===
Winckelmann was born in poverty in Stendal in the Margraviate of Brandenburg. His father, Martin Winckelmann, worked as a cobbler, while his mother, Anna Maria Meyer, was the daughter of a weaver. Winckelmann's early years were full of hardship, but his academic interests pushed him forward. Later in Rome, when he had become a famous scholar, he wrote: "One gets spoiled here; but God owed me this; in my youth I suffered too much."

Winckelmann attended the Köllnisches Gymnasium in Berlin and the Altstädtisches Gymnasium at Salzwedel, and in 1738, at the age of 21, went as a student of theology to the University of Halle. However, Winckelmann was no theologian; he had become interested in Greek classics in his youth, but soon realized that the teachers in Halle could not satisfy his intellectual interests in this field. He nonetheless devoted himself privately to Greek and followed the lectures of Alexander Gottlieb Baumgarten, who coined the term "aesthetics". During this period, he became an enthusiastic translator of Herodotus.

With the intention of becoming a physician, in 1740 Winckelmann attended medical classes at Jena. He also taught languages. From 1743 to 1748, he was the deputy headmaster of the gymnasium of Seehausen in the Altmark but Winckelmann felt that work with children was not his true calling. Moreover, his means were insufficient: his salary was so low that he had to rely on his students' parents for free meals. He was thus obliged to accept a tutorship near Magdeburg. Whilst working as a tutor for the powerful Lamprecht family, he fell into unrequited love with the handsome Lamprecht son. This was one of a series of such loves throughout his life. His enthusiasm for the male form excited Winckelmann's budding admiration of ancient Greek and Roman sculpture.

=== Count von Bünau's librarian ===
In 1748, Winckelmann wrote to Count Heinrich von Bünau: "[L]ittle value is set on Greek literature, to which I have devoted myself so far as I could penetrate, when good books are so scarce and expensive". In the same year, Winckelmann was appointed secretary of von Bünau's library at Nöthnitz, near Dresden. The library contained some 40,000 volumes. Winckelmann had read Homer, Herodotus, Sophocles, Xenophon, and Plato, but he found at Nöthnitz the works of such famous Enlightenment writers as Voltaire and Montesquieu. To leave behind the spartan atmosphere of Prussia came as a great relief for Winckelmann. His major duty involved assisting von Bünau in writing a book on the Holy Roman Empire and helping collect material for it; during this period he made several visits to the collection of antiquities at Dresden, but his description of its best paintings remained unfinished. The treasures there, nevertheless, awakened in Winckelmann an intense interest in art, which was deepened by his association with various artists, particularly the painter Adam Friedrich Oeser (1717–1799)—a future friend of and influence on Johann Wolfgang von Goethe—who encouraged Winckelmann in his aesthetic studies. (Winckelmann subsequently exercised a powerful influence over Goethe.)

In 1755, Winckelmann published his Gedanken über die Nachahmung der griechischen Werke in der Malerei und Bildhauerkunst ("Thoughts on the Imitation of Greek Works in Painting and Sculpture"), followed by a feigned attack on the work and a defense of its principles, ostensibly by an impartial critic. The Gedanken contains the first statement of the doctrines he afterwards developed, the ideal of "noble simplicity and quiet grandeur" (edle Einfalt und stille Größe) and the definitive assertion, "[t]he one way for us to become great, perhaps inimitable, is by imitating the ancients". As art historian John Harry North notes, Winckelmann held that "the recovery of classical aesthetic values by imitation and admiration should be at the core of the education of artists."

The work won warm admiration not only for the ideas it contained, but for its literary style. It made Winckelmann famous, and was reprinted several times and soon translated into French. In England, Winckelmann's views stirred discussion in the 1760s and 1770s, although it was limited to artistic circles: Henry Fuseli's English translation, entitled Reflections on the Painting and Sculpture of the Greeks, was published in 1765, and reprinted with corrections in 1767.

=== Rome ===
In 1751, the papal nuncio in Saxony, Alberico Archinto, visited Nöthnitz and was highly impressed by Winckelmann. In 1754 Winckelmann converted to the Roman Catholic Church. Goethe concluded that Winckelmann was a pagan, while Gerhard Gietmann contended that Winckelmann "died a devout and sincere Catholic"; either way, his conversion ultimately opened the doors of the papal library to him. On the strength of the Gedanken über die Nachahmung der Griechischen Werke, Augustus III, king of Poland and elector of Saxony, granted him a pension of 200 thalers, so that he could continue his studies in Rome.

Winckelmann arrived in Rome in November 1755. His first task there was to describe the statues in the Cortile del Belvedere—the Apollo Belvedere, the Laocoön, the so-called Antinous, and the Belvedere Torso—which represented to him the "utmost perfection of ancient sculpture".

Originally, Winckelmann planned to stay in Italy only two years with the help of the grant from Dresden, but the outbreak of the Seven Years' War (1756–1763) changed his plans. He was named librarian to Cardinal Passionei, who was impressed by Winckelmann's beautiful Greek writing and showed him much kindness. Winckelmann also became librarian to Alberico Archinto, who had returned to Rome and become Cardinal Archinto. After the deaths of the two cardinals, Winckelmann was hired as librarian in the house of Alessandro Cardinal Albani, who was forming his magnificent collection of antiquities in the villa at Porta Salaria.

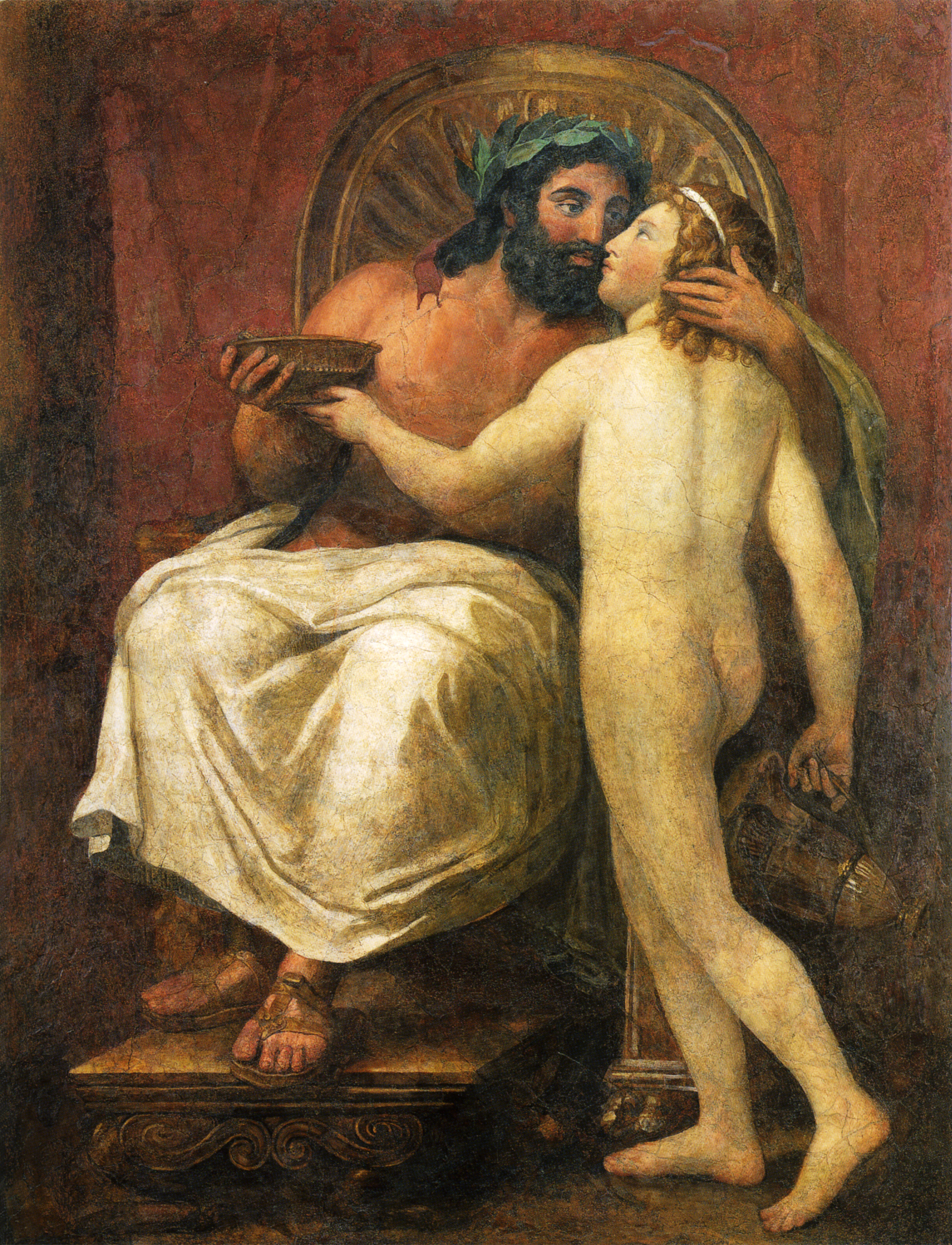
The notorious fake antique fresco of Jupiter and Ganymede, tailored to deceive Winckelmann, has been attributed to Mengs or Giovanni Casanova.

With the aid of his new friend, the painter Anton Raphael Mengs (1728–79), with whom he first lived in Rome, Winckelmann devoted himself to the study of Roman antiquities and gradually acquired an unrivalled knowledge of ancient art. Winckelmann's method of careful observation allowed him to identify Roman copies of Greek art, something that was unusual at that time—Roman culture was considered the ultimate achievement of Antiquity. His friend Mengs became the channel through which Winckelmann's ideas were realized in art and spread around Europe. ("The only way for us to become great, yes, inimitable, if it is possible, is the imitation of the Greeks", Winckelmann declared in the Gedanken. With imitation he did not mean slavish copying: "... what is imitated, if handled with reason, may assume another nature, as it were, and become one's own"). Neoclassical artists attempted to revive the spirit as well as the forms of ancient Greece and Rome. Mengs's contribution in this was considerable—he was widely regarded as the greatest living painter of his day. The French painter Jacques-Louis David met Mengs in Rome (1775–80) and was introduced through him to the artistic theories of Winckelmann. Earlier, while in Rome, Winckelmann met the Scottish architect Robert Adam, whom he influenced to become a leading proponent of neoclassicism in architecture. Winckelmann's ideals were later popularized in England through the reproductions of Josiah Wedgwood's "Etruria" factory (1782).

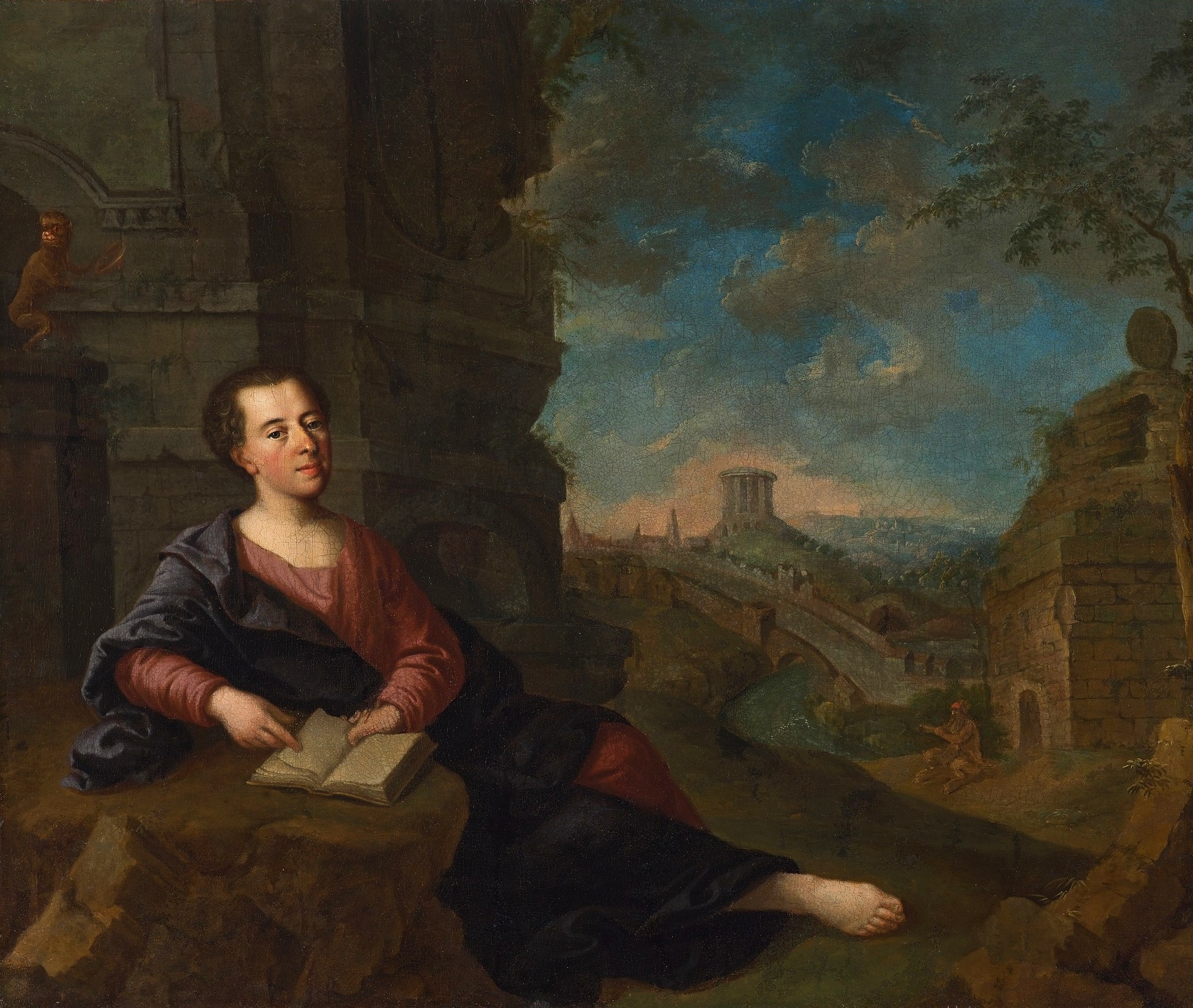
Portrait of Johann Joachim Winckelmann against classical landscape, after 1760 (Royal Castle in Warsaw)

In 1760, Winckelmann's Description des pierres gravées du feu Baron de Stosch [Description of incised gems of the late Baron of Stosch] appeared, followed in 1762 by his Anmerkungen über die Baukunst der Alten ("Observations on the Architecture of the Ancients"), which included an account of the temples at Paestum. In 1758 and 1762, he visited Naples to observe the archaeological excavations being conducted at Pompeii and Herculaneum. "Despite his association with Albani, Winckelmann steered clear of the shady world of art dealing which had compromised the scholarly respectability of such brilliant, if much less systematic antiquarians as Francesco Ficoroni and the Baron Stosch." Winckelmann's poverty may have played a part: the trade in antiquities was an expensive and speculative game. In 1763, with Albani's advocacy, he was appointed Pope Clement XIII's Prefect of Antiquities.

From 1763, while retaining his position with Albani, Winckelmann worked as a prefect of antiquities (Prefetto delle Antichità) and scriptor (Scriptor linguae teutonicae) of the Vatican. Winckelmann visited Naples again, in 1765 and 1767, and wrote for the use of the electoral prince and princess of Saxony his Briefe an Bianconi, which were published, eleven years after his death, in the Antologia romana.

Winckelmann contributed various essays to the Bibliothek der schönen Wissenschaften; and, in 1766, published his Versuch einer Allegorie. Of much greater importance was the work entitled Monumenti antichi inediti ("Unpublished monuments of antiquity", 1767–1768), prefaced by a Trattato preliminare, which presented a general sketch of the history of art. The plates in this work are representations of objects which had either been falsely explained or not explained at all. Winckelmann's explanations were of tremendous use to the future science of archaeology, by showing through observational method that the ultimate sources of inspiration of many works of art supposed to be connected with Roman history were to be found in Homer.

=== Masterwork ===
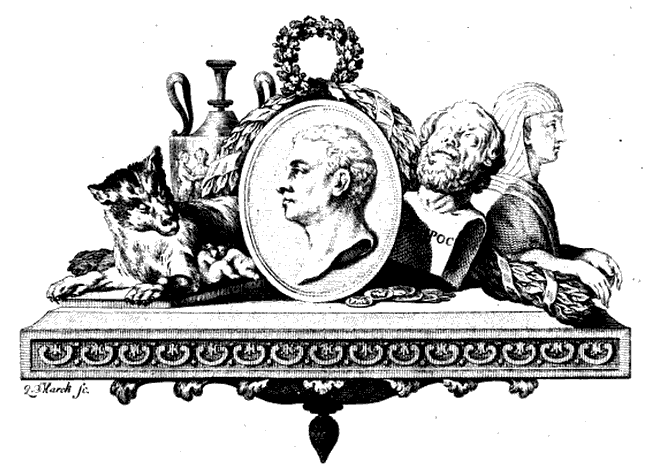
Figurehead from the title page of Geschichte der Kunst des Alterhums Vol. 1 (1776). Winckelmann is center, surrounded by Homer and Romulus and Remus with the She-wolf in the foreground, and the Sphinx and an Etruscan vase in the background.

Winckelmann's masterpiece, the Geschichte der Kunst des Alterthums ("The History of Art in Antiquity"), published in 1764, was soon recognized as a permanent contribution to European literature. In this work, "Winckelmann's most significant and lasting achievement was to produce a thorough, comprehensive and lucid chronological account of all antique art—including that of the Egyptians and Etruscans." This was the first work to define in the art of a civilization an organic growth, maturity, and decline. Here, it included the revelatory tale told by a civilization's art and artifacts—these, if we look closely, tell us their own story of cultural factors, such as climate, freedom, and craft. Winckelmann sets forth both the history of Greek art and of Greece. He presents a glowing picture of the political, social, and intellectual conditions which he believed tended to foster creative activity in ancient Greece.

The fundamental idea of Winckelmann's artistic theories are that the goal of art is beauty, and that this goal can be attained only when individual and characteristic features are strictly subordinated to an artist's general scheme. The true artist, selecting from nature the phenomena suited to his purpose and combining them through the exercise of his imagination, creates an ideal type in which normal proportions are maintained, and particular parts, such as muscles and veins, are not permitted to break the harmony of the general outlines.

=== Death ===
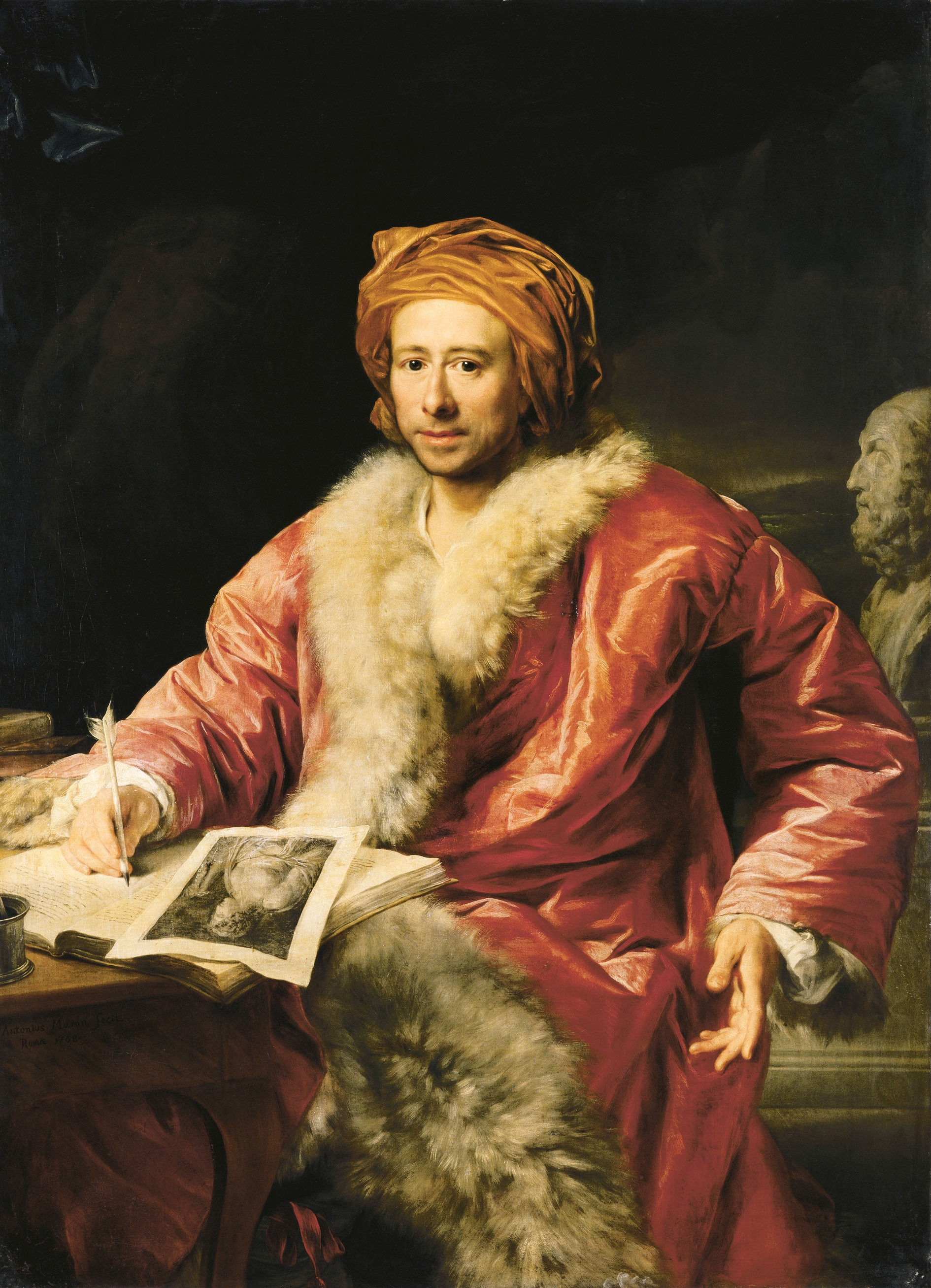
Portrait of Winckelmann by Anton von Maron, 1768: an engraving of an Antinous lies before him (Schlossmuseum Weimar)

In April 1768, Winckelmann set out on a journey north over the Alps with his friend, the sculptor and restorer Bartolomeo Cavaceppi. Upon reaching Tyrol, he experienced severe depression and wished to return to Italy immediately, but Cavaceppi persuaded him to continue to Munich and Vienna, where he was received with honor by Empress Maria Theresa, who awarded him several gold and silver medals.

On his way back, while waiting in Trieste for a ship to Ancona, Winckelmann was murdered on 8 June 1768 in his hotel room by a fellow traveller, a man named Francesco Arcangeli, an unemployed cook and convicted thief. Arcangeli attempted to rob Winckelmann after Winckelmann showed him his valuable Maria Theresa medals; during the violent struggle, Arcangeli strangled and stabbed him. Arcangeli fled without the coins when the hotel was alerted, but he was apprehended, tried, and executed later that month.

Winckelmann was buried in the churchyard of Trieste Cathedral. Official records of the investigation and trial—documented by Domenico Rossetti De Scander and Cesare Pagnini as the Mordakte Winckelmann (later translated into German by Heinrich Alexander Stoll)—confirm that attempted robbery was the primary motive, dispelling contemporary rumors of political or personal conspiracies.

== Critical response and influence ==
Winckelmann's writings are key to understanding the modern European discovery of ancient (sometimes idealized) Greece, neoclassicism, and the doctrine of art as imitation (Nachahmung). The mimetic character of art that imitates but does not simply copy, as Winckelmann restated it, is central to any interpretation of Enlightenment classical idealism. Winckelmann stands at an early stage of the transformation of taste in the late 18th century.

Winckelmann's study Sendschreiben von den Herculanischen Entdeckungen ("Letter about the Discoveries at Herculaneum") was published in 1762, and two years later Nachrichten von den neuesten Herculanischen Entdeckungen ("Report on the Latest Discoveries at Herculaneum"). From these, scholars obtained their first real information about the excavations at Pompeii.

His major work, Geschichte der Kunst des Alterthums (1764, "The History of Ancient Art"), deeply influenced contemporary views of the superiority of Greek art. It was translated into French in 1766 and later into English and Italian. Among others, Gotthold Ephraim Lessing based many of the ideas in his Laocoön (1766) on Winckelmann's views on harmony and expression in the visual arts.

In the historical portions of his writings, Winckelmann used not only the works of art he himself had studied but the scattered notices on the subject to be found in ancient writers; and his wide knowledge and active imagination enabled him to offer many fruitful suggestions as to periods about which he had little direct information. To the still existing works of art, he applied a minute empirical scrutiny. Many of his conclusions, based on inadequate evidence of Roman copies, would be modified or reversed by subsequent researchers. Nonetheless, the fervid descriptive enthusiasm of passages in his work, its strong and yet graceful style, and its vivid descriptions of works of art gave it a most immediate appeal. It marked an epoch by indicating the spirit in which the study of Greek art and of ancient civilization should be approached, and the methods by which investigators might hope to attain solid results. To Winckelmann's contemporaries it came as a revelation, and it exercised a profound influence on the best minds of the age. It was read with intense interest by Lessing, who found in the earliest of Winckelmann's works the starting-point for his Laocoön, and by Herder, Goethe and Kant.

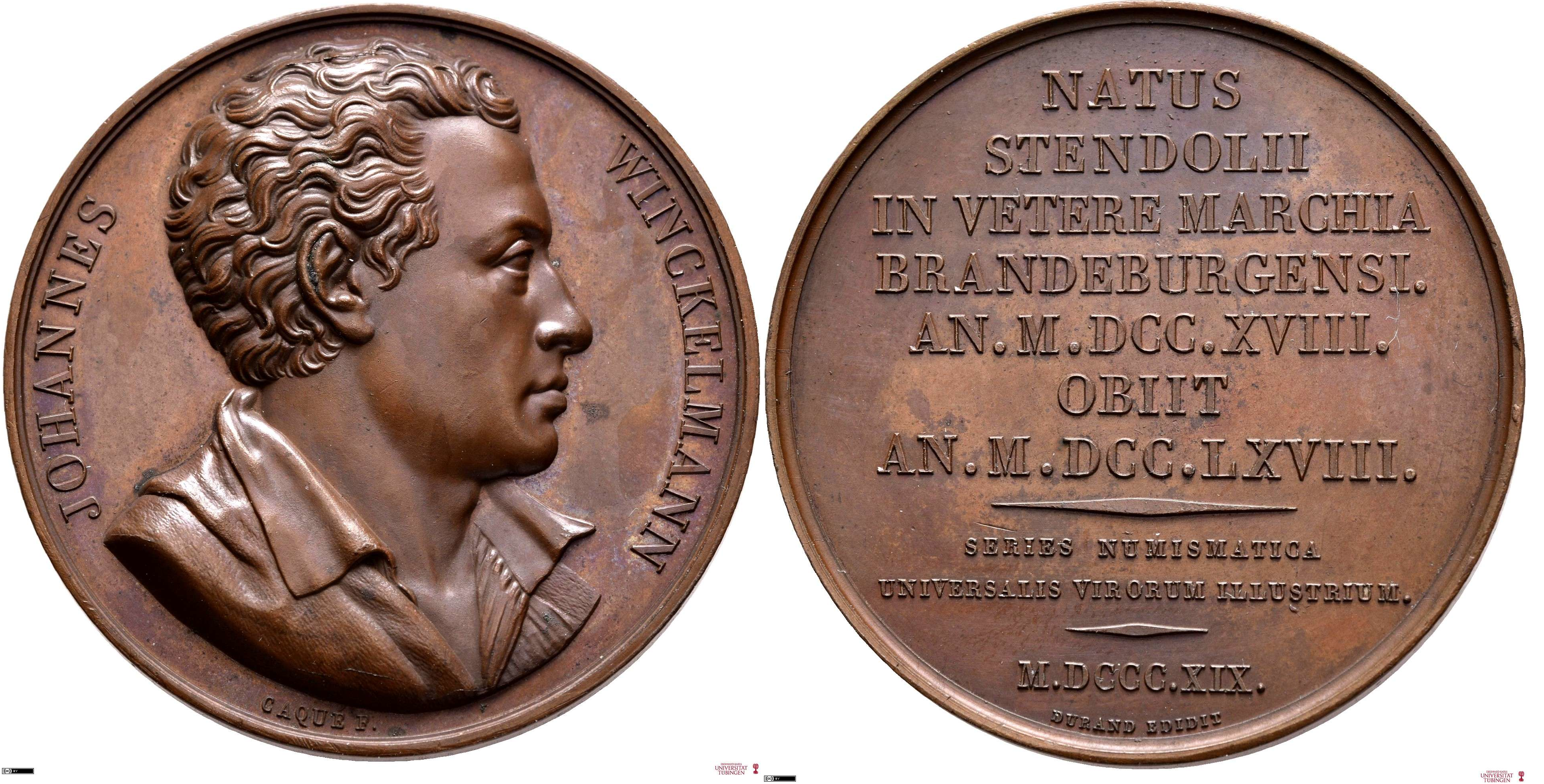
Medal Johann Joachim Winckelmann 1819

Winckelmann's historical standing is best illustrated by the countless honors he received after his death. One of these is a medal published in a French medal series for illustrious men struck in 1819.

Today, Humboldt University of Berlin's Winckelmann Institute is dedicated to the study of classical archaeology.

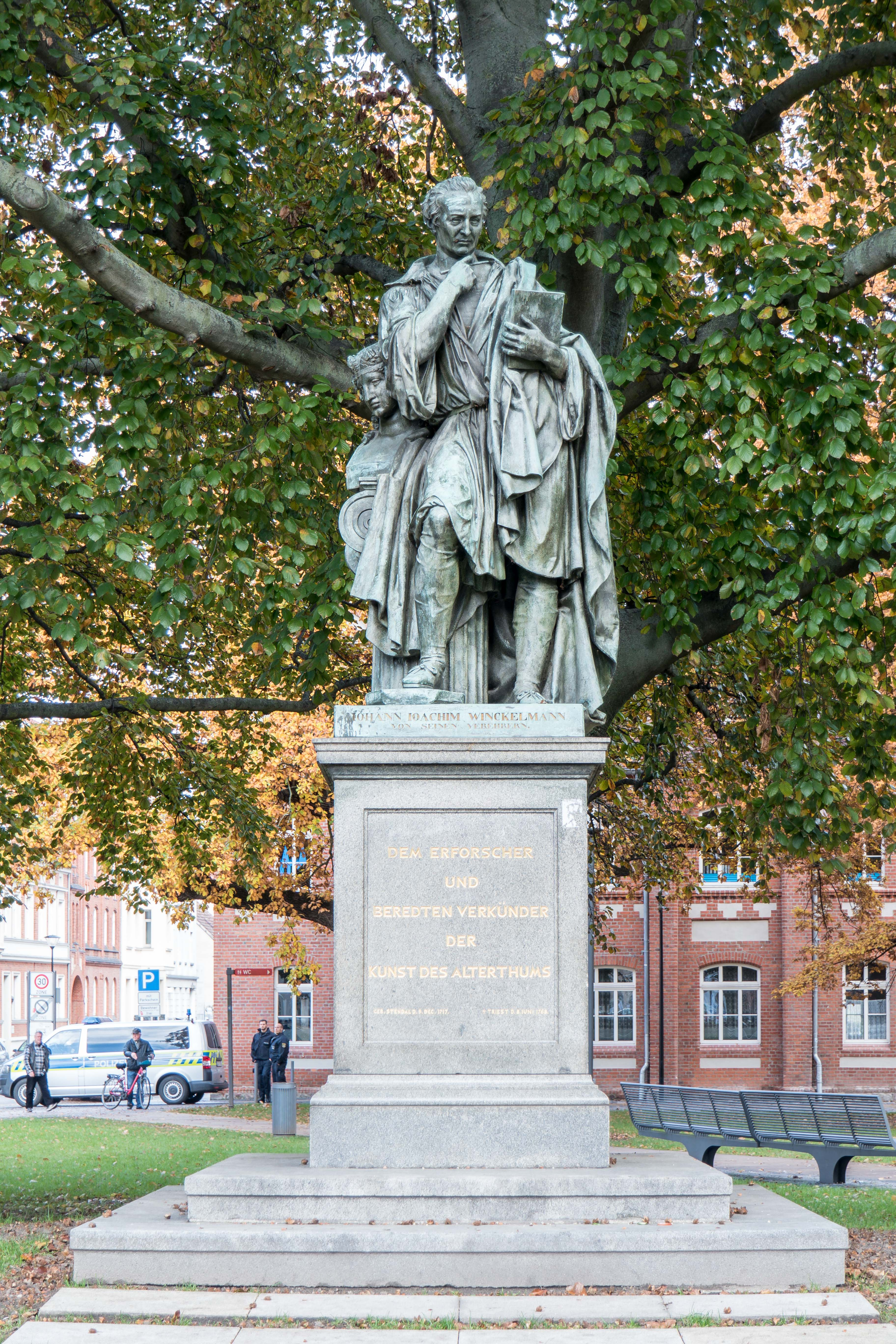
Winckelmann statue, Winckelmannplatz, Stendal, Germany

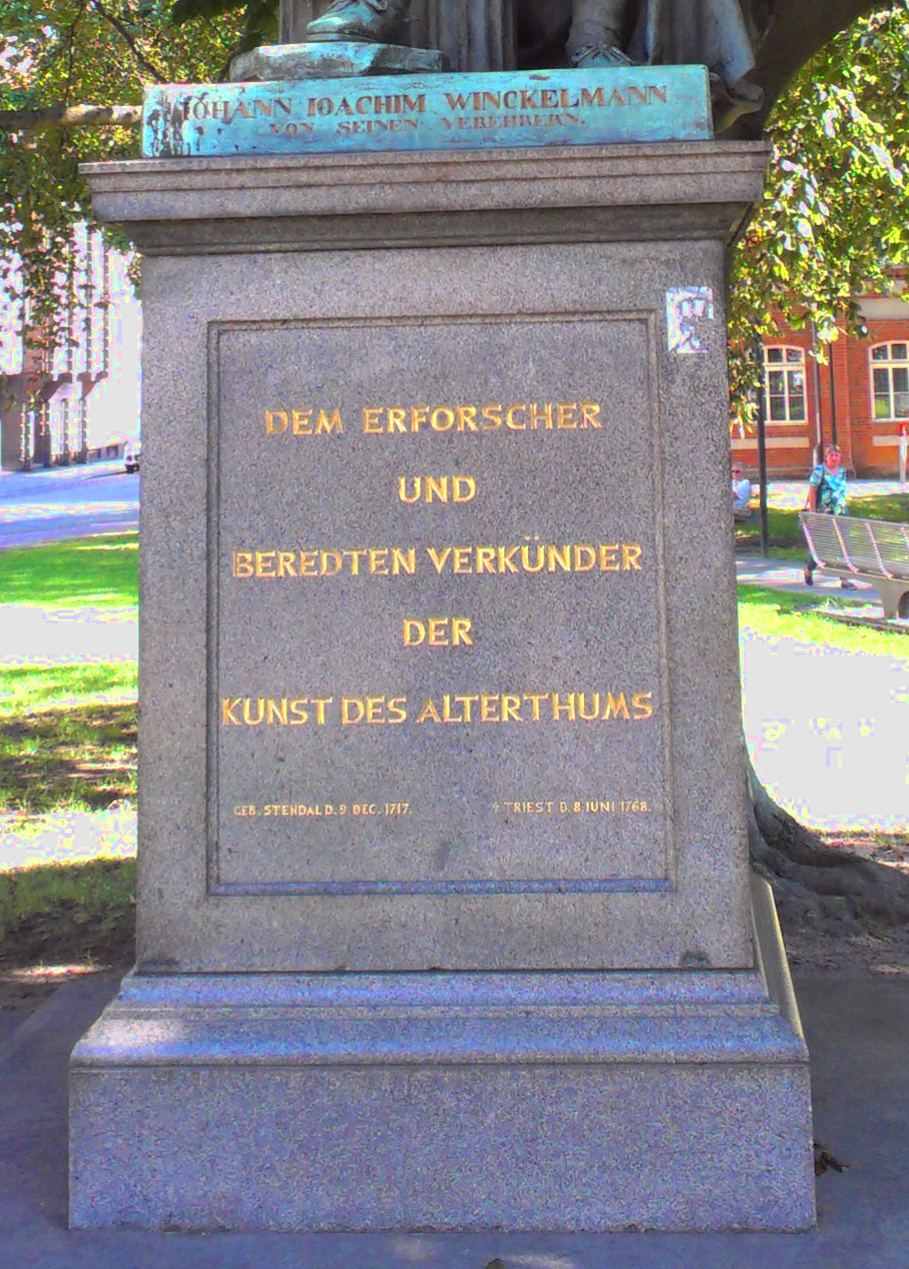
Pedestal of Winckelmann statue, Winckelmannplatz, Stendal, Germany

== Works ==
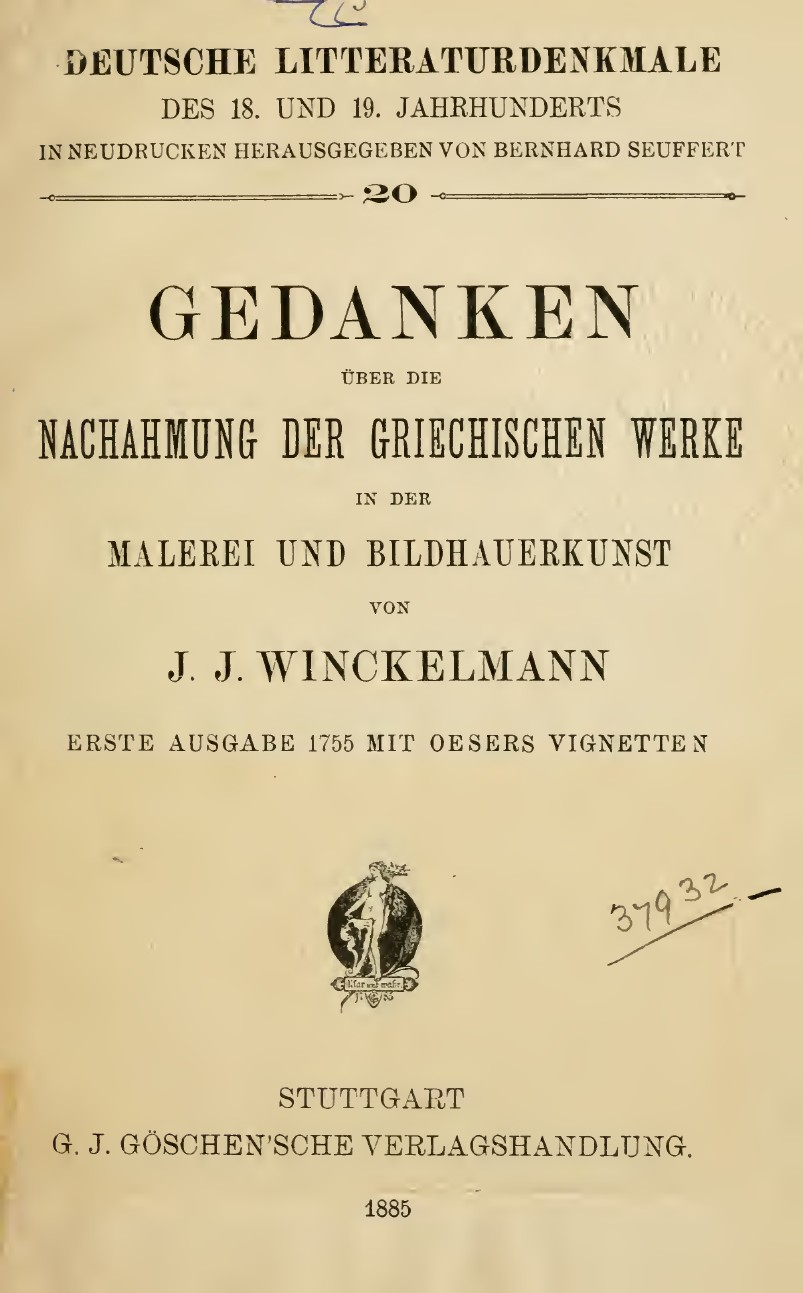
Gedanken über die nachahmung der griechischen Werke in der Malerei und Bildhauerkunst (1885)

The most accessible editions of selected works, in condensed forms, are David Irwin, Winckelmann: Selected Writings on Art (London: Phaidon) 1972, and David Carter, Johann Joachim Winckelmann on Art, Architecture, and Archaeology (Camden House) 2013, and the critical edition is Walther Rehm and Hellmut Sichtermann, eds., Kleine Schriften, Vorreden, Entwürfe (Berlin), 1968.

1. Gedanken über die Nachahmung der griechischen Werke in der Malerei und Bildhauerkunst ("Thoughts on the Imitation of Greek Works in Painting and Sculpture"), followed by a feigned attack on the work, and a defence of its principles, nominally by an impartial critic. (First edition of only 50 copies 1755, 2nd ed. 1756)
2. Description des pierres gravées du feu Baron de Stosch (1760).
3. Anmerkungen über die Baukunst der Alten ("Remarks on the Architecture of the Ancients"), including an account of the temples at Paestum (1762)
4. Sendschreiben von den Herculanischen Entdeckungen ("Letter About the Discoveries at Herculaneum") (1762).
5. ("Essay on the Beautiful in Art") (1763), an epistolary essay addressed to Friedrich Rudolph von Berg.
6. "Nachrichten von den neuesten Herculanischen Entdeckungen" ("Report About the Latest Herculanean Discoveries") (1764).
7. Geschichte der Kunst des Alterthums ("History of Ancient Art") (1764).
8. Versuch einer Allegorie ("Attempt at an Allegory") (1766), which, although containing the results of much thought and reading, is not conceived in a thoroughly critical spirit.
9. Monumenti antichi inediti (1767–1768), prefaced by a Trattato preliminare, presenting a general sketch of the history of art. The plates in this work are representations of objects which had either been falsely explained or not explained at all.
10. Briefe an Bianconi ("Letters to Bianconi"), which were published eleven years after his death, in the Antologia Romana.

== Cited sources ==
- Boorstin, Daniel J. (1983). The Discoverers. New York: Random House. ISBN 978-0-394-72625-0.
