= Ficoroni Cista =

4th Century BC jewelry box

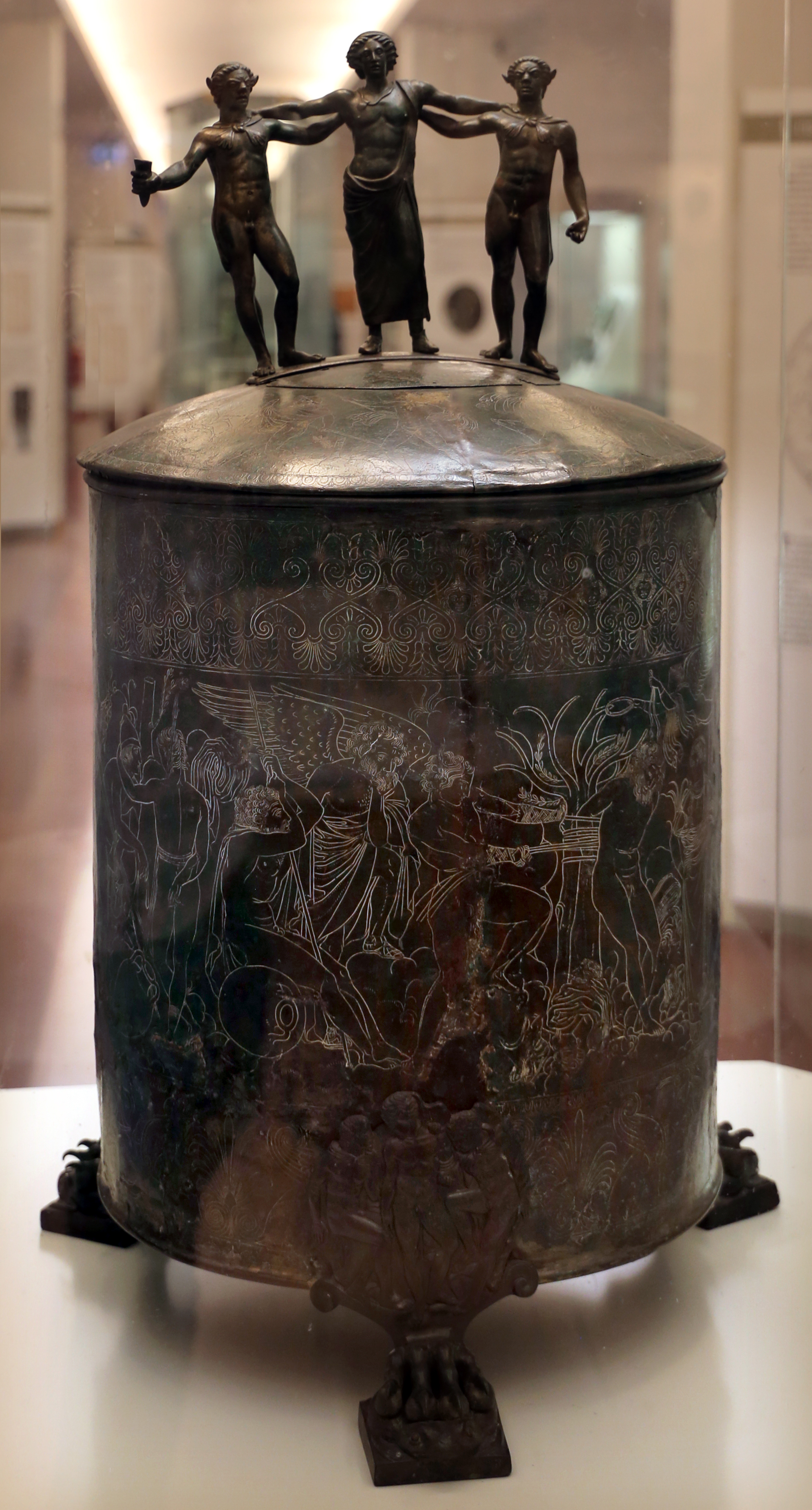
- Material: Bronze
- Size: 74 cm (29 in) high; 35 cm (14 in) diameter
- Writing: Old Latin: DINDIA MACOLNIA FILEAI DEDIT NOVIOS PLAUTIOS MED ROMAI FECID
- Created: 4th century BC
- Discovered: 1738; Location disputed, alleged to be in a tomb, Palestrina, Italy
- Discovered by: Francesco Ficoroni
- Present location: National Etruscan Museum, Rome, Italy
- Culture: Italic civilization

The Ficoroni Cista is a finely chiseled bronze cylindrical jewelry box dating to the second half of the 4th century BC. One of the best examples of Italic engraved bronzework, the Ficoroni Cista has been made the subject of several monographs. It is the earliest surviving work of Roman art owned and commissioned by a woman.

== History and dating ==
The cista was discovered in 1738 in an ancient necropolis in Palestrina, about 21 miles (35 km) east of Rome, by the archeologist Francesco Ficoroni. Along with the cista, Ficoroni found the so-called Praenestine mirror, now in the National Etruscan Museum of Rome, which depicts the same mythological scene as that on the cista. Ficoroni donated the cista to the Kircherian Museum and in 1913 the artifact was transferred to the collection of the National Etruscan Museum in Rome, where it is still today.

The inscription on the Ficoroni Cista

An Old Latin inscription on the lid reveals that the cista was commissioned by Dindia Macolnia, a distinguished noblewoman of Praeneste, with the aim of giving it to her daughter as a present (probably as a wedding-present). The inscription also relates the name of the craftsman, Novios Plautios.

The artist's name seems to indicate a Campanian origin, although his workshop was located in Rome, as evidenced by the inscription. The fact that he found it useful to move to Rome is significant in itself as showing the rise of an adequate financial demand in the city for luxuries. According to Mommsen, Plautius was an artisan who was granted a place in the noble Plautia gens as a former slave or client. The manufacture of the cista is dated between c. 350 and 330 BC.

== Description ==
The cylindrical cista is 74 cm high and 35 in diameter. It is decorated with fine engravings on the body and lid, with applied cast bronze parts, such as the three claw-type feet, decorated in relief with representations of Hercules between Iolaus and Eros. Of the three feet, two are original, one an antique copy: they consist of claws resting on frogs. One foot bears the inscription MAQOOULNA, the purchaser's name. Three bronze statuettes, connected by outstretched arms, decorate the top of the lid and serve as handles.

These separate and somewhat different parts point to a mechanical process of manufacture; the engraving, casting, and montage of the parts was carried out independently by different workmen. This explains why the plaquettes fastening the feet in place or forming part of the handle sometimes overlap the decoration or frieze, and why the engraved and applied parts are rarely in the same style or equivalent in their quality.

== Lid ==
The lid is decorated with three concentric friezes: a decorative floral motif in the center, two scenes of an animal assaulted by a lion and a griffin in the middle band, and a hunting scene on the outer band, probably representing the mythological Calydonian boar hunt. The frieze on the lid with its combats of animals has affinities with the François Tomb paintings and with sarcophagi from Tarquinia and Praeneste, giving a date within the third quarter of the fourth century BC. The lid supports three small bronze figures, which serve as a handle, representing Dionysus and two satyrs.

The lid of the Ficoroni Cista
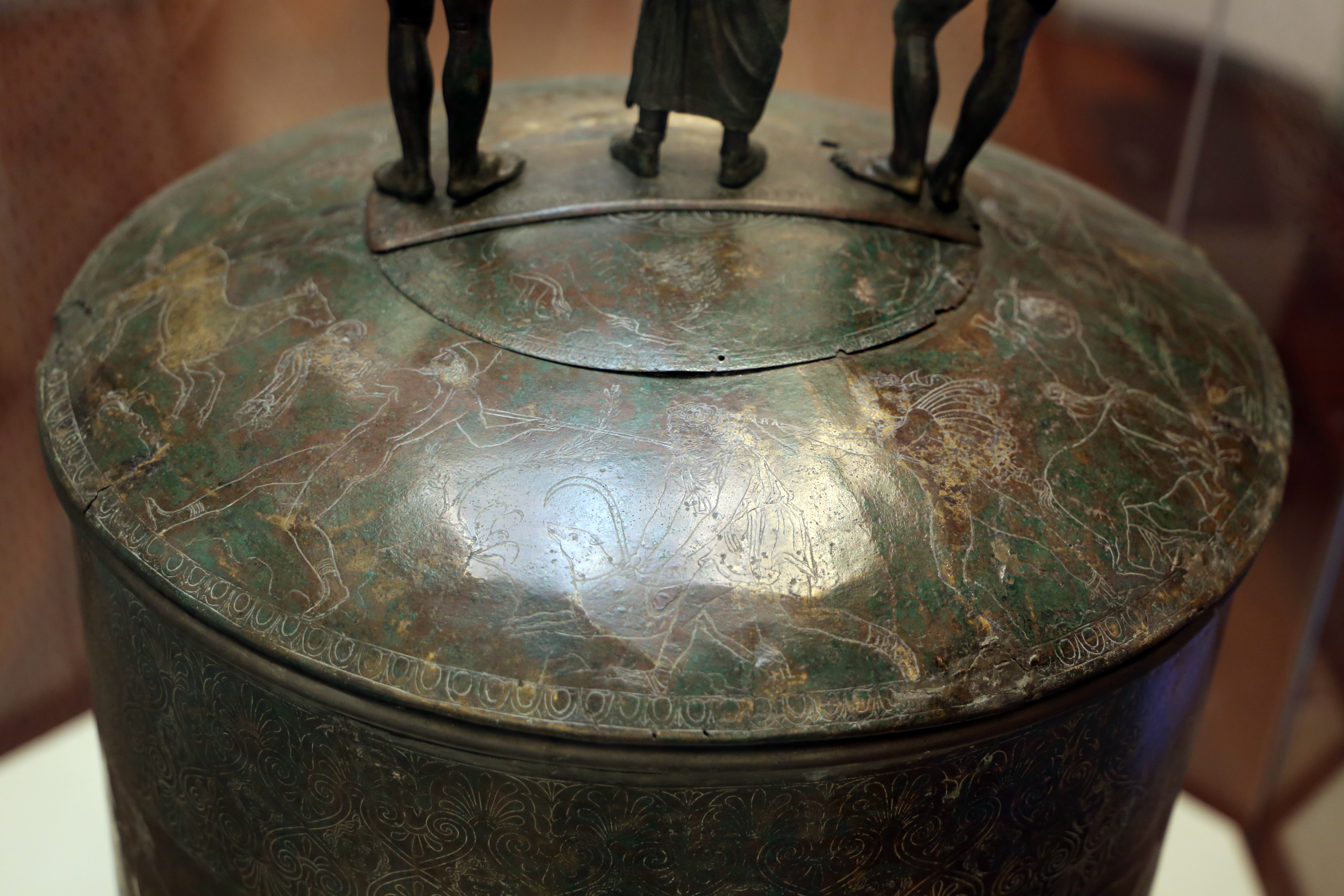
The back of the lid.

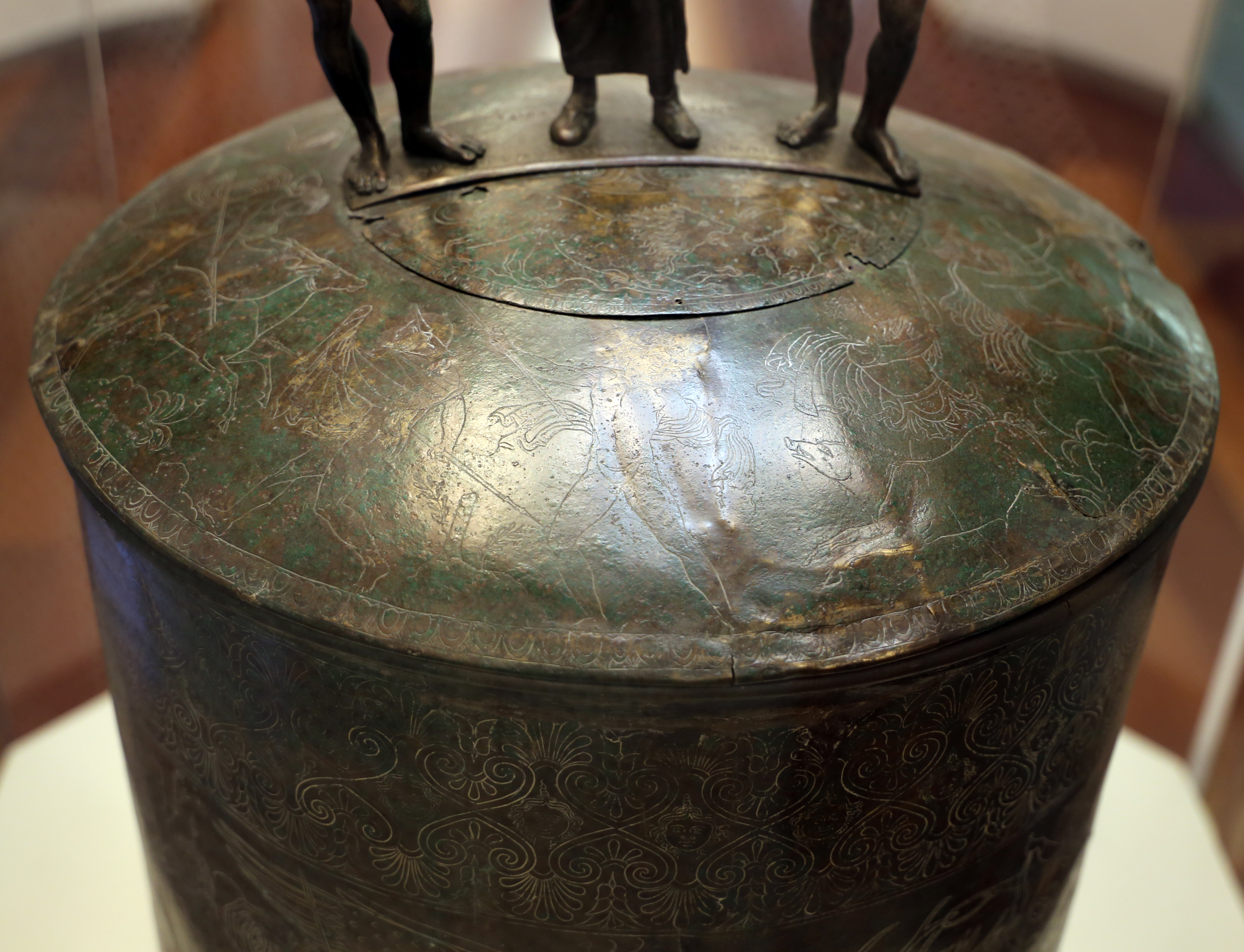
The front of the lid.

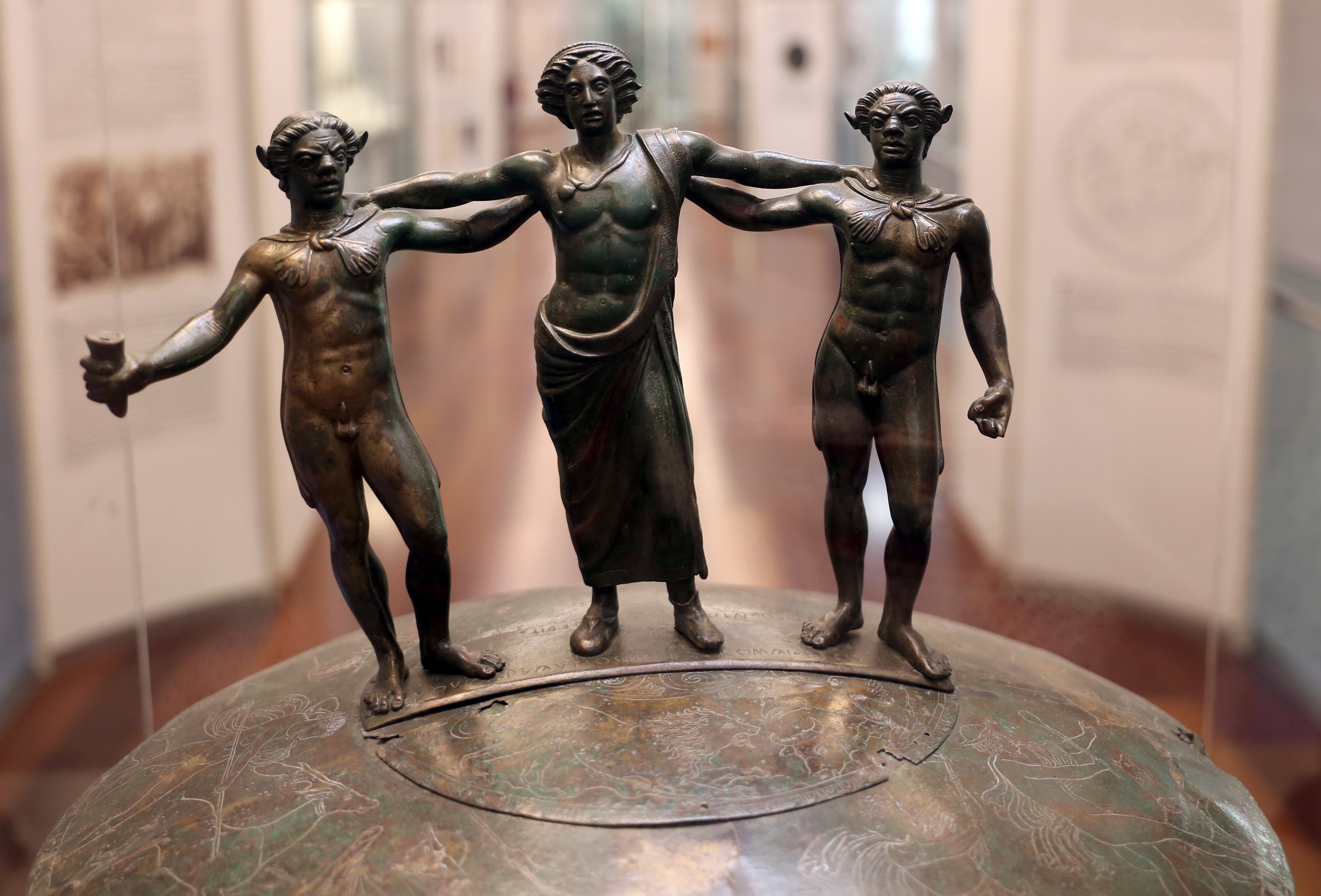
The bronze statuettes serving as a handle.

== Body ==
The engravings on the body are arranged in a large central band, with mythological figures, and two high decorative bands at the edges: the upper one with a double series (straight and inverted) of palmettes and lotus flowers framing a small Gorgon's head (gorgoneion); the lower one features sphinxes alternating with palmettes and lotus flowers, with a double border, one with a Lesbic Kyma and one with an egg-and-dart.

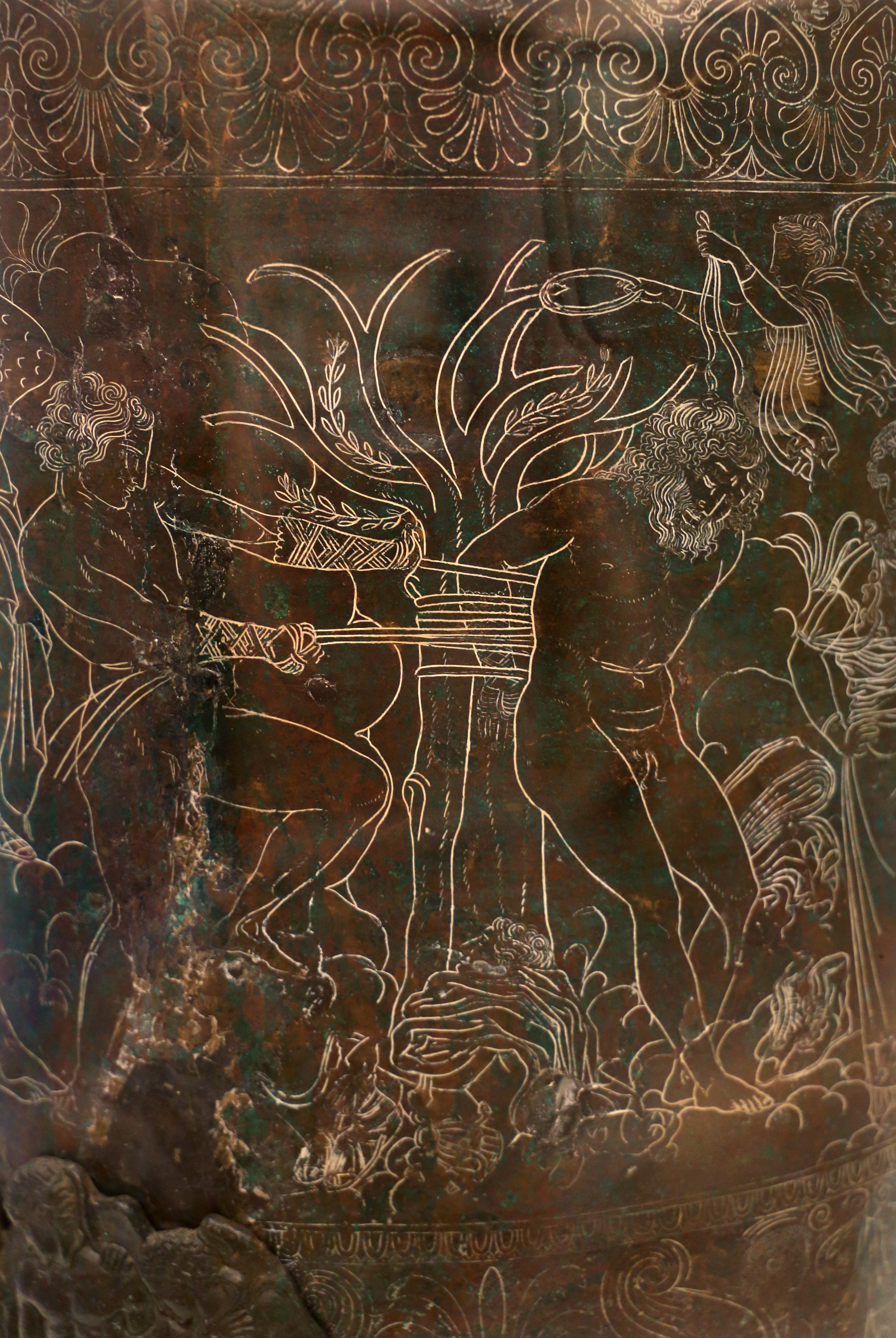
Pollux tying Amykos to a tree. Detail from the Ficoroni Cista

The mythological scene in the central band depicts the Argonauts visiting the land of the Bebryces (a people of Bithynia). The Argonauts, having landed in search of supplies, are challenged by the giant Amykos, son of Poseidon and king of the Bebryces, who forced all strangers landing on his shores to fight him. The giant, however, is defeated in a boxing match by Pollux, son of Zeus and twin brother of Castor, who, while sparing his life, makes him promise to respect anyone who lands on the island from now on.

The entire composition consists of three scenes, not closely connected, but all occupying the same rocky landscape.

The first scene shows Pollux tying Amykos to a tree in the presence of Athena, Boreas, and three companions armed with spears. A small Victory flies overhead toward the victor, bringing fillets and a wreath, and a small slave in a mantle, laden with boxers' gear, crouches at the foot of the tree. To the right and left, two pairs of spectators form a backdrop to the scene. The sense of spatiality is also notable, thanks to the different positions of the figures at the sides (one seated in profile, one standing three-quarters to the left, one seated and one standing with their backs turned to the right), among whom are perhaps the winged demon Sosthenes and Amykos' brother Mygdon, king of Phrygia.

The second section shows several Argonauts drinking at a fountain. Castor is recognizable by his characteristic close-fitting cap, the pileus, and a male figure reclines on the rocks above, perhaps the personification or genius of the place. Various amphorae lie on the ground, some depicted in foreshortening with remarkable virtuosity.

The third section shows the prow of the Argo, where three Argonauts are standing, while a fourth comes ashore with a basket and a barrel, and a fifth is sitting nearby.

The engravings on the cista are of extremely high quality. The artist has mastered the expressive resources of Classical elegance in his drawing, in the freedom and fluidity of his foreshortenings, and in his linear translations of coloristic and pictorial motifs such as the masses of hair, modeled in delicate detail.

According to some scholars, the engravings on the Ficoroni Cista are a reproduction of a lost fifth-century painting by the ancient Greek painter and sculptor Micon. However, there are striking differences between Pausanias’ description of such a painting and the mythological engravings on the cista. According to Hopkins, the scene may derive from the lost late fifth-century comedy Amykos, by the Sicilian playwright, Epicharmus of Kos.

== Bibliography ==
- Smith, William; Wayte, William (1890). "Cista". In William Smith; William Wayte; G. E. Marindin (eds.). A Dictionary of Greek and Roman Antiquities. Vol. 1. London: John Murray. pp. 439–441.
- Mansuelli, Guido Achille (1963). "NOVIOS PLAUTIOS". Enciclopedia dell'Arte Antica. Rome: Istituto dell'Enciclopedia Italiana.
- Dohrn, Tobias (1972). Die Ficoronische Ciste in der Villa Giulia in Rom. Berlin: Gebr. Mann.
- Bianchi Bandinelli, Ranuccio; Torelli, Mario (2000). El arte de la Antigüedad clásica. Vol. 2. Madrid: Ediciones Akal. pp. 284–5. ISBN 978-8446012016.
- Rebuffat-Emmanuel, Denise (1975). "À propos de la ciste Ficoroni". Revue Archéologique. 1 (1): 73–79. JSTOR 41744525.
- Grummond, Nancy Thomson de (2004). "For the Mother and for the Daughter: Some Thoughts on Dedications from Etruria and Praeneste". Hesperia Supplements. 33, ΧΑΡΙΣ: Essays in Honor of Sara A. Immerwahr: 351–370. JSTOR 1354077.
- Paggi, Maddalena (October 1, 2004). "The Praenestine Cistae". metmuseum.org. New York: Metropolitan Museum of Art.
- Elliott, John A. (2015). "Ficoroni Cista". In Nancy Thomson de Grummond (ed.). Encyclopedia of the History of Classical Archaeology. Routledge. p. 440. ISBN 9781134268610.
- Lecce, Vittoria (2021). "L'iscrizione della Cista Ficoroni". museoetru.it. Rome: National Etruscan Museum.
- Hopkins, John (2023). "Folding Meaning in an Object: The Ficoroni Cista and the Heterarchy of Art in Early Italy". In Jeremy Armstrong; Aaron Rhodes-Schroder (eds.). Adoption, Adaption, and Innovation in Pre-Roman Italy. Turnhout: Brepols. pp. 71–83. doi:10.1484/M.AMW-EB.5.133267. ISBN 978-2-503-60232-5.
