= Colonna, Lazio =

Colonna
- Comune
- Comune di Colonna
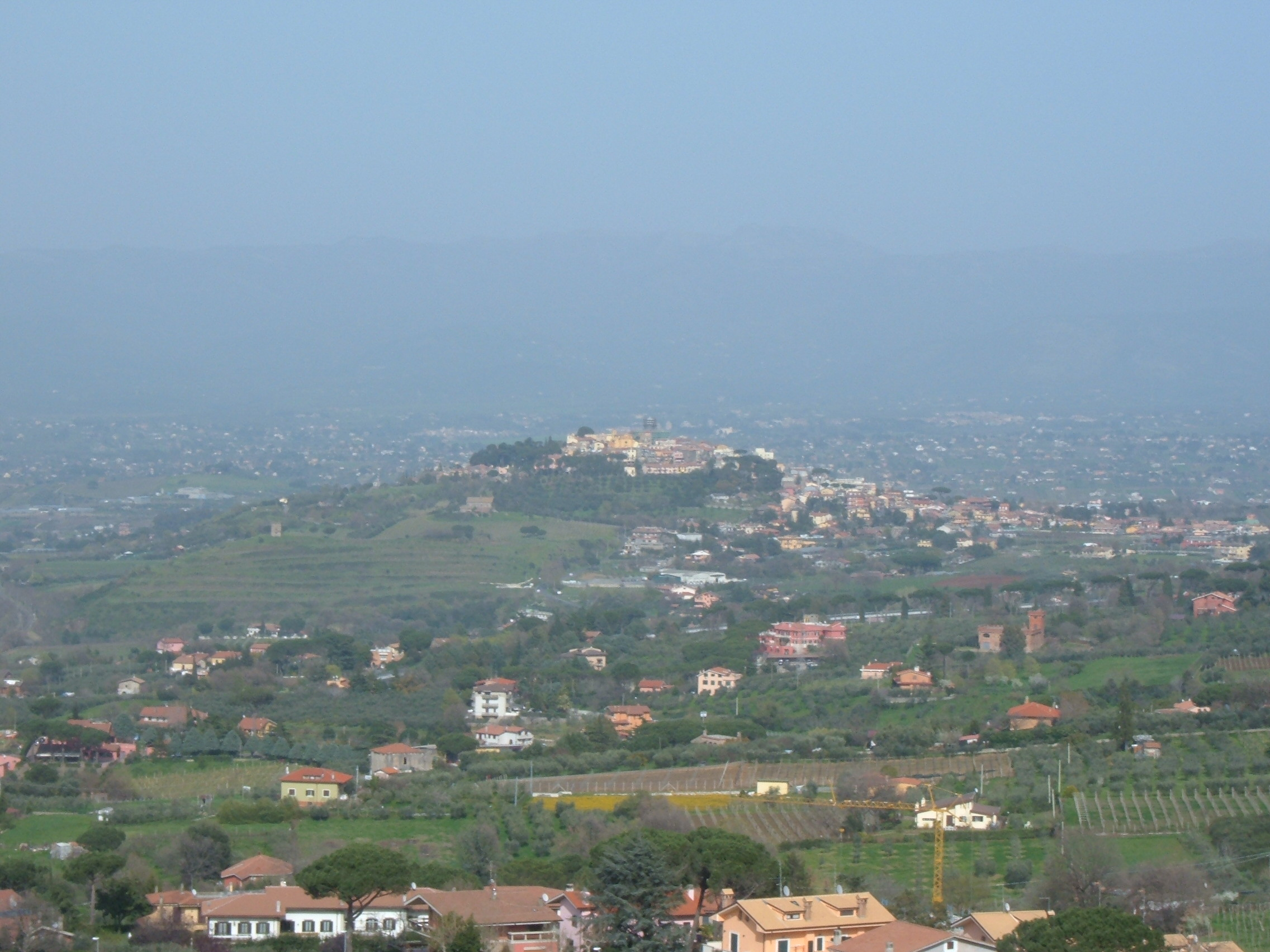
- View of Colonna, Lazio

- Coat of arms

- Location within Italy Location within Lazio
- Coordinates: 41°50′N 12°45′E
- Country: Italy
- Region: Lazio
- Metropolitan city: Rome (RM)

Government
  - Mayor: Fausto Giuliani

Area
  - Total: 3.5 km^{2} (1.4 sq mi)
- Elevation: 343 m (1,125 ft)

Population (31 August 2015)
  - Total: 4,290
  - Density: 1,200/km^{2} (3,200/sq mi)
- Demonym: Colonnesi
- Time zone: UTC+1 (CET)
  - Summer (DST): UTC+2 (CEST)
- Postal code: 00030
- Dialing code: 06
- Patron saint: St. Nicholas of Bari
- Website: Official website

Colonna is a comune (municipality) in the Metropolitan City of Rome in the Italian region of Latium, located about 20 kilometres (12 mi) southeast of Rome, on the Alban Hills. With a population of some 4,300, it is the smallest of the Castelli Romani.

== History ==
=== Ancient era ===
The territory of Colonna is believed to have included the ancient community of Labici, located in the area of the modern comune of Monte Compatri. Labici was conquered in 418 BC by the Romans under the dictator Quintus Servilius Priscus Structus Fidenas and razed to the ground. The Labicani then founded Labicum Quintanas near the Tower of the Pasolina near Colonna. The place is noted as Ad Quintanas, a station on the Via Labicana, between Rome and Ad Bivium.

=== Middle Ages ===
Labicum Quintanas became an episcopal see in the 4th century. The inhabited area began to decay and disappeared with the Gothic War (535–554).

Colonna is mentioned for the first time in 1047, in a deed of Henry III, Holy Roman Emperor, a guest at the castle, which had taken its name from a column of the ancient Labicum Quintanense, when he stopped there during his march that with his army to Naples along the Via Casilina.

In 1101 Peter, child of Gregory III, Count of Tusculum, received as inheritance the territory and the Castle of Columna, with Monte Porzio Catone, Monte Compatri and other surrounding possessions. Peter was the founder of Colonna family, which took the name from this property.

In 1298 Pope Boniface VIII ordered the destruction of Colonna and its castle as punishment against the Colonna family. With the advent of Pope Clement V (1305) the Colonna family resumed the fief with all of its territories.

=== Modern age ===
In 1662, the Colonna family sold the Castrum Columnae to Cardinal Ludovico Ludovisi. In 1710 the Ludovisi family sold it to the Rospigliosi-Pallavicini family.

The Rospigliosi-Pallavicini maintained the feudal dominion on Colonna up to 5 June 1848. In 1849 the Comune and the Municipality of Colonna was constituted.

== Main sights ==
The Baronial Palace (Italian: Palazzo Baronale) was built by the Colonna family in the 16th century on the site of the Roman castrum on the highest part on the hill. The main façade has an ashlar portal, while the opposite front has a double order of five arcades. The southwest side was modified when the church dedicated to Saint Nicholas was erected in the 18th century by the Pallavicini family.

== Culture ==
In the first Sunday of July, the Donkeys' Palio (Italian: Palio degli Asini) is held. The seven quarters of the town compete riding donkeys in medieval dress.

There's a museum at the former train station with vintage railway cars, a collection of photographs of the station's history, and a reconstruction of the stationmaster's office.

== Transportation ==
The commune is connected to Rome and southern Italy through the Via Casilina. It also has a station on the Rome–Cassino railway; the one on the Rome–Fiuggi narrow gauge railway is now abandoned, having been replaced by regional bus service operated by Cotral.

== Twin towns ==
- La Planche, France
