= Labico =

- Comune
- Comune di Labico
- Coat of arms

- Location within Italy Location within Lazio
- Coordinates: 41°47′N 12°53′E
- Country: Italy
- Region: Lazio
- Metropolitan city: Rome (RM)
- Frazioni: Colle Spina

Government
  - Mayor: Danilo Giovannoli

Area
  - Total: 11.75 km^{2} (4.54 sq mi)
- Elevation: 319 m (1,047 ft)

Population (30 October 2017)
  - Total: 6,469
  - Density: 550.6/km^{2} (1,426/sq mi)
- Demonym: Labicani
- Time zone: UTC+1 (CET)
  - Summer (DST): UTC+2 (CEST)
- Postal code: 00030
- Dialing code: 06
- Patron saint: St. Roch
- Saint day: August 16
- Website: Official website

Labico is a comune (municipality) of about 6,200 inhabitants in the Metropolitan City of Rome in the Italian region of Latium, located about 35 kilometres (22 mi) southeast of Rome.

Known as Lugnano until 1872, it takes its current name from the ancient Labicum, although it is more likely that the modern town was the location of Bolae, the city that fought Rome around the 5th century BC.
