= Publius Cornelius Cossus (consular tribune 415 BC) =

Roman Republican consular tribune in 415 BC

Publius Cornelius Cossus was a consular tribune of the Roman Republic in 415 BC.

Cornelius belonged to the Cornelia gens, one of the early Republics most influential patrician families which branch, the Cossi, rose to prominence during the late 5th century BC. Cornelius was the son of a Aulus Cornelius, possibly the quaestor Aulus Cornelius in 459, the famous Aulus Cornelius Cossus, consul in 428 BC, or another otherwise unattested Aulus Cornelius.

== Career ==
In 415 BC, Cornelius was elected as one of the Consular tribunes, his colleagues were Numerius Fabius Vibulanus, Gaius Valerius Potitus Volusus and Quintus Quinctius Cincinnatus. The actions of the consulars of this year is little known, but there was a proposal by the plebeian tribune Lucius Decius to colonize Bolae which was vetoed.

== See also ==
- Cornelia gens – Ancient Roman family

Political offices
Preceded by Aulus Sempronius Atratinus; Marcus Papirius Mugillanus; Quintus Fabius Vibulanus; Spurius Nautius Rutilus	Consular tribune of the Roman Republic with Numerius Fabius Vibulanus; Gaius Valerius Potitus Volusus; Quintus Quinctius Cincinnatus; 415 BC	Succeeded by Gnaeus Cornelius Cossus; Lucius Valerius Potitus; Quintus Fabius Vibulanus; Publius Postumius Albus Regillensis
