= Francesco Arcangeli =

Italian cook and criminal

- Born: 18 May 1737; Campiglio di Cireglio, Pistoia (Grand Duchy of Tuscany)
- Died: 20 July 1768 (aged 31); Trieste (Holy Roman Empire)
- Occupation: Cook
- Criminal charges: Murder
- Penalty: Breaking wheel

Details
- Victims: Johann Joachim Winckelmann
- Weapon: Knife

Francesco Arcangeli (18 May 1737 – 20 July 1768) was an Italian cook and criminal, the murderer of the famous art historian Johann Joachim Winckelmann (1717–1768).

== Biography ==
Francesco Ancangeli was born on 18 May 1737 in Campiglio di Cireglio, a hamlet of the municipality of Pistoia then in the Grand Duchy of Tuscany. He was a cook by profession and before the events of 1768 had been convicted of several crimes.

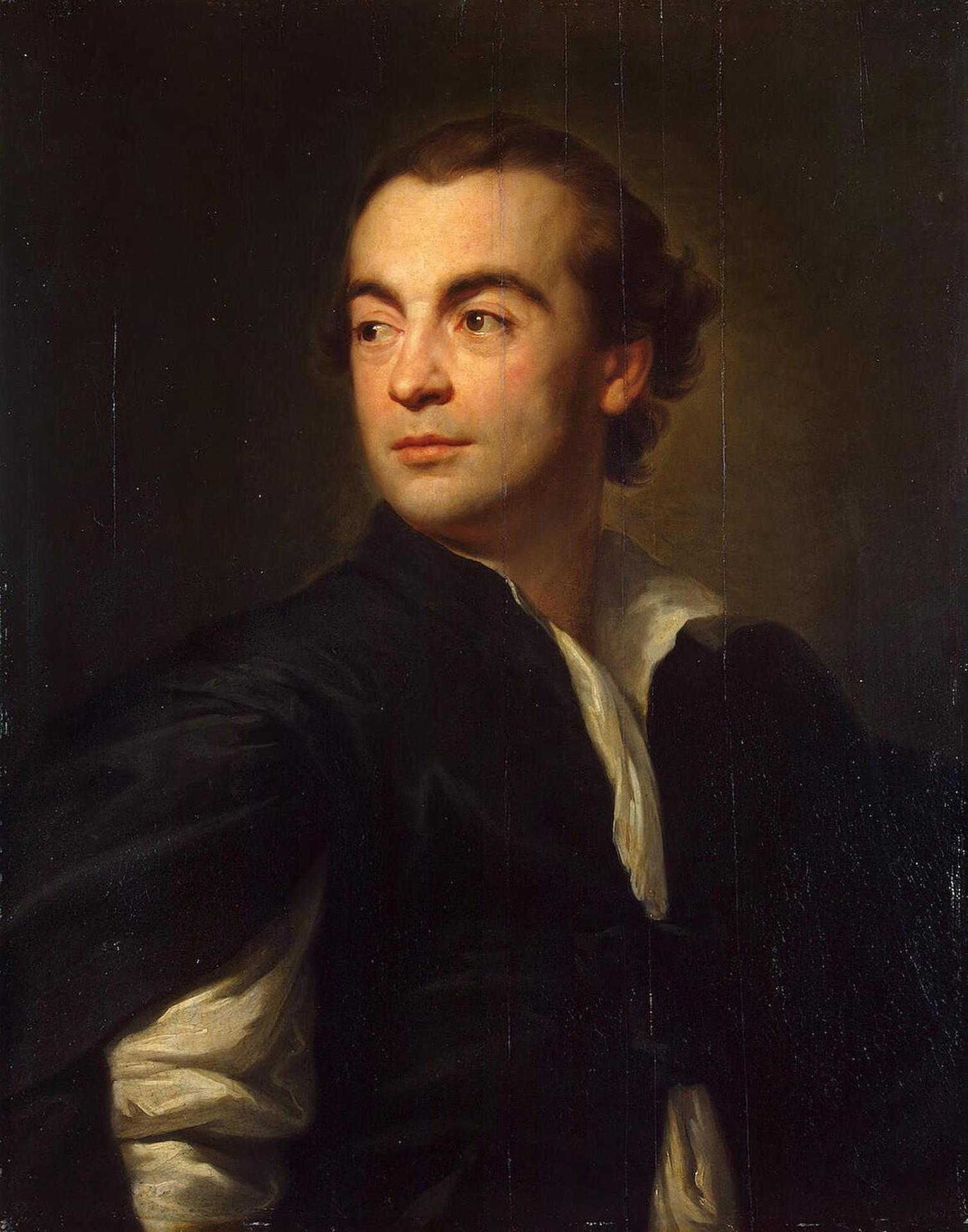
Winckelmann, by Anton Raphael Mengs (c. 1775).

=== Winckelmann's murder ===
Johann Joachim Winckelmann, the 50-year-old Prefect of Antiquities of Pope Clement XIII, was traveling to visit his native Germany after a 13-year absence, accompanied by his friend, the sculptor Bartolomeo Cavaceppi. In sight of the Tyrolian Alps, Winckelmann panicked and considered abandoning the journey. Cavaceppi convinced him to continue to Vienna, where Empress Maria Theresa received and honored him. Then Winckelmann, unable to abide the German atmosphere and desperate to return to Italy, returned alone to Rome, ignoring Cavaceppi's pleas that they continue north together. Wincklemann arrived in Trieste on 1 June 1768, traveling incognito and identifying himself as Signor Giovanni. In Trieste he lived at the Osteria Grande, the city's principal inn, now the Grand Hotel Duchi d'Aosta, as he waited for a ship bound for Ancona, whence he could travel overland to Rome.

At the Osteria Grande, Winckelmann met Francesco Arcangeli, an unemployed cook who was lodging in the room next to his. Arcangeli visited Winckelmann every evening in his room where Winckelmann showed him several gold and silver medals, including one Maria Theresa had recently awarded him. The two spent a lot of time together, eating, walking and talking, throughout the week following their meeting. On 7 June, Arcangeli accompanied Winckelmann to buy a pencil and a penknife. Arcangeli returned to the shop later that day to buy a knife. He bought some rope in another shop. On 8 June, he visited Winckelmann in his hotel room after dinner as was his custom. There he attacked and strangled Winckelmann, who pushed him away. Arcangeli pulled out his knife and they fought. Arcangeli later told authorities that he stabbed Winckelmann on the chest and also "lower down". Arcangeli then fled and Winckelmann screamed down the stairs: "Look what he did to me!".

Winckelmann spent his last hours doing his will and he forgave Arcangeli. He was buried the next day at the cemetery of the Trieste Cathedral. Arcangeli was arrested and sentenced to death on 18 July to be beaten alive on a wheel on the city's main square. The sentence was carried out two days later on 20 July.

=== Hypotheses ===
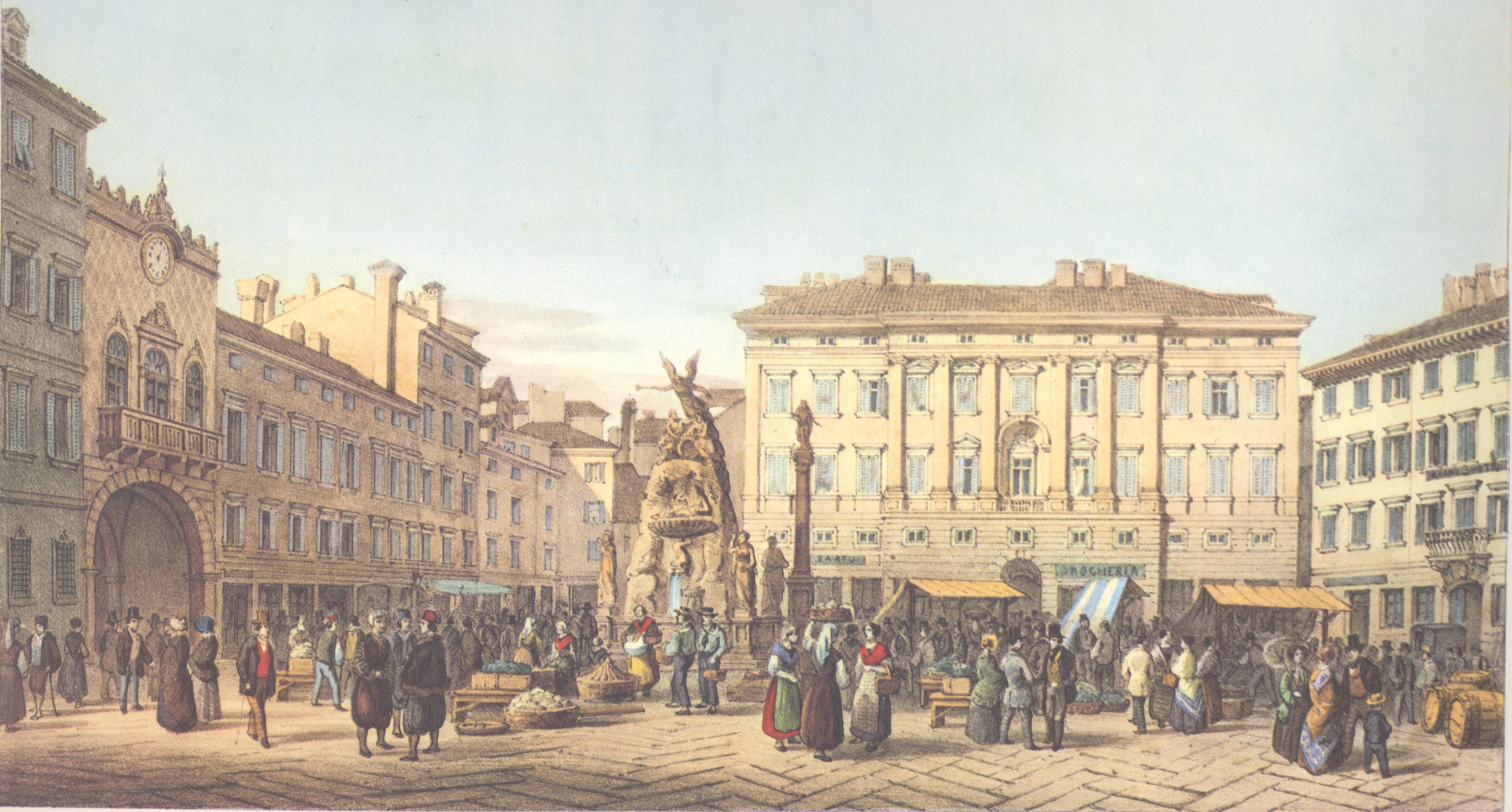
Historical 19th century image of present-day Piazza Unità d'Italia in Trieste

The news of Winckelmann's murder spread throughout learned Europe and made a huge impression. Johann Wolfgang von Goethe, for example, always remembered when and where he received the news of Winckelmann's death. It became the object of many speculations and narratives in private correspondence and discussions as well as in forensic reports, articles and public speeches. Prof. Lionel Gossman, for example, believes that there are reminiscences of Winckelmann's murder, whether conscious or not, in Thomas Mann's Death in Venice (1913).

In the course of the six interrogations to which he was subjected Arcangeli provided contradictory versions of events: he said he had killed Winckelmann because he thought he was a spy, or to rob him, or because he was a Jew or a Lutheran. Others note that Arcangeli might have been suspicious of some of Winckelmann's book written in unfamiliar characters, perhaps in Greek. Arcangeli seemed unaware of Winckelmann's wealth and he did not take anything when he fled.

The strangeness of Winckelmann's behavior was also noticed, i.e. his registration under an assumed name, the absence of any contact with authorities or notable people during his stay in Trieste as well as his association with a disreputable individual like Arcangeli and his reticence to openly identify himself in the hours before his death. It is commonly thought that Winckelmann was killed during an attempted robbery, but the hypothesis of a sexual crime was also popular. Winckelmann's homosexuality was no secret to his contemporaries. The suspicion was that Arcangeli murdered Winckelmann for making unwanted sexual advances, perhaps on the first occasion he did so, perhaps in the course of a sexual relationship that had evolved over several days.

== Bibliography ==
- Aldrich, Robert (2002). The Seduction of the Mediterranean: Writing, Art and Homosexual Fantasy. London – New York: Routledge. p. 43. ISBN 0-415-09312-0.
- Gossman, Lionel (1992). "Death in Trieste". Journal of European Studies. 22 (3): 207–240. doi:10.1177/004724419202200301. S2CID 162293931.
