= Jakob Friedrich Ludovici =

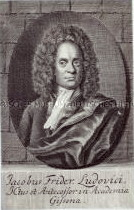
Jakob Friedrich Ludovici

Jakob Friedrich Ludovici (1671, Wacholzhagen near Treptow – 1723, Gießen) was a German jurist.

Ludovici studied law in Stargard, Königsberg and Halle. Appointed a professor extraordinary in 1701, he became a full professor in 1711. In 1721 he was appointed privy councillor, vice chancellor and Professor Juris primarius at the University of Gießen.

== Works ==
- Untersuchung des Indifferentismi Religionum, 1700
- Delineatio historiae juris divini, naturalis et positivi universalis, 1701
- Einleitung zum Lehns-Proceß, 1718 (E-Copy)
