= Cossus Cornelius Lentulus =

Cossus Cornelius Lentulus may refer to:

- Cossus Cornelius Lentulus Gaetulicus (consul 1 BC), a Roman politician and general
- Cossus Cornelius Lentulus (consul AD 25), a Roman senator who was active during the reign of Tiberius
- Cossus Cornelius Lentulus (consul AD 60), a Roman senator
