= Francesco Ficoroni =

Italian archaeologist and antiquarian

Francesco Ficoroni FRS
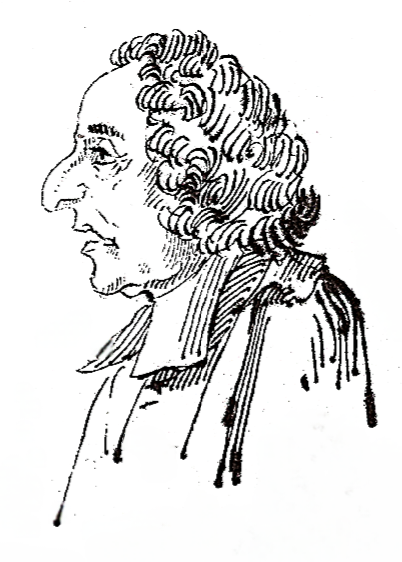
- Caricature of Francesco Ficoroni by Pier Leone Ghezzi
- Born: 1664; Labico, Papal States
- Died: 25 January 1747 (aged 82–83); Rome, Papal States
- Occupations: Archaeologist, connoisseur and antiquarian
- Known for: Discovery of the Ficoroni Cista
- Parent(s): Bonifacio Ficoroni and Maria Ficoroni (née Rosati)

Academic work
- Discipline: Classical archaeology
- Sub-discipline: Topography of ancient Rome

Signature
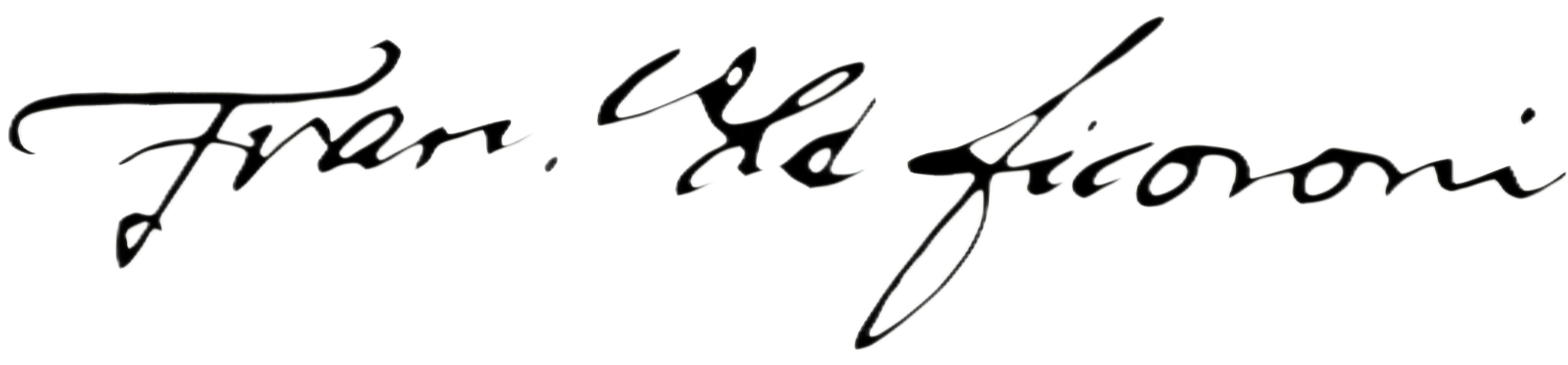

Francesco (de') Ficoroni FRS (1664 – 25 January 1747) was an Italian archaeologist, connoisseur and antiquarian active in Rome, closely involved with the antiquities trade. He was the author of numerous publications on ancient Roman sculpture and antiquities, guides to the monuments of Rome and the city's ancient topography, and on ancient Greek and Roman theatre and theatrical masks, among other subjects. For his antiquarian works he was made a Fellow of the Royal Society of London. His complementary volumes on ancient and modern Rome (1744) remained in print long after his death: Thomas Jefferson purchased both volumes while he was abroad in 1785-89.

== Life ==
Ficoroni was born in Labico, in the comune of Valmontone, Latium. His first book, Osservazioni sopra l'antichità di Roma dal Padre B. de Montfaucon (Rome, 1709), was a scathing critique of Bernard de Montfaucon's Diarium Italicum. The book sparked a heated controversy between Ficoroni and Paolo Alessandro Maffei, who defended Montfaucon. The dispute was resolved with a decree from the Congregation of the Index, which forbade the republication of Ficoroni's and Maffei's books unless the offensive passages were removed.

From 1705 to 1710 Ficoroni undertook a series of excavations along the Via Appia in the vigna Moroni, the Moroni vineyard, which revealed ninety-two funerary chambers decorated with frescoes and mosaics, which provided material for his Bolla d'oro (1736); the excavation was supported by Cardinal Filippo Antonio Gualterio, who purchased many of the antiquities discovered. Later Ficoroni bought back some of Gualterio's objects, while over two hundred of the examples of glass, terracotta oil lamps and some carved hardstones were purchased by Sir Hans Sloane and eventually found their way, with the rest of his collection, to establish the British Museum. Reasons of cost aborted the engraving of the watercolor drawings of the frescoes (now long disappeared) made for Ficoroni by Gaetano Piccini (1681–1736); the watercolors were purchased by Cardinal Gualterio but dispersed after his death in 1728. The frescos in the 92 tombs unearthed along the via Appia were visited by the painter Carlo Maratta, who brought his students to view them.

Ficoroni's excavations at Hadrian's Villa were never fully published. Carlo Fea summarised some outstanding finds in 1790.

Ficoroni owned an important collection of ancient artifacts which earned him great fame, but which was dispersed after his death. It contained small objects and rarities including mirrors, graffiti, lead seals, coins, cameos, lockets and tesserae. The most important piece in his collection was the fourth-century BCE cylindrical bronze ritual vessel known still as the Ficoroni Cista, which was found in an Etruscan woman's tomb just south of Palestrina (the ancient sanctuary site of Praeneste) in 1738 and which Ficoroni gallantly presented to the museum assembled by Athanasius Kircher in the Collegio Romano. The Ficoroni Cista is signed by its maker, Novius Plautius. It has four finials on its lid, the figure of Dionysus flanked by aroused satyrs, and love scenes of Heracles and Iolaos. Another important artifact belonging to Ficoroni's collection was the Ficoroni medallion, a gold glass portrait now in the Metropolitan Museum of Art, New York.

The catalogue of his own collection of ancient Roman mercantile sealings stamped in lead was written by conte C. Gaetani and doubtless published at Ficoroni's expense. He died in Rome on 25 January 1747.

== Selected publications ==
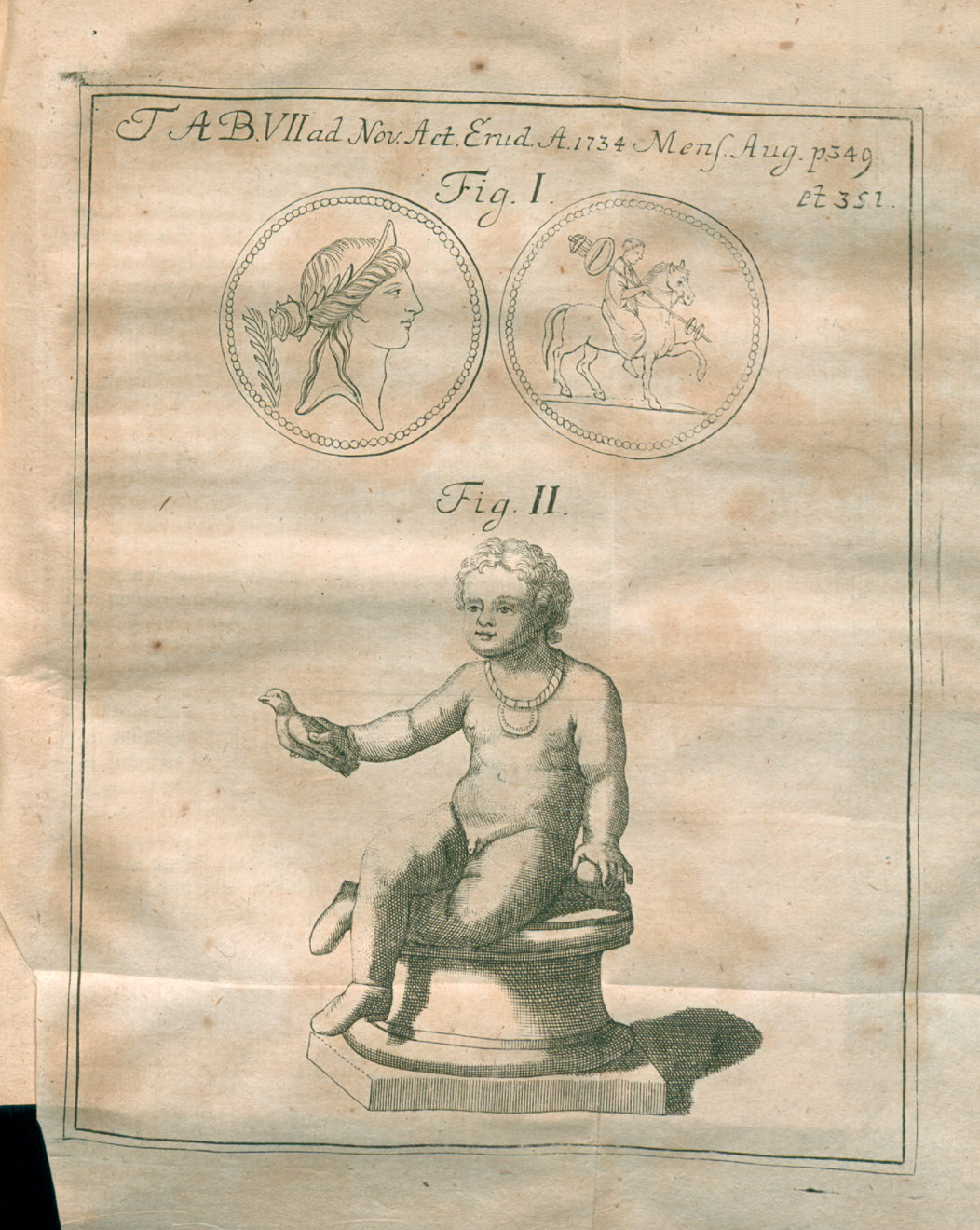
Illustration of the review of Ficoroni's La bolla d'oro de' fanciulli nobili romani, published on Acta Eruditorum, 1734.

- Osservazioni... sopra l'antichità di Roma... dal... Padre B. de Montfaucon (Rome, 1700, 1709).
- Lettera scritta al ill. Sig. G., Lord Johnstone... sovra un nuova cameo esprimente Marcello nipote di Augusto (Naples, 1718, 1726).
- Le memorie più singolari di Roma e sue vicinanze, notate in una lettera... all'Illustrissimo Cav. Bernard Inglese aggiuntavi nel fine la spiegazione d'una medaglia d'Omero (Rome, 1730).
- La Bolla d'oro de fanciulli nobili Romani, e qualla de' libertini (Rome, 1732); one of the objects described is the Ficoroni medallion, a gilded glass medallion now at the Metropolitan Museum of Art.
- I Tali, ed altri istromenti lusorj degli Antichi Romani (Rome, 1734)
- Le Maschere sceniche e le figure comiche d'antichi Romani descritte brevemente (Rome: Antonio de' Rossi, 1736, 1748) Dedicated to nob. sig. Paolo Ippolito De Beawille. A Latin translation, De larvis scenicis, appeared in 1750 and 1754.
- Breve descrizione di tre particolari statue trovatesi in Roma l'anno 1738 (Rome, no date [1738]).
- Le Vestigia e rarità di Roman antica ricercate, e spiegate (Rome:G. Mainardi, 1744).
- Le Singolarità di Roma moderna (Rome, 1744), a companion volume to I Tali.
- Le memorie ritrovate nel territorio della prima, e seconda città di Labico e i loro giuste siti. (Rome:G. Mainardi, 1745)
- Gemmae litteratae antiquae, aliaeque rariores (Rome, 1757). The engraving were by P. Nicola Galeotti.
