= Monte Compatri =

- Comune
- Comune di Monte Compatri
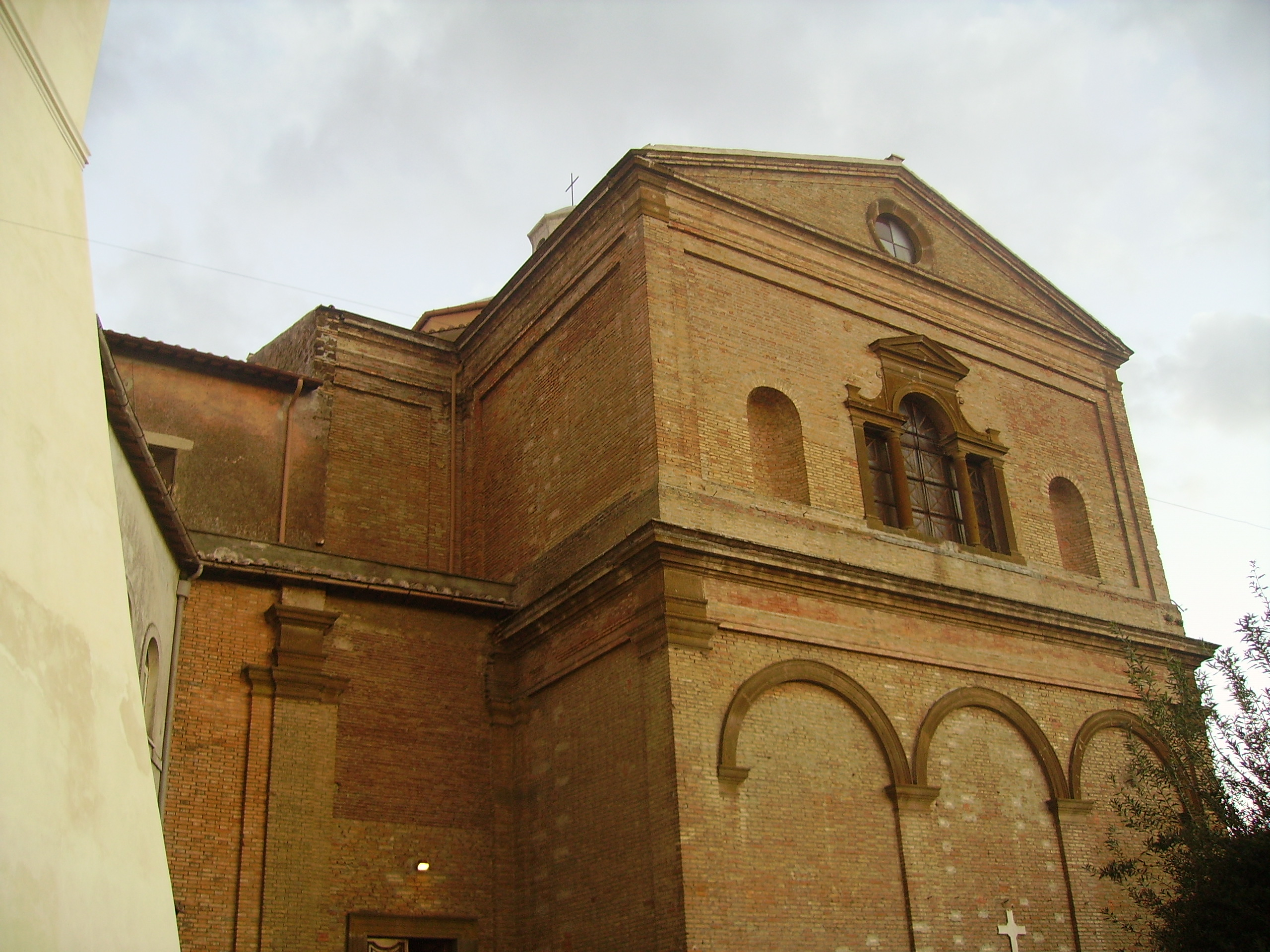
- Apse of the Assunta Baroque parish church.

- Coat of arms

- Location within Italy Location within Lazio
- Coordinates: 41°48′29″N 12°44′14″E
- Country: Italy
- Region: Lazio
- Metropolitan city: Rome (RM)
- Frazioni: La Cucca, Laghetto, Molara, Pantano, Pratarena

Government
  - Mayor: Francesco Ferri (Democratic Party)

Area
  - Total: 24.57 km^{2} (9.49 sq mi)
- Elevation: 576 m (1,890 ft)

Population (30 October 2017)
  - Total: 12,144
  - Density: 494.3/km^{2} (1,280/sq mi)
- Demonym: Monticiani
- Time zone: UTC+1 (CET)
  - Summer (DST): UTC+2 (CEST)
- Postal code: 00040
- Dialing code: 06
- Saint day: 19 March
- Website: Official website

Monte Compatri (Italian pronunciation: [ˈmonte ˈkɔmpatri]) is a comune (municipality) in the Metropolitan City of Rome in the Italian region of Latium, located about 20 kilometres (12 mi) southeast of Rome on the Alban Hills. It is one of the Castelli Romani.

== History ==
Monte Compatri has been identified with the ancient Labicum, a colony of Alba Longa. In the Middle Ages it was a fief of the Counts of Tusculum, then of the Annibaldi, the Altemps and the Borghese.

== Main sights ==
- Parish church of Santa Maria Assunta in Cielo (1630–33), erected by will of Scipione Borghese. The campanile is the former communal tower. The façade was designed by Carlo Rainaldi
- Palazzo Borghese, the current town hall
- Gabii
- San Silvestro monastery

== People ==
- Marco Mastrofini (1763–1845), philosopher and mathematician
- Cardinal Pompeo Colonna (1479–1530)
- Alessandro Moreschi (1858–1922) last castrato singer in the Sistine Chapel

== Twin cities ==
- Calahorra, Spain

Statesboro, Georgia, US
