= Toleria =

Scientific classification
- Kingdom: Animalia
- Phylum: Arthropoda
- Class: Insecta
- Order: Lepidoptera
- Family: Sesiidae
- Tribe: Cisuvorini
- Genus: Toleria; Walker, [1865]

Species
- See text

Genus of moths

Toleria is a genus of moths in the family Sesiidae.

== Species ==
- Toleria abiaeformis Walker, [1865]
- Toleria aegerides (Strand, [1916])
- Toleria aritai Ogane & Kallies, 2020
- Toleria colochelyna (Bryk, 1947)
- Toleria ilana Arita & Gorbunov, 2001
- Toleria sinensis (Walker, [1865])
- Toleria vietnamica Gorbunov & Arita, 2020
