= Laurence James Ludovici =

British non-fiction writer

- Born: 19 September 1910; Colombo, Ceylon
- Died: 24 April 1996 (aged 85); London, England
- Education: Royal College, Colombo; University of Oxford
- Occupations: Editor, biographer, author

Laurence (Lorenz) James Vernon Ludovici (19 September 1910 – 24 April 1996) was an Ceylon born British non-fiction author. He was known for his biographical accounts of scientific and medical achievements.

He was born in Colombo, Sri Lanka, the son of Pieter James Owen Ludovici (1877-1953), superintendent of police, and Marion Zoe née de Hoedt (1886-1926), daughter of Frederick James de Hoedt and Alice Lucretia Vander née Straaten. He attended Royal College, Colombo and in 1931 he secured a scholarship to study at the Honour School of Modern History at the University of Oxford. He joined Hutchinson Heinemann before moving to become an editor at Methuen Publishing. In 1938, Andrew Drakers, managing director Metheun, formed his own publishing house, with Ludovici, as Literary Director. During World War II he served with the Royal Air Force, firstly as an aircraftsman and received a commission in December 1941, performing fighter control and special intelligence work. He was appointed staff officer at the Air Ministry with the rank of Squadron leader, engaged in preparation of narratives of air histories. After the war he returned to the firm of Andrew Dakers until he resigned in 1948.

In 1953 he was asked to write the biography of Mary Milne OBE, Matron of St Mary's Hospital, London. Milne however insisted he write about Sir Alexander Fleming instead. His book, Fleming - Discoverer of Penicillin was published that year. The book was also published in the United States and translated into Japanese. Kirkus Reviews states, that it was the first biography to be released on Fleming and that "for all those interested in medicine and particularly valuable as a handy and readable reference for the physician, student and inquisitive layman."

In 1956 he wrote, The Challenging Sky: The Life of Sir Alliott Verdon-Roe, a biography of aircraft designer, Alliott Verdon Roe, the manufacturer of the Avro aircraft.

In 1961 he wrote Cone of Oblivion - A Vendetta in Science, which tells the story of the controversy that arose following the first use of ether as an anaesthetic by American dentist, William Thomas Green Morton and the claims of Charles Thomas Jackson. Kirkus Reviews stated, Through a mass of memoirs, trial transcriptions, newspaper data and pamphlets, author Ludovici highlights Morton's early Farmington experiments, then his first successful staging of ""a kind of sleep"" during a major Boston operation, and finally the bitter struggle to obtain patent rights via Congress, Europe, Medical Associations and one litigations after another, with the influential Jackson hounding and frustrating him at every turn.

In 1981 he wrote a biography, Cosmetic Scalpel: The Life of Charles Willi, Beauty-Surgeon, on Charles Henry Willi, an unlicensed medical practitioner, who was a highly successful plastic surgeon in London, between 1910 and 1961.

Ludovici married Maria Sohekr (1910-1995) of Alsace, Germany in 1933 in England. He died in London on 24 April 1996.

== Bibliography ==
- Fleming - Discoverer of Penicillin. A. Drakers (1953)
- The Challenging Sky: The Life of Sir Alliott Verdon-Roe. London: Herbert Jenkins, (1956)
- Nobel Prize Winners. Acro Publishers, London (1957)
- Tomorrow Sometimes Comes: Ten Years Against Tyranny. Odhams Press (1957)
- The World of The Infinitely Small, Explorations through the Microscope. Putnam (1959)
- Cone of Oblivion - A Vendetta in Science. Max Parrish & Co. Ltd, London (1961)
- The Discovery of Anaesthesia. New York: Thomas Y. Crowell Company (1961)
- Great Moments in Medicine. Phoenix House / Roy Publishers (1961)
- The Itch for Play: Gamblers and Gambling in High Life and Low Life. London: Jarrolds (1962)
- The Chain of Life: The Story of Heredity. Phoenix House (1963)
- The Great Tree of Life. Paleontology: The Natural History of Living Creatures. Phoenix House (1963)
- Origins of Language. (1965)
- Seeing Near and Seeing Far: The Story of Microscopes and Telescopes. J. Baker (1966)
- Spade and Script. Putnam (1968)
- The Final Inequality: A Critical Assessment of Womans's Sexual Role in Society. New York: Tower Books (1971)
- Cosmetic Scalpel: The Life of Charles Willi, Beauty-Surgeon. Bradford-on-Avon: Moonraker Press (1981)
- The Three of Us. London: Marjay Books (1993)
