= Publius Postumius Albus Regillensis =

5th-century BC Roman military consular tribune

Publius Postumius Albus Regillensis, whom Livy calls "Marcus", was a patrician politician of ancient Rome who was appointed one of four military consular tribunes in 414 BC.

Around that year, he was given command against the Aequi, and showed great energy and enterprise in quickly taking the Aequian town of Bolae, while promising his forces that any plunder or spoils captured would be distributed among the troops. Afterwards, he angered his soldiers by reneging on his promise; although some contemporary writers thought he had stayed true to his word, and suggested that his soldiers' anger came about because the town had been recently sacked and then repopulated by new settlers, and there were fewer valuables to be taken than Postumius had led them to expect (Livy found this latter explanation unlikely).

Shortly afterwards Postumius made a minor scandal in Rome when at a public assembly he threatened to punish for his soldiers after it was suggested that Bolae be given to them as settlers. When his men, furious at this new insult, assaulted a quaestor who had attempted to calm the mutinous mood, Postumius punished them severely, and ordered several of his men to be crushed to death. Several of his soldiers attempted to stop the executions by force, and when Postumius rushed to aid his lictors and centurions who were trying to break up the gathering, an angry mob of his men seized him and stoned him to death.

== See also ==
- Postumia gens

Political offices
| Preceded by Publius Cornelius Cossus, Numerius Fabius Vibulanus, Gaius Valerius Potitus Volusus, Quintus Quinctius Cincinnatus as Consular tribunes of the Roman Republic | Consular tribune of the Roman Republic; 414 BC with Gnaeus Cornelius Cossus, Lucius Valerius Potitus, Quintus Fabius Vibulanus II | Succeeded by Aulus Cornelius Cossus, II and Lucius Furius Medullinus as Consuls of the Roman Republic |
