= Labici =

Ancient Roman city in Italy

Labici or Labicum or Lavicum (Latin: Lăbīcī or Lăbīcum) was an ancient city of Latium, in what is now central Italy, lying in the territory of the modern Monte Compatri, about 20 km SE from Rome, on the northern slopes of the Alban Hills. Exact location of the original city is however disputed.

It occurs among the thirty cities of the Latin League, and it is said to have joined the Aequi and the Volsci in 419 BC and to have been stormed by the Romans in 418 BC. After this, it does not appear in history, and in the time of Cicero and Strabo was almost entirely deserted, if not destroyed. Traces of its ancient walls have been noticed. Its place was taken by the respublica Lavicanorum Quintanensium, the post-station established in the lower ground on the Via Labicana, a little SW of the modern village of Colonna, the site of which is attested by various inscriptions and by the course of the road itself.

Julius Caesar had a villa near here.
