= Gaius Fabius Ambustus =

Gaius Fabius Ambustus may refer to:

- Gaius Fabius Ambustus (consul)
- Gaius Fabius Ambustus (magister equitum 315 BC)

== See also ==
- Ambustus (disambiguation)
