= Fabia gens =

Ancient Roman family

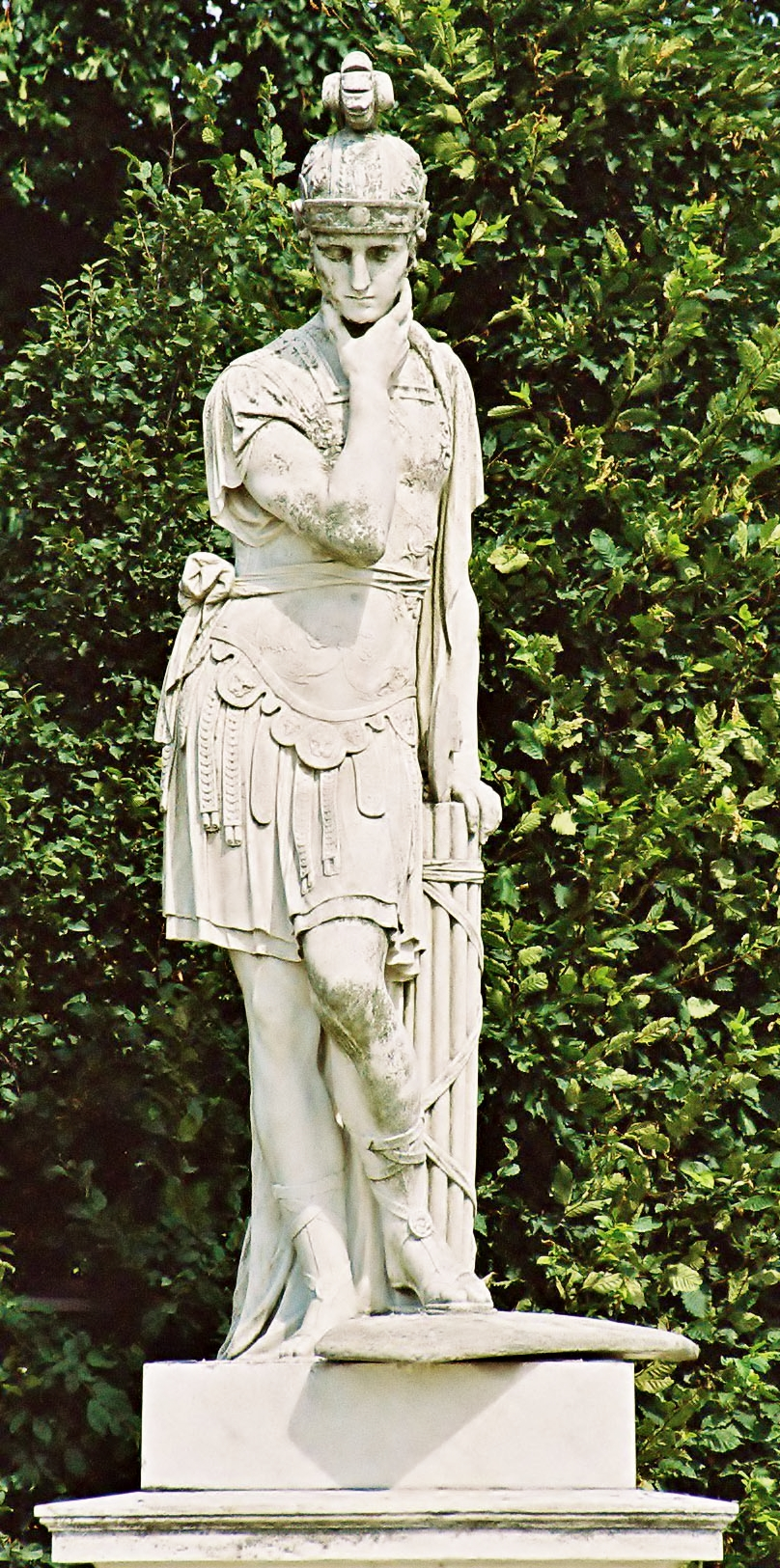
Statue of Quintus Fabius Maximus Verrucosus, made between 1773–1780 for Schönbrunn Palace, Vienna.

The gens Fabia was one of the most ancient patrician families of ancient Rome. The gens played a prominent part in history soon after the establishment of the Republic, and three brothers were invested with seven successive consulships, from 485 to 479 BC, thereby cementing the high repute of the family. Overall, the Fabii received 45 consulships during the Republic. The house derived its greatest lustre from the patriotic courage and tragic fate of the 306 Fabii in the Battle of the Cremera, 477 BC. But the Fabii were not distinguished as warriors alone; several members of the gens were also important in the history of Roman literature and the arts.

== Background ==
The family is generally thought to have been counted amongst the gentes maiores, the most prominent of the patrician houses at Rome, together with the Aemilii, Claudii, Cornelii, Manlii, and Valerii; but no list of the gentes maiores has survived, and even the number of families so designated is a complete mystery. Until 480 BC, the Fabii were staunch supporters of the aristocratic policies favoring the patricians and the senate against the plebs. However, following a great battle that year against the Veientes, in which victory was achieved only by cooperation between the generals and their soldiers, the Fabii aligned themselves with the plebs.

One of the thirty-five voting tribes into which the Roman people were divided was named after the Fabii; several tribes were named after important gentes, including the tribes Aemilia, Claudia, Cornelia, Fabia, Papiria, Publilia, Sergia, and Veturia. Several of the others appear to have been named after lesser families.

The most famous legend of the Fabii asserts that, following the last of the seven consecutive consulships in 479 BC, the gens undertook the war with Veii as a private obligation. A militia consisting of over three hundred men of the gens, together with their friends and clients, a total of some four thousand men, stationed itself in arms on a hill overlooking the Cremera, a small river between Rome and Veii. The cause of this secession is said to have been the enmity between the Fabii and the patricians, who regarded them as traitors for advocating the causes of the plebeians. The Fabian militia remained in their camp on the Cremera for two years, successfully opposing the Veientes, until at last, on the fifteenth day before the kalends of Sextilis—July 18, 477 BC—they were lured into an ambush and destroyed. Three hundred and six Fabii of fighting age were said to have perished in the disaster, leaving only a single survivor to return home. By some accounts he was the only survivor of the entire gens; but it seems unlikely that the camp of the Fabii included not only all of the men, but the women and children of the family as well. They and the elders of the gens probably remained at Rome.

This story was considerably embellished at a later date in order to present the Battle of the Cremera as a Roman counterpart to the Greek Battle of Thermopylae. (Note: In 479 BC, not long before the disaster of the Cremera, three hundred Spartans fell holding off the advance of Persian forces at Thermopylae; the near-contemporary dates and the number of the Fabii who fell—three hundred and six six—may have made the parallel inevitable.) However, historian Tim Cornell writes that there is no reason to doubt the historicity of the battle, because the tribus Fabia—presumably where the Fabii had their country estates—was located near the Cremera, on the border with Veii. The day on which the Fabii perished was forever remembered, as it was the same day that the Gauls defeated the Roman army at the Battle of the Allia in 390 BC. The Gauls had marched on Rome only in retaliation after Quintus Fabius Ambustus, sent as an ambassador, broke a truce to attack the Gauls at Clusium.

Throughout the history of the Republic, the Fabii made several alliances with other prominent families, especially plebeian and Italian ones, which partly explains their long prominence. The first of such alliances that can be traced dates from the middle of the fifth century and was with the Poetelii; it lasted for at least a century. In the fourth century, the Fabii were allied to the patrician Manlii and the plebeian Genucii and Licinii, whom they supported during the Conflict of the Orders. They then occupied an unprecedented leading position in the third century, as three generations of Fabii were princeps senatus—a unique occurrence during the Republic. (Note: Ryan dismisses Pliny's account of the three consecutive principes: Ambustus, Rullianus, and Gurges. He suggests instead Rullianus, Gurges, and Verrucosus, but does not believe that they served consecutively.) During this period, they allied with the plebeian Atilii from Campania, where the Fabii had significant estates, the Fulvii and Mamilii from Tusculum, the Otacili from Beneventum, the Ogulnii from Etruria, and the Marcii. They also sponsored the emergence of the Caecilii Metelli and Porcii, who owed their first consulate to the Fabii, as well as the re-emergence of the patrician Quinctii. The main direction of the second war against Carthage was disputed between the Fabii and the Cornelii Scipiones. The death of Fabius Verrucosus in 203 marks the end of the Fabian leadership on Roman politics, by now assumed by their rivals: Scipio Africanus and his family. After the consulship of Fabius Maximus Eburnus in 116, the Fabii entered a century-long eclipse, until their temporary revival under Augustus.

The name of the Fabii was associated with one of the two colleges of the Luperci, the priests who carried on the sacred rites of the ancient religious festival of the Lupercalia. The other college bore the name of the Quinctilii, suggesting that in the earliest times these two gentes superintended these rites as a sacrum gentilicum, much as the Pinarii and Potitii maintained the worship of Hercules. Such sacred rites were gradually transferred to the state, or opened to the Roman populus; a well-known legend attributed the destruction of the Potitii to the abandonment of its religious office. In later times the privilege of the Lupercalia had ceased to be confined to the Fabii and the Quinctilii.

== Origin ==
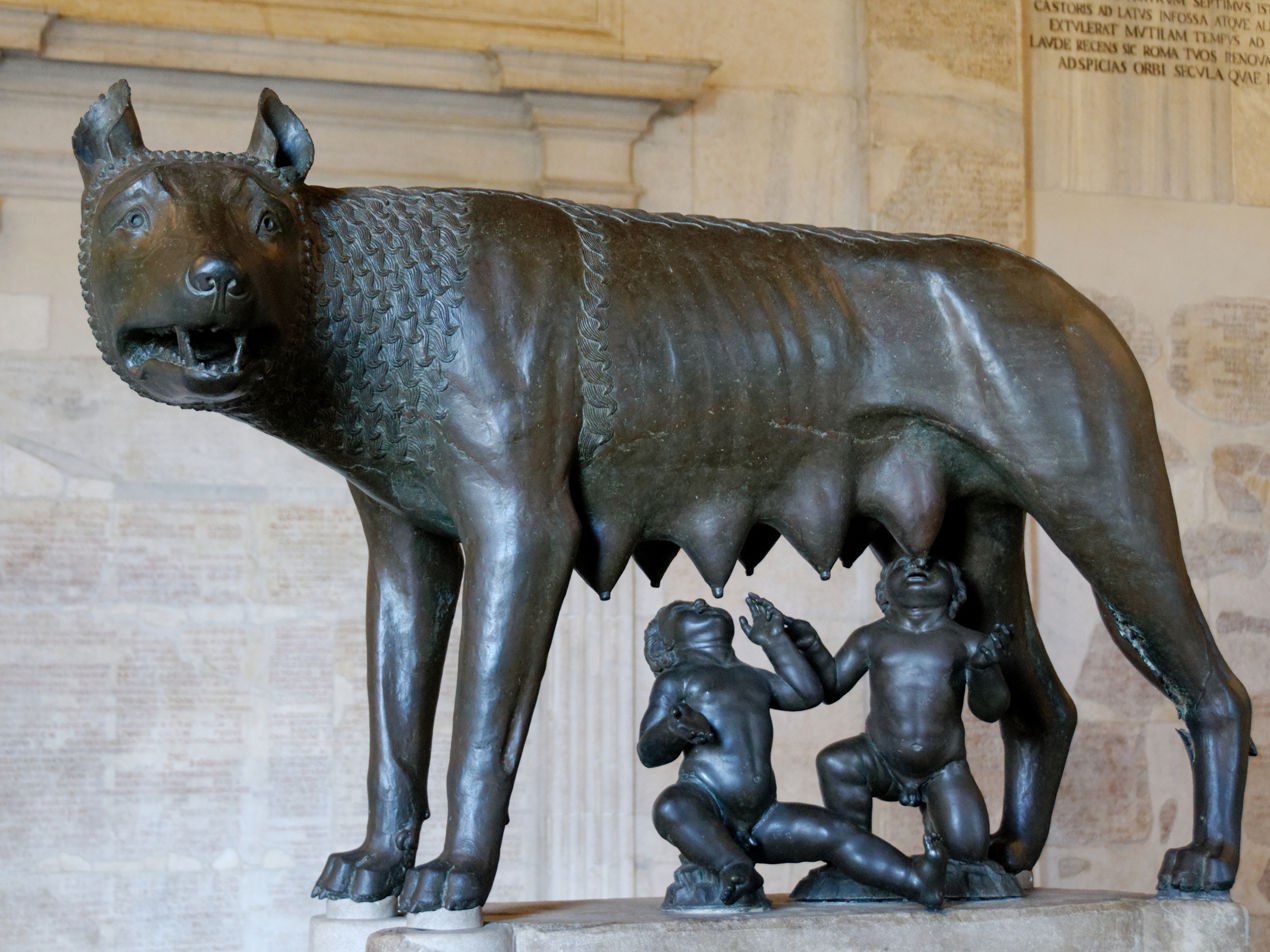
The Capitoline Wolf with Romulus and Remus. One legend holds that their respective followers were called the Quinctilii and the Fabii.

According to legend, the Fabii claimed descent from Hercules, who visited Italy a generation before the Trojan War, and from Evander, his host, through Fabius. This brought the Fabii into the same tradition as the Pinarii and Potitii, who were said to have welcomed Hercules and learned from him the sacred rites which for centuries afterward they performed in his honor.

Another early legend stated that at the founding of Rome, the followers of the brothers Romulus and Remus were called the Quinctilii and the Fabii, respectively. The brothers were said to have offered up sacrifices in the cave of the Lupercal at the base of the Palatine Hill, which became the origin of the Lupercalia. This story is certainly connected with the tradition that the two colleges of the Luperci bore the names of these ancient gentes.

The nomen of the Fabii is said originally to have been Fovius, Favius, or Fodius; Plinius stated that it was derived from faba, a bean, a vegetable which the Fabii were said to have first cultivated. A more fanciful explanation derives the name from fovea, ditches, which the ancestors of the Fabii were said to have used in order to capture wolves.

It is uncertain whether the Fabii were of Latin or Sabine origin. Niebuhr, followed by Göttling, considered them Sabines. However, other scholars are unsatisfied with their reasoning, and point out that the legend associating the Fabii with Romulus and Remus would place them at Rome before the incorporation of the Sabines into the nascent Roman state.

It may nonetheless be noted that, even supposing this tradition to be based on actual historical events, the followers of the brothers were described as "shepherds," and presumably included many of the people then living in the countryside where the city of Rome was to be built. The hills of Rome were already inhabited at the time of the city's legendary founding, and they stood in the hinterland between the Latins, Sabines, and Etruscans. Even if many the followers of Romulus and Remus were Latins from the ancient city of Alba Longa, many may also have been Sabines already living in the surrounding countryside.

== Praenomina ==
The earliest generations of the Fabii favored the praenomina Caeso, Quintus, and Marcus. They were the only patrician gens to make regular use of Numerius, which appears in the family after the destruction of the Fabii at the Cremera. According to the tradition related by Festus, this praenomen entered the gens when Quintus Fabius Vibulanus, the consul of 467, married a daughter of Numerius Otacilius of Maleventum, and bestowed his father-in-law's name on his son. (Note: This story is doubted by Münzer and Ogilvie, who consider it to be anachronistic, as Otacilius is described as a Samnite, and there was no significant contact between Rome and the Samnites for another century. Münzer argues that Numerius appears only among the collateral stirpes of the Buteones and Pictores, but never among the main line of the family, the Vibulani, Ambusti, and Maximi. Manuscripts of Livy give Gnaeus instead of Numerius among the older Fabii, which has generally been amended to Numerius, following the Capitoline Fasti. Carolus Sigonius followed this scheme in his editio princeps of Livy in 1555, as have most later historians. However, Münzer prefers Gnaeus, otherwise unused by the Fabii, as Livy had access to sources predating the chronology of Varro, which was used to compile the Fasti. According to Münzer, the first of the Fabii to bear the name was Numerius Fabius Buteo, the consul of 247; his father, Marcus, did not follow the usual convention of giving his praenomen to his eldest son, and must therefore have been the Fabius to whom Festus referred.)

Although the Fabii Ambusti and some later branches of the family used the praenomen Gaius, Quintus is the name most frequently associated with the Fabii of the later Republic. The Fabii Maximi used it almost to the exclusion of all other names until the end of the Republic, when they revived the ancient praenomen Paullus. (Note: Besides Paullus and Africanus Fabius Maximus—the latter originally named "Quintus"—all of the Fabii Maximi mentioned in history bore the praenomen Quintus, including some who were brothers. Epigraphy supplies examples of Fabii Maximi with other praenomina, dating from imperial times, although it is unknown whether any of them were descended from the Fabii Maximi of the Republic, or had assumed the surname as an allusion to the illustrious Fabii of previous centuries: Decimus Fabius Maximus, Lucius Fabius Maximus, Marcus Fabius Maximus, Publius Fabius Maximus.) This was done in honor of the Aemilii Paulli, from whom the later Fabii Maximi were descended, having been adopted into the Fabia gens at the end of the 3rd century BC. A variety of surnames associated with the Aemilii were also used by this family, and one of the Fabii was called Africanus Fabius Maximus, although his proper name was Quintus Fabius Maximus Africanus. In a manuscript of Cicero, Servius appears among the Fabii Pictores, but this seems to have been a corruption in the manuscript, which originally read Numerius.

== Branches and cognomina ==
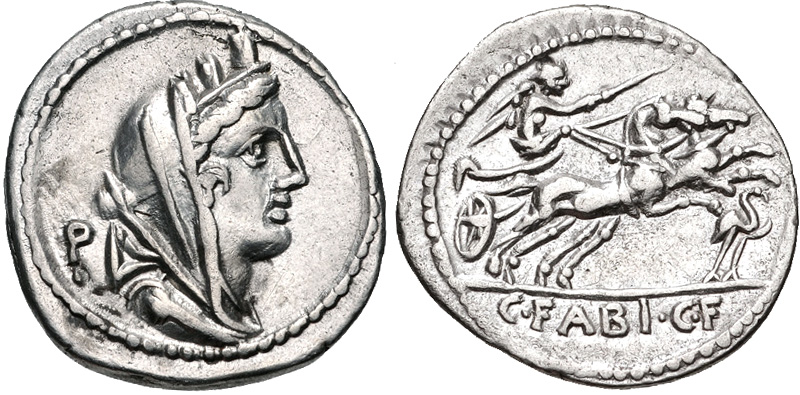
Denarius of Gaius Fabius Hadrianus, 102 BC. On the obverse is the head of Cybele, a possible allusion to the visit to Rome of Battaces, a priest of Magna Mater. The reverse depicts Victoria driving a biga, with a flamingo below.

The cognomina of the Fabii under the Republic were Ambustus, Buteo, Dorso or Dorsuo, Labeo, Licinus, Maximus (with the agnomina Aemilianus, Allobrogicus, Eburnus, Gurges, Rullianus, Servilianus, and Verrucosus), Pictor, and Vibulanus. Other cognomina belonged to persons who were not, strictly speaking, members of the gens, but who were freedmen or the descendants of freedmen, or who had been enrolled as Roman citizens under the Fabii. The only cognomina appearing on coins are Hispaniensis, Labeo, Maximus, and Pictor.

In imperial times it becomes difficult to distinguish between members of the gens and unrelated persons sharing the same nomen. Members of the gens are known as late as the second century, but persons bearing the name of Fabius continue to appear into the latest period of the Empire.

The eldest branch of the Fabii bore the cognomen Vibulanus, which may allude to an ancestral home of the gens. The surname Ambustus, meaning "burnt", replaced Vibulanus at the end of the fifth century BC; the first of the Fabii to be called Ambustus was a descendant of the Vibulani. The most celebrated stirps of the Fabia gens, which bore the surname Maximus, was in turn descended from the Fabii Ambusti. This family was famous for its statesmen and its military exploits, which lasted from the Samnite Wars, in the fourth century BC until the wars with the Germanic invaders of the second century BC. Most, if not all of the later Fabii Maximi were descendants of Quintus Fabius Maximus Aemilianus, one of the Aemilii Paulli, who as a child was adopted into that illustrious family. (Note: Although some sources state that they were adopted by Quintus Fabius Maximus Verrucosus, who died in 203 BC, it has been argued that their father, Lucius Aemilius Paullus Macedonicus, as the only surviving member of the Aemilii Paulli following the Battle of Cannae, would not have allowed his two elder children to be adopted out of the gens until after the birth of his two younger sons, circa 180–177 BC.)

Buteo, which described a type of hawk, was originally given to a member of the Fabia gens because such a bird on one occasion settled upon his ship with a favorable omen. This tradition, related by Plinius, does not indicate which of the Fabii first obtained this surname, but it was probably one of the Fabii Ambusti. Crawford suggests that the buteo of the legend was not a hawk, but a flamingo, based on the appearance of a bird resembling a flamingo on the coins of Gaius Fabius Hadrianus, who may have sought to associate himself with that family by the use of such a symbol. Hadrianus and his descendants form the last distinguishable family of the Fabii. Their surname was probably derived from the Latin colony of Hatria, and it is likely that they were not lineal descendants of the Fabii Buteones, but newly-enfranchised citizens. The flamingo might also allude to the family's coastal origins.

The surname Pictor, borne by another family of the Fabii, signifies a painter, and the earliest known member of this family was indeed a painter, famed for his work in the temple of Salus, built by Gaius Junius Bubulcus Brutus between 307 and 302 BC. The later members of this family, several of whom were distinguished in the arts, appear to have been his descendants, and must have taken their cognomen from this ancestor. The cognomen Labeo—originally denoting someone with prominent lips—appears at the beginning of the second century BC; Quintus Fabius Labeo, the first of that name, was also a poet, but his line vanished before the end of the century.

== Members ==
This list includes abbreviated praenomina. For an explanation of this practice, see filiation.

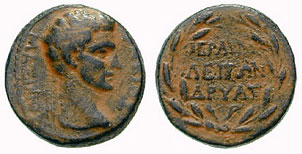
Coin of one of the Fabii Maximi, minted during the reign of Augustus

=== Fabii Vibulani et Ambusti ===
- Caeso Fabius Vibulanus, father of Quintus, Caeso, and Marcus, consuls from 485 to 479 BC.
- Quintus Fabius K. f. Vibulanus, consul in 485 and 482 BC. He waged war against the Volsci and Aequi. He fell in battle against the Veientes in 480.
- Caeso Fabius K. f. Vibulanus, quaestor in 485 BC, he prosecuted Spurius Cassius Vecellinus, consul of the preceding year, on a charge of treason. Consul in 484, 481, and 479, Fabius continued the war against the Aequi and Veii. He led the Fabii at the Battle of the Cremera, where he died.
- Marcus Fabius K. f. Vibulanus, consul in 483 and 480 BC. He resigned two months before the end of his second consulship, after sustaining injuries in a battle against Veii, during which his brother Quintus was slain.
- Quintus Fabius M. f. K. n. Vibulanus, consul in 467, 465, and 459. The only survivor of the Battle of the Cremera. He fought against the Aequi in each of his consulships, and was awarded a triumph during the last one. He was finally a member of the second Decemvirate in 450, and also urban prefect in 462 and 458.
- Marcus Fabius Vibulanus, named by Diodorus as one of the consuls in 457 BC, together with Cincinnatus. The majority of ancient sources name Gaius Horatius Pulvillus and Quintus Minucius Esquilinus as the consuls of this year.
- Marcus Fabius Q. f. M. n. Vibulanus, consul in 442 BC, legate during the war against Veii in 437, consular tribune in 433, and legate in 431.
- Numerius Fabius Q. f. M. n. Vibulanus, consul in 421, and consular tribune in 415 and 407 BC.
- Quintus Fabius Q. f. M. n. Vibulanus, consul in 423 and consular tribune in 416 and 414 BC.
- Quintus Fabius M. f. Q. n. Vibulanus Ambustus, consul in 412 BC.
- Caeso Fabius M. f. Q. n. Ambustus, consular tribune in 404, 401, 395, and 390 BC.
- Numerius Fabius M. f. Q. n. Ambustus, consular tribune in 406 and 390 BC.
- Quintus Fabius M. f. Q. n. Ambustus, consular tribune in 390 BC.
- Marcus Fabius Q. f. Q. n. Ambustus, pontifex maximus in 390 BC.
- Marcus Fabius K. f. M. n. Ambustus, consular tribune in 381 and 369 BC, and censor in 363; supported the lex Licinia Sextia, which granted the plebeians the right to hold the consulship.
- Fabia M. f. K. n., married Servius Sulpicius Praetextatus, consular tribune in 377, 376, 370, and 368 BC.
- Fabia M. f. K. n., married Gaius Licinius Calvus Stolo, consul in 364 and 361 BC.
- Marcus Fabius N. f. M. n. Ambustus, consul in 360, 356, and 354 BC, and princeps senatus; triumphed over the Tiburtines.
- Gaius Fabius N. f. M. n. Ambustus, consul in 358 BC.
- Marcus Fabius M. f. N. n. Ambustus, magister equitum in 322 BC.
- Quintus Fabius Ambustus, nominated dictator in 321 BC, but compelled to resign due to a fault in the auspices.
- Gaius Fabius M. f. N. n. Ambustus, appointed magister equitum in 315 BC, in place of Quintus Aulius, who fell in battle.

=== Fabii Dorsuones et Licini ===
- Gaius Fabius Dorsuo, bravely left the Capitoline Hill to perform a sacrifice when Rome was occupied by the Gauls following the Battle of the Allia in 390 BC, eluding the Gallic sentries both on his departure and his return.
- Marcus Fabius (C. f.) Dorsuo, consul in 345 BC, carried on the war against the Volsci and captured Sora.
- Gaius Fabius M. f. M. n. Dorsuo Licinus, consul in 273 BC, died during his year of office.
- Marcus Fabius C. f. M. n. Licinus, consul in 246 BC.

=== Fabii Maximi ===
- Quintus Fabius M. f. N. n. Maximus Rullianus, magister equitum in 325 or 324, consul in 322, 310, 308, 297, and 295 BC, dictator in 315 and censor in 304, princeps senatus; triumphed in 322, 309, and 295.
- Quintus Fabius Q. f. M. n. Maximus Gurges, consul in 292, 276, and 265 BC, princeps senatus; triumphed in 291 and 276.
- Quintus Fabius (Maximus), aedile in 266 BC, he assaulted the ambassadors of Apollonia, and was remanded to the custody of the Apolloniates, but was dismissed unharmed. (Note: Broughton thought he could have been the son of Quintus Fabius Maximus Gurges, the consul of 292 and 276, and thus assigned him the consulship of 265. However, Ryan disagrees and gives the three consulships to Gurges.)
- Quintus Fabius Q. f. Q. n. Maximus Verrucosus, nicknamed Cunctator, consul in 233, 228, 215, 214 and 209 BC, censor in 230, and dictator in 221 and 217, princeps senatus; triumphed in 233.
- Quintus Fabius Q. f. Q. n. Maximus, consul in 213 BC.
- Quintus Fabius Q. f. Q. n. Maximus, appointed augur in 203 BC.
- Quintus Fabius Maximus, praetor peregrinus in 181 BC.
- Quintus Fabius Q. f. Q. n. Maximus Aemilianus, consul in 145 BC, the son of Lucius Aemilius Paullus, conqueror of Macedonia; as a child he was adopted by Quintus Fabius Maximus the praetor.
- Quintus Fabius Q. f. Q. n. Maximus Allobrogicus, consul in 121 BC, and censor in 108; triumphed over the Allobroges.
- Quintus Fabius Q. f. Q. n. Maximus Allobrogicus, son of the consul of 121 BC; remarkable only for his vices.
- Quintus Fabius Q. f. Q. n. Maximus Servilianus, consul in 142 BC.
- Quintus Fabius Maximus Eburnus, consul in 116 BC, he condemned one of his sons to death; being accused by Gnaeus Pompeius Strabo, he went into exile.
- Quintus Fabius Q. f. Q. n. Maximus, legate of Caesar, and consul suffectus in 45 BC.
- Paullus Fabius Q. f. Q. n. Maximus, consul in 11 BC.
- Quintus Fabius Q. f. Q. n. Maximus Africanus, better known as Africanus Fabius Maximus, consul in 10 BC.
- Quintus Fabius Allobrogicinus Maximus, named in an inscription from the Augustan era, now lost.
- Paullus Fabius Paulli f. Q. n. Persicus, consul in AD 34.
- (Fabia) Eburna, inferred by Ronald Syme from an inscription naming Eutychia, the slave-girl of a woman named Eburna; another inscription names a slave-woman named Alexa, perhaps belonging to the same Eburna.
- Fabius Numantinus, one of eight young men admitted to an undetermined sacerdotal college, possibly the sodales Titii, between AD 59 and 64.

=== Fabii Pictores ===
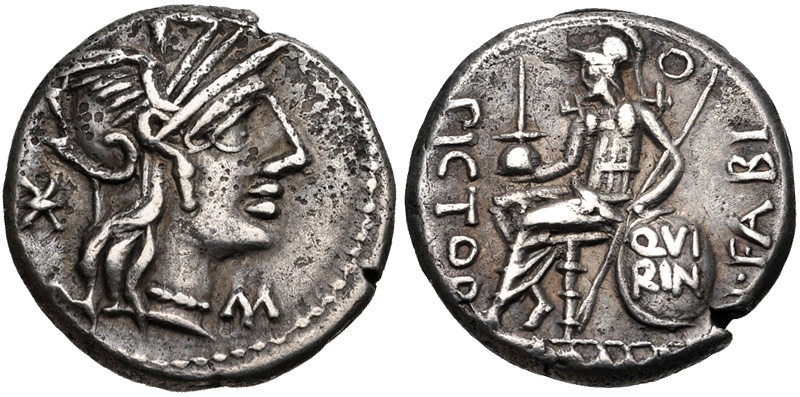
Denarius of Numerius Fabius Pictor, 126 BC. On the obverse is the head of Roma; on the reverse is Quintus Fabius Pictor, the praetor of 189, holding an apex and shield inscribed QVIRIN, alluding to his status of Flamen Quirinalis.

- Gaius Fabius M. f. Pictor, painted the interior of the temple of Salus, dedicated in 302 BC.
- Gaius Fabius C. f. M. n. Pictor, consul in 269 BC.
- Numerius Fabius C. f. M. n. Pictor, ambassador in 273 BC, he accompanied Quintus Fabius Maximus Gurges to the court of Ptolemy II Philadelphos. Consul in 266, he triumphed over the Sassinates, and again over the Sallentini and Messapii.
- Quintus Fabius C. f. C. n. Pictor, ambassador in 216 BC, he was sent to consult the oracle of Delphi in order to find ways to appease the gods after the disaster of Cannae. Pictor is known as the earliest of the Latin historians, although he wrote in Greek; he was an important source for later annalists, but most of his own work has been lost.
- Quintus Fabius Q. f. C. n. Pictor, praetor in 189 BC, received Sardinia as his province, but was compelled by the pontifex maximus to remain at Rome, because he was Flamen Quirinalis; his abdication was rejected by the senate, which designated him praetor peregrinus. He died in 167.
- Numerius Fabius Q. f. Q. n. Pictor, an annalist and antiquarian of the second century BC.
- Numerius Fabius N. f. Q. n. Pictor, triumvir monetalis in 126 BC.

=== Fabii Buteones ===
- Numerius Fabius M. f. M. n. Buteo, consul in 247 BC, during the First Punic War.
- Marcus Fabius M. f. M. n. Buteo, consul in 245 BC, censor, probably in 241; appointed dictator in 216 to fill the vacancies in the senate after the Battle of Cannae.
- Fabius M. f. M. n. Buteo, according to Orosius, accused of theft, and slain in consequence by his own father.
- Marcus Fabius Buteo, praetor in 201 BC, obtained Sardinia as his province.
- Quintus Fabius Buteo, praetor in 196 BC, obtained the province of Hispania Ulterior.
- Quintus Fabius Buteo, praetor in 181 BC, obtained Gallia Cisalpina as his province.
- Numerius Fabius Buteo, praetor in 173 BC, obtained the province of Hispania Citerior, but died at Massilia on his way to his province.
- Quintus Fabius Buteo, quaestor in 134 BC; apparently the son of Quintus Fabius Maximus Aemilianus, and nephew of Scipio Aemilianus, by whom he was entrusted with the command of four thousand volunteers during the Numantine War.

=== Fabii Labeones ===
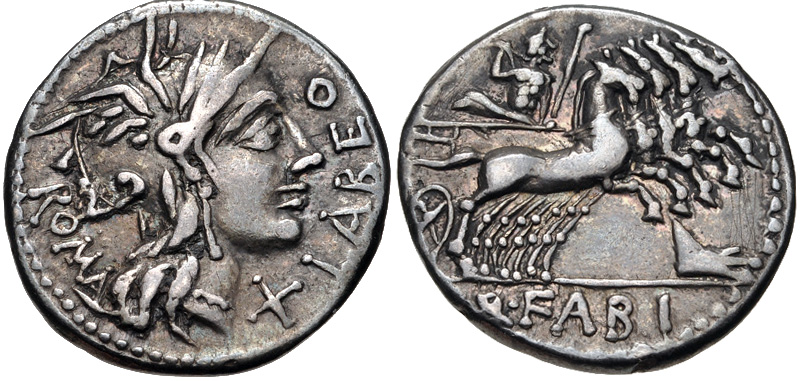
Denarius of Quintus Fabius Labeo, 124 BC. The obverse depicts the head of Roma, while the obverse shows Jupiter driving a quadriga. The prow below alludes to his grandfather's naval triumph.

- Quintus Fabius Q. f. Q. n. Labeo, quaestor urbanus in 196 BC. Praetor then propraetor in 189 and 188, he defeated the naval forces of Antiochus III, for which he received a naval triumph the following year. He was triumvir for establishing the colonies of Potentia and Pisaurum in 184, and Saturnia in 183. He was consul in 183, and proconsul in Liguria the following year. He also became pontiff in 180, and was part of a commission of ten men sent to advise Aemilius Paullus on the settlement of Macedonia in 167. He was also a poet, according to Suetonius.
- Quintus Fabius Q. f. Q. n. Labeo, a learned orator known whose eloquence is mentioned by Cicero. He must have lived about the middle of the second century BC, and either he or more probably his son was proconsul in Spain, where the name occurs on some milestones.
- Quintus Fabius Q. f. Q. n. Labeo, triumvir monetalis in 124 BC. He was probably proconsul in Spain between 120 and 100 BC.

=== Fabii Hadriani ===
- Gaius Fabius C. f. Q. n. Hadrianus, triumvir monetalis in 102 BC. A supporter of Cinna and Carbo during the Civil War against Sulla, he was appointed praetor of Africa in 84 BC. He remained there as propraetor for two years, but his government was so oppressive that the colonists and merchants at Utica burnt him to death in his own praetorium.
- Marcus Fabius C. f. C. n. Hadrianus, legate between 72 and 68 BC under Lucius Licinius Lucullus during the Third Mithridatic War. He was defeated by Mithridates in 68.
- Gaius Fabius M. f. C. n. Hadrianus, praetor in 58 BC, and subsequently proconsul in Asia, where he minted coins.

=== Others ===
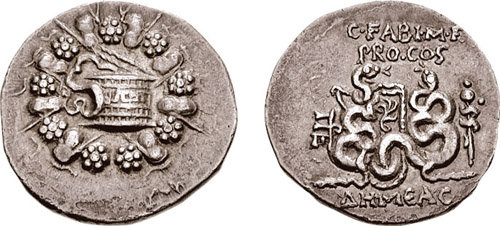
Tetradrachm of Gaius Fabius Hadrianus, as proconsul at Pergamon (with the local magistrate Demeas), circa 57 BC. On the obverse is a Cista mystica within ivy wreath; on the reverse is a bow case between two serpents, with a thyrsus on the right.

- Fabius Dorsennus, a Latin comic playwright, whose style and care was criticized by Quintus Horatius Flaccus.
- Lucius Fabius Hispaniensis, quaestor under Gaius Annius Luscus in Hispania from 82 to 81 BC. Like all magistrates in the year, he was probably appointed by Sulla. In late 81 he defected to Sertorius amidst his rebellion, probably after being proscribed. He was one of the conspirators in Sertorius' assassination in 73.
- Fabius, perhaps tribune of the plebs in 64 BC. He might have carried a bill reducing the number of attendants a candidate could bring with him at an election.
- Gaius Fabius, tribune of the plebs in 55 BC, passed a law complementing Caesar's agrarian law. He served under Caesar as a legate from 54 to 49 BC, during the second half of the Gallic Wars and at the start of the Civil War.
- Quintus Fabius Sanga, warned Cicero about the conspiracy of Catiline, after being informed by the ambassadors of the Allobroges.
- Quintus Fabius Vergilianus, legate of Appius Claudius Pulcher in Cilicia in 51 BC; during the Civil War, he espoused the cause of Pompeius.
- Publius Fabius Blandus, named in a sepulchral inscription from Firmum Picenum, dating between the late first century BC and the first half of the first century AD.
- Fabia P. f. Pollitta, probably the daughter of Publius Fabius Blandus, named in the same inscription from Firmum Picenum.
- Fabia P. l. Bassa, the freedwoman of Publius Fabius Blandus, named in the same inscription from Firmum Picenum.
- Publius Fabius Firmanus, consul suffectus in the early years of the reign of the emperor Claudius.
- Fabius Rusticus, a historian of the mid-first century AD, frequently quoted by Tacitus on the life of Nero.
- Fabius Fabullus, legate of Legio V Alaudae, chosen as a leader of the soldiers who mutinied against Aulus Caecina Alienus in AD 69; perhaps the same man to whom the murder of the emperor Galba was attributed.
- Gaius Fabius Valens, one of the principal generals of Vitellius, and consul suffectus ex kal. Sept. in AD 69.
- Fabius Priscus, one of the legates sent against Civilis in AD 70.
- Fabius Ululitremulus, a shopkeeper in Pompeii. A graffito from the doorpost of his shop alludes to the Aeneid, and praises Minerva as the patron of the fullones.
- Marcus Fabius Rufus, the last owner of a rich villa in Pompeii.
- Marcus Fabius Quintilianus, the most celebrated of Roman rhetoricians, granted the insignia and title of consul by Domitian.
- Lucius Fabius Tuscus, consul suffectus in 100.
- Lucius Fabius Justus, a distinguished rhetorician, and a friend of both Tacitus and the younger Pliny.
- Lucius Julius Gainius Fabius Agrippa. A Roman descendant of the Herodian dynasty, gymnasiarch of Apamea and one of the most prominent citizens of the city in the 110s. Possibly an ancestor to usurper Jotapianus, though it is unclear if the initial "F." in Jotapianus' name stands for "Fabius".
- Ceionia Fabia, an adoptive granddaughter of Hadrian, and sister of the emperor Lucius Verus. Her name indicates descent from the gens Fabia, though her ancestry is obscure.
- Quintus Fabius Catullinus, consul in AD 130.
- Fabius Cornelius Repentinus, appointed praefectus praetorio in the reign of Antoninus Pius.
- Fabius Mela, an eminent jurist, probably of the mid-2nd century.
- Lucius Fabius Cilo Septimianus, consul suffectus in AD 193 and consul in 204.
- Fabius Sabinus, one of the consiliarii of Alexander Severus, perhaps the same Sabinus later driven out of Rome by order of Elagabalus.
- Fabia Orestilla, supposedly the wife of Gordian I, and mother of his children. Her name appears only in the Augustan History.
- Quintus Fabius Clodius Agrippianus Celsinus, Proconsul of Caria in 249.
- Fabianus, Pope from 236 to 250. Supposedly of noble Roman birth, his father's name was reportedly Fabius.
- Titus Fabius Titianus, consul in AD 337.
- Aconia Fabia Paulina, a pagan priestess during the late fourth century, wife of Vettius Agorius Praetextatus.
- Saint Fabiola, a Christian ascetic of the late fourth century, she was later declared a saint.
- Quintus Fabius Memmius Symmachus, a politician of the late fourth and early fifth century, who was appointed Quaestor at the age of ten. Possibly a pagan, he was alleged to have built a temple to Flora.
- Fabius Planciades Fulgentius, a Latin grammarian, probably not earlier than the sixth century.
- Fabia Eudocia, first empress-consort of the Byzantine emperor Heraclius. She was born in the Exarchate of Africa, and died in AD 612, reportedly due to epilepsy. One of her two known children was Constantine III.

== See also ==
- List of Roman gentes

== Bibliography ==
=== Ancient sources ===
- Marcus Tullius Cicero, Brutus, Cato Maior de Senectute, De Natura Deorum, De Officiis, De Oratore, Epistulae ad Brutum, Epistulae ad Familiares, In Pisonem, In Vatinium Testem, In Verrem, Philippicae, Pro Balbo, Pro Caelio, Pro Murena, Tusculanae Quaestiones.
- Gaius Julius Caesar, (attributed), De Bello Hispaniensis (On the War in Spain).
- Gaius Sallustius Crispus (Sallust), Bellum Catilinae (The Conspiracy of Catiline).
- Diodorus Siculus, Bibliotheca Historica (Library of History).
- Sextus Aurelius Propertius, Elegiae (Elegies).
- Quintus Horatius Flaccus (Horace), Epistulae (Letters).
- Dionysius of Halicarnassus, Romaike Archaiologia (Roman Antiquities).
- Titus Livius (Livy), History of Rome.
- Publius Ovidius Naso (Ovid), Fasti, Ex Ponto (From Pontus).
- Marcus Velleius Paterculus, Compendium of Roman History.
- Valerius Maximus, Factorum ac Dictorum Memorabilium (Memorable Facts and Sayings).
- Lucius Annaeus Seneca (Seneca the Younger), Epistulae Morales ad Lucilium (Moral Letters to Lucilius).
- Gaius Plinius Secundus (Pliny the Elder), Naturalis Historia (Natural History).
- Gaius Plinius Caecilius Secundus (Pliny the Younger), Epistulae (Letters).
- Sextus Julius Frontinus, Strategemata (Stratagems).
- Publius Cornelius Tacitus, Historiae, De Vita et Moribus Iulii Agricolae (On the Life and Mores of Julius Agricola), Dialogus de Oratoribus (Dialogue on Oratory).
- Lucius Mestrius Plutarchus (Plutarch), Lives of the Noble Greeks and Romans.
- Gaius Suetonius Tranquillus, De Viris Illustribus.
- Decimus Junius Juvenalis, Satirae (Satires).
- Aulus Gellius, Noctes Atticae (Attic Nights).
- Appianus Alexandrinus (Appian), Bellum Civile (The Civil War), Hispanica (The Spanish Wars), Iberica.
- Sextus Pompeius Festus, Epitome de M. Verrio Flacco de Verborum Significatu (Epitome of Marcus Verrius Flaccus: On the Meaning of Words).
- Lucius Cassius Dio Cocceianus (Cassius Dio), Roman History.
- Aelius Lampridius, Aelius Spartianus, Flavius Vopiscus, Julius Capitolinus, Trebellius Pollio, and Vulcatius Gallicanus, Historia Augusta (Augustan History).
- Sextus Aurelius Victor (attributed), De Origo Gentis Romanae (On the Origin of the Roman People), De Viris Illustribus (On Famous Men), Epitome de Caesaribus (Epitome of the Lives of the Caesars).
- Eutropius, Breviarium Historiae Romanae (Abridgement of the History of Rome).
- Paulus Orosius, Historiarum Adversum Paganos (History Against the Pagans).
- Digesta seu Pandectae (The Digest).
- Paulus Diaconus, Epitome de Sex. Pompeio Festo de Significatu Verborum (Epitome of Festus' De Significatu Verborum), ed. Karl Otfried Müller.
- Joannes Zonaras, Epitome Historiarum (Epitome of History).

=== Modern sources ===
- Joseph Hilarius Eckhel, Doctrina Numorum Veterum (The Study of Ancient Coins, 1792–1798).
- Barthold Georg Niebuhr, The History of Rome, Julius Charles Hare and Connop Thirlwall, trans., John Smith, Cambridge (1828).
- Wilhelm Adolf Becker, Handbuch der Römischen Alterhümer (Handbook of Roman Antiquities), Weidmannsche Buchhandlung, Leipzig (1846).
- Karl Wilhelm Göttling, Geschichte der Römischen Staatsverfassung von Erbauung der Stadt bis zu C. Cäsar's Tod (History of the Roman State from the Founding of the City to the Death of Caesar), Buchhandlung des Waisenhauses, Halle (1840).
- Dictionary of Greek and Roman Biography and Mythology, William Smith, ed., Little, Brown and Company, Boston (1849).
- Theodor Mommsen et alii, Corpus Inscriptionum Latinarum (The Body of Latin Inscriptions, abbreviated CIL), Berlin-Brandenburgische Akademie der Wissenschaften (1853–present).
- Notizie degli Scavi di Antichità (News of Excavations from Antiquity), Accademia dei Lincei (1876–present).
- August Pauly, Georg Wissowa, et alii, Realencyclopädie der Classischen Altertumswissenschaft, J. B. Metzler, Stuttgart (1894–1980).
- George Davis Chase, "The Origin of Roman Praenomina", in Harvard Studies in Classical Philology, vol. VIII, pp. 103–184 (1897).
- Paul von Rohden, Elimar Klebs, & Hermann Dessau, Prosopographia Imperii Romani (The Prosopography of the Roman Empire, abbreviated PIR), Berlin (1898).
- Friedrich Münzer, Roman Aristocratic Parties and Families, translated by Thérèse Ridley, Johns Hopkins University Press, 1999 (originally published in 1920).
- Inscriptiones Christianae Urbis Romae (Christian Inscriptions from the City of Rome), New Series, Rome (1922–present).
- Stéphane Gsell, Inscriptions Latines de L'Algérie (Latin Inscriptions from Algeria), Edouard Champion, Paris (1922–present).
- T. Robert S. Broughton, The Magistrates of the Roman Republic, American Philological Association (1952).
- Attilio Degrassi, Inscriptiones Latinae Liberae Rei Publicae (abbreviated ILLRP), Florence (1957–1963).
- Lily Ross Taylor, The Voting Districts of the Roman Republic, University of Michigan Press (1960).
- D.P. Simpson, Cassell's Latin and English Dictionary, Macmillan Publishing Company, New York (1963).
- Robert Maxwell Ogilvie, Commentary on Livy, books 1–5, Oxford, Clarendon Press, 1965.
- Graham Vincent Sumner, The Orators in Cicero's Brutus: Prosopography and Chronology, (Phoenix Supplementary Volume XI.), Toronto and Buffalo, University of Toronto Press (1973).
- Michael Crawford, Roman Republican Coinage, Cambridge University Press (1974, 2001).
- Christoph Konrad, "Some Friends of Sertorius", in The American Journal of Philology, vol. 108, No. 3 (1987).
- J. A. Crook, F. W. Walbank, M. W. Frederiksen, R. M. Ogilvie (editors), The Cambridge Ancient History, vol. VIII, Rome and the Mediterranean to 133 B.C., Cambridge University Press, 1989.
- Ronald Syme, The Augustan Aristocracy, Clarendon Press, Oxford (1989).
- Giuseppe Camodeca, "Novità sui fasti consolari delle tavolette cerate della Campania", Publications de l'École française de Rome, vol. 143 (1991).
- T. J. Cornell, The Beginnings of Rome, London and New York, Routledge, 1995.
- Francis X. Ryan, Rank and Participation in the Republican Senate, Stuttgart, Franz Steiner Verlag, 1998.
- Sander M. Goldberg, Constructing Literature in the Roman Republic, Poetry and its Reception, Cambridge University Press, 2005.
- C. J. Smith, The Roman Clan: the Gens from Ancient Ideology to Modern Anthropology, Cambridge University Press (2006), ISBN 978-0-521-85692-8.
- Léon Homo, Roman Political Institutions, Routledge (2013), ISBN 978-1-136-19811-3.
