= Marcus Fabius Ambustus =

Marcus Fabius Ambustus may refer to:

- Marcus Fabius Ambustus (pontifex maximus 390 BC)
- Marcus Fabius Ambustus (consular tribune 381 BC)
- Marcus Fabius Ambustus (consul 360 BC)
- Marcus Fabius Ambustus, magister equitum in 322 B.C.
