= Quintus Fabius Ambustus =

Quintus Fabius Ambustus may refer to several ancient Romans, including:

- Quintus Fabius Ambustus, consul 412 BC; see Fabius Ambustus
- Quintus Fabius Ambustus (tribune), consular tribune in 390 BCE
- Quintus Fabius Ambustus (dictator), dictator in 321 BCE
