= Fabius Ambustus =

Fabius Ambustus was a name used by ancient Roman men from a branch of the gens Fabia, including:

- Quintus Fabius Ambustus, consul 412 BC; son of Quintus, grandson of Marcus
- Caeso Fabius Ambustus, quaestor 409 BC, four-time military tribune with consular powers (404, 401, 395 390), legate 398 and 39; son of Marcus, grandson of Quintus
- Numerius Fabius Ambustus (praenomen possibly Gnaeus instead), military tribune with consular powers in 406 and 390, legatus in 398 and 391; son of Marcus, grandson of Quintus
- Quintus Fabius Ambustus, legate 391, military tribune with consular powers 390; son of Marcus, grandson of Quintus
- Marcus Fabius Ambustus, military tribune with consular powers 381 and 369, censor in 363; son of the four-time consular tribune
- Gaius Fabius Ambustus, consul 358 BC, interrex 355; son of Numerius, and grandson of Marcus
- Quintus Fabius Ambustus, magister equitum 344, dictator 321
- Marcus Fabius Ambustus, three-time consul (360, 356, 354 BC,) interrex 356 and 351 (possibly again in 340), dictator 351, possibly one of the tres viri ad col. deduc. in 334, princeps senatus at an unknown date; son of Numerius, grandson of Marcus
- Marcus Fabius Ambustus, Magister Equitum 322, but possibly to be identified with the three-time consul
- Gaius Fabius Ambustus, suffect Magister Equitum 315, son of Marcus, and grandson of Numerius

== Sources ==
- * T.R.S. Broughton, The Magistrates of the Roman Republic (American Philological Association, 1952), vol. 2, p. 562.
