= Numerius Fabius Pictor =

Numerius Fabius Pictor may refer to:

- Numerius Fabius Pictor (antiquarian)
- Numerius Fabius Pictor (consul)
