= Quintus Fabius Maximus =

Quintus Fabius Maximus may refer to:

- Quintus Fabius Maximus (consul 213 BC), Roman senator
- Quintus Fabius Maximus (consul 45 BC), Roman senator
- Quintus Fabius Maximus Aemilianus, Roman senator
- Quintus Fabius Maximus Allobrogicus, Roman senator
- Quintus Fabius Maximus Eburnus, Roman senator
- Quintus Fabius Maximus Gurges (consul 292 BC), Roman senator
- Quintus Fabius Maximus Gurges (consul 265 BC), Roman senator
- Quintus Fabius Maximus Rullianus, Roman general
- Quintus Fabius Maximus Servilianus (consul 142 BC), Roman senator and priest; adoptive son of QFM Aemilianus
- Quintus Fabius Maximus Verrucosus ("Cunctator") (d. 203 BC), Roman general, two-time dictator
