= Flaig =

Flaig is a surname. Notable people with the surname include:

- Egon Flaig (born 1949), German ancient historian and public intellectual
- Markus Flaig (born 1971), German bass-baritone
