= Gnaeus Ogulnius =

Gnaeus Ogulnius was a Roman politician in the early 3rd century BC. He served as tribunus plebis in 300 BC and as aedilis curulis in 296.

He was a member of the plebeian gens Ogulnia. Livy accused Gnaeus and his brother, Quintus Ogulnius, of cravenly pandering to the lower classes with their proposal to increase the number of high priests and priests of the augurs, and to allow plebes to hold these offices for the first time (the proposal was dubbed the "Ogulnia Law"). During their career, they combated usury.

He was aedile in 296 BC when the brothers erected a statue of the divine twins Romulus and Remus under the she-wolf on the site of Rome's Sacred Fig Tree.
