= Quintus Fabius Maximus Gurges =

Marcus Quintus Fabius Maximus Gurges may refer to:

- Quintus Fabius Maximus Gurges (consul 292 BC), Roman consul in 292 and 276 BC
- Quintus Fabius Maximus Gurges (consul 265 BC), son of the previous, Roman consul in 265 BC
