= Ambustus =

Ambustus is Latin for "burnt", and may refer to:

- Caeso Fabius Ambustus (fl. 404–390), Roman senator
- Gaius Fabius Ambustus (consul) (fl. 358 BC), Roman senator
- Gaius Fabius Ambustus (magister equitum 315 BC), Roman senator
- Marcus Fabius Ambustus (pontifex maximus 390 BC)
- Marcus Fabius Ambustus (consular tribune 381 BC), Roman senator
- Marcus Fabius Ambustus (consul 360 BC), Roman senator
- Marcus Fabius Ambustus (magister equitum 322 BC), Roman senator
- Numerius Fabius Ambustus(fl. 406–390 BC), Roman senator
- Quintus Fabius Ambustus (tribune) (fl. 390 BC)
- Quintus Fabius Ambustus (dictator) (fl. 321 BC), Roman politician
