= Quintus Ogulnius Gallus =

Ancient Roman politician

Quintus Ogulnius Gallus was a Roman politician in the fourth and third centuries BC.

== Career ==
As Tribune of the Plebs together with his brother Gnaeus Ogulnius Gallus in 300 BC, he created the Lex Ogulnia, a law that opened the priesthoods to plebeians. The Collegium Pontificum was extended to nine Pontificates, four of which belonged to the plebeians. The number of Augurs was also extended to nine, five of them being plebeians.

He became famous for sending an embassy to Epidaurus in 292 BC. The reason for the embassy was a severe epidemic that had been raging in Rome for several years, which, according to the instructions of the Sibylline Books, could only be defeated by obtaining the blessing of Asclepius, whose shrine was in Epidaurus. Ogulnius Gallus was said to have brought the god on his ship in the form of a snake. In Rome, the snake has swum from the ship to the Tiber Island, where a sanctuary was then built for Asclepius and thus the plague ended.

In 273 BC, he participated in the embassy led by Quintus Fabius Maximus Gurges to the Egyptian king Ptolemy II, with which Rome and Egypt made diplomatic contact for the first time.

In 269 BC, he served as consul with Gaius Fabius Pictor as his colleague. His main achievement was the introduction of silver currency into Rome. The first silver coins minted in southern Italy showed Romulus and Remus. The silver coins, created in the Hellenistic style, favoured the rise of Rome as an important trading centre of the ancient world.

== See also ==
- Ogulnia gens
