= Ogulnia gens =

Ancient Roman family

The gens Ogulnia was an ancient plebeian family at ancient Rome. The gens first came to prominence at the beginning of the third century BC, when the brothers Quintus and Gnaeus Ogulnius, tribunes of the plebs, carried a law opening most of the Roman priesthoods to the plebeians. The only member of the family to obtain the consulship was Quintus Ogulnius Gallus in 269 BC. However, Ogulnii are still found in imperial times.

== Praenomina ==
The only praenomina known to have been used by the early Ogulnii were Quintus, Gnaeus, Lucius, and Marcus, although in a filiation from the Fasti Capitolini the ancestor of the Ogulnii Galli may have been named Aulus. The later Ogulnii used all of these, as well as Numerius, and there are examples of Publius and Titus as well.

== Branches and cognomina ==
The only cognomen of the Ogulnii under the Republic is Gallus, which signified a cockerel, or a Gaul. The other Ogulnii mentioned in history had no surnames.

== Members ==
This list includes abbreviated praenomina. For an explanation of this practice, see filiation.

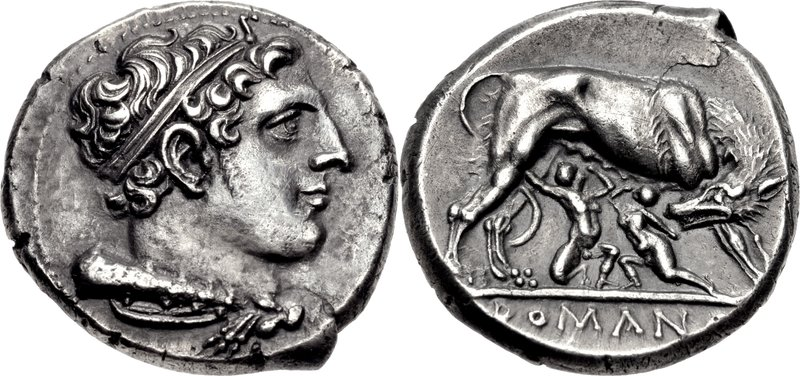
Didrachm minted in Rome between 269 and 266 BC. Hercules is pictured on the obverse, while the reverse features the statue of the She-wolf suckling Twins erected by Quintus and Gnaeus Ogulnius during their aedileship in 296 BC.

=== Early Ogulnii ===
- Quintus Ogulnius, tribune of the plebs in 300 BC, together with his brother, Gnaeus, proposed the law opening the various Roman priesthoods to the plebeians. As curule aediles in 296, they collected fines from those who violated the usury laws, which they used to build various public works, including a statue of the She-wolf suckling the Twins on the site of the Ficus Ruminalis. Quintus was one of the emissaries sent to Epidaurus in 292, and to Ptolemy II Philadelphus of Egypt in 273. (Note: Broughton considers the ambassador of 273 to be the same as the consul of 269.)
- Gnaeus Ogulnius, as tribune of the plebs in 300 BC, helped pass the lex Ogulnia, and in 296 used the proceeds of fines for usury to build various public works.
- Lucius Ogulnius Q. f., father of the consul Quintus Ogulnius Gallus.
- Quintus Ogulnius L. f. Q. n. Gallus, (Note: Following the Fasti Capitolini, Broughton gives Aulus as the name of the consul's grandfather.) consul in 269 BC, had the conduct of the war against the Picentes. During the same year, silver coinage was minted for the first time at Rome. In 257, when both of the consuls were engaged during the First Punic War, Ogulnius was nominated dictator in order to hold the Feriae Latinae.
- Marcus Ogulnius, one of the ambassadors sent to Etruria in 210 BC, during the Second Punic War. His mission was to purchase grain for the Roman garrison at Tarentum, which was besieged by Hannibal's forces.
- Marcus Ogulnius, one of the military tribunes of the second legion, in 196 BC. He was slain in battle against the Boii.
- Marcus Ogulnius Gallus, praetor urbanus in 182 BC.

=== Others ===
- Ogulnia, used as an example by Juvenal, of a genteel matron who would spare no expense to visit the public games, and lavish gifts on a handsome young athlete.
- Gaius Ogulnius M. f., buried at Philippi, aged seven.
- Marcus Ogulnius, named in an inscription from Rome.
- Numerius Ogulnius Abscantus, husband of Ogulnia Hilara and father of Numerius Ogulnius Rhodo, buried at Rome, aged fifty.
- Lucius Ogulnius L. l. Aeschinus, a freedman named in an inscription from Nomentum.
- Ogulnia L. l. Aeschinus, a freedman named in an inscription from Nomentum.
- Marcus Ogulnius Agathemer, buried at Rome, aged twenty-five.
- Aulus Ogulnius Auctus, named in an inscription from Rome recording a purchase.
- Ogulnia N. l. Auge, a freedwoman, named in an inscription from Rome.
- Aulus Ogulnius Atimetus, husband of Ogulnia Tyche, buried at Rome.
- Gaius Ogulnius C. l. Ciratus, a freedman, buried at Narbo.
- Numerius Ogulnius N. l. Dinaeus, a freedman, named in an inscription from Rome.
- Aulus Ogulnius Epagathus, named in an inscription found near Rome.
- Quintus Ogulnius Epagathus, named in an inscription from Ostia.
- Aulus Ogulnius Epaphra, named in an inscription from Rome recording a purchase.
- Marcus Ogulnius Eros, dedicated a monument at Rome to his wife, Vetilia.
- Publius Ogulnius Eutychus, named in an inscription from Minturnae in Latium.
- Ogulnius Felix, possibly a slave, mentioned in an inscription dating from the early Empire.
- Ogulnius Felix, together with his aunt, Livia Amaryllis, dedicated a monument at Rome to his mother, Ogulnia Successa.
- Ogulnia L. l. Fortunata, a freedwoman named in an inscription from Nomentum.
- Numerius Ogulnius Fortunatus, dedicated a monument at Rome to his son, Numerius.
- Numerius Ogulnius N. f. Fortunatus, buried at Rome, aged eight years, six months.
- Marcus Ogulnius Fructus, son of Mnester and Secunda, buried at Rome, aged ten years, seven months, and fourteen days.
- Numerius Ogulnius Hermes, husband of Ogulnia Proba, to whom he dedicated a monument at Antium.
- Ogulnia Hilara, wife of Numerius Ogulnius Abscantus, and mother of Numerius Ogulnius Rhodo, with whom she dedicated a monument at Rome to her husband.
- Ogulnia Hilara, buried at Narbo.
- Marcus Ogulnius Justus, dedicated a monument at Rome to his son, Marcus.
- Marcus Ogulnius M. f. Justus, buried at Rome, aged fifteen years, two months, and twenty-two days.
- Marcus Ogulnius Menophanes, buried at Rome.
- Numerius Ogulnius Menophilus, named in an inscription from Rome.
- Ogulnia Cn. l. Nice, a freedwoman named in an inscription from Rome.
- Gnaeus Ogulnius Cn. l. Nicephorus, a freedman named in an inscription from Rome.
- Lucius Ogulnius Aeschini l. Philea, a freedman named in an inscription from Nomentum.
- Lucius Ogulnius L. l. Philemo, a freedman mentioned in an inscription from Nomentum.
- Lucius Ogulnius Pupillae l. Philonicus, a freedman named in an inscription from Rome.
- Ogulnia Proba, wife of Numerius Ogulnius Hermes, buried at Rome.
- Marcus Ogulnius Proclus, buried at Rome, aged thirteen years, two months, eight days, and three hours.
- Titus Ogulnius Receptus, a freedman, named in an inscription from Rome.
- Numerius Ogulnius N. f. Rhodo, the son of Numerius Ogulnius Abscantus and Ogulnia Hilara, dedicated a monument at Rome to his father.
- Marcus Ogulnius M. l. Rufio, a freedman buried at Rome.
- Marcus Ogulnius M. f. Rufus, named in an inscription from Rome.
- Ogulnius C. f. Saxo, named in an inscription from Nomentum.
- Ogulnius Asandrae f. Sostras, named in an inscription from Nomentum.
- Ogulnia Successa, sister of Livia Amaryllis and mother of Ogulnius Felix, buried at Rome.
- Marcus Ogulnius Tiro, mentioned in an inscription from Knodara on Cyprus.
- Ogulnia Tyche, wife of Aulus Ogulnius Atimetus, buried at Rome.

== See also ==
- List of Roman gentes

== Bibliography ==
- Titus Livius (Livy), History of Rome.
- Publius Ovidius Naso (Ovid), Metamorphoses.
- Valerius Maximus, Factorum ac Dictorum Memorabilium (Memorable Facts and Sayings).
- Gaius Plinius Secundus (Pliny the Elder), Naturalis Historia (Natural History).
- Marcus Junianus Justinus (Justin), Epitome de Cn. Pompeio Trogo Historiarum Philippicarum et Totius Mundi Originum et Terrae Situs (Epitome of Trogus' Philippic History and Origin of the Whole World and all of its Places).
- Lucius Cassius Dio Cocceianus (Cassius Dio), Roman History.
- Sextus Aurelius Victor, De Viris Illustribus (On Famous Men).
- Eutropius, Breviarium Historiae Romanae (Abridgement of the History of Rome).
- Paulus Orosius, Historiarum Adversum Paganos (History Against the Pagans).
- Dictionary of Greek and Roman Biography and Mythology, William Smith, ed., Little, Brown and Company, Boston (1849).
- Theodor Mommsen et alii, Corpus Inscriptionum Latinarum (The Body of Latin Inscriptions, abbreviated CIL), Berlin-Brandenburgische Akademie der Wissenschaften (1853–present).
- George Davis Chase, "The Origin of Roman Praenomina", in Harvard Studies in Classical Philology, vol. VIII (1897).
- Paul von Rohden, Elimar Klebs, & Hermann Dessau, Prosopographia Imperii Romani (The Prosopography of the Roman Empire, abbreviated PIR), Berlin (1898).
- T. Robert S. Broughton, The Magistrates of the Roman Republic, American Philological Association (1952).
- Zeitschrift für Papyrologie und Epigraphik (Journal of Papyrology and Epigraphy, abbreviated ZPE), Rudolf Habelt, Bonn (1967–present).
- Michael Crawford, Roman Republican Coinage, Cambridge University Press (1974, 2001).
- Peter Pilhofer, Philippi, Band 2: Katalog der Inschriften von Philippi (Catalog of Inscriptions from Philippi, abbreviated Philippi), Tübingen (2nd Edition, 2009).
