= Uwe Walter =

German ancient historian (born 1962)

Uwe Walter (born 23 October 1962 in Rotenburg an der Fulda) is a German historian specialising in ancient history.

Walter studied history, Latin and Greek at Göttingen und Erlangen from 1983. In 1992 he received a doctorate from Göttingen with a work on citizen rights in Archaic Greece. He subsequently completed a teaching certificate and was employed until 1997 in the school system. In that year he was appointed as a senior instructor in the faculty of the department of ancient history at the Institute for Ancient World Studies at the University of Cologne. In 2001 he received a research grant from the Gerda Henkel Foundation and he was habilitated in 2003 at Cologne with a work on the Historical culture of the Roman Republic. In 2004 he was appointed Professor of General History with special consideration of ancient history at Bielefeld University. He refused appointments at Mainz University (2009) and Göttingen University (2010).

Walter mainly focusses on Greek history in the archaic and classical periods, the Roman Republic, ancient historiography and science. As of 2010 he is an editor of Historische Zeitschrift. From 2009 to 2012 he produced a blog, "Antike und Abendland" (Antiquity and the West) for FAZ.

Walter remains closely linked to the school system. He worked in the Union of German History Teachers and is an editor of the union's journal geschichte für heute (history for today).

== Selected publications ==
- An der Polis teilhaben. Bürgerstaat und Zugehörigkeit im Archaischen Griechenland [Taking Part in the Polis. Citizen State and Belonging in Archaic Greece]. Stuttgart 1993, ISBN 3-515-06370-6.
- as editor M. Valerius Martialis Epigramme [Epigrams of M. Valerius Martial]. Schöningh, Paderborn 1996. ISBN 3-8252-1954-2.
- Abitur-Wissen Geschichte: Die Antike [High School Knowledge History: Antiquity]. Stark, Freising 2000, 2nd Edition 2004, ISBN 3-89449-420-4.
- Editor with Hans Beck: Die Frühen Römischen Historiker I. Von Fabius Pictor bis Cn. Gellius [The Early Roman Historians I: From Fabius Pictor to Gn. Gellius] (Texte zur Forschung, Vol. 76). Wissenschaftliche Buchgesellschaft, Darmstadt 2001, ISBN 3-534-14757-X (E-book edition 2003; 2nd revised edition 2005, ISBN 3-534-19048-3).
- Editor with Hans Beck: Die Frühen Römischen Historiker II. Von Coelius Antipater bis Pomponius Atticus [The Early Roman Historians II: From Coelius Antipater to Pomponius Atticus] (Texte zur Forschung, Vol. 77). Wissenschaftliche Buchgesellschaft, Darmstadt 2004, ISBN 3-534-14758-8.
- Memoria und res publica. Zur Geschichtskultur der römischen Republik [Memoria and Res Publica: On the Historical Culture of the Roman Republic]. Verlag Antike, Frankfurt 2004, ISBN 3-938032-00-6.
- with Markus Sehlmeyer. Unberührt von jedem Umbruch? Der Althistoriker Ernst Hohl zwischen Kaiserreich und früher DDR [Untouched by any Upheaval? The Ancient Historian Ernst Hohl between Empire and the Early GDR]. Verlag Antike, Frankfurt 2005, ISBN 3-938032-08-1.
- with Peter Scholz. Fragmente römischer Memoiren [Fragments of Roman Memoirs]. Studien zur alten Geschichte, vol. 18. Verlag Antike, Heidelberg 2013, ISBN 978-3-938032-59-6.
- Politische Ordnung in der Römischen Republik [Political structure in the Roman Republic]. Oldenbourg, Berlin/Boston 2017, ISBN 978-3-486-59696-0.
- Antike über den Tag hinaus: Bücher - Köpfe - Themen [Antiquity beyond the present day: books, minds, topics]. Rezeption der Antike, vol. 5. Verlag Antike, Heidelberg 2017, ISBN 978-3-946317-13-5.
- with Raimund Schulz. Griechische Geschichte ca. 800–322 v. Chr. [Greek History, ca 800-322 BC]. 2 volumes. De Gruyter, Berlin/Boston 2022, ISBN 978-3-11-078272-1.
- Hellas und das große Ganze. Die alten Griechen in „Weltgeschichten“ zwischen Geschichtswissenschaft, Buchverlagen und historischer Bildung [Hellas and the big picture. The ancient Greeks in ‘world histories’ between historical scholarship, book publishing and historical education]. Studien zur alten Geschichte, vol. 36. Verlag Antike, Göttingen 2023, ISBN 978-3-949189-72-2.
