= Marcus Fabius Ambustus (pontifex maximus 390 BC) =

Pontifex Maximus of the Roman Republic (390 BC)

Marcus Fabius Ambustus was Pontifex Maximus of the Roman Republic in the year that Rome was taken by the Gauls of Brennus, 390 BC. His three sons--Caeso, Numerius, and Quintus—were sent as ambassadors to the Gauls, when the latter were besieging Clusium, and participated in an attack against the besieging Gauls. The Gauls demanded that the Fabii should be surrendered to them for violating the law of nations; and upon the senate refusing to give up the guilty parties, they marched against Rome, which they sacked after the battle of the Allia. The three sons were in the same year elected consular tribunes.

Many scholars believe the entire story of the events at Clusium to be fiction, as Clusium had no real reason to appeal to Rome for help, and the Gauls needed no real provocation to sack Rome. The story, it is hypothesized, exists to provide an explanation for an otherwise unmotivated attack on Rome, and to depict Rome as a bulwark of Italy against the Gauls.

== See also ==
- Ambustus, for other men with the same cognomen
- Fabius Ambustus, for other men who used the same combination of gens name and cognomen
- Fabia gens, for a comprehensive list of gens members
