= Gaius Fabius Pictor =

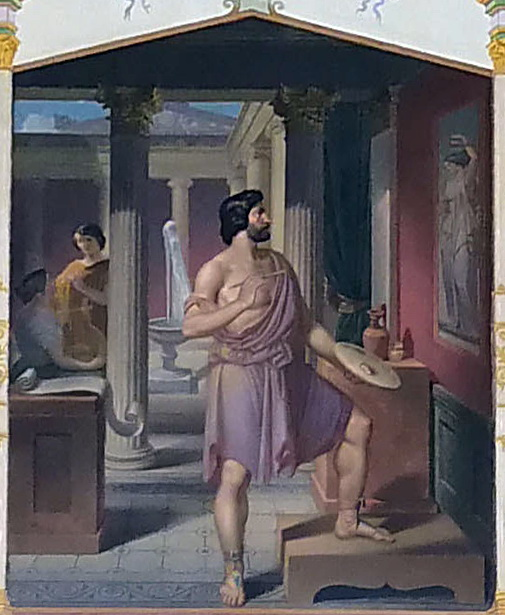
19th-century fresco depicting Pictor at works (Hermitage, Russia)

Gaius Fabius Pictor (fl. 304 BC) was an early Roman painter. According to later writers he was the earliest one; no other painter appears in written records for 150 years.

Fabius, called Pictor, was descended from the celebrated Fabia gens, and was the grandfather of the Roman historian Quintus Fabius Pictor. In 304 BC, Pictor decorated the Temple of Salus on the Quirinal Hill, with a representation of the victory of Bubulcus over the Samnites. His paintings were preserved until the reign of Caligula, when the temple was destroyed by fire according to Pliny.

Italian painting in this era was dominated by the Etruscan style, which used a flat polychromatic treatment. Painting was then little respected by the Romans, and the title of Pictor was not considered as an honourable distinction, but rather intended to stigmatize the artist, as may be inferred from a passage of Cicero, in his Tusculan Disputations: "Do we imagine that if it had been considered commendable in Fabius, a man of the highest rank, to paint, we should not have had many Polycleti and Parrhasii."

== Sources ==
- World Book Encyclopedia. Vol. F, p. 2.

Attribution:
