= Quintus Fabius Ambustus (tribune) =

Early 4th-century BC Roman politician and soldier

Quintus Fabius Ambustus (flourished early 4th century BC) was a military leader of the Roman Republic, and the son of Marcus Fabius Ambustus. In 390 BC, when his father was pontifex maximus, he and his two brothers, Numerius and Caeso, were sent as emissaries to a Gaulish army besieging Clusium. Instead of entering into negotiations, however, the three Fabii gathered their forces and aided the citizens of Clusium in an attack against the Gauls, in which Quintus Fabius himself was said to have killed one of the Gaulish leaders.

Outraged, the Gauls demanded that the senate hand over the three brothers for violating "the law of nations". Instead, all three were honored by election as consular tribunes. Further incensed, the Gauls marched on Rome, defeated the Roman Army in the Battle of the Allia, and sacked the city. In 389 BC he was supposed to have been prosecuted for his actions at Clusium, but died before the trial could take place.

Many scholars believe the entire story of the events at Clusium to be fiction, as Clusium had no real reason to appeal to Rome for help, and the Gauls needed no real provocation to sack Rome. The story, it is hypothesized, exists to provide an explanation for an otherwise unmotivated attack on Rome, and to depict Rome as a bulwark of Italy against the Gauls.

== In popular culture ==
Quintus Fabius Ambustus was played by Tony Kendall in the 1963 film Brennus, Enemy of Rome.

== See also ==
- Ambustus, for other men with the same cognomen
- Fabius Ambustus, for other men who used the same combination of gens name and cognomen
- Fabia gens, for a comprehensive list of gens members

Political offices
Preceded by Lucius Lucretius Tricipitinus Flavus, Lucius Furius Medullinus VII; Servius Sulpicius Camerinus, Agrippa Furius Fusus, Lucius Aemilius Mamercinus, and Gaius Aemilius Mamercinus II	Roman consular tribune 390 BC with Quintus Sulpicius Longus, Caeso Fabius Ambustus IV, Quintus Servilius Fidenas IV, Numerius Fabius Ambustus II, and Publius Cornelius Maluginensis IV	Succeeded by Lucius Valerius Potitus Poplicola II, Aulus Manlius Capitolinus, Lucius Verginius Tricostus Esquilinus, Lucius Aemilius Mamercinus II, Publius Cornelius, and Lucius Postumius Albinus Regillensis
