= Egon Flaig =

German professor, historian, and writer

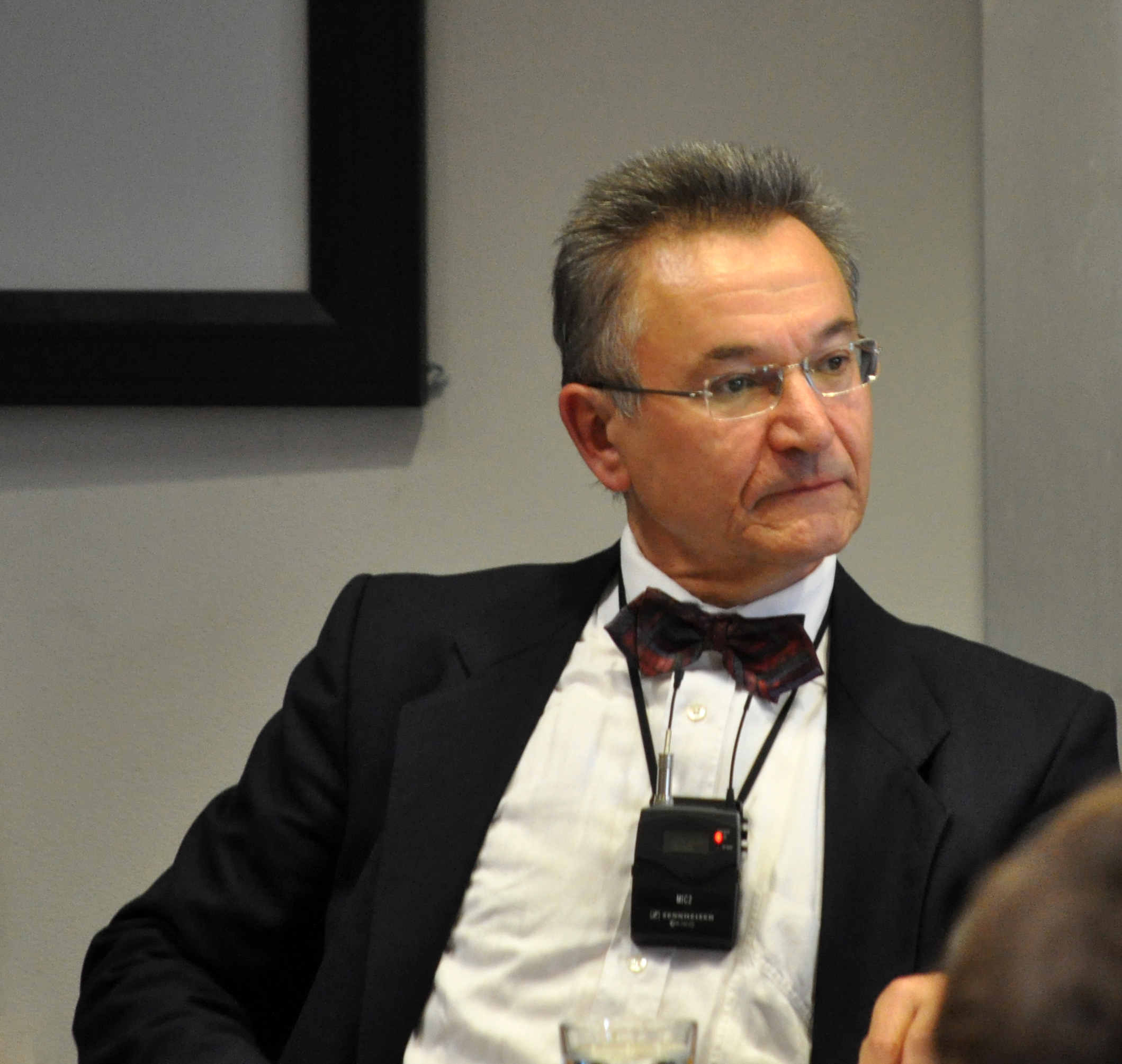
Egon Flaig in 2012

Egon Flaig (born 16 May 1949 in Gronau, Baden-Württemberg) is a German ancient historian and public intellectual, currently Emeritus Professor of Ancient History at the University of Rostock. Flaig's research has ranged from ancient Greek and Roman history to world-historical treatments of topics such as slavery and democracy. He has also been an active commentator on issues such as democracy, national identity, and religion, especially as pertaining to his home country.

== Education, career, and influences ==
From 1970 to 1976, Flaig studied history and romance languages and cultures in Stuttgart, Berlin, and Paris. He gained a doctorate in 1984, with a thesis on Jacob Burckhardt's Hellenism. After stints teaching in Freiburg, Göttingen, and Paris, Flaig became Professor of Ancient History at the University of Greifswald in 1998, moving to Rostock in 2008 and retiring in 2014.

In contrast to the empirical focus of the mainstream of German Altertumswissenschaft, Flaig's work has been called 'theory-oriented.' Important bodies of theory for Flaig include political sociology (especially as practiced by Pierre Bourdieu and Max Weber) and cultural anthropology. The distinctive approach to ancient history resulting from these influences has been described as 'a political anthropology of antiquity.'

== Significant works and reception ==
Flaig has published books on both Greek and Roman culture (for example, on the overthrow of Roman Emperors and on parricide in Athenian tragedy), as well as on later Humanism (especially Giovanni Boccaccio and Jacob Burckhardt). He has also produced a couple of global histories of particular topics.

His Weltgeschichte der Sklaverei ('A World History of Slavery') appeared in 2009. Flaig views slavery as an institution that emerged in several different cultures, in particular Islam, which he describes as 'the largest and longest-lasting slave-system in world history.' Uwe Walter praised the book for what he saw as its lack of moralism, its conceptual clarity, and it mass of historical detail. In 2013 Flaig published the 628 page long Die Mehrheitsentscheidung ('Majority Decision-Making'), a world-historical treatment of the topic that had been fifteen years in the making. For Flaig, majority decision-making is a necessary condition for democracy: 'without majority decision-making,' he states, there can be 'no democracy.' This leads Flaig to make a sharp distinction between democracy and consensus systems; democracy, in fact, should be viewed as 'a specific variant of dissensual decision-making.' Systems in which disagreement is possible, but in which the whole community feels bound by an eventual majority vote, obtain a greater capacity for effective action (what Flaig calls their 'Handlungsfähigkeit'). Flaig argues that a systematic use of majority decision-making emerged in only a small set of cultures, including pre-exilic Judaism, Buddhist India, ancient Greece and Rome, and medieval Iceland.

Several reviews of the book praised its scope, calling it 'a hugely impressive work' and 'a beast of a book.' James Kierstead labelled its publication 'a watershed moment in the study of the world history of democratic institutions.' At the same time, a number of reviewers criticized the book for having little to say ancient Greek democracy's exclusion of women, foreigners, and slaves. Some also took issue with what they saw as the book's reactionary politics, particularly with regard to Flaig's rejection of political pluralism and of consensual modes of decision-making.

== Political views and controversies ==
Flaig has argued that the crimes of National Socialism, abhorrent as they are, shouldn't be allowed to dominate Germany's conception of itself. Every generation, for Flaig, has a right to make its own choices about the future, unencumbered by the sins of its predecessors. Modern Germany, he believes, should be seen 'as an ordinary nation, without stigma.' These views have been criticized by historian Heinrich August Winkler, who accused Flaig of being an apologist for German nationalism.

In 2017, Flaig published Die Niederlage der politischen Vernunft (The End of Reason in the Public Sphere), in which he argues that the rise of political correctness has made rational discussion of important public issues such as immigration impossible, undermining an essential characteristic of liberal democratic societies.

== Publications ==
- Ritualisierte Politik : Zeichen, Gesten und Herrschaft im Alten Rom. Vandenhoeck & Ruprecht. 2003. ISBN 3-525-36700-7.
- Weltgeschichte der Sklaverei. Beck, München 2009, ISBN 978-3-406-58450-3
- Die Mehrheitsentscheidung. Entstehung und kulturelle Dynamik. F. Schöningh Verlag, Paderborn 2013, ISBN 978-3-506-77415-6.
- Warum weint der Feldherr?, Rezension von Uwe Walter, Frankfurter Allgemeine Zeitung, 12. September 2003
