= Quintus Fabius Pictor =

3rd-century BC Roman historian

- Born: c. 270 BC
- Died: c. 200 BC
- Occupation: Historian
- Notable work: Annales Graeci
- Father: Gaius Fabius Pictor
- Family: gens Fabia

Quintus Fabius Pictor (born c. 270 BC, fl. c. 215–200 BC) was the earliest known Roman historian. His history, written in Greek and now mostly lost besides some surviving fragments, was highly influential on ancient writers and certainly participated in introducing Greek historiographical methods to the Roman world. However, the work was highly partisan towards Rome, blaming the Second Punic War (218–201 BC) on Carthage and idealizing the Roman Republic as a well-ordered state loyal to its allies. Fabius probably served as praetor, was a member of the Senate, and participated in a delegation sent to the oracle at Delphi in 216 BC. Some scholars consider him one of the earliest annalists, although this conclusion has been criticized.

== Life ==
Quintus Fabius Pictor was born ca. 270 BC to a prestigious patrician family of the Roman Republic, the gens Fabia. The cognomen Pictor (Latin for 'painter') was inherited from his grandfather, Gaius Fabius Pictor, who had decorated the temple of Salus in 304. His father, Gaius Fabius Pictor, was consul in 269.

Fabius participated in Roman campaigns against the Gauls and the Ligurians in Cisalpine Gaul during the 230s. In 233, he was presumably a junior officer under the consulship of his cousin Quintus Fabius Maximus Verrucosus. He most likely served as praetor some time prior to 218. Fabius joined the Senate before the outbreak of the Second Punic War in 218, but seems to have been a rather undistinguished senator. He may have also fought in the Battle of Lake Trasimene in 217.

In 216 BC, during the Second Punic War, he was appointed to travel to the oracle at Delphi, the religious centre of Greece, in order to seek guidance after the disastrous Roman defeat to Hannibal at Cannae. He certainly obtained this role at the suggestion of his cousin Fabius Verrucosus, probably aided by his expert knowledge of the Greek language and culture, and possibly in his capacity as member of the decemviri sacris faciundis, although we have no direct evidence that he was a member of priestly colleges. It seems likely that Fabius was also sent there to sound out Greek public opinion regarding the alliance between Hannibal and Philip V of Macedon.

His later life remains unknown, and it is unclear whether Fabius lived long enough to witness the end of the Second Punic War (218–201 BC). Quintus Fabius Pictor, who was praetor in Sardinia in 189 and died in 167 BC, was presumably his homonymous son.

== Work ==
Fabius wrote a history of Rome some time between 215 and 200 BC. His work was certainly published before 192 BC, either during or shortly after the Second Punic War. Bruce W. Frier has proposed a publication date no later than 213. Fabius' history was written in Greek, which was at that time the only language suitable to reach a large educated public in Italy, Greece and elsewhere in the Mediterranean world. The Latin annales ascribed to a Fabius are thus most likely a later translation of his history, or perhaps a draft of his work in Latin later edited posthumously. In the words of Arnaldo Momigliano, "under the impact of Hellenisation the natives of many countries were persuaded to rethink their national history and to present it in the Greek language to the educated readers of a multinational society." Some scholars have also argued that his history of Rome may have been primarily intended for an Hellenist audience.

Fabius' work, which is variously called the Annales Graeci or the Romaika (≈ Romaion) praxeis by ancient authors, comprised three large sections: one on the ktisis (creation story), which included the first years of the Republic; a second part on "the antiquities after the foundation phase", that is the period from the Decemvirate (ca. 450) to the Pyrrhic War (280–275); and a third on the contemporary history from the outbreak of the First Punic War onwards. Fabius' account of early Rome mixed historical elements with mythology. His story began with the "coming of Herakles into Italy" and the arrival of the legendary Trojan refugee Aeneas in Latium. He dated the founding of Rome to the "first year of the eighth Olympiad", that is 747 BC. According to historian Hans Beck, "the calculation of the city's foundation date that matched with Olympiad chronologies attests both to the call for accuracy and to the desire to stress an analogy to Greek culture." Fabius' work ended with his own recollections of the Second Punic War, although it is unclear whether he survived long enough to record it entirely.

Fabius' history has not survived, but it is partially known today through quotations and allusions by later authors. It is not certain whether the work was annalistic, recounting events year by year, although citation of his work by other historians may imply that it was. According to Beck, however, the label "annalistic" should be avoided to describe Fabius' work, for the surviving fragments "make it plain that the conceptual assumptions of this model (lack of style, a mere compilation of people, places and prodigies) are not accurate."

== Views and influences ==
Fabius was influenced by Greek historiographical methods, especially that of the Sicilian Greek historian Timaeus. Other Greek authors such as Antiochus of Syracuse and Diocles of Peparethus had already written about the mythical origins of Rome, and Fabius was also influenced by them. For instance, his narrative of the legendary overthrow of Amulius by Romulus and Remus was taken from Diocles.

His views of Roman history as a closed unity in search for social meaning were biased towards his nation, and probably emerged as a nationalistic reaction influenced by the conflict between Rome and Carthage, especially the political turmoil that followed the defeat of Cannae in 216 BC. Beck writes that "the work’s apologetic tone, its idealization of the republic as a well-ordered state, and the emphasis on Rome’s loyalty to its allies all seem to support this view, suiting an effort at damage-control immediately after Cannae." According to scholar John Briscoe, "his reasons for writing in Greek were both literary—the possibility of writing in Latin did not occur to him—and political, the need to defend Roman policy to the Greek world." However, Momigliano contends that the available Fabius's fragments recounting contemporary events appear "objective and serene ... [and show] that Fabius was in no hurry to present the Carthaginians to the Greek public as collectively responsible for the beginning of the Second Punic War."

== Legacy ==
Fabius' portrayal of the Siege of Saguntum as the cause of the Second Punic War, dismissing Hannibal's attack as sweeping "injustice", soon became the dominant view among ancient historians. In the early 2nd century BC, Roman historians Lucius Cincius Alimentus and Gaius Acilius were highly influenced by Fabius in matters of language, form, and theme.

The annals [Fabius] produced inaugurated a new type of national history, less antiquarian than the local chronicles of the Greek states, more concerned with the continuity of political institutions than most of the Greek general histories we know. The Romans could not remain bound to the notion of contemporary history because they had a profound sense of tradition and continuity. They might be uncritical about their own past, but they felt they had to narrate their own history ab urbe condita, from the beginnings. The annals from the origins of Rome were the most characteristic product of their historiography ... Roman traditionalism had inspired the Annals of the Pontiffs. Fabius Pictor kept it alive while accepting the methods, and to a great extent the contents, of Greek political history. Fabius invented national history for the Latin West. Thereby he created the form for the expression of national consciousness: possibly he contributed to the creation of national consciousness itself, such as we understand it.

Fabius was used as a source by Polybius, Livy, Gellius, Quadrigarius, Plutarch, and Dionysius of Halicarnassus. Despite his use of Fabius's history, Polybius complained about the quality of his work, saying that he had been biased towards the Romans and inconsistent. Cicero spoke harshly of early Roman historians: "Let me remind you that in the beginning the Greeks themselves also wrote like our Cato, Pictor, and Piso. History was nothing more than a compilation of yearly chronicles..."

An anonymous Account of the Roman History of Fabius Pictor was published in 1749, claiming that a manuscript in the "Carthaginian language" had been discovered in the ruins of Herculaneum near Pompeii. In fact, it was a political satire on English religion and politics at the time.

== Bibliography ==
- Badian, Ernst (1966). "The Early Historians". In Dorey, T.A. (ed.). Latin Historians. Routledge. pp. 1–38. OCLC 956360.
- Beck, Hans (2010). "The Early Roman Tradition". In Marincola, John (ed.). A Companion to Greek and Roman Historiography. John Wiley & Sons. ISBN 978-1-4443-9382-8.
- Beck, Hans (2012). "Fabius Pictor, Quintus". The Encyclopedia of Ancient History. Wiley-Blackwell. doi:10.1002/9781444338386.wbeah08065. ISBN 978-1-4443-3838-6.
- Briscoe, John (2016). "Fabius Pictor, Quintus". Oxford Research Encyclopedia of Classics. doi:10.1093/acrefore/9780199381135.013.2618. ISBN 978-0-19-938113-5.
- Dillery, John (2009). "Roman historians and the Greeks: Audiences and models". In Feldherr, Andrew (ed.). The Cambridge Companion to the Roman Historians. Cambridge University Press. pp. 77–107. ISBN 978-1-139-82769-0.
- Frier, Bruce W. (1999). Libri Annales Pontificum Maximorum: The Origins of the Annalistic Tradition. University of Michigan Press. ISBN 978-0-472-10915-9.
- Momigliano, Arnaldo (1990). "Fabius Pictor and the Origins of National History". In Momigliano, Arnaldo (ed.). The Classical Foundations of Modern Historiography. University of California Press. pp. 80–108. ISBN 978-0-520-07870-3.
