= Numerius Fabius Pictor (consul) =

Roman senator and general

Numerius Fabius Pictor (fl. 273–266 BC) was a Roman senator and military commander.

In 273 BC, he was among a group of ambassadors sent by the Senate to the court of Egyptian king Ptolemy II Philadelphus. In 266, Pictor became consul alongside Decimus Junius Pera. The two men campaigned in Umbria against Sassina and in Calabria against the Sallentini and Messapians, both times successfully. For each victory the consuls celebrated triumphs.

His brother was the consul Gaius Fabius Pictor.

He was probably uncle of Quintus Fabius Pictor, the first Roman historian.

| Preceded by Marcus Atilius Regulus; Lucius Julius Libo | Roman consul 266 BC; With: Decimus Junius Pera | Succeeded by Quintus Fabius Maximus Gurges; Lucius Mamilius Vitulus |
