= Lucius Lucretius Tricipitinus Flavus =

4th-century BC Roman statesman and general

Lucius Lucretius Tricipitinus Flavus was a Roman statesman and general who had a prominent career in the early 4th century BC, serving once as consul, and four times as consular tribune, as well as perhaps serving as Princeps senatus.

== Family and name ==
Lucretius was a member of the patrician family of the Lucretii Tricipitini, a house whose members were integral to the founding of the Roman Republic. Indeed, Lucretia, whose rape by Sextus Tarquinius sparked the overthrow of the Roman monarchy, was a member of this house and her father Spurius Lucretius Tricipitinus was one of the first consuls in 509 BC. From this early period, the Lucretii Tricipitini remained fairly significant, if slightly overshadowed by more prominent houses. As we do not have his filiation, the name of Lucretius' father is unknown, but he may have been Publius Lucretius Tricipitinus, who was consular tribune in 419 and 417 BC, however it is impossible for this to be truly determined. The additional name "Flavus" held by Lucretius is not attested to be held by any other members of the Lucretii, which likely means that this is a personal cognomen, probably given to him because he had blond hair.

== Consulship ==
In 393 BC, Lucretius was elected consul alongside Servius Sulpicius Camerinus. They were the second college of consuls elected for that year as another pair of consuls had been elected before them but were unable to take office for reasons unknown. This year was the first time in 16 years that consuls were elected; the patricians reinstated the office, which was reviled by plebeians by virtue of the fact that they could not stand for it, as revenge against them for continuing to push for a law which would redistribute the recently conquered Veientene territory amongst the plebeians. In his year of office, the Aequi attacked the Roman colony of Vitelia and in reaction the senate sent Lucretius to combat them, which he did with great success, winning a victory against the Aequians. Later that year, a vote was held on whether or not half of the Roman population should be allowed to settle in Veii, with the motion being defeated by the vote of only one tribe.

== Later career ==
In 391 BC, Lucretius was elected to the first of his four consular tribuneships, serving alongside Servius Sulpicius Camerinus, his former consular colleague, Lucius (or Marcus) Aemilius Mamercinus, Lucius Furius Medullinus, Agrippa Furius Fusus, and Gaius Aemilius Mamercinus, entering office on the first of July. In this year, war was conducted against the Etruscan city of Volsinii as well as the Salpinates, inhabitants of an otherwise unknown city in Etruria. Lucretius alongside Gaius Aemilius were charged with conducting the war against Volsinii, while Servius Sulpicius and Agrippa Furius were chosen to combat the Salpinates. Lucretius and Aemilius marched to confront the Volsinian army, facing them in a pitched battle in which the Roman cavalry surrounded the Volsinian ranks, forcing up to eight thousand men to surrender. After this defeat, Volsinii agreed to a twenty-year truce with Rome.

Lucretius is next mentioned in 389 BC in the events immediately after the Gallic sack of Rome the previous year. At this time, Rome had just been saved from the Gauls by the dictator Marcus Furius Camillus, however as a result of the city of Rome now being somewhat ruined, many plebeians restarted the effort to move most of the population to Veii, which was unaffected by the Gauls. Camillus ardently opposed this effort, arguing that it would be sacrilege to abandon the city for whom they had fought and died for. However, due to his propriety to the institutions of the state, Camillus took the matter to the senate to decide on. The first to speak on the matter was Lucretius who was regarded as the first man of the senate, who declared, after being interrupted by an auspicious omen, that the city of Rome should not be abandoned. After hearing what Lucretius had to say, the overwhelming majority of the senate voted to remain in Rome.

In 388 BC, Lucretius again served as consular tribune, with his colleagues being Titus Quinctius Cincinnatus Capitolinus, Quintus Servilius Fidenas, Lucius Julius Iulus, Lucius Aquillius Corvus, and Servius Sulpicius Rufus. In this year two campaigns were conducted, one against the Aequi and another against the Etruscans of Tarquinii, however it is unstated who led which army, so the role of Lucretius in these events is unknown.

In 383 BC, Lucretius served as consular tribune once more alongside Lucius Valerius Poplicola, Aulus Manlius Capitolinus, Servius Sulpicius Rufus, Lucius Aemilius Mamercinus, and Marcus Trebonius. In this year a new war broke out with the Latin city of Lanuvium, however no campaign was able to be carried out because of a pestilence in Rome.

In 381 BC, Lucretius served as consular tribune for a fourth and final time, this time alongside Marcus Furius Camillus, Aulus Postumius Regillensis, Lucius Postumius Regillensis, Lucius Furius Medullinus, and Marcus Fabius Ambustus. In this year there was a war continued from the previous year with the Volscians, with the senate specifically choosing Camillus to lead the campaign against them, with his nephew, Lucius Furius Medullinus being chosen as his deputy by random lot. This war was conducted with great success and a great battle was won, in which men from Tusculum were found amidst the enemy ranks, which Camillus reported to the senate. Having been caught aiding Rome's enemies and knowing that Rome would overpower them if they tried to resist, the city of Tusculum submitted itself to Rome. The actions of Lucretius in this year are unstated, meaning it is likely he remained in the city and conducted administrative duties.

This is the final mention of Lucretius in history, he had no recorded children, and after him there are no recorded members of the Lucretii Tricipitini family.

== Bibliography ==
- Livy (Titus Livius), Ab Urbe Condita Libri
- Plutarch, Parallel Lives, Life of Camillus
- Broughton, T. Robert S., The Magistrates of the Roman Republic, American Philological Association (1952)
