= Gaius Fabius Ambustus (consul) =

4th-century BC Roman politician

Gaius Fabius Ambustus was consul of the Roman Republic in 358 BC, in which year, according to Livy, a dictator was appointed through fear of the Gauls. He was appointed Interrex in 355 BC.

He was the son of Numerius Fabius Ambustus, consular tribune in 406 and 390 BC, and the brother of Marcus Fabius Ambustus, consul in 360, 356 and 354 BC.

== See also ==
- Ambustus, for a list of other men with the same cognomen
- Fabius Ambustus, for a list of other men used the same combination of gens name and cognomen
- Fabia gens

Political offices
Preceded by Marcus Popillius Laenas and Gnaeus Manlius Capitolinus Imperiosus	Consul of the Roman Republic; 358 BC with Gaius Plautius Proculus	Succeeded by Gaius Marcius Rutilus and Gnaeus Manlius Capitolinus Imperiosus II
