= Hans Beck (historian) =

German historian of classical antiquity (born 1969)

- Born: 22 April 1969 (age 57)

Academic background
- Education: University of Erlangen–Nuremberg; University of Kent at Canterbury; St Edmund's College, Cambridge
- Thesis: Polis und Koinon: Untersuchungen zur Geschichte und Struktur der griechischen Bundesstaaten im 4. Jahrhundert v. Chr

Academic work
- Discipline: Classical studies
- Institutions: University of Cologne; Center for Hellenic Studies; Goethe University Frankfurt; McGill University; University of Münster
- Website: www.hansbeck.org

Hans Beck (born 22 April 1969 in Werneck) is a German and Canadian scholar in the field of Classical Studies.

== Career ==
Hans Beck received his PhD in Ancient History from University of Erlangen–Nuremberg in 1996 with a thesis on Polis und Koinon. Untersuchungen zur Geschichte und Struktur der griechischen Bundesstaaten im 4. Jahrhundert v. Chr. (Polis and Koinon: Investigations in the History and Structure of Greek Federal States in the 4th Century BC). In 1997 he was hired to the position of assistant professor at Cologne University. In 2001–2002 he was a Junior Research Fellow in residence at the Center for Hellenic Studies in Washington DC. He achieved his Habilitation in Cologne in 2003 with a work entitled Karriere und Hierarchie. Die römische Aristokratie und die Anfänge des cursus honorum in der mittleren Republik (Career and Hierarchy: The Roman Aristocracy and the Origins of the cursus honorum in the Middle Republic) and then moved on to Frankfurt University in 2004, where he held a Heisenberg Fellowship, awarded by the Deutsche Forschungsgemeinschaft. In 2005 he was hired to the position of Professor of Ancient Greek History and John MacNaughon Chair of Classics at McGill University, where he also served as Director of Classical Studies (2007 to 2016). In 2018 he accepted the offer to take up the professorship and chair in Greek History at University of Münster, which is his current employment. He remains affiliated with McGill University as adjunct professor in the Department of History and Classical Studies.

Beck specializes in the history and culture of the ancient Greek world, with a thematic focus on localism and the local, polis governance, and federalism. His research also extends to the study of the political culture of ancient Rome, the exercise of aristocratic rule in antiquity, and ancient historiography. He contributed many entries to Brill's New Pauly and Brill's New Jacoby, for which he has also served on the editorial board. He is co-editor of Teiresias Journal Online and Teiresias Supplements Online, Hermes, Zeitschrift für Klassische Philologie, and the Cambridge University Press series Antiquity in Global Context. In 2015, he was awarded the Anneliese Maier Research Prize of the Humboldt Foundation. He was elected into the Royal Society of Canada in 2018 and appointed a Corresponding Member of the German Archaeological Institute in 2020.

== Selected publications ==
- Polis und Koinon. Untersuchungen zur Geschichte und Struktur der griechischen Bundesstaaten im 4. Jhdt. v. Chr., Steiner, Stuttgart 1997 ISBN 3-515-07117-2 (Historia Einzelschriften, Vol. 114).
- Editor with Uwe Walter: Die Frühen Römischen Historiker I. Von Fabius Pictor bis Cn. Gellius, Wissenschaftliche Buchgesellschaft, Darmstadt 2001, ISBN 3-534-14757-X (Texte zur Forschung, Vol. 76).
  - E-book edition 2003, 2. überarbeitete Auflage 2005 (ISBN 3-534-19048-3).
- Editor with Uwe Walter: Die Frühen Römischen Historiker II. Von Coelius Antipater bis Pomponius Atticus, Wissenschaftliche Buchgesellschaft, Darmstadt 2004, ISBN 3-534-14758-8 (Texte zur Forschung, Band 77).
- Karriere und Hierarchie. Die römische Aristokratie und die Anfänge des cursus honorum in der mittleren Republik, Akademie, Berlin 2005, ISBN 3-05-004154-4 (Klio supplement, New Series, Vol. 10).
- Editor with Peter Scholz and Uwe Walter: Die Macht der Wenigen. Aristokratische Herrschaftspraxis, Kommunikation und edler Lebensstil in Antike und Früher Neuzeit, Oldenbourg, München 2008 ISBN 978-3-486-58726-5 (Historische Zeitschrift, Beiheft, Neue Folge, Band 47).
- Editor with John Buckler: Central Greece and the Politics of Power in the Fourth Century BC., Cambridge University Press, Cambridge 2008.
- Editor with Hans-Ulrich Wiemer: Feiern und Erinnern. Geschichtsbilder im Spiegel antiker Feste, Verlag Antike, Berlin 2009 (Studien zur Alten Geschichte).
- Editor with Antonio Duplá, Francisco Pina Polo and Martin Jehne: Consuls and Res Publica. Holding High Office in Republican Rome, Cambridge University Press, Cambridge 2011.
- A Companion to Ancient Greek Government, Wiley-Blackwell, 2013.
- Editor with Peter Funke: Federalism in Greek Antiquity, Cambridge University Press, Cambridge 2015.
- Editor with Martin Jehne and John Serrati: Money and Power in the Roman Republic, Éditions Latomus, Bruxelles 2016 (Collection Latomus Vol. 355).
- Editor with Benedikt Eckhardt, Christoph Michels and Sonja Richter: Von Magna Graecia nach Asia Minor. Festschrift für Linda-Marie Günther zum 65. Geburtstag, Harrassowitz Verlag, Wiesbaden 2017 (Philippika Vol. 116).
- Editor with Philip J. Smith: Megarian Moments. The Local World of an Ancient Greek City-State, McGill University Library and Archives, Montreal 2018 (Teiresias Supplements Online Vol. 1).
- Editor with Karl-Joachim Hölkeskamp: Verlierer und Aussteiger in der 'Konkurrenz unter Anwesenden'. Agnalität in der politischen Kultur des antiken Rom, Franz Steiner Verlag, Stuttgart 2019.
- Editor with Kostas Buraselis and Alex McAuley: Ethnos and Koinon. Studies in Ancient Greek Ethnicity and Federalism, Franz Steiner Verlag, Stuttgart 2019 (Heidelberger althistorische Beiträge und epigraphische Studien Vol. 61) ISBN 978-3-515-12217-7.
- Localism and the Ancient Greek City-State. The University of Chicago Press, Chicago 2020.
- Editor with Griet Vankeerberghen: Rulers and Ruled in Ancient Greece, Rome, and China, Cambridge University Press, Cambridge 2021.
- Editor with Julián Gallego, Carlos Gracía Mac Gaw and Francisco Pina Polo: Encuentro con las élites del Mediterráneo antiguo. Liderazgo, estilos de vida, letigimidad, Miño y Davila Editores, Ciudad Autónoma de Buenos Aires 2021 (PEFSCEA Vol. 21).
