= Gaius Fabius Pictor (consul) =

Gaius Fabius Pictor was a Roman politician in the third century BC.

== Family ==
He was a member of gens Fabia. His father, after the end of the Second Samnite War, had made a vow to the Temple of Quirinius, and in 304 BC ordered it to be decorated with painted images, thus his cognomen Pictor. Gaius Fabius Pictor's brother was the consul Numerius Fabius Pictor in 266 BC.

== Career ==
Gaius himself served as consul in 269 BC with Quintus Ogulnius Gallus as his colleague. In that year, he waged war against the tribes of the Samnites and the Messapians. In addition, silver coins were first minted in Italy.
