= Temple of Salus =

Sanctuary temple in Ancient Rome

The Temple of Salus was an temple in ancient Rome dedicated to the goddess Salus ("safety, deliverance"). It was located near the Porta Salutaris on the site of the current palazzo del Quirinale and was vowed by in 311 by the consul Gaius Junius Bubulcus Brutus, who also let the contracts when censor in 306-303 BC, and finally dedicated it as dictator in 303.

The temple celebrated the victory of the consul in the Second Samnite War (326-304 BC) and was decorated by Gaius Fabius Pictor with scenes of the war and the triumph.

The temple burned during the reign of Claudius but was restored and was still standing in the 4th century, though no remaining traces of the temple are known to exist today.

== See also ==
- List of Ancient Roman temples
