= Gaius Fabius Ambustus (magister equitum 315 BC) =

Ancient Roman general and politician

Gaius Fabius Ambustus was a general and politician of ancient Rome. He was the son apparently of Marcus Fabius Ambustus, and brother to Quintus Fabius Maximus Rullianus and to the Marcus Fabius Ambustus who was magister equitum in 322 BC. He himself was appointed Master of the Horse in 315 BC in place of Quintus Aulius Cerretanus, who had fallen in battle while serving as Master of the Horse to Gaius's brother Marcus.

== See also ==
- Fabia gens
- Ambustus (disambiguation)
