= Decimus Junius Pera =

Roman consul 266 BC

Decimus Junius Pera was a Roman politician in the third century BC.

== Family ==
He was a member of gens Junia. His son was Marcus Junius Pera, consul in 230 BC.

== Career ==
Junius Pera held the consulship together with Numerius Fabius Pictor in 266 BC. In that year the consuls twice celebrated triumphs, first over Sassina, then over the Sallentines and the Messapii.

In 253, Junius Pera served as censor.
