= Quintus Fabius Maximus Gurges (consul 265 BC) =

Roman statesman and general

Quintus Fabius Maximus Gurges was Roman consul in 265 BC, and died of wounds received in battle at Volsinii, where he had been sent to help put down a revolt. There is some uncertainty as to his identity.

== Controversy ==
Traditionally the consul of 265 has been identified as the same Quintus Fabius Maximus Gurges who had previously been consul in 292 and 276 BC. This Gurges was the son of Quintus Fabius Maximus Rullianus, and is usually regarded as the father of Quintus Fabius Maximus Verrucosus. Livy describes Verrucosus as the grandson of Rullianus, and thus the son of Gurges, but passages in Plutarch and Pliny referring to Verrucosus as the great-grandson of Rullianus imply the existence of an intervening generation. Although Verrucosus is said to have served as an augur for sixty-two years at the time of his death in 203 BC, and thus would have been at least a young man in 265, the interval between his first consulship, in 233 BC, and that of Gurges, in 292, supports the hypothesis that he was Gurges' grandson, rather than his son.

If Verrucosus was the grandson of the consul of 292 and 276 BC, then one hypothesis holds that the Quintus Fabius Maximus Gurges who was consul in 265 was the son of the Gurges who had been consul in 292 and 276; he would also be the father of Verrucosus, and make the latter the great-grandson of Rullianus, as described by Plutarch and Pliny. This view was suggested by Karl Julius Beloch and Attilio Degrassi. An alternative hypothesis, however, holds that there was only one Gurges, who was consul in 292, 276, and 265, and that Verrucosus was the son of another Fabius Maximus, perhaps the Quintus Fabius who, as curule aedile in 266 BC, insulted the envoys of Apollonia in Epirus, and was given over to the people of Apollonia for punishment, only to be returned by them unharmed. This Fabius would have been the son of Gurges, and had his public career cut short by his own indiscretion. This view was suggested by the Dictionary of Greek and Roman Biography and Mythology, and later followed by Münzer.

== See also ==
- Fabia gens

== Bibliography ==
- Titus Livius (Livy), History of Rome.
- Gaius Plinius Secundus (Pliny the Elder), Naturalis Historia (Natural History).
- Plutarchus, Lives of the Noble Greeks and Romans.
- Dictionary of Greek and Roman Biography and Mythology, William Smith, ed., Little, Brown and Company, Boston (1849).
- August Pauly, Georg Wissowa, et alii, Realencyclopädie der Classischen Altertumswissenschaft, J. B. Metzler, Stuttgart (1894–1980).
- Karl Julius Beloch, Römische Geschichte bis zum Beginn der punischen Kriege (Roman History to the Beginning of the Punic Wars), De Gruyter, Berlin (1926).
- T. Robert S. Broughton, The Magistrates of the Roman Republic, American Philological Association (1952).

Political offices
Preceded by Decimus Junius Pera; Numerius Fabius Pictor	Roman consul 265 BC with Lucius Mamilius Vitulus	Succeeded by Appius Claudius Caudex; Marcus Fulvius Flaccus
