= Numerius Fabius Pictor (antiquarian) =

Roman antiquarian

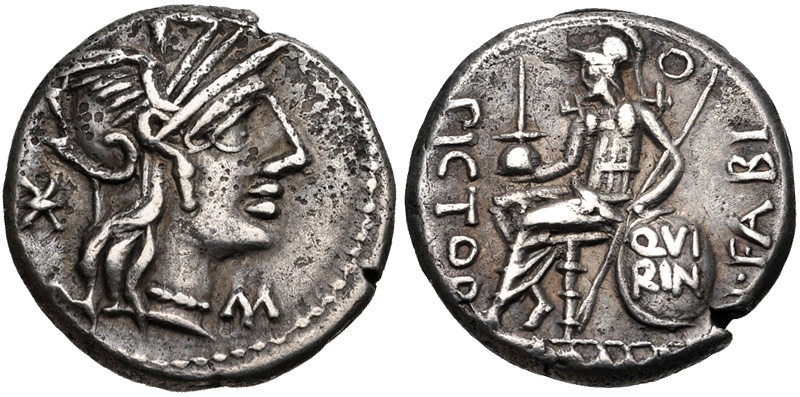
Denarius minted in 126 BC by one Numerius Fabius Pictor, probably a son of the antiquarian

Numerius Fabius Pictor (fl. c. 160–150 BC) was a Roman antiquarian. To him are usually attributed a history of Rome written in Latin, as well as a commentary on Roman pontifical law, neither of which have survived. Cicero described him as an expert in law, literature, and history, as well as a notable orator in his own right.

Numerius, born around 188 BC, was probably a grandson of Quintus Fabius Pictor, the first Roman historian. Münzer and Frier both hold that he held the pontificate during the 150s BC, and his literary activity will presumably date from then onward. The precise nature of his now-lost Latin history has long been controversial: some modern authors argue that it was simply a revision of the Greek history of his ancestor Quintus Pictor, while others contend that it was an independent historical work in its own right.

He seems to have had a son, also called Numerius Fabius Pictor, a mint officer who issued coins in 126 BC.
