= Marcus Fabius Ambustus (consular tribune 381 BC) =

4th-century BC Roman consular tribune and censor

Marcus Fabius Ambustus was a consular tribune of the Roman Republic in 381 BC, and a censor in 363. He was the son of Caeso Fabius Ambustus.

The Fabii were patricians. Fabius Ambustus had two daughters, both named Fabia; the elder (Fabia Major) married the patrician Servius Sulpicius Praetextatus, while the younger (Fabia Minor) married the plebeian Gaius Licinius Stolo. According to Livy, Fabia Minor endured mockery for her marriage to a person of lower social class, and as a result persuaded her father to support legislation that would open the consulship to plebeians. As consular tribune a second time in 369, Ambustus took an active part in passing the Lex Licinia Sextia, legislation authored in part by Gaius Licinius Stolo in his role as tribune of the plebs.

== See also ==
- Ambustus, for other men with the same cognomen
- Fabius Ambustus, for other men who used the same combination of gens name and cognomen
