= Numerius Fabius Ambustus =

Roman politician and soldier, 5th–4th century BC

Numerius (or Gnaeus) Fabius Ambustus (fl. c. 406–390 BC) was an ancient Roman commander who was the son of Marcus Fabius Ambustus, and brother to Caeso and Quintus. In 406 BC, he and his forces captured the Volscian city of Anxur (modern Terracina) by securing the high ground above the town, from which they were able to launch attacks against its walls. When the town's defenders attempted to respond to these harassing attacks, the remainder of Numerius' forces used escalade to scale the walls and enter the town. After the victory, his forces began to torture the inhabitants of the city in retaliation for the Volscian massacre of the Roman garrison at Verrugo, thought to be located in the Trerus valley, (modern Sacco river valley) of the Lazio region, and where the Roman prisoners had been horribly tortured. Numerius eventually showed mercy, and around 2500 Volscians were permitted to surrender with their lives.

Fabius was consular tribune in 406 BC, and again in 390. It was in his second consulship that he and his two brothers were sent as ambassador to the Gauls who were besieging Clusium. During this mission he participated in an attack against the besieging Gauls. The Gauls demanded that the three should be surrendered to them for violating the law of nations. When the Roman Senate refused to give up the guilty parties, the Gauls marched against Rome, which they sacked after the battle of the Allia.

Many scholars believe the entire story of the events at Clusium to be fiction, as Clusium had no real reason to appeal to Rome for help, and the Gauls needed no real provocation to sack Rome. The story, it is hypothesized, exists to provide an explanation for an otherwise unmotivated attack on Rome, and to depict Rome as a bulwark of Italy against the Gauls.

His son was Marcus Fabius Ambustus (consul 360 BC) and possibly Gaius Fabius Ambustus (consul 358 BC).

Political offices
Preceded by Lucius Furius, Gaius Valerius II, Gnaeus Fabius Vibulanus II, and Gaius Servilius Ahala II	Roman consular tribune 406 BC with Publius Cornelius Rutilus Cossus, Gnaeus Cornelius Cossus, and Lucius Valerius Potitus II	Succeeded by Titus Quinctius, Aulus Manlius, Quintus Quinctius Cincinnatus II, Lucius Furius Medullinus II, Gaius Julius II, and Manius Aemilius
Preceded by Lucius Lucretius, Lucius Furius VII; Servius Sulpicius Camerinus, Agrippa Furius Fusus, Lucius Aemilius Mamercinus, and Gaius Aemilius Mamercinus II	Roman consular tribune 390 BC with Quintus Sulpicius Longus, Caeso Fabius Ambustus IV, Quintus Servilius Fidenas IV, Quintus Fabius Ambustus, and Publius Cornelius Maluginensis IV	Succeeded by Lucius Valerius II, Aulus Manlius, Lucius Verginius, Lucius Aemilius II, Publius Cornelius, and Lucius Postumius
