= Lex Ogulnia =

Ancient Roman law

The lex Ogulnia was a Roman law passed in 300 BC. It was a milestone in the long struggle between the patricians and plebeians. The law was carried by the brothers Quintus and Gnaeus Ogulnius, tribunes of the plebs in 300 BC. For the first time, it opened the various priesthoods to the plebeians. It also increased the number of pontifices from five to nine (including the pontifex maximus), and led to the appointment of Tiberius Coruncanius, the first plebeian pontifex maximus, in 254 BC. The law further required that five of the augurs be plebeians.

== See also ==
- Other laws concerning the status of plebeians:
  - Lex Canuleia, 445 BC
  - Leges Liciniae Sextiae, 367 BC
  - Lex Hortensia, 287 BC
- Roman Law
- List of Roman laws
