= Marcus Fabius Ambustus (magister equitum 322 BC) =

Magister equitum in 322 B.C

Marcus Fabius Ambustus was Magister Equitum of the Roman Republic in 322 BC. The identification of him as the son of the consul M. Fabius Ambustus depends on a reference in Livy to the active military service of a cavalry officer serving under the dictator Aulus Cornelius Cossus Arvina, but T.R.S. Broughton finds it more likely that the three-time consul was himself the Magister Equitum carrying out administrative duties. Similarly, it is unclear if it was this M. Fabius who was the interrex appointed in 340 BC or if this should be attributed to his father the consul M. Fabius Ambustus or another consul of the Fabii, M. Fabius Dursuo.

== See also ==
- Ambustus, for other men with the same cognomen
- Fabius Ambustus, for other men who used the same combination of gens name and cognomen
- Fabia gens, for a comprehensive list of gens members
