= Quintus Fabius Ambustus (dictator) =

Ancient Roman dictator

Quintus Fabius Ambustus was made dictator of the Roman Republic in 321 BC. He immediately resigned because of some kind of irregularity in his election, whereupon he was replaced by Marcus Aemilius Papus, who was also unable to hold elections, leading to the appointment of Quintus Fabius Maximus Rullianus and Marcus Valerius Corvus as interreges, who successfully oversaw the elections of the consuls for 320 BC.

== See also ==
- Fabia gens
