= Legitimate use of force =

Legitimate use of force may refer to:

- the right of a state to exercise legitimate authority or violence over a given territory; see monopoly on the legitimate use of physical force
- the right of civilians acting on their own behalf to engage in violence for the sake of self-defense; see right of self-defense
- historical right of conquest
