= Battle of the Allia =

Battle between Gauls and Roman Republic, c. 387 BC

- Part of the Roman–Gallic wars
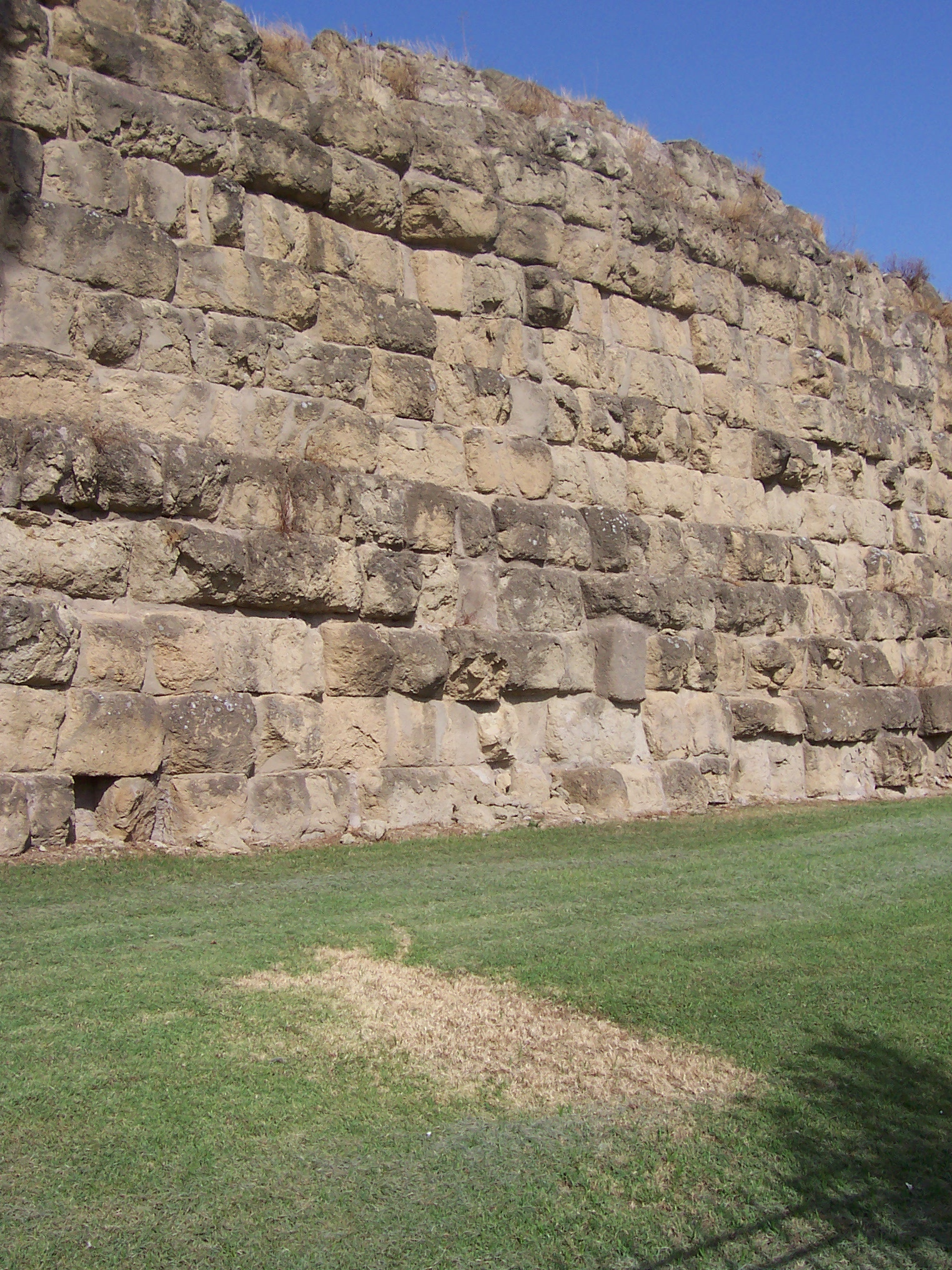
- The Servian Wall; According to Titus Livius 6.32 the censors ordered its rebuilding after the sack.
Date	387 BC (probable), 390 BC (traditional)
Location	Allia river, near Rome 42°01′03″N 12°31′12″E
Result	Gallic victory: Sack of Rome (390 BC)

Belligerents
Roman Republic	Gauls • Senones • Boii • Insubres

Commanders and leaders
Quintus Sulpicius Longus	Brennus

Strength
c. 15,000	c. 20,000
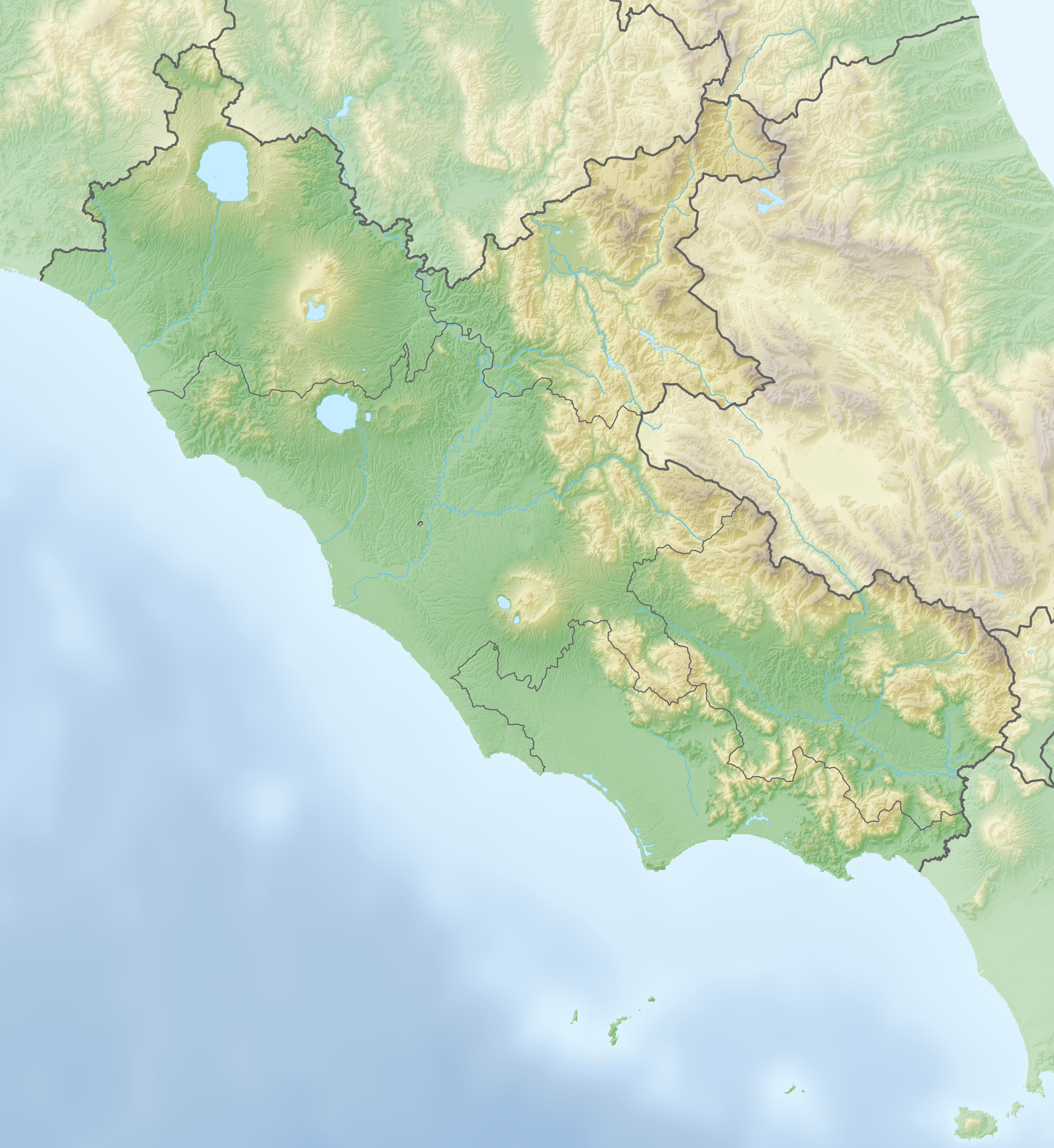
- Location within Italy Battle of the Allia (Lazio) Battle of the Allia (Mediterranean)

The Battle of the Allia was fought c. 387 BC between the Senones – a Gallic tribe led by Brennus, who had invaded Northern Italy – and the Roman Republic.

The battle was fought at the confluence of the Tiber river and Allia brook, 11 Roman miles (16 km, 10 mi) north of Rome. The Romans were routed and subsequently Rome was sacked by the Senones.

The dies Alliensis ('Day of the Allia') was regarded as an ill-omened day in the Roman calendar, and treated as a dies religiosus on which public and ritual activity was avoided. Although later authors such as Livy present it as a lasting civic taboo, the tradition is only attested from the 1st century BC and likely reflects later reconstruction rather than continuous observance from the 4th to the 1st century AD.

== Background ==
The Senones were one of the various Gallic tribes that had recently invaded northern Italy. They settled on the Adriatic Coast around what is now Rimini. According to Livy, they were called to the Etruscan town of Clusium (now Chiusi, Tuscany) by Aruns, an influential young man of the city who wanted to take revenge against Lucumo, whose son had "debauched his wife". When the Senones appeared, the Clusians felt threatened and asked Rome for help. The Romans sent the three sons of Marcus Fabius Ambustus, one of Rome's most powerful aristocrats, as ambassadors. They told the Gauls not to attack Clusium and that if they did, the Romans would fight to defend the town. They then asked to negotiate peace. The Senones accepted peace if the Clusians would give them some land. There was a quarrel and a battle broke out. The Roman ambassadors joined in, and one of them killed a Senone chieftain—violating the rule that ambassadors had to remain neutral. The brothers had taken sides and one of them had also killed a Senone. The Gauls withdrew to discuss what action to take.

According to Dionysius of Halicarnassus, Lucumo was the king of the city. He assigned the guardianship of his son to Aruns before he died. When the son became a young man, he fell in love with the wife of Aruns and seduced her. The grieving Aruns went to Gaul to sell wine, olives, and figs. The Gauls had never seen such products and asked Aruns where they were produced. He replied that they came from a large and fertile land, inhabited by only a few people who were not good fighters. He advised them to drive the people out of their land and enjoy the fruit as their own. He persuaded them to come to Italy, go to Clusium, and make war. Dionysius' account presumes that those Gauls had not invaded Italy and were in Gaul. When Quintus Fabius, one of the Roman ambassadors, killed a Gallic leader, they wanted the brothers to be handed over to them to pay the penalty for the men they had killed.

When the ambassadors of the Senones arrived in Rome and demanded the three Fabii brothers be handed over to them, the Senate was pressured by favouritism not to express opinions against the powerful Fabia family. To avoid being blamed for a possible defeat if the Gauls attacked, they referred the matter to the people. Livy wrote that "those whose punishment they were asked to decide were elected military tribunes with consular powers [heads of state] for the coming year." The Gauls were enraged that those who had violated the law of nations had been honoured and marched on Rome, 130 km (81 mi) from Clusium. Livy wrote that "in response to the tumult caused by their swift advance, terrified cities rushed to arms and the country folk fled, but the Gauls signified by their shouts wherever they went that their destination was Rome."

== Chronology and estimates of forces ==
=== Date of the battle ===
The date of the battle has been traditionally given as 390 BC in the Varronian chronology, based on an account of the battle by the Roman historian Livy. Plutarch noted that the battle took place "just after the summer solstice when the moon was near the full [...] a little more than three hundred and sixty years from the founding [of Rome]", or shortly after 393 BC. The Greek historian Polybius used a Greek dating system to derive the battle as having taken place in 387 BC. Modern historians consider c. 387 BC to be the most probable date.

Tacitus listed the date as 18 July. Others ancient sources write that 16 July was also considered ill-omened because of the disaster. Modern scholars have noted that 18 July coincides with the date given for the Battle of the Cremera (477 BC), suggesting that early roman historians such as Fabius Pictor (born c. 270 BC) may have aligned the Battle of the Allia with the earlier sacrifice of the Fabii. Plutarch uniquely dates the battle to the full moon following the summer solstice, which suggests the events actually occurred around 15 July in the archaic lunar-solar calendar.

=== Troop numbers ===
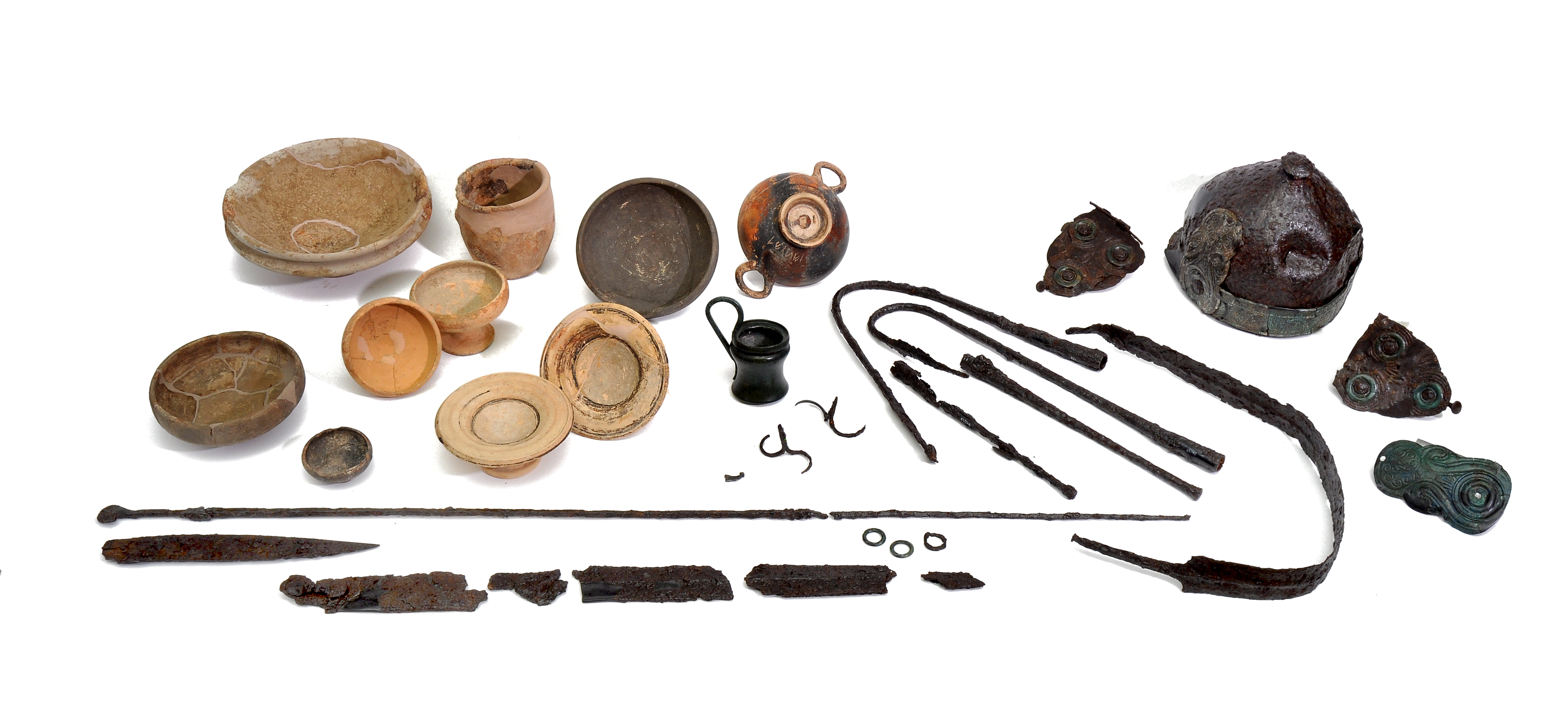
Boii warrior tomb from Monte Bibele T.14 with 4th century BC assemblage

None of the ancient sources produce reliable estimates for the number of men at the battle. They record forces for each side ranging from 24,000 to 40,000. (Note: Plutarch writes that the Romans were not outnumbered and had 40,000 men but that most were untrained and unaccustomed to weapons. Dionysius of Halicarnassus writes that the Romans had four well-trained legions and a levy of untrained citizens that was larger in number. That would give a rough figure of some 35,000. Diodorus Siculus writes that the Romans had 24,000 men. Livy gives no figures.) Modern estimates, however, are usually lower. Jeremy Armstrong suggests that both sides had around 5,000 men, which would be realistic for a Gallic mercenary band and the small size of Rome during this period. Other modern historians, such as Max Cary and H. H. Scullard, instead placed the Romans with some 15,000 men against a huge Gallic army of between thirty and seventy thousand. Peter Berresford Ellis gives an estimate of a minimum of 24,000 based on the assumption that "the Romans had ... four legions – for each consul had two legions under his command – and given that each legion had 6,000 men". He also thinks that there may have been a contingent of allied troops, and that the Senones tribal army could "scarcely number more than 12,000".

== Battle ==
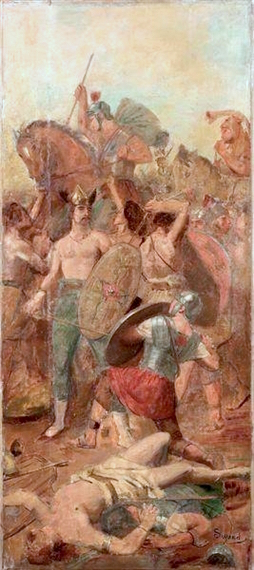
Battle of the Allia by G. Surand

There are only two ancient accounts that provide details of the battle. One is by Livy, and the other by Diodorus Siculus.

According to Livy, no special measures were taken in Rome, and the levy "was not larger than had been usual in ordinary campaigns". The Gauls marched on Rome so quickly that "Rome was thunderstruck by the swiftness at which they moved, which is shown both by the haste in mustering the army as if it were meeting a spur-of-the-moment emergency and the difficulty in getting any further than the eleventh milestone." At the eastern juncture of the Tiber River and Allia brook, the parties met; the Romans presumably were outnumbered. They did not set up camp or build a defensive rampart and they did not divine the gods, as they were supposed to. They extended the wings to avoid being outflanked, but that made their line so thin and weakened that the centre could hardly be kept together. They placed the reserves on a hill on the right. Brennus, the Senone chieftain, suspected that to be a ruse and that the reservists would attack him from the rear while he was fighting the Roman army on the plain. He, therefore, attacked the hill.

The Romans panicked. The left-wing threw their arms down and fled to the bank of the River Tiber. The Gauls killed the soldiers who were blocking one another's paths in the disorderly flight. Those who could not swim or were weak were weighed down by their armour and drowned. Still, the majority of the men reached Veii, an Etruscan city that had recently been conquered by Rome and was near the other bank. They did not even send a messenger to warn Rome. The right-wing, further from the river and closer to the hill, fled to Rome. The Gauls were surprised at how easy their victory had been.

The ancient Greek historian Diodorus Siculus said the Romans marched and crossed the River Tiber. He is the only ancient historian who placed the battle on the right bank of the river. The Romans lined up their best troops, 24,000 men, on the plain and placed the weakest troops on the hill. The Celts also lined up, placed their best men on the hill, and easily won the clash. The bulk of the Roman soldiers on the plain fled to the river in a disorderly manner and impeded each other. The Celts killed the men in the rear. Some Romans tried to cross the river wearing their armour, which, according to Diodorus, they prized more than their lives, but that weighed them down. Some drowned and some managed to reach the bank further downstream with great effort. As the Gauls kept killing the Romans, the soldiers then threw their arms away and swam across the river. The Gauls threw javelins at them. Most of the survivors fled to the city of Veii. Some returned to Rome and reported that the army had been destroyed.

Plutarch wrote that the Gauls encamped near the confluence of the Allia with the Tiber, some 18 km (11 mi) from Rome, and attacked the Romans suddenly. There was a "disorderly and shameful battle". The Roman left wing was pushed into the river and destroyed while the right-wing withdrew before the Gauls' attack from the plain to the hills and most of them fled to Rome. The rest of the survivors escaped to Veii at night. "They thought that Rome was lost and all her people slain."

== Sack of Rome ==
=== Account of Livy ===
Livy provides a detailed account of the sack of Rome. The Gauls were dumbfounded by their sudden and extraordinary victory and did not move from the place of the battle, as if they were puzzled. They feared a surprise and despoiled the dead, as was customary for them. When they did not see any hostile action, they set off and reached Rome before sunset. They saw that the city gates were open and that the walls were unmanned. That was another surprise. They decided to avoid a night battle in an unknown town and encamped between Rome and the River Anio. The inhabitants of Rome were in panic and did not know that most of their soldiers had fled to Veii, instead of Rome, and thought that the only survivors were those who fled back to Rome and that they had only a tiny force. Realising that they were defenceless, they decided to send the men of military age, the able-bodied senators and their families to the Capitoline Hill with weapons and provisions to defend the fortress. The Flamen of Quirinus and the Vestal Virgins, who were priests, were to take "the sacred things of the State" away and continue to perform their sacred cults. The situation was so dire that the elderly were left behind in the city and former consuls stayed with them to reconcile them with their fate. However, many of them followed their sons to the Capitoline. No one had the heart to stop them. Many people fled to the Janiculum Hill just outside the city and then dispersed to the countryside and other towns. The Flamen of Quirinus and the Vestal Virgins could take only some of the sacred objects and decided to bury the rest under the chapel next to the Flamen's house. They set off to the Janiculum with what they could carry. Lucius Albinus, who was leaving the city on a wagon, saw them walking. He ordered his wife and children to get off and gave them and the sacred vessels of Rome a lift to Caere, an Etruscan city on the coast that was an ally of Rome.

Those who had been officers of state decided to meet their fate wearing their ceremonial dresses and "the insignia of their former rank and honour and distinctions". They sat on their ivory chairs in front of their houses. The next day, the Senones entered the city. They passed through the open Colline Gate and went to the Roman Forum. They left a small body to guard there against any attack from the Capitoline and went through the streets for plunder. They did not meet anybody. People moved to other houses. The Gauls returned to the area of the Forum. Livy memorably described Gauls' encounter with the elderly patricians:

The houses of the plebeians were barricaded, the halls of the patricians stood open, but they felt greater hesitation about entering the open houses than those which were closed. They gazed with feelings of real veneration upon the men who were seated in the porticoes of their mansions, not only because of the superhuman magnificence of their apparel and their whole bearing and demeanour but also because of the majestic expression of their countenances, wearing the very aspect of gods. So they stood, gazing at them as if they were statues, till, as it is asserted, one of the patricians, M. Papirius, roused the passion of a Gaul, who began to stroke his beard – which in those days was universally worn long – by smiting him on the head with his ivory staff. He was the first to be killed, the others were butchered in their chairs. After this slaughter of the magnates, no living being was thenceforth spared; the houses were rifled, and then set on fire.

Despite the above statement, Livy wrote that the fires were not as widespread as one could expect on the first day of the capture of a city and speculated that the Gauls wanted not to destroy the city but only to intimidate the men on the Capitoline Hill into surrender to save their homes. Despite the anguish at hearing "the shouts of the enemy, the shrieks of the women and boys, the roar of the flames, and the crash of houses falling in", the men were resolved to continue to defend the hill. As that continued day after day, "they became as it was hardened to misery". After a few days, seeing that even though nothing survived "amidst the ashes and ruin" of the city, there was no sign of surrender, the Senones attacked Capitoline Hill at dawn. The defenders let the enemy climb up the steep hill and flung them down the slope. The Gauls stopped halfway up the hill. The Romans charged and inflicted such high casualties that the enemy never tried to take the hill again.

Instead, they prepared a siege. They divided their forces into two. One division besieged the hill, and the other went foraging in the territories of the neighbouring cities because all the grain around Rome had been taken to Veii by the Roman soldiers who had fled there. Some Gauls arrived at Ardea, where Marcus Furius Camillus, a great Roman military commander who had seized Veii a few years earlier, had gone when he was exiled because of accusations of embezzlement. Camillus rallied the people of Ardea to fight. He marched at night, caught the camp of the Gauls by surprise, and massacred the enemy in their sleep. Some Gallic fugitives got near Antium and were surrounded by its townsmen.

Meanwhile, in Rome, both sides were quiet. The Senones conducted the siege "with great slackness" and concentrated on preventing the Romans from slipping through their lines. The patrician clan of the Fabii held an annual sacrifice on the Quirinal Hill. Gaius Fabius Dorsuo came down the Capitoline carrying the sacred vessels, passed through the enemy pickets and went to the Quirinal. He duly performed the sacred rites and returned the Capitoline. Livy commented, "Either the Gauls were stupefied at his extraordinary boldness, or else they were restrained by religious feelings, for as a nation they are by no means inattentive to the claims of religion".

In the meantime, the survivors of the battle who had fled to Veii began to regroup. Led by Quintus Caedicius, the centurion they chose as their leader, they routed a force of Etruscans who looted the territory of Veii and intended to attack this city. They made some prisoners lead them to another Etruscan force, which was at the salt works, and inflicted even greater losses on that force. Caedicius' forces grew, and some Romans who had fled the city went to Veii. Volunteers from Latium also joined them. Caedicius decided to summon Camillus to take the command, but that required approval of the Senate. They sent Cominius Pontius, a soldier, to Rome as a messenger. He went down the River Tiber on a cork float and reached Rome. He reached the Capitoline by scaling "a precipitous rock which, owing to its steepness, the enemy had left unguarded". The Senate decreed that the popular assembly was to pass a law that annulled the banishment of Camillus and appointed him dictator (commander-in-chief). Camillus was escorted from Ardea to Veii.

The Senones either found footprints left by Cominius Pontius or discovered a relatively-easy ascent up the cliff. They climbed it and reached the summit of the Capitoline at night. They were heard not by the guards and the dogs but by the geese sacred to the goddess Juno, which woke up the Romans. Marcus Manlius Capitolinus, a former consul, knocked down a Gaul who had reached the top. He fell on those behind him. Manlius also killed some Gauls who had laid aside their weapons to cling to the rocks. He was joined by the other soldiers and the enemy was repulsed. Manlius was commended for his bravery. Quintus Sulpicius wanted to court-martial the guards who had failed to notice the enemy, but the soldiers prevented him from doing so. It was agreed to blame one man, who was thrown down the cliff.

Famine began to afflict both armies. The Gauls were also affected by pestilence. They were on low ground between the hills, which had been scorched by the fires and there was malaria. Many of them died because of disease and the heat. They started to pile the dead bodies and burn them, instead of burying them. They started negotiations with the Romans and called on them to surrender because of the famine. They also hinted that they could be bought off. The Roman leaders, who were waiting for Camillus to arrive with an army from Veii, refused. Eventually, the starving soldiers called for surrender or an agreement on a ransom on the best terms that they could. Quintus Sulpicius and Brennus, the leader of the Senones, held talks. They agreed on a ransom of a thousand pounds of gold. The Senones cheated, using heavier weights to weigh the gold. When the Romans protested, "Brennus tossed his sword on the scale, uttering words intolerable to the Roman ears, namely 'Vae victis' or 'Woe to the vanquished!'"

Paying off the Senones to leave the city was a humiliation for the Romans. However, as Livy put it, "god and man forbade the Romans to be a ransomed people". Before the weighing of the gold had been completed, Camillus reached Rome and ordered the gold not to be taken away. The Gauls said that an agreement had been made, but Camillus said that since it had been struck by an official of lesser status than he was, it was invalid. Camillus then offered battle, and the Senones were easily defeated. They were defeated again 13 km (8 mi) east of Rome. Livy wrote the "slaughter was total: their camp was captured and not even the messenger survived to report the disaster".

=== Account of Diodorus Siculus ===
In the account of Diodorus Siculus, which is much less detailed, the Senones spent the first day after the battle by the Allia cutting off the heads of the dead, which he claimed was their custom, and then encamped by the city for two days. Meanwhile, the despairing inhabitants of Rome thought that the whole army had been wiped out and that there was no chance of resistance. Many of them fled to other towns. The leaders of the city ordered food, gold, silver and other possessions to be taken to Capitoline Hill, which was then fortified. The Senones thought that the noise in the city meant that a trap was being prepared. However, on the fourth day, they broke down the city gates and pillaged the city. They made daily attacks on the Capitoline but did not hurt any civilians. They suffered many casualties. Finding that they could not take it by force, they decided to lay siege.

Meanwhile, the Etruscans raided the Roman territory around Veii, capturing prisoners and booty. The Roman soldiers who had fled to Veii ambushed them, put them to flight, seized their camp, regained the booty, and took a large number of weapons. The Romans reconstituted an army, gathered men who had dispersed in the countryside when they fled Rome and then decided to relieve the siege of the Capitoline Hill. Cominius Pontius was sent as a messenger to the Capitoline Hill to tell the besieged about the plan and that the men at Veii were waiting for an opportunity to attack. There is no mention of Camillus in the account of Diodorus Siculus.

Pontius swam across the River Tiber and went up a cliff, which was difficult to climb. After giving his message, he returned to Veii. The Gauls noticed the track left by Pontius and ascended the same cliff. The Roman guards were neglectful of their watch and the Gauls escaped detection. When the geese made a noise, the guards rushed against the attackers. Diodorus called Manlius Capitolinus Marcus Mallius and wrote that he cut off the hand of the first Senone climber with his sword and pushed him down the hill. Since the hill was steep, all enemy soldiers fell and died. Then, the Romans negotiated peace and persuaded the Gauls "upon receipt of one thousand pounds of gold, to leave the city and to withdraw from Roman territory".

=== Account of Plutarch ===
Plutarch painted a greater picture of destruction and killings than Livy. The Gauls went to Rome on the third day after the battle, where the gates were open, and the walls were unguarded. They marched through the Colline gate. Brennus had the Capitoline Hill surrounded and went to the Forum. He was surprised to see the men sitting outdoors and remaining quiet without fear when they were approached, "leaning on their staves and gazing into one another's faces". The Gauls hesitated to get close to them and touch them and regarded them as superior beings. However, a Gaul plucked up his courage and stroked the long beard of Papirius Marcus, who hit him hard on the head with his staff. The Gauls then killed all men and sacked and burned the houses for many days. The defenders of Capitoline Hill did not surrender and repulsed an attack. The Gauls killed everyone they captured, including women, children and the elderly. The Gauls entered Rome shortly after the Ides of July and withdrew from the city about the Ides of February (February 13), the siege lasting seven months.

Plutarch also notes that some Gauls reached Ardea and that Camillus rallied the city against them and attacked them. On hearing the news, the neighbouring cities called to arms the men of military age, especially the Romans who had fled to Veii. They wanted Camillus to be their commander but refused to do so before he was legally elected. Plutarch then relayed the story of Pontius Cominius and his mission to Capitoline Hill. Camillus could not cross the bridge over the Tiber because the Gauls were guarding it and so he swam across supported by pieces of cork and went to the Carmental Gate. When he reached the top of the Capitoline, the Senate appointed Camillus as dictator. Camillus gathered soldiers from the allies and went to Veii, where there were 20,000 soldiers.

After the episode of the geese of Juno, the Gauls were less hopeful. They were short of provisions but did not go foraging because they feared Camillus. They were also affected by the disease because they were encamped amid ruins, and there were dead bodies scattered everywhere. The wind scattered ash, which made breathing difficult. They were also suffering from the Mediterranean heat to which they were not accustomed. The Gauls "were now whiling away the seventh month in its siege. For all these reasons the mortality was great in their camp; so many were the dead that they could no longer be buried".

The defenders of the Capitoline, in turn, could not get news from Camillus because the city was closely guarded by the enemy. Famine worsened, and the city became dejected and agreed to pay a ransom.

When Camillus arrived in Rome, he lifted the gold from the scales and said that it was the Roman custom to deliver the city with iron, not gold. He then said that the agreement to pay a ransom had not been made legally since it was made without him, who had been made the legal ruler, and so it was not binding. The Gauls now had to say what they wanted because "he [had] come with legal authority to grant pardon to those who asked it, and to inflict punishment on the guilty, unless they showed repentance". Brennus began a skirmish. The two sides could not fight a battle because no battle array was possible "in the heart of the ruined city". Brennus led his men to their camp and then left the city during the night. At dawn, Camillus caught up with them and routed them "[of] the fugitives, some were at once pursued and cut down, but most of them scattered abroad, only to be fallen upon and slain by the people of the surrounding villages and cities".

News of the Gallic sack reached Greece. Plutarch mentions an inaccurate story by Heracleides Ponticus and that Aristotle wrote about the capture of Rome by the Gauls and said that the saviour of the city was "a certain Lucius", not Camillus.

=== Assessment of Augustine ===
Augustine discusses the causes in De Civitate Dei, part I, book III.

=== Roman recovery ===
Livy said that the city was burnt and that it then developed a haphazard layout because it was rebuilt hastily. However, Cornell notes that Diodorus Siculus and Polybius made only scarce references to the period. He also disputes the extent of the damage suffered by Rome. He points out that there is no archaeological trace of the damage to the sack. Signs of burning that were thought to be dated to this event have subsequently been dated to the rebellion that had brought down the Roman monarchy more than a century earlier. Cornell thinks that the Senones ransacked the city but were interested only in the booty, left most of the buildings alone, and went after they had been bought off. It was common for the layout of ancient cities to be haphazard. He adds that Rome's recovery was aided by cementing the newly-conquered territory of Veii by granting its inhabitants citizenship without the right to vote and by a strengthening of the alliance with Caere, which had helped Rome during the Gallic sack. After the initial setback and attacks, Rome resumed its expansionism of the late 5th and early 4th centuries.

A few years after the sack, Rome began to build new city walls using ashlar masonry from a quarry in the territory of Veii. It was a huge undertaking as the wall was 11 km (7 mi) long. The original wall had been built in Cappellaccio tuff, the local stone, which was of rather poor quality because it is a quite friable stone. The wall was rebuilt with a type of yellow tuff, named Grotta Oscura (after its main quarry), which was of much better quality, in the territory of Veii. Thus, the acquisition of Veii provided Rome with better masonry for construction. However, the new rock was harder and thus more difficult to work.

The Gallic sack led to a long-lasting and profound fear of the Gauls in Rome. In 350 and 349 BC, unspecified Gauls attacked Latium. They were probably marauding raids. On the second occasion, Marcus Valerius Corvus was said to have fought a duel with a Gallic champion. Polybius said that Rome made a peace with the Gauls, who did not return for 30 years. Despite Rome defeating the Senones in the Battle of Sentinum (295) during the Third Samnite War (298-290), popular fear of Gauls persisted. In 228, 216, and 114 fears of Gallic attacks led to the Romans performing human sacrifices by burying alive a pair of Gauls and a pair of Greeks even though human sacrifice was not a Roman custom. Presumably, it was done to avert the danger of another Gallic disaster.

== Modern assessments ==
The accounts of the battle of the Allia and the sack of Rome were written centuries after the events, and their reliability is questionable. That may also account for the discrepancies between Livy and Diodorus Siculus concerning the sack of the city.

The rescue of the city by Camillus is seen by many modern historians as an addition to the story since he was not mentioned by Diodorus Siculus and Polybius, another ancient Greek historian. Diodorus said that the Gauls were defeated at the Trausian Plain, an unidentified location, by an Etruscan army when they were on the way back from southern Italy. Strabo wrote that they were defeated by Caere (the Etruscan city, allied to Rome, to which the Vestal priestesses had fled) and that the Caerites recovered Rome's ransomed gold. That runs counter to the notion that Camillus stopped the payment of a ransom to the Senones. As has been noted, Plutarch wrote that Aristotle said Rome was saved by "a certain Lucius". That could be Lucius Albinus, who was said to have given the priestesses a lift to Caere. The role of Caere in the saga of the Gallic sack is unclear, and it may be that it played a more important role than in the Roman tradition.

There is also the question of what the Senones were doing in central Italy. Diodorus Siculus wrote that the Senones were "distressed and eager to move" because they had settled to a place (the Ager Gallicus) that was too hot. They armed their younger men and sent them out to seek a territory where they might settle. Therefore, they invaded Etruria, the 30,000 sacked the territory of Clusium. However, Cornell finds that to be unconvincing. Throughout the story, the Senones appear to be a warrior band. There is no mention in any of the accounts of wives and children, who would have been present if the Gauls had been a migrating people in search of land. Cornell thinks that they were mercenaries. A few months after the sack of Rome, Dionysius I of Syracuse, the tyrant of the Greek city of Syracuse, in Sicily, hired Gallic mercenaries for a war in the south of Italy. It may well be that was why the Senones were on their way to the south. The story of their defeat on their way back from the south seems to fit with that hypothesis. It could also be that the Senones went to Clusium because they had been hired by one of two political factions at loggerheads to intervene in political struggles in the city, rather than the romanticised story of Aruns's revenge for his wife.

According to scholar Piero Treves, "the absence of any archaeological evidence for a destruction-level of this date suggests that [this] sack of Rome was superficial only."

== Legacy ==
The dies Alliensis ('Day of the Allia') was regarded as an exceptionally ill-omened day in the Roman calendar. Several ancient authors report that Romans regarded the anniversary of the defeat at the Allia as a dies religiosus, which in this context must be understood in its archaic sense, referring to a ritual prohibition rather than to 'religious' observance in the modern sense.

By the 1st century BC, ancient writers treated the Gallic sack as the most serious outrage in Roman history and as a civic trauma, the memory of which was maintained through narratives and religious prohibitions. Livy states that Romans abstained from all public activity and ceremonies on 18 July. Tacitus characterizes emperor Vitellius as ignorant of human and divine law for ordering public ceremonies to be held on that day.

Some modern scholars have interpreted the Gallic sack as a long-lasting collective trauma that generated deep, irrational fear of Gauls (metus Gallicus) among the Romans, although others caution that the sources provide no evidence for a sustained or irrational panic during the Roman Republic, and the dies Alliensis itself is not attested before the mid-1st century BC. Conflicting traditions and the lack of earlier records rather suggest that the memory of the Gallic sack was later reconstructed and not designated religiosus immediately after the event.

== Bibliography ==
=== Modern sources ===
- Armstrong, Jeremy (2025). Children of Mars: the origins of Rome's empire. Ancient warfare and civilization. Oxford University Press. ISBN 978-0-19-758499-6.
- Cary, Max; Scullard, H. H. (1975). A History of Rome: Down to the Reign of Constantine (3rd ed.). Palgrave Macmillan. ISBN 978-0-312-21419-7.
- Cornell, T. J. (1995). The Beginnings of Rome: Italy and Rome from the Bronze Age to the Punic Wars. The Routledge History of the Ancient World. London: Routledge. ISBN 978-0415015967.
- Ellis, Peter Berresford (1998). Celt and Roman: the Celts of Italy. New York: St. Martin's Press. ISBN 978-0312214197.
- Engerbeaud, Mathieu (2018). "Le « jour de l'Allia » (dies Alliensis) : recherches sur l'anniversaire d'une défaite dans les calendriers romains". Mélanges de l'École française de Rome. 130–1 (130–1). doi:10.4000/mefra.4769. ISSN 0223-5102.
- Grafton, A. T.; Swerdlow, N. M. (1988). "Calendar Dates and Ominous Days in Ancient Historiography". Journal of the Warburg and Courtauld Institutes. 51: 14–42. doi:10.2307/751261. ISSN 0075-4390. JSTOR 751261.
- Kruta, Venceslas (2000). Les Celtes, histoire et dictionnaire : des origines à la romanisation et au christianisme. Robert Laffont. ISBN 2-221-05690-6.
- Rosenberger, Veit (2003). "The Gallic Disaster". The Classical World. 96 (4): 365–373. doi:10.2307/4352787. ISSN 0009-8418. JSTOR 4352787.
- Treves, Piero (2015). "Brennus (1), Gallic chieftain". Oxford Research Encyclopedia of Classics. doi:10.1093/acrefore/9780199381135.013.1165. ISBN 978-0-19-938113-5.

=== Ancient sources ===
- Diodorus Siculus (1935) [c. 36–30 BC]. Library of History. Loeb Classical Library. Translated by Oldfather, C. H. Harvard University Press (published 1989). ISBN 978-0674993754 – via LacusCurtius.
- Dionysius of Halicarnassus (1950) [c. 30–10 BC]. Roman Antiquities. Loeb Classical Library. Translated by Cary, Earnest. Harvard University Press, W. Heinemann – via LacusCurtius.
- Livy (1922) [c. 27–9 BC]. Ab Urbe Condita. Loeb Classical Library. Vol. 3. Translated by Foster, Benjamin Oliver. Harvard University Press, W. Heinemann – via Perseus Project.
- Plutarch (1914) [c. 100 AD]. "Camillus". Plutarch's Lives. Loeb Classical Library. Vol. 2. Translated by Perrin, Bernadotte. Harvard University Press, W. Heinemann. ISBN 978-1236726704 – via LacusCurtius.
- Polybius (1922) [c. 170–140 BC]. Histories. Loeb Classical Library. Translated by Paton, W. R. Harvard University Press, W. Heinemann – via LacusCurtius.
- Strabo (1917) [c. 7 BC–18 AD]. Geography. Loeb Classical Library. Translated by Jones, H. L. Harvard University Press, W. Heinemann – via LacusCurtiu.
- Tacitus (1925) [c. 100–110 AD]. Histories. Loeb Classical Library. Translated by Moore, C. H. Harvard University Press, W. Heinemann – via LacusCurtius.
