= Crustumerium =

Ancient town of Latium

Coordinates: 42°03′N 12°37′E

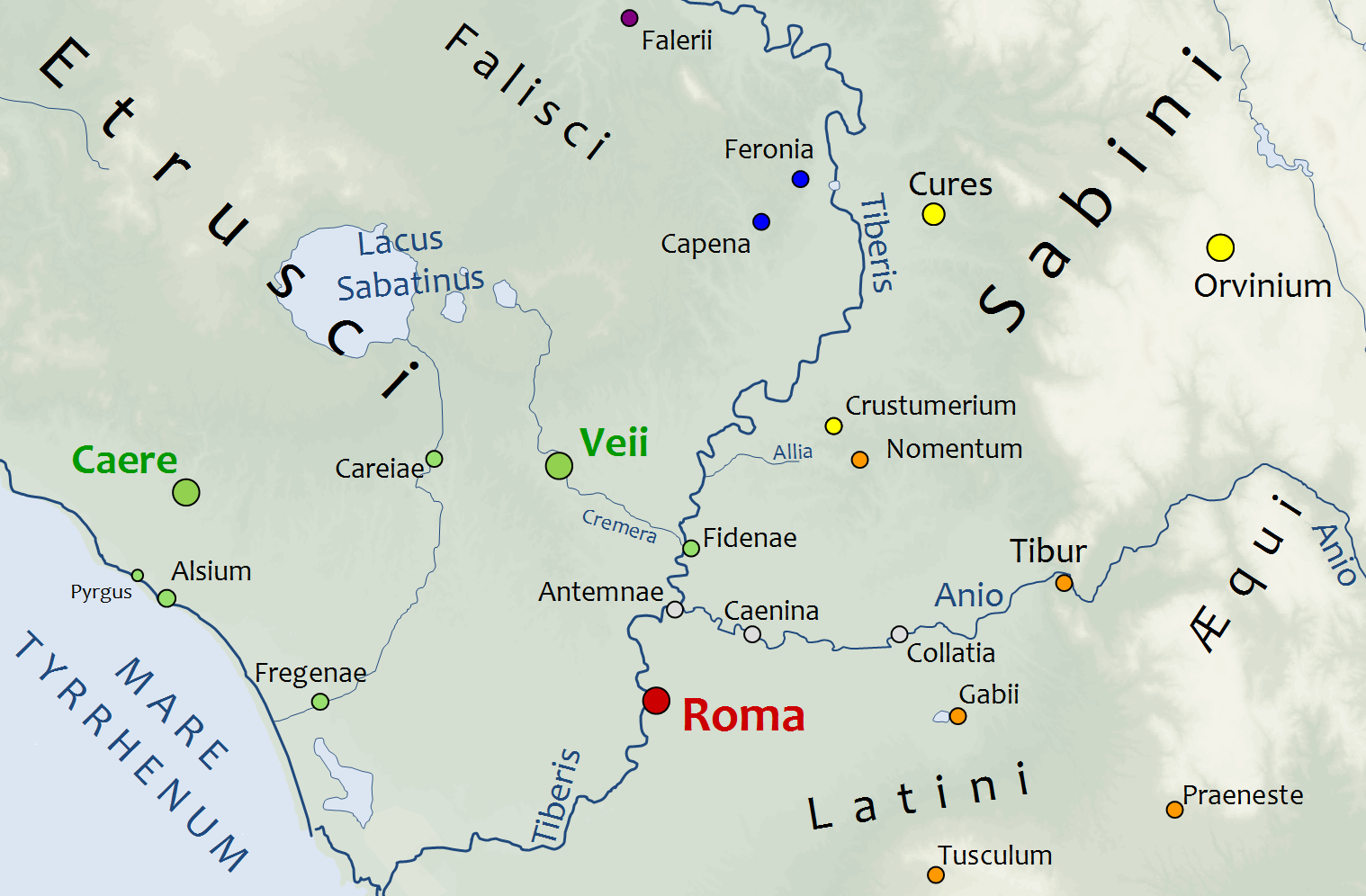
Map of Rome under the monarchy

Crustumerium (or Crustumium) was an ancient town of Latium, on the edge of the Sabine territory, near the headwaters of the Allia, not far from the Tiber.

Crustumerium is unique among Latial settlements for its prolific usage of chamber tombs during the 6th-century BCE; whereas other contemporary Latial communities typically contain few examples of such burials, Crustumerium contains tens of chamber tombs. It is unclear precisely why Crustumerium adopted these distinct cultural customs, although it may relate to influence from the neighboring Faliscan-Capenate or Sabine cultures, who are known to have utilized chamber tombs during the 6th-century BCE.

In the legends concerning Rome's early history, the Crustumini were amongst the peoples which attended Romulus' festival of Neptune Equester. At that festival, the Roman men seized the young women amongst the visiting spectators, an event known as the Rape of the Sabine Women. Afterwards, according to Livy, the Crustumini commenced hostilities. The Romans retaliated and captured Crustumerium. A Roman colony was subsequently sent to the town by Romulus and many citizens of the town migrated to Rome. More of the Roman colonists preferred to go to Crustumerium than to another town, Antemnae, because of the fertility of the soil at the former.

There are at least two, possibly three, types of chamber tomb discernable in the archaeological record at Cisterna Grande within Crustumerium. One type consists of a small semicircular room with loculi on opposing walls that was entered via a short, narrow dromos and constructed from uneven stone surfaces with visible incisions. The other type consisted of a larger chamber that was entered via a large and deep dromos and could contain numerous loculi and additional coffin or trunk burials. It was common among both burial types for the entrance of the tomb to be obstructed in some manner, although the method varied across each burial—some chambers were only blocked by a single large slab whereas others utilized a heap of stones. Rajala suggests that tombs were walled off as part of an effort to maintain the separation of the living and the dead.

According to Livy, the town later revolted to become part of the Latin League, which went to war with Rome during the reign of Rome's king Lucius Tarquinius Priscus. Crustumerium was one of a number of towns captured by Tarquinius.

It was conquered in 500 BC according to Livy (ii. 19), the tribus Crustumina or Clustumina being formed in 471 BC.

Livy records that in 468 BC the Sabines marched through the territory of Crustumerium towards Latium, ravaging the countryside.

Pliny mentions it among the lost cities of Latium, but the name clung to the district, the fertility of which remained famous. The site of Crustumerium has been identified in the locality Marcigliana Vecchia, north to modern Rome along the Via Salaria, not far from Settebagni; only partially excavated, it covered an area of some 60 hectares.

Since the site of the city was identified in the 1970s, an archaeological project has been undertaken. In 2010 the Groningen Institute of Archaeology (GIA) received funding of the Netherlands Organization for Scientific Research (NWO) to elaborate their research on the Iron Age settlement of Crustumerium.
