= Allia =

Location
- Country: Italy

Physical characteristics
- Mouth: Tiber
  - coordinates: 42°01′03″N 12°31′12″E

Basin features
- Progression: Tiber→ Tyrrhenian Sea

Allia is a small river in Lazio, Italy. It is a left tributary of the Tiber with confluence about 18 kilometres (11 mi) from Rome. The Allia's source is located in the mountains near the location of Crustumerium and it flows near Monterotondo towards the Tiber.

The confluence of Allia and the Tiber is the site of the Battle of the Allia, where Romans were defeated by the Gallic tribe Senones under Brennus in 387 BC.
