= Vae victis =

Latin phrase

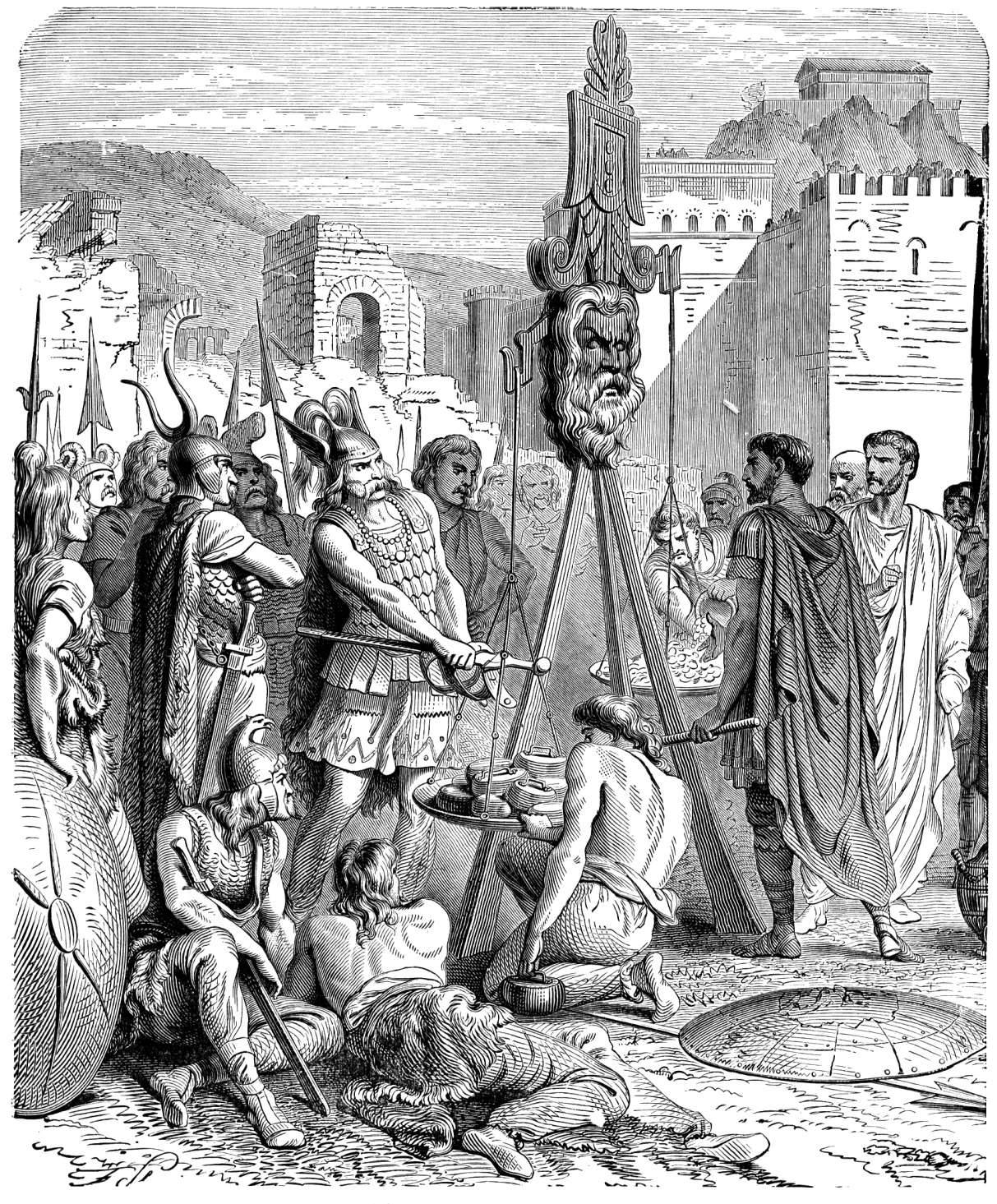
"Vae victis!" Brennus throws his sword onto the scales. Illustration by Paul Lehugeur, 1886.

Vae victis (IPA: [ˈwae̯ ˈwɪktiːs]) is Latin for "woe to the vanquished", or "woe to the conquered". (Note: Victis is the dative plural form of victus; the dative singular forms of the phrase are vae victo (masculine & neuter) & vae victae (feminine).) It means that those defeated in battle are entirely at the mercy of their conquerors.

According to tradition, in 390 BC, an army of Gauls led by Brennus attacked Rome and captured all of the city except for the Capitoline Hill. Brennus besieged the hill, and finally the Romans asked to ransom their city. Brennus demanded 1,000 Roman pounds (approximately 725 modern avoirdupois pounds (330 kg)) of gold, and the Romans agreed to his terms. According to Plutarch's Life of Camillus and Livy's Ab Urbe Condita (Book 5 Sections 34–49), the Gauls provided steelyard balances and weights, which were used to measure the amount of gold. The Romans brought the gold, but claimed that the provided weights were rigged in the Gauls' favor. The Romans complained to Brennus, who took his sword, threw it onto the weights, and exclaimed, "Vae victis!" The Romans thus needed to bring even more gold, as they now had to counterbalance the sword as well. Livy and Plutarch claim that Camillus subsequently succeeded in defeating the Gauls before the ransom had to be paid, although Polybius, Diodorus Siculus, and a later passage from Livy contradict this.

== See also ==
- Battle of the Allia
- Calgacus, the Caledonian chief who is frequently quoted as saying "they make a desert and call it peace"
- List of Latin phrases
- Law of the jungle
- Melian Dialogue
- Might makes right
- Right of conquest
- Trial by combat
- Victor's justice
