= Victor's justice =

Biased application of justice by the victors of an armed conflict

"Victor's justice" is a pejorative term which is used in reference to a distorted application of justice to the defeated party by the victorious party after an armed conflict. Victor's justice generally involves the excessive or unjustified punishment of defeated parties and the light punishment of or clemency for offenses which have been committed by victors. Victors' justice can be used in reference to manifestations of a difference in rules which can amount to hypocrisy and revenge or retributive justice leading to injustice. Victors' justice may also refer to a misrepresentation of historical recording of the events and actions of the losing party throughout or preceding the conflict.

The English term "victors' justice" was first used by history professor Richard Minear in his 1971 account of the International Military Tribunal for the Far East, and is typically (but not always) applied to the aftermath of warfare. It may be a loan translation of synonymous German Siegerjustiz, which is attested since at least the 1960s. The closely related term Vae victis behaviour is where a victor unilaterally changes the agreed treaties or their interpretations and is seen as a form of victor's justice.

== History of the laws of war ==
Legal constraints on the conduct of war in Ancient Rome appear in Cicero: "As for war, humane laws touching it are drawn up in the fetial code of the Roman People." Specifically, "no war is just, unless it is entered upon after an official demand for satisfaction has been submitted or warning has been given and a formal declaration made." Breaches of this duty by Roman citizens were adjudicated at trial. But to enemies of war, Roman law attributed neither duties nor rights; hence judgment – and punishment – of defeated foes was at Roman discretion. Still, the exercise of that discretion must serve justice, Cicero argued: "...when the victory is won, we should spare those who have not been blood-thirsty and barbarous in their warfare" (warmaking being excused only when "we may live in peace unharmed" in no other way).

The Western tradition of thinking on just war continues into Christendom and then modernity, and from the late 19th century becomes codified in international conventions, most notably those of Geneva and the Hague, then said to express laws of war.

== Allegations ==
Victor's justice is alleged to have occurred throughout history.

A well-known ancient example is the Siege of Plataea in 429–427 BC, during the Peloponnesian War. The town of Plataea, a staunch ally of Athens, steadfastly endured a prolonged siege by the Spartans and their allies, finally surrendering to the Spartans when all supplies they had were exhausted and no hope of relief remained. They had trusted the Spartans to a fair trial, as the Spartans had promised to "judge them all fairly", and that "only the guilty should be punished" if they yielded. Yet, when the Plataean prisoners were brought before the judges, no trial was held and they could offer no real defense. The Spartans simply asked each of the prisoners if they had done the Spartans and allies any service in the war, to which the prisoners ultimately had no choice but to answer "no". It was well known to anybody involved that during the entire war the Plataeans had fought on the Athenian side, against the Spartans, that being the duly declared policy of their city-state. Upon the Plataeans giving that negative answer, they were put to death one by one – over 200 of them. Thucydides clearly considered this an unfair judicial procedure.

Documented allegations of victor's justice became especially prevalent since the 19th century.

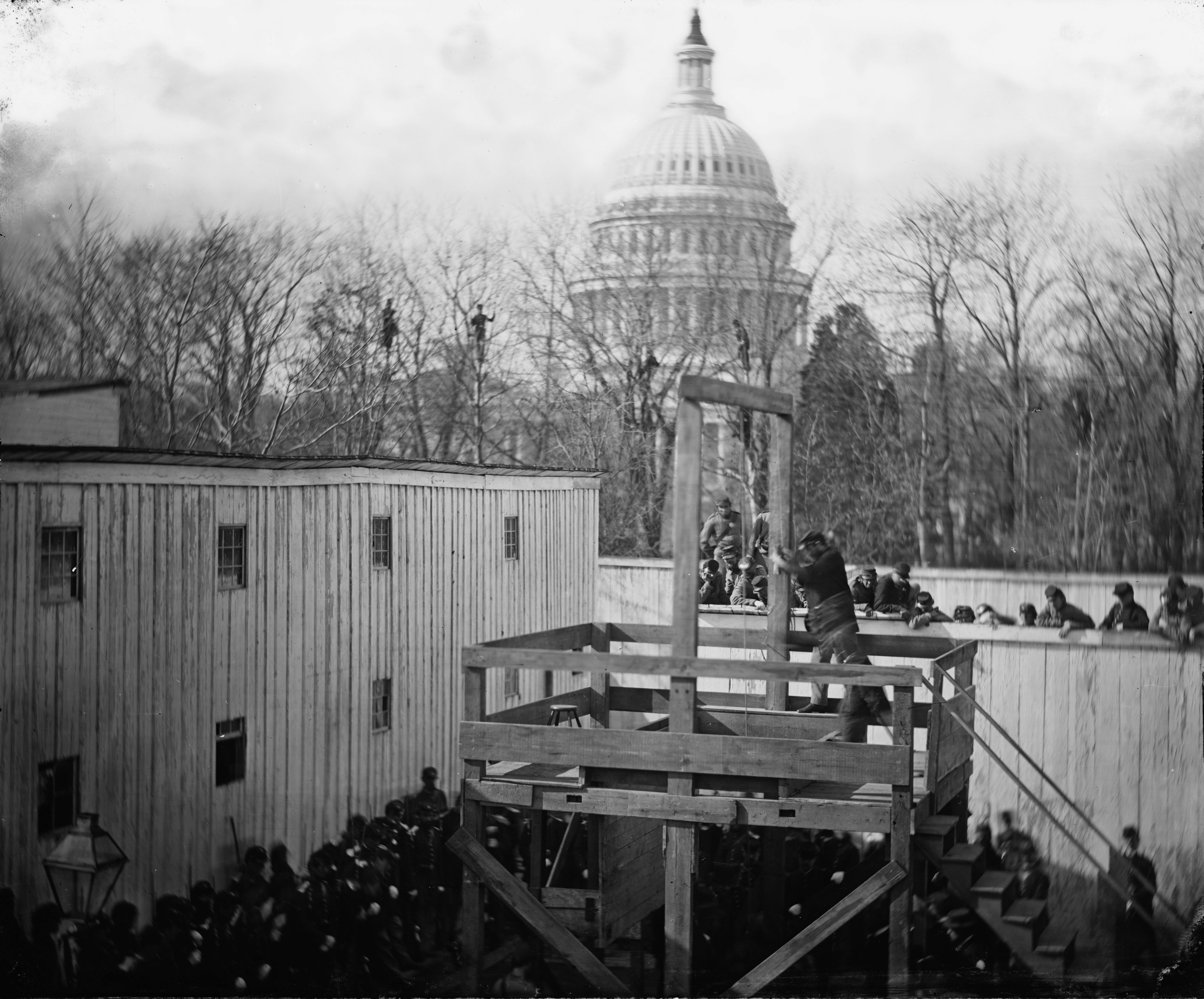
The execution of Henry Wirz in 1865 after the American Civil War.

James Madison Page, a veteran of the Union army during the American Civil War, presented a stark and detailed example of victor's justice in his 1908 book The True Story of Andersonville Prison, subtitled "A Defense of Major Henry Wirz". After describing his months as a prisoner of war of the Confederacy, Page recounts the imprisonment and trial of Captain Henry Wirz, the only commandant of Camp Sumter prisoner of war camp near Andersonville, Georgia. The Confederacy held approximately 45,000 Union prisoners at Camp Sumter from February 1864 to April 1865, during which nearly 13,000 died due to the prison's horrific conditions. Wirz became known as "The Demon of Andersonville" in the victorious Union, and was one of only two Confederates convicted of war crimes for their actions during the American Civil War. Wirz was found guilty by a war crimes tribunal and publicly executed in Washington, D.C., on November 10, 1865. Some have questioned the charges against Wirz, his personal responsibility for the conditions at Camp Sumter, and the fairness of his post-war trial. In 1980, historian Morgan D. Peoples referred to Wirz as a "scapegoat" and his conviction remains controversial.

The war crimes trials following World War II were later observed to feature many of the phenomena and issues seen in Page's account of Wirz's trial, conviction, sentencing, and execution. The Nuremberg Criminal Court for war crimes (and subsidiary courts like the Dachau International Military Tribunal) prosecuted only Axis nationals or collaborators for war crimes and did not prosecute Allied war crimes.

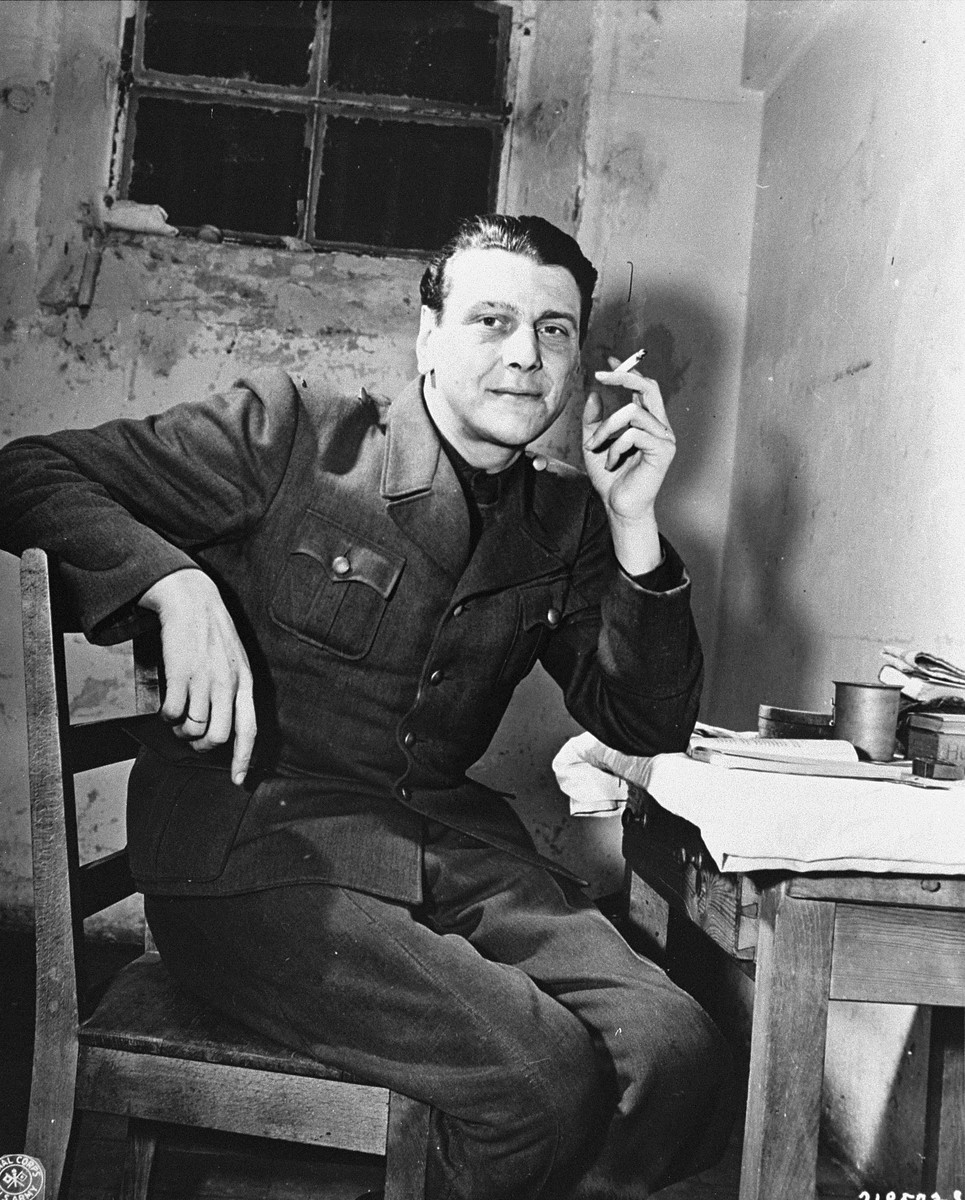
Waffen-SS lieutenant-colonel Otto Skorzeny's defence at the Dachau trials argued his alleged violations of the laws of war during the Battle of the Bulge were permitted by the military code of his opponent, the United States Army.

By the mid-twentieth century, the armed forces of developed nations commonly issued their soldiers detailed written guidance on the customs and international treaty obligations that comprise the laws of war. For example, at the trial of SS-Obersturmbannführer Otto Skorzeny, his defense was based in part on the Field Manual published by the War Department of the United States Army in 1940, as well as on the American Soldiers' Handbook. Prosecution for war crimes therefore normally falls under the jurisdiction of the courts-martial of an offender's own military. When members of the Allied armed forces broke their military codes, they could face charges, as for example the Dachau massacre or the Biscari massacre trials. The unconditional surrender of the Axis powers was unusual and led directly to the formation of the international tribunals. International wars usually end conditionally, and the treatment of suspected war criminals makes up part of the peace treaty. In most cases those who are not prisoners of war are tried under their own judicial systems if they are suspected of committing war crimes, as happened at the end of WWII in Finland, when the Allied Control Commission provided a list of occurrences of war crimes and crimes against peace, and the investigation and judgment of these cases were left to Finnish courts according to Finnish law. However, an ex post facto law had to be instated for those cases, as the Finnish Criminal Act did not cover responsibility for politics resulting in a war. In restricting the international tribunal to trying suspected Axis war crimes, the Allies were acting within normal international law.

The Reunification of Germany in October 1990 saw the German Democratic Republic (East Germany) absorbed into the Federal Republic of Germany (West Germany) to form the modern unified country of Germany. Reunification saw numerous East German officials charged with crimes by German courts that were direct continuations of West German courts, which some considered to be victor's justice. Many low-ranking members of the Border Troops of the German Democratic Republic were charged with crimes related to Republikflucht, with an estimated 300 to 400 deaths at the Berlin Wall and Inner German border. These border guards, known as Todesschützen ("death shooters"), were often convicted despite arguing they were following Schießbefehl ("order to fire") from superiors which instructed guards to shoot escapees that ignored two warnings to stop. The German courts argued East German border laws were so fundamentally in conflict with the International Covenant on Civil and Political Rights, which East Germany had signed and ratified, that they were not law at all but formalized injustice, and thus the soldiers ought to have disobeyed their commanding officers.

== Attempts to ensure the fairness of war crimes prosecutions ==
Since World War II, the accusation of victor's justice has arisen in every subsequent conflict where war crimes prosecutions have been made. Examples of include the Yugoslav wars, the Rwandan genocide, the war in Afghanistan and the Iraq war.

The International Criminal Court (ICC) was set up in 2003 as a treaty arrangement between member states in an attempt to provide a neutral international court that avoids the accusation of "victor's justice", and that would prosecute all alleged war crimes, on either side of any conflict..

== Current allegations ==
- The International Criminal Tribunal for the former Yugoslavia (ICTY), organized by the United Nations claims jurisdiction over all acts of genocide, crimes against humanity and war crimes within the territory of former Yugoslavia. But so far the Tribunal has prosecuted only citizens from the Balkan states. Most defendants have been Serb politicians, soldiers and paramilitaries but Croats, Bosnians and ethnic Albanian Kosovo Liberation Army guerrillas have also been tried. However, the Tribunal has declined to investigate allegations made by Western academics and Serb politicians, who accused NATO officials of war crimes during the 1999 bombing of Serbia (the Kosovo War), including the deliberate bombing of a Serb TV station killing journalists, and the lethal bombing (possibly reckless) of a railway bridge whilst a civilian train was passing over it.
- The International Criminal Tribunal for Rwanda (ICTR), organized by the United Nations claims jurisdiction over all acts of genocide, crimes against humanity and war crimes within the territory of Rwanda. However, while the Tribunal has successfully prosecuted members of the former Hutu government for their crimes, it has largely failed to prosecute war crimes committed by the Tutsi-led Rwandan Patriotic Front, leading it to be accused of victor's justice.

== See also ==
- Combatant Status Review Tribunal
- Disarmed Enemy Forces
- Might makes right
- Philosophy of History, on the assertion that history is written by the victors
- Tomoyuki Yamashita
- Treaty of Versailles
- Vae victis
