= Might makes right =

View that morality is, or ought to be, determined by those in power

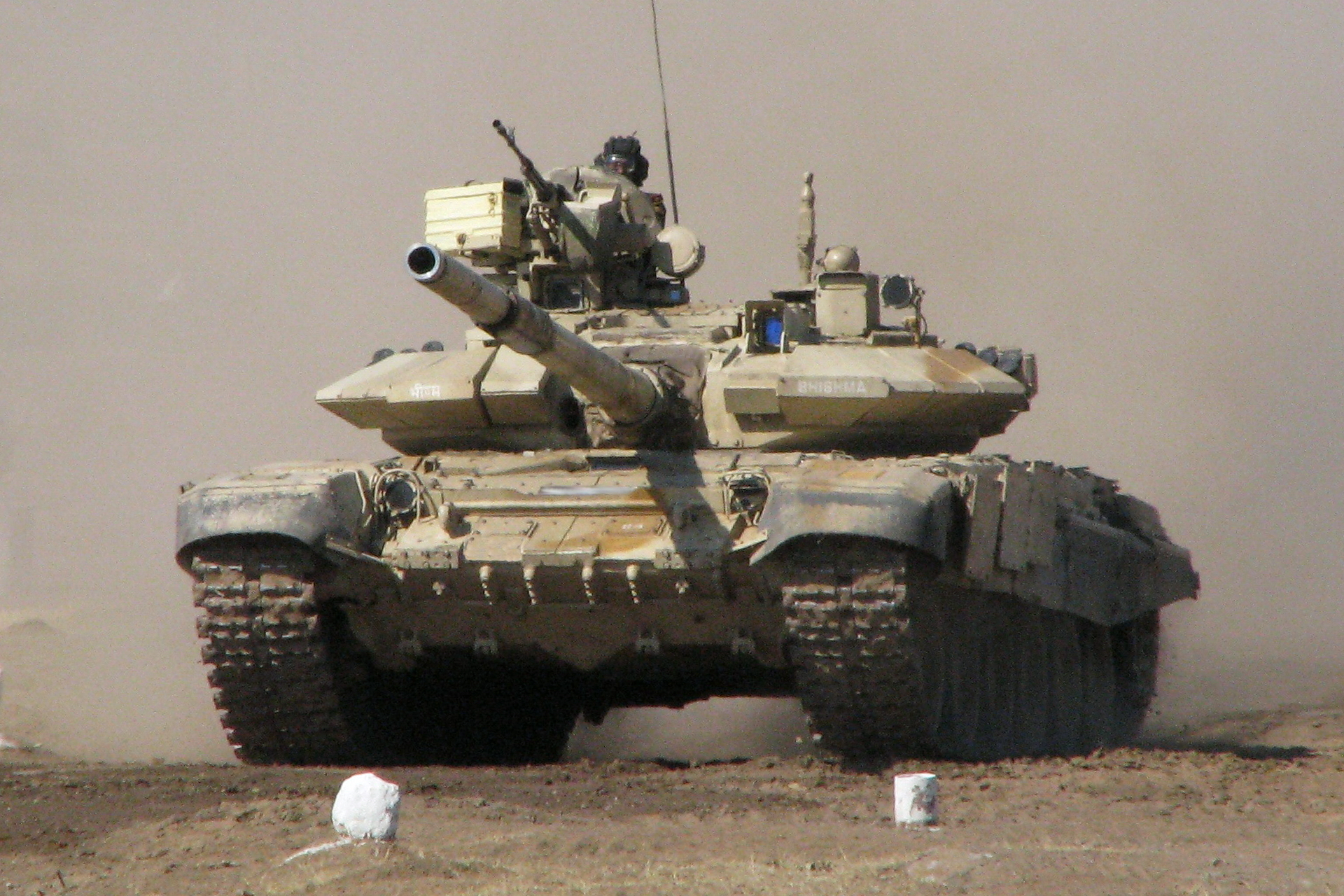
T-90 tank of the Indian army.

"Might makes right" or "might is right" is an aphorism that asserts that having superior strength or power gives one the ability to control society and enforce one's own agenda, beliefs, concepts of justice, and so on. Montague defined kratocracy or kraterocracy (from the Ancient Greek: κράτος, romanized: krátos, lit. 'might; strength') as a government by those strong enough to seize control through violence or deceit.

"Might makes right" has been described as the credo of totalitarian regimes. The sociologist Max Weber analyzed the relations between a state's power and its moral authority in Wirtschaft und Gesellschaft. Realist scholars of international politics use the phrase to describe the "state of nature" in which power determines the relations among sovereign states.

== History ==
The idea, though not the wording, has been attributed to the History of the Peloponnesian War, written around 410 BC by the ancient historian Thucydides, who stated that "right, as the world goes, is only in question between equals in power, while the strong do what they can and the weak suffer what they must."

In the first chapter of Plato's Republic, authored around 375 BC Thrasymachus claims that "justice is nothing else than the interest of the stronger", which Socrates then disputes. Callicles in Gorgias argues similarly that the strong should rule the weak, as a right owed to their superiority.

The Book of Wisdom, written around the first century BC to first century AD, describes the reasoning of the wicked: "Let us oppress the righteous poor man; let us not spare the widow nor regard the gray hairs of the aged. But let our might be our law of right, for what is weak proves itself to be useless."

The related idea of "woe to the conquered" is stated in Livy's History of Rome, in which the similar Latin phrase "vae victis" is first recorded.

An early instance of the phrase in English is found in Tottel's Miscellany (1557): "Trouth is folly: and might is right". Josuah Sylvester's 1614 translation of Henry Smith's "The Map of Man" has the line "Might makes Right in every Cause".

Another early instance is found in Thomas Carlyle's 1839 essay Chartism: "Might and Right do differ frightfully from hour to hour; but give them centuries to try it in, they are found to be identical." He later clarified his position in a journal entry from 1848, saying that "right is the eternal symbol of might" rather than the reverse.

In 1846, the American pacifist and abolitionist Adin Ballou (1803–1890) wrote, "But now, instead of discussion and argument, brute force rises up to the rescue of discomfited error, and crushes truth and right into the dust. 'Might makes right,' and hoary folly totters on in her mad career escorted by armies and navies."

Abraham Lincoln's Cooper Union speech (1860) famously reverses the phrase by stating: "Let us have faith that right makes might, and in that faith, let us, to the end, dare to do our duty as we understand it".

Arthur Desmond authored Might Is Right in 1896, which prompted criticism from Leo Tolstoy.

Philosopher William Pepperell Montague coined the term Kratocracy, from the Greek: κρατερός (krateros), meaning "strong", for government by those who are strong enough to seize power through force or cunning.

In a letter to Albert Einstein from 1932, Sigmund Freud also explores the history and validity of "might versus right".

In 2015, Pope Francis observed that "immense inequality, injustice and acts of violence" have arisen from adoption of the principle of "might is right".

== See also ==
- Argumentum ad baculum
- Dominant culture
- Divide and conquer
- Friedrich Nietzsche
- Imperialism
- Law of the jungle
- Machiavellianism
- Master morality
- Max Stirner
- Melian Dialogue
- Noblesse oblige
- Political realism
- Political repression
- Power politics
- Right of conquest
- Social Darwinism
- Supremacism
- Survival of the fittest
- Trial by combat
- Victor's justice
- Winner and loser culture
