= Quintus Sulpicius Longus =

Quintus Sulpicius Longus came from the Roman patrician gens Sulpicii and served as one of six consular tribunes in 390 BC. According to Roman tradition, Rome was conquered by the Gauls led by Brennus during his term.

== Career ==
The full name of Quintus Sulpicius Longus is cited only in a single place in the work of Titus Livius. Otherwise, his cognomen is only attested to in a late antique list of fasti based on the Fasti Capitolini and in all other sources, only his praenomen and nomen are mentioned. According to a vague presumption of the historian Frederick Münzer, Sulpicius was possibly the son of Quintus Sulpicius Camus.

The Gauls under Brennus advanced to Rome in 390 BC. Sulpicius is said to have performed a war sacrifice, noted by the annalists Gnaeus Gellius and Lucius Cassius Hemina, according to the priestly ways. This was believed to be the reason for the defeat in the Battle of the Allia.

In Roman tradition, it is also stated that Sulpicius had been the commander of the fort during the Gallic siege and had negotiated with Brennus on the price for the withdrawal of the Gauls.

It is probable that the threefold consul Gaius Sulpicius Longus was his grandson.
