= Fabius Dorsuo =

Fabius Dorsuo was a Roman name used by men of the gens Fabia, including:

- Gaius Fabius Dorsuo (praenomen in one source as Caeso), known for exhibiting exceptional piety during the Gallic siege of Rome in 390 BC, possibly as pontifex; the account, which varies, should perhaps be regarded as legend.
- Marcus Fabius Dorsuo, consul in 345 BC, possibly also interrex in 340 and in 334 one of the commissioners for establishing a colony (triumviri coloniae deducendae) at Cales.
