= Right of conquest =

Concept in political science

The right of conquest is a claimed right of ownership to territory acquired through possession by force of arms. Once recognized as a principle of international law, the right of conquest gradually lost recognition during the 20th century, particularly in the aftermath of World War II and with the adoption of the Charter of the United Nations, which prohibits the threat or use of force against the territorial integrity or political independence of sovereign states. Since the Charter came into effect, states using military force have commonly justified their actions as self-defense or collective defense.

== History ==
Proponents state that the right of conquest acknowledges the status quo and that denial of the right is meaningless without the use of military force to oppose it. The right was traditionally accepted because the conquering force, by definition, was stronger than any lawful government that it replaced. The conqueror was more likely to secure peace and stability for the people, which thereby legitimized conquerors working towards that end.

The completion of the period of New Imperialism, the devastation of World War I and World War II, and the alignment of both the United States and the Soviet Union with the principle of self-determination led to the abandonment of the right of conquest in formal international law. The 1928 Kellogg–Briand Pact, the post-1945 Nuremberg and Tokyo Trials, the UN Charter, and the UN's role in decolonization contributed to the progressive dismantling of this principle. The UN Charter guarantees the "territorial integrity" of member states, but enforcement difficulties in the 21st century have led to contentious debate over the possible re-emergence of the right of conquest in international law.

== Conquest and military occupation ==
Until 1945, the disposition of territory acquired under the right of conquest had to be conducted according to the existing laws of war. This meant that there had to be military occupation followed by a peace settlement, and there was no reasonable chance of the defeated sovereign regaining the land. While a formal peace treaty "makes good any defects in title", it was not required. Recognition by the losing party was not a requirement: "the right of acquisition vested by conquest did not depend on the consent of the dispossessed state". Essentially, conquest itself became a legal act extinguishing the legal rights of other states without their consent. Conquest and subsequent occupation outside of war were illegal.

In the post–World War II era, not all wars involving territorial acquisitions ended in a peace treaty. For example, the fighting in the Korean War paused with an armistice, without any peace treaty covering it. As of 2026, North Korea is still technically at war with South Korea and the United States.

== See also ==
- Colonialism
- Conquest
- Debellatio
- Discovery doctrine
- Fait accompli
- Franz Oppenheimer's "conquest theory" of the state
- Imperialism
- Invasion
- Jungle justice
- Just war theory
- Mandate of Heaven
- Manifest destiny
- Might makes right
- Prize (law)
- Prize of war
- Realism (international relations)
- Revanchism
- Responsibility to protect
- Roerich Pact
- Status quo ante bellum
- Survival of the fittest
- Uti possidetis
- Vae victis
- War of aggression
- War trophy
